= Secret History (book series) =

Book series by Simon R. Green

Secret Histories is a fantasy/science fiction series by Simon R. Green. This book series was supposed to be a trilogy, but due to the great popularity of the books Green decided to continue with the series.

== Novels ==
1. The Man with the Golden Torc (UK: 17 May 2007, US: 5 June 2007)
2. Daemons Are Forever (US 3 June 2008)
3. The Spy Who Haunted Me (2 June 2009 US: 12 April 2009 UK)
4. From Hell with Love (US 1 June 2010)
5. For Heaven's Eyes Only (US 7 June 2011)
6. Live and Let Drood (US 5 June 2012)
7. Casino Infernale (US & UK 4 June 2013)
8. Property of a Lady Faire (US 3 June 2014)
9. From a Drood to a Kill (US 2 June 2015)
10. Dr. DOA (US 7 July 2016)
11. Moonbreaker (US 6 June 2017)
12. Night Fall (12 June 2018)

== Plot ==
These books are the adventures of Edwin Drood, AKA Shaman Bond (his field name; it is a parody of James Bond's name) and he is a part of the Droods, an ancient family that purportedly watches over the world and protects it from various threats, including supernatural and magical ones. Needless to say, they are wholeheartedly despised by criminals. Each Drood is entrusted with a golden (and, for some time, silver) torc, which bestows a certain "living armour" upon the wearer, giving them nearly unlimited strength, speed, durability and stealth, which can be called up or dispelled at will. The torc also grants the wearer the Sight, allowing him to see through most magical and scientific disguises, translates any language, prevents the user from appearing in any kind of photography, videotaping, or tracking of any kind (including tracking by other Droods), prevents the user's soul from being taken away (by daemons or other creatures of the sort), and a whole host of other abilities.

Edwin (he is usually referred to as "Eddie") is a field agent of the Droods who operates in the London area. During his early childhood in the Hall, the Droods' base of operations, Eddie came to hate the family due to its strict discipline and the lack of freedom given to him. At some point, the Matriarch agreed with Eddie to have him leave the Hall and base his operations outside of it. He still owed allegiance to the family and did missions for them, but was able to avoid living in the Hall and thus had much more freedom in his living.

The series acts as a framing story of sorts, with references to characters and settings within the Nightside, Hawk and Fisher, and Deathstalker stories; Giles Deathstalker plays a prominent role in the second book, Nightside agent Walker plays a large part in the third, and throughout the series many Nightside characters (e.g. Merlin Satanspawn, Leo Morn, Harry Fabulous, Janissary Jane, and even Nightside protagonist John Taylor) are referenced or appear briefly.

Simon R. Green stated that Night Fall is the final novel in the series, and features the first meeting between John Taylor and Eddie Drood, culminating in a Drood invasion of the Nightside.

== James Bond allusion ==
All of the titles of this book series are parodies of James Bond book, short story titles, or films:

- The Man with the Golden Torc: The Man with the Golden Gun
- Daemons Are Forever: Diamonds Are Forever
- The Spy Who Haunted Me: The Spy Who Loved Me
- From Hell with Love: From Russia, with Love
- For Heaven's Eyes Only: For Your Eyes Only
- Live and Let Drood: Live and Let Die
- Casino Infernale: Casino Royale
- Property of a Lady Faire: The Property of a Lady
- From a Drood to a Kill: From a View to a Kill
- Dr. DOA: Dr. No
- Moonbreaker: Moonraker
- Night Fall: Skyfall
