= James Bond comic strips =

British comic strip, 1958–1983

James Bond was a comic strip that was based on the eponymous, fictional character created by author Ian Fleming. Starting in 1958 and continuing to 1983, it consisted of 52 story arcs that were syndicated in British newspapers, seven of which were initially published abroad.

== Publication history ==
=== Daily Express strips ===
James Bond
- Author(s): Anthony Hern (1958); Henry Gammidge (1958–1966); Peter O'Donnell (1960); Jim Lawrence (1966–1984)
- Illustrator(s): John McLusky (1958–1966, 1981–1983); Yaroslav Horak (1966–1979, 1983–1984); Harry North (1981)
- Current status/schedule: Concluded daily and Sunday strip; reruns
- Launch date: 7 July 1958
- End date: 1984
- Syndicate(s): Daily Express (reruns) Andrews McMeel Syndication
- Publisher: Titan Books
- Genre: Adventure

In 1957, the Daily Express, a newspaper owned by Lord Beaverbrook, approached Ian Fleming about adapting his James Bond stories as comic strips. Fleming was then reluctant, because he felt the comic strips would lack the quality of his writing, potentially hurting his spy novel series while he was still writing. Fleming wrote:

The Express are desperately anxious to turn James Bond into a strip cartoon. I have grave doubts about the desirability of this ... Unless the standard of these books is maintained they will lose their point, and, I think, there I am in grave danger that inflation will spoil not only the readership, but also become something of a death-watch beetle inside the author. A tendency to write still further down might result. The author would see this happening, and disgust with the operation might creep in.

==== Art by John McLusky ====
Ian Fleming's commissioned impression of James Bond

John McLusky's rendition of James Bond

Regardless, Fleming later agreed, and to aid the Daily Express in illustrating James Bond, Fleming commissioned an artist to sketch whom he believed James Bond to look like. The assigned illustrator, John McLusky, however, felt that Fleming's 007 appeared too "outdated" and "pre-war", and thus changed James Bond to a more rugged and masculine appearance.

The first strip, Casino Royale, was published in 1958. The story was adapted by Anthony Hern, who previously had serialised Diamonds Are Forever and From Russia with Love for the Daily Express. The majority of the early comic strips were adapted by Henry Gammidge (other than the Dr. No adaptation, 1960, by Peter O'Donnell, years before he launched his strip Modesty Blaise). McLusky later would illustrate twelve more James Bond comic strips with partner Gammidge until 1966.

The opening panel to Casino Royale. Illustration by John McLusky.

In 1962 the Daily Express abruptly cancelled their agreement with Ian Fleming when Lord Beaverbrook and Fleming disputed the rights to the James Bond short story "The Living Daylights". Fleming had sold the rights to the Sunday Times, a rival newspaper—upsetting Beaverbrook into terminating his business relationship with Fleming. The dispute abruptly ended the comic strip adaptation of Thunderball. Additional panels were added later for its syndication to other newspapers, and to expand and conclude the story. Beaverbrook and Fleming later settled their differences, and the comic strip serial would continue in 1964 with On Her Majesty's Secret Service.

Art by John McLusky
Title	Writer	Date	Serial no.
Casino Royale	Anthony Hern	7 July 1958 – 13 December 1958	1–138
Live and Let Die	Henry Gammidge	15 December 1958 – 28 March 1959	139–225
Moonraker	Henry Gammidge	30 March 1959 – 8 August 1959	226–339
Diamonds Are Forever	Henry Gammidge	10 August 1959 – 30 January 1960	340–487
From Russia, with Love	Henry Gammidge	1 February 1960 – 21 May 1960	488–583
Dr. No	Peter O'Donnell	23 May 1960 – 1 October 1960	584–697
Goldfinger	Henry Gammidge	3 October 1960 – 1 April 1961	698–849
Risico	Henry Gammidge	3 April 1961 – 24 June 1961	850–921
From a View to a Kill	Henry Gammidge	26 June 1961 – 9 September 1961	922–987
For Your Eyes Only	Henry Gammidge	11 September 1961 – 9 December 1961	988–1065
Thunderball	Henry Gammidge	11 December 1961 – 10 February 1962	1066–1128
On Her Majesty's Secret Service	Henry Gammidge	29 June 1964 – 15 May 1965	1–274
You Only Live Twice	Henry Gammidge	17 May 1965 – 8 January 1966	275–475

==== Art by Yaroslav Horak ====
Yaroslav Horak's rendition of James Bond

In 1966 Yaroslav Horak replaced John McLusky as the artist for the Daily Express comic strip series and adapted six more Ian Fleming James Bond novels and short stories as well as Kingsley Amis' Colonel Sun with partner Jim Lawrence. The Living Daylights was also republished in the Daily Express after first appearing in the first edition of the Sunday Times magazine on 4 February 1962 and in the American magazine Argosy in June of the same year under the title Berlin Escape.

With the success of The Man with the Golden Gun Horak and Lawrence subsequently went on to write and illustrate twenty original James Bond comic strips for the Daily Express after being granted permission by Ian Fleming's Trust.

Art by Yaroslav Horak
Title	Writer	Date	Serial no.
The Man with the Golden Gun	Jim Lawrence	10 January 1966 – 9 September 1966	1–209
The Living Daylights	Jim Lawrence	12 September 1966 – 12 November 1966	210–263
Octopussy	Jim Lawrence	14 November 1966 – 27 May 1967	264–428
The Hildebrand Rarity	Jim Lawrence	29 May 1967 – 16 December 1967	429–602
The Spy Who Loved Me	Jim Lawrence	18 December 1967 – 3 October 1968	603–815
The Harpies	Jim Lawrence	10 October 1968 – 23 June 1969	816–1037
River of Death	Jim Lawrence	24 June 1969 – 29 November 1969	1038–1174
Colonel Sun	Jim Lawrence	1 December 1969 – 28 August 1970	1175–1393
The Golden Ghost	Jim Lawrence	21 August 1970 – 16 January 1971	1394–1519
Fear Face	Jim Lawrence	18 January 1971 – 20 April 1971	1520–1596
Double Jeopardy	Jim Lawrence	21 April 1971 – 28 August 1971	1597–1708
Starfire	Jim Lawrence	30 August 1971 – 24 December 1971	1709–1809
Trouble Spot	Jim Lawrence	28 December 1971 – 10 June 1972	1810–1951
Isle of Condors	Jim Lawrence	12 June 1972 – 21 October 1972	1952–2065
The League of Vampires	Jim Lawrence	25 October 1972 – 28 February 1973	2066–2172
Die with My Boots On	Jim Lawrence	1 March 1973 – 18 June 1973	2173–2256
The Girl Machine	Jim Lawrence	19 June 1973 – 3 December 1973	2257–2407
Beware of Butterflies	Jim Lawrence	4 December 1973 – 11 May 1974	2408–2541
The Nevsky Nude	Jim Lawrence	13 May 1974 – 21 September 1974	2542–2655
The Phoenix Project	Jim Lawrence	23 September 1974 – 18 February 1975	2656–2780
The Black Ruby Caper	Jim Lawrence	19 February 1975 – 15 July 1975	2781–2897
Till Death Do Us Apart	Jim Lawrence	7 July 1975 – 14 October 1975	2898–2983
The Torch-Time Affair	Jim Lawrence	15 October 1975 – 15 January 1976	2984–3060
Hot-Shot	Jim Lawrence	16 January 1976 – 1 June 1976	3061–3178
Nightbird	Jim Lawrence	2 June 1976 – 4 November 1976	3179–3312
Ape of Diamonds	Jim Lawrence	5 November 1976 – 22 January 1977	3313–3437

=== Other James Bond comic strips ===
In 1977 the Daily Express discontinued their series of Bond comic strips, although Horak and Lawrence went on to write and illustrate several other James Bond adventures for syndication abroad in Europe, for the Sunday Express (the Sunday edition of the Daily Express), and the Daily Star. Additionally, John McLusky returned to team up with Jim Lawrence for five comic strips. One strip, Doomcrack, featured artwork by Harry North, who at the time worked for MAD Magazine on its film parodies.

The 1983 strip Polestar was abruptly terminated by the Daily Star midway through its run and was not completed, although the complete story did appear in non-UK newspapers and was followed by several more complete serials before the James Bond comic strip officially came to an end.

Title	Artist	Writer	Date	Serial no.
When the Wizard Awakes	Yaroslav Horak	Jim Lawrence	30 January 1977 – 22 May 1977	1–54
Sea Dragon	Yaroslav Horak	Jim Lawrence	1977	55–192
Death Wing	Yaroslav Horak	Jim Lawrence	1977–1978	193–354
The Xanadu Connection	Yaroslav Horak	Jim Lawrence	1978	355–468
Shark Bait	Yaroslav Horak	Jim Lawrence	1978–1979	469–636
Doomcrack	Harry North	Jim Lawrence	2 February 1981 – 19 August 1981	1–174
The Paradise Plot	John McLusky	Jim Lawrence	20 August 1981 – 4 June 1982	175–378
Deathmask	John McLusky	Jim Lawrence	7 June 1982 – 2 February 1983	379–552
Flittermouse	John McLusky	Jim Lawrence	9 February 1983 – 20 May 1983	553–624
Polestar	John McLusky	Jim Lawrence	23 May 1983 – 15 July 1983	625–719
The Scent of Danger	John McLusky	Jim Lawrence	1983	720–821
Snake Goddess	Yaroslav Horak	Jim Lawrence	1983–1984	822–893
Double Eagle	Yaroslav Horak	Jim Lawrence	1984	894–965

== Titan Books reprints ==
Since first publication in the Daily Express, the comic strip adaptations have been reprinted several times, first by the James Bond 007 International Fan Club in the early 1980s, then annually from 1987 to 1990, by Titan Books company in anthologies, beginning with The Living Daylights to tie-in with the release of the eponymous James Bond film.

=== First Titan Books series ===
- The Living Daylights (June 1987) — includes: The Man with the Golden Gun and The Living Daylights
- Octopussy (March 1988) — includes: Octopussy and The Hildebrand Rarity
- The Spy Who Loved Me (June 1989) — includes: The Spy Who Loved Me
- Casino Royale (July 1990) — includes Casino Royale and Live and Let Die

=== Second Titan Books series ===
Beginning in 2004, Titan reissued these anthologies in larger, revised editions, and also began reprinting stories that hadn't been featured in the earlier books. With a more frequent publishing schedule than the first series, all 52 stories had been published in seventeen books by March 2010. These volumes include new introductory chapters on the history of the strip and the Bond novels, and most of the books have also included special introductions written by Bond film actors, specifically Caroline Munro (The Spy Who Loved Me), George Lazenby (OHMSS), Shirley Eaton (Goldfinger), Eunice Gayson (Dr. No), Roger Moore (Casino Royale), Maud Adams (Octopussy), Britt Ekland (Colonel Sun), and Richard Kiel (The Golden Ghost). Titan's comic strip reprints were not initially published in the strips' original publication order; this changed as of the release of The Spy Who Loved Me volume.

- The Man with the Golden Gun (February 2004) — The Man with the Golden Gun and The Living Daylights
- Octopussy (May 2004) — Octopussy and The Hildebrand Rarity
- On Her Majesty's Secret Service (August 2004) — On Her Majesty's Secret Service and You Only Live Twice
- Goldfinger (November 2004) — Goldfinger, Risico, From a View to a Kill, For Your Eyes Only and Thunderball
- Casino Royale (February 2005) — Casino Royale, Live and Let Die and Moonraker
- Dr. No (May 2005) — Diamonds Are Forever, From Russia with Love and Dr. No
- The Spy Who Loved Me (August 2005) — The Spy Who Loved Me and The Harpies
- Colonel Sun (December 2005) — River of Death and Colonel Sun
- The Golden Ghost (April 2006) — The Golden Ghost, Fear Face, Double Jeopardy and Starfire
- Trouble Spot (September 2006) — Trouble Spot, Isle Of Condors, The League Of Vampires and Die With My Boots On
- The Phoenix Project (February 2007) — The Phoenix Project, The Black Ruby Caper, Till Death Do Us Part and The Torch-Time Affair
- Death Wing (July 2007) — Death Wing, Sea Dragon and When The Wizard Awakes
- Shark Bait (January 2008) — The Xanadu Connection, Shark Bait and Doomcrack
- The Paradise Plot (June 2008) — The Paradise Plot and Deathmask
- Polestar (November 2008) — Flittermouse, Polestar, The Scent Of Danger, Snake Goddess and Double Eagle
- The Girl Machine (July 2009) — The Girl Machine, Beware of Butterflies and The Nevsky Nude
- Nightbird (March 2010) — Nightbird, Hot-Shot and Ape of Diamonds

The Harpies, included in The Spy Who Loved Me, is the first non-Fleming-based Bond comic strip to be reprinted as well as the first original story. River of Death, in the Colonel Sun collection, is the second original story to be published (Colonel Sun itself being an adaptation of the first post-Fleming Bond novel). The Golden Ghost is the first collection comprising all-original stories.

The collection The Phoenix Project indicates that the July 2007 release was to have been Nightbird, but this was not published as scheduled. The Nightbird collection eventually saw print in March 2010 and is considered the final release in the Titan series as all Daily Express-related strips have now been reprinted.

=== Third Titan Books series ===
From September 2009 to November 2014 larger volumes called 'Omnibus' editions were released containing more stories in each volume.

- The James Bond Omnibus: Volume 001 (September 2009) — Casino Royale, Live and Let Die, Moonraker, Diamonds Are Forever, From Russia with Love, Dr. No, Goldfinger, Risico, From a View to a Kill, For Your Eyes Only and Thunderball
- The James Bond Omnibus: Volume 002 (February 2011) — On Her Majesty's Secret Service, You Only Live Twice, The Man with the Golden Gun, The Living Daylights, Octopussy, The Hildebrand Rarity and The Spy Who Loved Me
- The James Bond Omnibus: Volume 003 (March 2012) — The Harpies, River of Death, Colonel Sun, The Golden Ghost, Fear Face, Double Jeopardy and Starfire
- The James Bond Omnibus: Volume 004 (October 2012) — Trouble Spot, Isle of Condors, The League of Vampires, Die With My Boots On, The Girl Machine, Beware of Butterflies, The Nevsky Nude, The Phoenix Project and The Black Ruby Caper
- The James Bond Omnibus: Volume 005 (November 2013) — Till Death Do Us Part, The Torch-Time Affair, Hot-Shot, Nightbird, Ape of Diamonds, When The Wizard Awakes, Sea Dragon, Death Wing and The Xanadu Connection
- The James Bond Omnibus: Volume 006 (November 2014) — Shark Bait, Doomcrack, The Paradise Plot, Deathmask, Flittermouse, Polestar, The Scent Of Danger, Snake Goddess and Double Eagle

=== Fourth Titan Books series ===
From November 2015 a series of hardcover collections was released containing up to six stories in each volume.

- James Bond – SPECTRE: The Complete Comic Strip Collection (November 2015) — Thunderball, The Spy Who Loved Me, On Her Majesty’s Secret Service and You Only Live Twice
- The Complete James Bond – Dr No: The Classic Comic Strip Collection 1958–60 (November 2016) — Casino Royale, Live and Let Die, Moonraker, Diamonds Are Forever, From Russia with Love and Dr. No
- The Complete James Bond – Goldfinger: The Classic Comic Strip Collection 1960–66 (March 2017) — Goldfinger, Risico, From a View to a Kill, For Your Eyes Only, The Man with the Golden Gun and The Living Daylights
- The Complete James Bond – Octopussy: The Classic Comic Strip Collection 1966–69 (November 2017) — Octopussy, The Hildebrand Rarity, The Harpies, River of Death

== See also ==
- James Bond comic books
- Outline of James Bond
