= The Man with the Golden Gun (novel) =

1965 novel by Ian Fleming

- 1965 first edition wraparound cover
- Author: Ian Fleming
- Cover artist: Richard Chopping
- Language: English
- Series: James Bond
- Genre: Spy fiction
- Publisher: Jonathan Cape
- Publication date: 1 April 1965
- Publication place: United Kingdom
- Media type: Print (hardback & paperback)
- Pages: 221
- Preceded by: You Only Live Twice
- Followed by: Octopussy and The Living Daylights

The Man with the Golden Gun is the twelfth and final novel in Ian Fleming's James Bond series and the thirteenth Bond book overall. It was first published by Jonathan Cape in the United Kingdom on 1 April 1965, eight months after the author's death, and was a best-seller. The novel was not as detailed or polished as the others in the series, leading to poor but polite reviews.

The story involves the fictional British Secret Service operative James Bond, who had been posted missing, presumed dead, after his last mission in Japan. Bond returns to Britain via the Soviet Union, where he had been brainwashed and sent to assassinate his superior, M. After being de-programmed by the MI6 doctors, Bond is sent to the Caribbean to find and kill Francisco Scaramanga, the titular "Man with the Golden Gun".

The first draft and part of the editing process was completed before Fleming's death and the manuscript had passed through the hands of his copy editor, William Plomer. Much of the detail contained in the previous novels was missing, as this was often added by Fleming in the second draft. The publishers Jonathan Cape passed the manuscript to the writer and Bond aficionado Kingsley Amis for his thoughts and advice on the story, although his suggestions were not used.

The novel was serialised in 1965, firstly in the Daily Express and then in Playboy; in 1966 a daily comic strip adaptation was also published in the Daily Express. In 1974 the book was loosely adapted as the ninth film in the Eon Productions James Bond series, with Roger Moore playing Bond and Fleming's step-cousin, Christopher Lee, as Scaramanga.

== Plot ==
A year after James Bond's final confrontation with Ernst Stavro Blofeld, while on a mission in Japan, a man claiming to be Bond appears in London and demands to meet M, the head of the Secret Service. Bond's identity is confirmed, but during his debriefing interview with M, Bond tries to kill him with a cyanide pistol; the attempt fails. The Service learns that after destroying Blofeld's castle in Japan, Bond suffered a head injury and developed amnesia. Having lived as a Japanese fisherman for several months, Bond travelled to the Soviet Union to learn his true identity. While there, he was brainwashed and assigned to kill M upon his return to England.

Now de-programmed, Bond is given a chance to again prove his worth as a member of the 00 section following the assassination attempt. M sends Bond to Jamaica and gives him the seemingly impossible mission of killing Francisco Scaramanga, a Cuban assassin who is believed to have killed several British secret agents. Scaramanga is known as "The Man with the Golden Gun" because his weapon of choice is a gold-plated Colt .45 revolver, which fires silver-jacketed, gold-cored dumdum bullets.

Bond locates Scaramanga in a Jamaican bordello and manages to become his temporary personal assistant under the name "Mark Hazard". He learns that Scaramanga is involved in a hotel development on the island with a group of investors that consists of a syndicate of American gangsters and the KGB. Scaramanga and the other investors are also engaged in a scheme to destabilise Western interests in the Caribbean's sugar industry and increase the value of the Cuban sugar crop, running drugs into America, smuggling prostitutes from Mexico into America and operating casinos in Jamaica that will cause friction between tourists and the locals.

Bond discovers that he has an ally who is also working undercover at the half-built resort, Felix Leiter, who has been recalled to duty by the Central Intelligence Agency (CIA) and is working ostensibly as an electrical engineer while setting up listening devices in Scaramanga's meeting room. They learn that Scaramanga plans to eliminate Bond when the weekend is over. Bond's true identity is confirmed by a KGB agent and Scaramanga makes new plans to entertain the gangsters and the KGB agent by killing Bond while they are riding a sight-seeing train to a marina. Bond manages to turn the tables on Scaramanga and, with the help of Leiter, kill most of the conspirators. Wounded, Scaramanga escapes into the swamps, where Bond pursues him. Scaramanga lulls Bond off-guard and shoots him with a hidden golden derringer. Bond is hit but returns fire and shoots Scaramanga several times, killing him.

== Background and writing history ==
By January 1964 Ian Fleming had published eleven books of the Bond series in eleven years: ten novels and a collection of short stories. (Note: The books were Casino Royale (1953), Live and Let Die (1954), Moonraker (1955), Diamonds Are Forever (1956), From Russia, with Love (1957), Dr. No (1958), Goldfinger (1959), Thunderball (1961), The Spy Who Loved Me (1962), On Her Majesty's Secret Service (1963) and the short story collection For Your Eyes Only (1960).) A twelfth book, You Only Live Twice, was being edited and prepared for production; it was released on 1 April 1963. Fleming wrote The Man with the Golden Gun at his Goldeneye estate in Jamaica in January and February 1964, completing it by the beginning of March. His declining health affected him badly during the writing process and he dropped from his usual rate of two thousand words in four hours a day to a little over an hour's worth of work a day. (Note: Fleming outlined his normal writing practice in May 1963: "I write for about three hours in the morning ... and I do another hour's work between six and seven in the evening. I never correct anything and I never go back to see what I have written ... By following my formula, you write 2,000 words a day.") Fleming's wife, Ann, was concerned about the effect it was having on her husband, and wrote to her brother that "it is painful to see Ian struggle to give birth to Bond". Fleming based his title on Nelson Algren's 1949 novel The Man with the Golden Arm; he also considered Goldenrod and Number 3½ Love Lane.

Fleming returned to Britain with a completed first draft of the manuscript in March 1964 and wrote to his friend and copy editor William Plomer saying it needed a lot of rewriting. He also told Plomer "This is, alas, the last Bond and, again alas, I mean it, for I really have run out of puff and zest". By 10 May 1964 Fleming had been working on proofreading his manuscript and had corrected the first two-thirds of the book; he wrote to Plomer that he had not decided "whether to publish in 1965 or give it another year's working over so that we can go out with a bang instead of a whimper". He said he "would personally like to take it back to Jamaica and paint the lily next year". (Note: "Paint the lily" is a quote from Shakespeare's King John: "To gild refined Gold, to paint the lily; To throw a perfume on the violet, ... is wasteful, and ridiculous excess".) He went on that as it was his final Bond novel, he did not want "to short-weight my faithful readers on the dernier service". He became increasingly unhappy with the book, but was persuaded by Plomer that the novel was fit for publication. Five months after returning from Jamaica, on the morning of 12 August 1964, Fleming died of a heart attack. His obituary in The Times noted that he "had completed and was revising a new novel, The Man with the Golden Gun".

Despite Plomer's original thought about the state of the manuscript, Fleming's publishers, Jonathan Cape, were concerned enough about the story to pass the manuscript to the writer Kingsley Amis to read on holiday. He was paid £35 15 shillings for his thoughts and advice, although his subsequent suggestions were not used by Cape. (Note: £35 15s in 1964 is approximately equivalent to £630 in 2025, according to calculations based on the Consumer Price Index measure of inflation.) Cape had taken the step because they thought the novel was not up to Fleming's usual standard. Raymond Benson, the author of the continuation Bond novels, has noted that the novel is missing the rich detail and descriptions which are normally present in Fleming's work; he suggests that these details were normally worked into the second draft by Fleming, but their absence shows that no such additional work was done on this occasion. The Man with the Golden Gun was published posthumously, eight months after its author's death.

Although Fleming did not date the events within his novels, John Griswold and Henry Chancellor—both of whom wrote books for Ian Fleming Publications—have identified timelines based on episodes and situations within the novel series as a whole. Chancellor put the events of The Man with the Golden Gun in 1963; Griswold is more precise and considers the story to have taken place between November 1963 and the end of February 1964.

== Development ==
=== Inspirations ===
As with his previous novels, Fleming used events from his past as elements in his novel. While in Kitzbühel, Austria, in the 1930s, Fleming's car, a Standard Tourer, had been struck by a train at a level crossing, dragging him fifty yards along the track. From that time on he had associated trains with death, which led to their use as a plot device not just in The Man with the Golden Gun, but also in Live and Let Die, Diamonds Are Forever and From Russia, with Love. Chancellor also considers that one of Fleming's earlier novels, Goldfinger, was an influence on The Man with the Golden Gun, with the conference of gangsters from different gangs being used in both stories; in both novels—and in Moonraker—Bond, in an undercover capacity, acted as a male secretary to the villain.

As well as using events from his past, Fleming also used names of individuals he knew for some of his characters. The editor of The London Magazine, Alan Ross, had provided Fleming with details about the effects of the electroshock therapy that Bond went through and, by way of thanks, the novel's SIS station chief in Jamaica, Commander Ross, was named after him. Fleming used the name of the secretary of the Royal St George's Golf Club, Nick Nicholson, for the novel's CIA representative at the hotel. Tony Hugill, the sugar planter mentioned in the book, was named after a member of 30 AU—the commando unit formed by Fleming during the war—who managed the Tate & Lyle plantations in the West Indies after the war. The book's main villain, Francisco Scaramanga, was named after George Scaramanga, an Etonian contemporary of Fleming's; the pair are said to have fought at school. Fleming also used the surname of his friend, Morris Cargill, a columnist on The Gleaner, as the name of the Justice of the Jamaican Supreme Court at the end of the book.

The effects of the two Eon Productions Bond films released before the writing of the novel—Dr. No and From Russia with Love—were reflected in the novel through the increased number of gadgets used. One of these was the poison gun used in the attempted assassination of M. The idea was taken from the story of Bohdan Stashynsky, who defected from the Eastern Bloc to the West in 1961. Stashynsky was put on trial for the murder of Ukrainian nationalist leaders Lev Rebet and Stepan Bandera and stated that he had used a poison-spray gun to do it.

=== Characters ===
The central character of The Man with the Golden Gun is James Bond. He begins the novel having been brainwashed by the Soviets, but is soon de-programmed by the Secret Service. Amis considers that the "brainwashing and de-brainwashing have evidently taken their toll, ... [as] on his last appearance 007 is, sadly, more of a man without qualities than ever before". Benson considers the character to have a different personality from the previous stories and to be robot-like; Benson also points out that the touches of humour displayed by Bond in the previous novels disappeared and he appeared in the book as cold and emotionless. Benson felt that Bond's character had not been developed any further than in the previous books. while Amis thinks Bond's personality has regenerated into "a more mature stage".

The historian Jeremy Black notes that when given the opportunity to kill Scaramanga in cold blood, Bond cannot bring himself to do it. Sitting behind Scaramanga in a car, he considers shooting him in the back of the head (what he describes as "the old Gestapo-KGB point of puncture") but decides against it for a number of reasons:

the itch of curiosity, an inbuilt dislike of cold murder, the feeling that this was not the predestined moment, the likelihood that he would have to murder the chauffeur also—these, combined with the softness of the night and the fact that the 'Sound System' was now playing a good recording of one of his favourites, "After You've Gone", and that cicadas were singing from the lignum vitae tree, said 'No'.

Black describes how the mention of the Gestapo serves as a frame of reference to readers, separating Bond from the methods of the Nazis. While Bond is described as a blunt instrument, he is not a cold-blooded killer and he has to rise above the actions of such enemies and act more suitably for a British fictional hero. With this moral sense on display, Bond is portrayed as a gentleman. Once the mission is completed, Bond is offered the KCMG, but he refuses the honour and reflects on his own name, "a quiet, dull, anonymous name", which had been Fleming's aim when he first named the character.

For the first time in the Bond canon, M's full name and title of "Admiral Sir Miles Messervy KCMG" was finally revealed. Despite being the target of the failed assassination attempt, not only does M not press charges against Bond, he sends him out on further missions.

According to Benson, the main adversary of the novel, Francisco Scaramanga, is more a henchman than a major adversary and "a second-rate, smalltime crook who happens to have gotten lucky with his shooting". The weakness of the villain affects the standard of the novel; according to Chancellor the two weakest books in the Bond canon—The Spy Who Loved Me and The Man with the Golden Gun—are the stories that do not have "an older, super-intelligent villain", while Amis writes "the overall inferiority of The Man with the Golden Gun is typified by the ordinariness of Scaramanga, who entirely lacks the physical presence of Bond-villain at his best and remains a mere trigger-man whatever his (undemonstrated) deadliness".

The Anglicist Vivian Halloran notes that Scaramanga had the same character profile as Herr von Hammerstein, the former Gestapo officer who is the chief of counterintelligence for the Cuban secret service in "For Your Eyes Only". Both characters use their criminal expertise in the service of communist Cuba and invest in casinos in Jamaica. The literary critic Meir Sternberg observes that many of the Bond villains are monstrous—a definition in which he includes deformity of one of the parts of their bodies; (Note: Sternberg cites other examples: Mr. Big (Live and Let Die) is huge, with a head described as "twice the normal size and very nearly round", Emilio Largo (Thunderball) has hands that are "almost twice the normal size, even for a man of his stature ... They looked ... almost like large brown furry animals quite separate from their owner" and Drax (Moonraker) has very broad shoulders, a large head and protruding teeth with diastema; his face is badly scarred from a wartime explosion) Scaramanga is one of these, possessing three nipples. The significance is described in the novel as "a sign of invulnerability and great sexual prowess" to local cults. Benson writes that despite the reference in the early chapters—in the Secret Service file on Scaramanga—the characteristic does not feature in the rest of the novel, nor does Scaramanga's impotence, which is also on the file.

== Style ==
Within the text Benson identifies what he describes as the "Fleming Sweep", the use of "hooks" at the end of chapters to heighten tension and pull the reader into the next. In The Man with the Golden Gun, the sweep is used to keep the storyline moving along at pace. Benson comments that it moves the story too quickly in places, and gives the example that Bond's deprogramming is missing from the story.

Fleming later said of his work, "while thrillers may not be Literature with a capital L, it is possible to write what I can best describe as 'thrillers designed to be read as literature'." He used well-known brand names and everyday details to produce a sense of realism, which Amis called "the Fleming effect". (Note: The "Fleming effect" was a mechanism he used in many of his novels; Rupert Hart-Davis, the publisher and editor who was a close friend of Fleming's brother Peter, later remarked that "when Ian Fleming mentions any particular food, clothing or cigarettes in his books, the makers reward him with presents in kind ... Ian's are the only modern thrillers with built-in commercials.") Amis describes it as "the imaginative use of information, whereby the pervading fantastic nature of Bond's world ... [is] bolted down to some sort of reality, or at least counter-balanced". Amis wrote of that the lack of the effect was one of "the deficiencies of The Man with the Golden Gun—no decent villain, no decent conspiracy, no branded goods except Bond's new Hoffritz razor". Benson highlighted the lack of detail and descriptions; he notes that these were normally added by Fleming in the second draft of the story, which could explain their absence.

== Themes ==
The Man with the Golden Gun is one of three Bond novels to deal with the disruption of markets and the economy. (Note: Goldfinger focuses on gold and On Her Majesty's Secret Service deals with threats to the food supply.) The novel includes sugar price fixing in the Caribbean, and the importance of open markets in world trade. Scaramanga provides the Rastafarians with drugs in return for arson in the sugar plantations to raise sugar prices. This was a return of the theme used in Fleming's 1960 short story "Risico", of drugs being used for political purposes to undermine the West. The arson was part of a wider conspiracy by Scaramanga and his KGB connection, Hendricks, to destabilise the region by a campaign of industrial sabotage against companies based in Jamaica, including Reynolds Metal, Kaiser Bauxite and Aluminia.

The changing fortunes of the British Empire are reflected in The Man with the Golden Gun. In contrast to Live and Let Die (1954) and Dr No (1958), in which Jamaica was still part of the Empire and was the Secret Service's territory, by the time of The Man with the Golden Gun, Jamaica had attained full independence, and the Central Intelligence Agency were operating there without the need for permission from the Secret Service. Parker notes that, despite the independence, neither the UK nor the US informed or involved the Jamaican authorities about their investigations until afterwards. Black notes that the independent inquiry at the end of the novel, conducted in Bond's hospital bedroom, was undertaken by the Jamaican judiciary and the CIA and MI6 were recorded as acting "under the closest liaison and direction of the Jamaican CID"; Bond and Leiter are also awarded the Jamaican Police Medal for "Services to the Independent State of Jamaica." Black observes that this was the new world of a non-colonial, independent Jamaica, underlining the collapse of the British Empire.

== Release and reception ==
=== Publication history ===
The Man with the Golden Gun was published in the UK on 1 April 1965 by Jonathan Cape, was 221 pages long and cost eighteen shillings. Fleming's regular cover artist Richard Chopping undertook the cover design again and was paid 300 guineas for the artwork. (Note: A guinea was originally a gold coin whose value was fixed at twenty-one shillings (£1.05). By this date the coin was obsolete and the term simply functioned as a label for that sum. According to calculations based on the Consumer Price Index measure of inflation, 300 guineas in 1965 is approximately £5,330 in 2025.) Chopping's design caused him problems, as it was not possible to show the full gun on the front cover at the scale he wanted, so he had to make it a wraparound cover, with the barrel extending onto the back cover. He also incorporated the skull of a snake, which echoed the appearance of a snake at the book's climax. The illustration was based on a real gold-plated Colt SAA, which was hired from a gunsmith. Some booksellers did not like the wraparound cover, as it meant they had to display the books open for people to see the full cover.

The Man with the Golden Gun was published in the US in August 1965 by New American Library, was 183 pages long and cost $4.50. Even before the US edition was published, The Man with the Golden Gun was ninth place on the best-seller lists, with 80,000 pre-orders for the hardback version.

In July 1966 Pan Books published a paperback version of The Man with the Golden Gun in the UK that sold 273,000 copies before the end of the year and 485,000 in 1967. Since its initial publication the book has been re-issued in hardback and paperback editions, translated into several languages and, as at 2025, has never been out of print.

=== Critical reception ===
The reviews for The Man with the Golden Gun provided little praise although much of the criticism was muted, possibly, according to Parker, because of Fleming's death. Chancellor considers that the reviews were "polite and rather sad ... recognising that the book had effectively been left half-finished, and as such did not represent Fleming at the top of his game". Amis's review in the New Statesman described the novel as "a sadly empty tale, empty of the interests and effects that for better or worse, Ian Fleming made his own". Amis pointed to what he considered weaknesses in the novel, and questioned whether these showed that parts of the manuscript could have done with more work. (Note: This included a lack of clarity over why Scaramanga hired Bond, why nothing appeared in the novel about the entries in Scaramanga's file that he was a closet homosexual and had a pistol fetish.) Also observing that there were points, particularly at the beginning of the book, which Fleming did not follow up was the Evening Standard's reviewer, Richard Lister, although he did not indicate which points. Another who questioned the unpolished nature of the book was Maurice Richardson of The Observer, who wrote that "perhaps Ian Fleming was very tired when he wrote it. Perhaps ... he left it unrevised. The fact remains that this posthumous Bond is a sadly sub-standard job."

Some critics viewed the novel in the light of other Bond books. Richardson's review contained some muted praise when he wrote "it isn't of course by any means totally unreadable but it's depressingly far from the best Bond". Writing in The Guardian, Christopher Wordsworth wrote "the distance between Live and Let Die, Ian Fleming's second and best, and You Only Live Twice, his last and worst, is a long iron down the Sandwich fairway." Calling The Man with the Golden Gun a "farrago", Wordsworth thought that "since Goldfinger 007 has been toiling hopelessly in the wake of the Zeitgeist".

Some reviewers viewed The Man with the Golden Gun in the light of other works in the genre. William Trevor, writing in The Listener, was dismissive of the work, thinking that "Bond continues to behave with so little originality that neither Templar nor Drummond, Marlowe nor Nick Charles, would have paused to waste a pellet on him"; he continued, saying that "this present work is once again a fantasy for grown-up children, neither as clever nor exciting as the early thrillers of Edgar Wallace or the boys adventure stories of fifty years ago". D.A.N. Jones, writing in The New York Review of Books, thought The Man with the Golden Gun was "an innocuous run-of-the-mill adventure story of 1911 vintage". Looking at the wider impact of Fleming and his work, Anthony Lejeune, writing in the National Review, thought that it "is undeniably slight, but, like everything Fleming wrote, intensely readable ... In a sense Fleming's job was finished. He had irrevocably transformed the genre in which he worked". Lejeune went on to say that "in highbrow novels sex and violence are treated gloomily: in Fleming's stories they are presented cheerfully with full enjoyment."

The critic for Time was damning, saying that "It may have been just as well that Fleming died when everybody still thought he could do no wrong". the critic for Newsweek said that "James Bond should have had a better exit. Sadly [it] ... ends not with a bang but a whimper. The world will be a vastly more lacklustre and complicated place with 007 gone." The novel was generally reviewed more positively in the US than in the UK, Benson opines, and the Associated Press wrote that "Bond and Fleming were fun. They entertained, sometimes mildly, often grandly – but always consistently. Life will be less interesting without them." In his review for The New York Times, Charles Poore wrote that The Man with the Golden Gun was "a gory, glittering saga". Poore noted that "The Gee-whizzery ... starts early and never flags" and that, despite Fleming's death, "the James Bond spirit soars on". The critic for Books and Bookmen lamented the fact that "Bond has gone out like a lamb; even the girls are below par, while the villain seems like a refuge from a seedy Western. But we'll miss our James".

== Adaptations ==
The Man with the Golden Gun was serialised in the Daily Express newspaper in ten daily parts from 22 March 1965 onwards. The novel was also adapted as a daily comic strip which was published in the same newspaper and syndicated around the world. The adaptation, written by Jim Lawrence and illustrated by Yaroslav Horak, ran from 10 January to 10 September 1966. The strip was reprinted by Titan Books in June 1987 and reissued in 2004. Titan reissued the strip again in The James Bond Omnibus Vol. 002, published in 2011. The novel was also serialised over four issues of Playboy from April to July 1965.

In 1974 Eon Productions made the ninth Bond film, loosely based on the novel. The film starred Roger Moore as Bond and Fleming's cousin, Christopher Lee, as Scaramanga. The film moved away from Jamaica to the Far East and borrowed from the martial arts genre that was popular in the 1970s. The plot also changed and used the 1973 energy crisis as a backdrop to the film, allowing the MacGuffin of the "Solex agitator" to be introduced. The Man with the Golden Gun was dramatised as a 90-minute radio play on BBC Radio 4 in March 2020; Toby Stephens played Bond.

== See also ==
- Outline of James Bond

== Notes and references ==
=== Sources ===
==== Books ====
- Amis, Kingsley (1966). The James Bond Dossier. London: Pan Books. OCLC 154139618.
- Barnes, Alan; Hearn, Marcus (2001). Kiss Kiss Bang! Bang!: The Unofficial James Bond Film Companion. London: Batsford Books. ISBN 978-0-7134-8645-2.
- Bennett, Tony; Woollacott, Janet (2009). "The Moments of Bond". In Lindner, Christoph (ed.). The James Bond Phenomenon: A Critical Reader. Manchester: Manchester University Press. ISBN 978-0-7190-6541-5.
- Benson, Raymond (1988). The James Bond Bedside Companion. London: Boxtree Ltd. ISBN 978-1-8528-3233-9.
- Besly, Edward (1997). Loose Change: A Guide to Common Coins and Medals. Cardiff: National Museum Wales. ISBN 978-0-7200-0444-1.
- Black, Jeremy (2005). The Politics of James Bond: From Fleming's Novel to the Big Screen. Lincoln, Nebraska: University of Nebraska Press. ISBN 978-0-8032-6240-9.
- Boothroyd, Geoffrey (1970). The Handgun. New York: Bonanza Books. ISBN 978-0-5171-3238-8.
- Butler, William Vivian (1973). The Durable Desperadoes. London: Macmillan. ISBN 978-0-333-14217-2.
- Chancellor, Henry (2005). James Bond: The Man and His World. London: John Murray. ISBN 978-0-7195-6815-2.
- Fleming, Fergus (2015). The Man with the Golden Typewriter: Ian Fleming's James Bond Letters. New York: Bloomsbury. ISBN 978-1-6328-6489-5.
- Fleming, Ian (1961). Thunderball. London: Jonathan Cape. OCLC 822821743.
- Fleming, Ian (1964). Live and Let Die. London: Pan Books. OCLC 634076547.
- Fleming, Ian (1966). The Man With the Golden Gun. London: Pan Books. OCLC 752863676.
- Fleming, Ian (1975). Moonraker. London: Jonathan Cape. ISBN 978-0-2246-0200-6.
- Fleming, Ian; Gammidge, Henry; McLusky, John (1988). Octopussy. London: Titan Books. ISBN 1-8528-6040-5.
- Fleming, Ian (2009). "Ian Fleming on Writing Thrillers". Devil May Care. By Faulks, Sebastian. London: Penguin Books. pp. 314–321. ISBN 978-0-1410-3545-1.
- Gilbert, Jon (2012). Ian Fleming: The Bibliography. London: Queen Anne Press. ISBN 978-0-9558-1897-4.
- Griswold, John (2006). Ian Fleming's James Bond: Annotations and Chronologies for Ian Fleming's Bond Stories. Bloomington, Indiana: AuthorHouse. ISBN 978-1-4259-3100-1.
- Halloran, Vivian (2005). "Tropical Bond". In Comentale, Edward P.; Watt, Stephen; Willman, Skip (eds.). Ian Fleming and James Bond: The Cultural Politics of 007. Bloomington, Indiana: Indiana University Press. pp. 158–177. ISBN 978-0-2533-4523-3.
- Hines, Claire (2018). The Playboy and James Bond: 007, Ian Fleming and Playboy Magazine. Manchester: Manchester University Press. ISBN 978-0-7190-8226-9.
- Lycett, Andrew (1996). Ian Fleming. London: Phoenix. ISBN 978-1-8579-9783-5.
- Lyttelton, George; Hart-Davis, Rupert (1979). Lyttelton–Hart-Davis Letters. Vol. 2. London: John Murray. ISBN 978-0-7195-3673-1.
- Macintyre, Ben (2008). For Your Eyes Only. London: Bloomsbury Publishing. ISBN 978-0-7475-9527-4.
- McLusky, John; Gammidge, Henry; Lawrence, Jim; Fleming, Ian; Horak, Yaroslav (2011). The James Bond Omnibus Vol. 2. London: Titan Books. ISBN 978-1-8485-6432-9.
- Parker, Matthew (2014). Goldeneye. London: Hutchinson. ISBN 978-0-0919-5410-9.
- Smith, Jim; Lavington, Stephen (2002). Bond Films. London: Virgin Books. ISBN 978-0-7535-0709-4.

==== Journals and magazines ====
- Amis, Kingsley (2 April 1965). "M for Murder". New Statesman. pp. 540–541.
- Lejeune, Anthony (7 September 1965). "To Valhalla with Twin Exhausts". National Review. pp. 776–777.
- Sternberg, Meir (Spring 1983). "Knight Meets Dragon in the James Bond Saga: Realism and Reality-Models". Style. 17 (2). University Park, Pennsylvania: Penn State University Press: 142–80. JSTOR 42945465. (subscription required)
- Trevor, William (1 April 1965). "New Fiction". The Listener. p. 497.

==== News ====
- "Bond is Back". Daily Express. 18 March 1965. p. 1.
- "Books: Current & Various". Time. 10 September 1965. p. 1. Archived from the original on 3 February 2011.
- Jones, D.A.N. (14 October 1965). "Bondage". The New York Review of Books. Archived from the original on 1 December 2024.
- Lister, Richard (6 April 1965). "The Final 007". Evening Standard. p. 9.
- "Obituary: Mr Ian Fleming". The Times. 13 August 1964. p. 12.
- Poore, Charles (26 August 1965). "Books of the Times". The New York Times. p. 31.
- Richardson, Maurice (4 April 1965). "Bond's Last Case". The Observer. p. 26.
- Wordsworth, Christopher (2 April 1965). "Trouble in Crete". The Guardian. p. 8.

==== Websites ====
- Britt, Ryan (13 April 2023). "A Journey Inside the Updated James Bond Novels". Esquire. Archived from the original on 1 December 2024.
- Clark, Gregory (2023). "The Annual RPI and Average Earnings for Britain, 1209 to Present (New Series)". MeasuringWorth. Archived from the original on 1 April 2023.
- Cull, Tom (1 April 2015). "Ian Fleming's Golden Farewell". Ian Fleming Publications. Archived from the original on 1 December 2024.
- "Ian Fleming's James Bond Titles". Ian Fleming Publications. Archived from the original on 10 August 2015.
- "lily". Oxford English Dictionary (online ed.). Oxford University Press. (Subscription or participating institution membership required.)
- "The Man with the Golden Gun". BBC Genome. 14 March 2020. Archived from the original on 1 December 2024.
- "The Man with the Golden Gun". BBC. Archived from the original on 24 August 2022.
- "The Man with the Golden Gun". WorldCat.
