= The Spy Who Loved Me (novel) =

James Bond novel by Ian Fleming

- First edition cover, published by Jonathan Cape
- Author: Ian Fleming
- Cover artist: Richard Chopping
- Language: English
- Series: James Bond
- Genre: Spy fiction
- Publisher: Jonathan Cape
- Publication date: 16 April 1962
- Publication place: United Kingdom
- Media type: Print (hardback & paperback)
- Pages: 221
- Preceded by: Thunderball
- Followed by: On Her Majesty's Secret Service

The Spy Who Loved Me is the ninth novel and tenth book in Ian Fleming's James Bond series, first published by Jonathan Cape on 16 April 1962. (Note: The novels are: Casino Royale (1953), Live and Let Die (1954), Moonraker (1955), Diamonds Are Forever (1956), From Russia, with Love (1957), Dr. No (1958), Goldfinger (1959) and Thunderball (1961); a short story collection, For Your Eyes Only, was published in 1960.) It is the shortest and most sexually explicit of Fleming's novels, as well as the only Bond novel told in the first person. Its narrator is a young Canadian woman, Viv Michel. Bond himself does not appear until two-thirds of the way through the book, arriving at precisely the right moment to save Viv from being raped and murdered by two criminals. Fleming wrote a prologue to the novel giving the character Viv credit as a co-author.

The story uses a recurring motif of Saint George against the dragon, and contains themes of power, and the moral ambiguity between those acting with good and evil intent. As the narrator who tells her own backstory and expresses her emotions and motives, Viv has been described as the best realised and most rounded female character in the Bond canon. The reviewers were largely negative, with some expressing a desire for a return to the structure and form of the previous Bond novels. In a letter to his editor after the reviews had been published, Fleming reflected that "the experiment has obviously gone very much awry".

Following the negative reactions of critics, Fleming attempted to suppress elements of the novel: he blocked a paperback edition in the United Kingdom and, when he sold the film rights to Harry Saltzman and Albert R. Broccoli, they were permitted to use the title but none of the plot of the book. In the 1977 film The Spy Who Loved Me, the tenth in the Eon Productions series and the third to star Roger Moore as Bond. The title and the character of one of the villains, Jaws, are taken from the book. A heavily adapted version of The Spy Who Loved Me appeared in The Daily Express newspaper in daily comic strip format between 1967 and 1968; a British paperback edition of the novel was published after Fleming's death.

== Plot summary ==
Fleming structured the novel in three sections—"Me", "Them" and "Him"—to describe the phases of the story. In the prologue he described the origin of the manuscript:

I found what follows lying on my desk one morning. As you will see, it appears to be the first-person story of a young woman, evidently beautiful and not unskilled in the arts of love. According to her story, she appears to have been involved, both perilously and romantically, with the same James Bond whose secret service exploits I myself have written from time to time. With the manuscript was a note signed "Vivienne Michel" assuring me that what she had written was "purest truth and from the depths of her heart". I was interested in this view of James Bond, through the wrong end of the telescope so to speak, and after obtaining clearance for certain minor infringements of the Official Secrets Act I have much pleasure in sponsoring its publication.

Me
Vivienne "Viv" Michel, a young Canadian woman, narrates her own story, detailing her past love affairs. The first was with Derek Mallaby: the couple had sex in a field after being thrown out of a cinema in Windsor for indecent exposure. Their physical relationship ended that night, and Viv was subsequently rejected when Mallaby sent her a letter from Oxford University, where he was studying, saying he was forcibly engaged to someone else by his parents. Viv's second love affair was with her German employer, Kurt Rainer, by whom she eventually became pregnant. She informed Rainer and he paid for her to go to Switzerland to have an abortion, telling her that their affair was over. After the procedure, Viv returned to her native Canada and started on a journey through North America. She stopped in the Adirondack Mountains to work at the Dreamy Pines motel, in the employ of the managers Jed and Mildred Phancey.

Them
At the end of the vacation season, the Phanceys entrust Viv with looking after the motel for the night before the owner, Mr Sanguinetti, can arrive to take inventory and close it up for the winter. Two mobsters, "Sluggsy" Morant and the steel-toothed Sol "Horror" Horowitz, both of whom work for Sanguinetti, arrive and say they are there to look over the motel for insurance purposes. The two have been hired by Sanguinetti to burn down the motel so that he can make a fraudulent insurance claim. The blame for the fire would fall on Viv, who was to perish in the incident. The men immediately start harassing Viv, making crude passes and aggressively asking her to dance; when she says she does not want to, they attack her, intending to rape her, when the door buzzer interrupts them.

Him
The British secret service agent James Bond appears at the door asking for a room, having had a flat tyre while passing. Bond soon realises that Horror and Sluggsy are mobsters and that Viv is in danger. Bond pressures the gangsters into providing him a room. Bond tells Viv that he is in America in the wake of Operation Thunderball and had been detailed to protect a Russian nuclear expert who defected to the West. (Note: The Spy Who Loved Me continues the story from Thunderball (published in 1961) in which the terrorist organisation SPECTRE tried to hold the UK and US to ransom by threatening them with two nuclear bombs.) That night Sluggsy and Horror set fire to the motel and attempt to kill Bond and Viv. A gun battle ensues and, during their escape, Horror and Sluggsy's car crashes into a lake. Bond and Viv retire to bed, but Sluggsy is still alive and makes a further attempt to kill them, before Bond shoots him dead.

Viv wakes to find Bond gone, leaving a note in which he promises to send her police assistance and which he concludes by telling her not to dwell too much on the ugly events through which she has just lived. As Viv finishes reading the note, a large police detachment arrives. After taking her statement, the officer in charge of the detail reiterates Bond's advice, but also warns Viv that all men involved in violent crime and espionage, regardless of which side they are on—including Bond himself—are dangerous and that she should avoid them. Viv reflects on this as she drives off at the end of the book, continuing her tour of America; despite the officer's warning, she still devotes her thoughts to Bond.

== Background and writing history ==
By January 1961 the author Ian Fleming had published eight books in the preceding eight years: seven novels and a collection of short stories. (Note: The books were Casino Royale (1953), Live and Let Die (1954), Moonraker (1955), Diamonds Are Forever (1956), From Russia, with Love (1957), Dr. No (1958), Goldfinger (1959) and the short story collection For Your Eyes Only (1960).) A ninth book, Thunderball, was being edited and prepared for production; it was released at the end of March 1961. Fleming travelled to his Goldeneye estate in Jamaica in January to write The Spy Who Loved Me. He followed his usual practice, which he later outlined in Books and Bookmen magazine: "I write for about three hours in the morning ... and I do another hour's work between six and seven in the evening. I never correct anything and I never go back to see what I have written ... By following my formula, you write 2,000 words a day." He found writing The Spy Who Loved Me easier than any of his other books.

Fleming returned to London in March that year with a 113-page typescript, the shortest of any of the Bond books. Few alterations were made to the story before publication. After the book was published he wrote to Michael Howard, his editor at Jonathan Cape, to explain why he had changed his approach:

I had become increasingly surprised to find that my thrillers, which were designed for an adult audience, were being read in schools, and that young people were making a hero out of James Bond ... So it crossed my mind to write a cautionary tale about Bond, to put the record straight in the minds particularly of younger readers.
It was impossible to do this in my usual narrative style and I therefore invented the fiction of a heroine through whom I could examine Bond from the other end of the gun barrel, so to speak. This I did by telling the story in her own words of her upbringing and love life, which consisted of two incidents, both of which were of a strongly cautionary nature.

Fleming found writing the Bond novels increasingly arduous and had thoughts of finishing the series by killing Bond in The Spy Who Loved Me, but changed his mind while writing. The novel is described by Fleming's biographer Andrew Lycett as Fleming's "most sleazy and violent story ever". This, writes Lycett, may have been a reflection of Fleming's state of mind at the time, particularly his ongoing marital difficulties: he was having an affair with his neighbour in Jamaica, Blanche Blackwell, and his wife Ann was in a relationship with Hugh Gaitskell, the Leader of the British Labour Party. Fleming also had a strained professional relationship with the writer and director, Kevin McClory, with whom he was working on a film treatment which eventually Fleming published as the novel Thunderball. (Note: McClory and the screenwriter Jack Whittingham—who also worked on the treatment—sued Fleming for plagiarism in the High Court, London. The stress from the Thunderball matter was likely one of the causes of Fleming's heart attack in April 1961.)

Although Fleming did not date the events within his novels, John Griswold and Henry Chancellor—both of whom wrote books for Ian Fleming Publications—identified different timelines based on events and situations within the novel series as a whole. Chancellor put the events of The Spy Who Loved Me in 1960; Griswold considers the story to have taken place in October 1961.

== Development ==
=== Plot inspirations ===
For The Spy Who Loved Me, Fleming borrowed from his surroundings and experiences, as he had done with all his writing up to that point. The Dreamy Pines Motel in the Adirondacks was based on one Fleming would drive past on the way to a friend's Black Hole Hollow Farm in Vermont; Viv is seduced by Derek, a public school boy, in the Royalty Kinema, Windsor, in the same way Fleming—while at the nearby public school Eton—seduced a woman and lost his virginity in the same establishment. Her time with Derek in the area around Cookham, Berkshire, is similar to Fleming's activities and experiences while he was at the Royal Military College, Sandhurst.

As he had done in his previous novels, Fleming borrowed names from his friends and associates to use in his book: Robert Harling, a colleague at The Sunday Times, gave his name to a printer in the story while another minor character, Frank Donaldson, was named after Jack Donaldson, a friend of Ann Fleming. One of Fleming's neighbours in Jamaica was Vivienne Stuart, whose first name Fleming used for the novel's central character.

=== Characters ===
The novelist Raymond Benson—who later wrote a series of Bond novels—sees Vivienne Michel as the best-realised female characterisation undertaken by Fleming, partly because the story is told in the first-person narrative with the first third of the novel dedicated to her biography. Benson notes that while Viv has been a victim of life in the past, she is wilful and tough too. Viv is not a fashionable stylish woman of the 1950s, but one who likes camping, fishing and other outdoor activities; Chancellor states that in this respect, she is, like Bond, an ideal from Fleming's imagination.

The academic Christine Bold considers that Viv demonstrates a naïve view of life, and that the character reinforces Fleming's misogynistic view of women as they had been portrayed in the earlier Bond stories. Bold sees that Viv "underwrites Bond's sexual dominance over women" by having sex with him after he saves her. It is at this point in the novel that Fleming (as Viv) writes "All women love semi-rape. They love to be taken." The claim was one for which Fleming was criticised. The opinion of the journalist Ben Macintyre is that "Fleming was not seriously defending rape, or even semi-rape, but trying to shock by reinforcing the idea of Bond's essential cruelty. If so, he shocked far more than he intended, and he still does". Despite her rescue from near-rape and death, the author Nick Stone thinks that:

... at the end there is very little resolution for Vivienne, and next to no catharsis. The reader is left with the sense that she will only add the scars of her 'night of screaming terror' at the hands of the villains to those inflicted from her past.

The other characters in the novel are given less attention by Fleming. The historian Jeremy Black describes how Viv's second lover, Kurt, is a caricature of a German—a cruel racist with little capacity for love or affection—who forces her to have an abortion before ending their affair. According to Black, the two thugs, Sluggsy and Horror, are "comic-book villains with comic-book names". Their characters are not given the same status as other villains in Bond stories, but are second-rate professional killers which, the writer Matthew Parker thinks, makes them more believable in the story. Chancellor considers the novel's absence of a supervillain makes this one of Fleming's weaker works.

== Style ==
The Spy Who Loved Me is distinct from the other Bond novels in not being a spy story, and without that aspect "the full panoply of a Bond novel, animated by his presence, is absent", according to Black. Black sees the closest equivalent in the Bond canon is "Quantum of Solace", the 1960 short story about marital relations Fleming wrote in the style of W. Somerset Maugham, a writer he greatly admired. The absence of the spy element in The Spy Who Loved Me, and the concentration on Viv's early life, ensures the novel is the closest Fleming gets to kitchen sink realism in the Bond canon, as well as being the most sexually explicit of all of Fleming's novels.

Benson analyses Fleming's writing style and identifies what he describes as the "Fleming Sweep": a stylistic point that sweeps the reader from one chapter to another using narrative hooks at the end of chapters to heighten tension and pull the reader into the next: Benson considers that the Sweep in The Spy Who Loved Me was still present, although the manuscript is ostensibly written by Viv.

The literary analyst LeRoy L. Panek observes that The Spy Who Loved Me is a love story; in this, the novel "simply codifies a number of tendencies present in all ... [Fleming's] fiction". Panek argues that there are strong elements of romance in Casino Royale, Diamonds are Forever, Goldfinger, Thunderball and Dr. No. When analysed from the romantic viewpoint, the threat of Viv's rape from the two gangsters is held in counterpoint to the consensual sex between her and Bond.

== Themes ==
Bold sees Bond as a deus ex machina when he appears in the novel. As with several other Bond stories, the concept of Bond as Saint George against the dragon underlies the storyline to The Spy Who Loved Me, with Bond rescuing the maiden from imminent danger; (Note: Other novels in the series to use the same motif are Moonraker, From Russia, with Love, Goldfinger and You Only Live Twice. Benson considers the motif appears in all the novels.) Viv refers to Bond's appearance directly connecting Bond to the medieval legend:

Apart from the excitement of his looks, his authority, his maleness, he had come from nowhere, like the prince in the fairy tales, and he had saved me from the dragon. But for him, I would now be dead, after suffering God knows what before. He could have changed the wheel on his car and gone off, or, when danger came, he could have saved his own skin. But he had fought for my life as if it had been his own. And then, when the dragon was dead, he had taken me as his reward.

The question of good and evil is raised in the novel, with the police captain warning Viv that there is no practical difference between good and bad in the murky world in which both Bond and organised crime operate. Benson notes that when Viv first saw Bond, she thought he was another of the gangsters. Black agrees, and also sees the misuse of power by those with dark motives in the novel, and the vulnerable being challenged and trapped by manipulative and powerful forces. Before the police officer's conversation with Viv, Bond also discusses with her the question of good and evil and says there was little value in his job and his way of life, concluding:

It's nothing but a complicated game, really. But then so's international politics, diplomacy—all the trappings of nationalism and the power complex that goes on between countries. Nobody will stop playing the game. It's like the hunting instinct.

== Publication and reception ==
=== Publication history ===
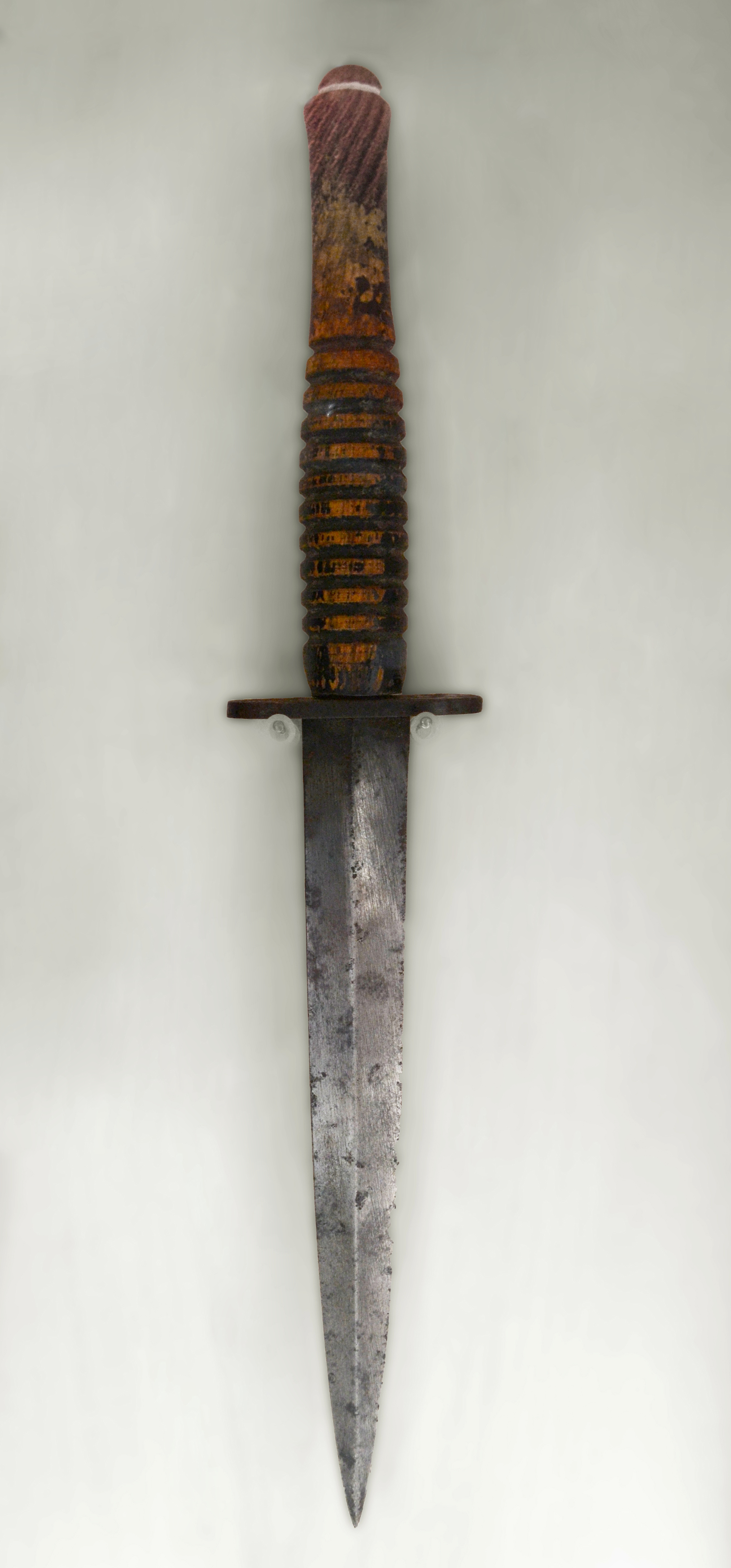
A Fairbairn–Sykes fighting knife, as depicted on the front cover of the first edition

The Spy Who Loved Me was released in the UK on 16 April 1962 as a hardcover edition by the publishers Jonathan Cape; it was 221 pages long. To continue the conceit that Viv had given the script to Fleming, she was listed as a co-author of the work. As he had with all of the previous first editions, the artist Richard Chopping undertook the cover art. He raised his fee from the 200 guineas (£210) he had charged for Thunderball to 250 guineas (£262.50). (Note: A guinea was originally a gold coin whose value was fixed at twenty-one shillings (£1.05). By this date the coin was obsolete and the term simply functioned as a label for that sum. According to calculations based on the Consumer Price Index measure of inflation, 200 guineas in 1962 is approximately £3,920 in 2025, while 250 guineas is £4,900, according to calculations based on Consumer Price Index measure of inflation.) The artwork included a Fairbairn–Sykes commando knife; Fleming borrowed one owned by his editor, Michael Howard at Jonathan Cape, as a model for Chopping. The Spy Who Loved Me was published in the US by Viking Books in April 1962; it was 211 pages long. In the US the story was also later published in Stag magazine, with the title changed to Motel Nymph.

Fleming later said of The Spy Who Loved Me that "the experiment has obviously gone very much awry". Because of the sexual content in the novel, it was banned in a number of countries, including in the Federation of Rhodesia and Nyasaland, South Africa and Australia.

The reception to the novel was so bad that Fleming requested there should be no reprints or paperback version of the book. For the British market no paperback version appeared until Pan Books published a copy in May 1967, after Fleming's death in 1964. This sold 517,000 copies before the end of the year, the best first-year sales of any of Fleming's works, with the exception of Thunderball, which sold 808,000 copies. Since its initial publication the book has been issued in numerous hardback and paperback editions, translated into several languages and, as at, has never been out of print. In 2023 Ian Fleming Publications—the company that administers Fleming's literary works—had the Bond series edited as part of a sensitivity review to remove or reword some racial or ethnic descriptors. The phrase "All women love semi-rape" from The Spy Who Loved Me was retained in the new release. The release of the bowdlerised series was on the 70th anniversary of Casino Royale, the first Bond novel.

=== Critical reception ===
Critics did not welcome Fleming's experiment with the Bond formula and the historian Black notes that The Spy Who Loved Me had the worst reception of all the Bond books. The Sunday Telegraph, for example, wrote "Oh dear, oh dear, oh dear! And to think of the books Mr Fleming once wrote!" while The Glasgow Herald thought Fleming's writing career was over: "His ability to invent a plot has deserted him almost entirely and he has had to substitute for a fast-moving story the sorry misadventures of an upper-class tramp, told in dreary detail." Writing in The Observer, Maurice Richardson described the tale as "a new and regrettable if not altogether unreadable variation", going on to hope that "this doesn't spell the total eclipse of Bond in a blaze of cornography". Richardson ended his piece by berating Fleming, asking "why can't this cunning author write up a bit instead of down?" The critic for The Times was not dismissive of Bond, describing him as "less a person than a cult" who is "ruthlessly, fashionably efficient in both love and war". Rather, the critic dismisses the experiment, writing that "the novel lacks Mr. Fleming's usual careful construction and must be written off as a disappointment." The reviewer John Fletcher thought that it was "as if Mickey Spillane had tried to gatecrash his way into the Romantic Novelists' Association".

Philip Stead, writing in The Times Literary Supplement considered the novel's plot to be "a morbid version of that of Beauty and the Beast". The review noted that once Bond arrives on the scene to find Viv threatened by the two thugs, he "solves [the problem] in his usual way. A great quantity of ammunition is expended, the zip-fastener is kept busy and the customary sexual consummation is associated with the kill." Vernon Scannell, as critic for The Listener, considered The Spy Who Loved Me to be "as silly as it is unpleasant". What aggrieved him most, however, was that it was "so unremittingly, so grindingly boring".

The critic for Time lamented the fact that "unaccountably lacking in The Spy Who Loved Me are the High-Stake Gambling Scene, the Meal-Ordering Scene, the Torture Scene, the battleship-grey Bentley and Blades Club". The critic also bemoaned the fact that "among the shocks and disappointments 1962 still has in store ... is the discovery that the cruel, handsome, scarred face of James Bond does not turn up until more than halfway through Ian Fleming's latest book". Anthony Boucher—a critic described by Fleming's biographer, John Pearson, as "throughout an avid anti-Bond and an anti-Fleming man"—meanwhile wrote that the "author has reached an unprecedented low".

Not all reviews were negative. Esther Howard wrote in The Spectator, "Surprisingly Ian Fleming's new book is a romantic one and, except for some early sex in England (rather well done, this) only just as nasty as is needed to show how absolutely thrilling it is for ... the narrator to be rescued from both death and worse – than by a he-man like James Bond. Myself, I like the Daphne du Maurier touch and prefer it this way but I doubt his real fans will."

== Adaptations ==
The previous Bond works were serialised in The Daily Express, but the newspaper turned down the opportunity to publish The Spy Who Loved Me as the story was too unlike the normal Bond books. The novel was adapted as a daily comic strip, written by Jim Lawrence and illustrated by Yaroslav Horak. It was published in The Daily Express from 18 December 1967 to 3 October 1968 and syndicated around the world. The Spy Who Loved Me was the last of Fleming's works to be adapted as a comic strip for the newspaper. The comic strip was reprinted in 2011 by Titan Books in the second volume of The James Bond Omnibus; the anthology also includes The Man with the Golden Gun, You Only Live Twice and Octopussy.

In 1977 the name The Spy Who Loved Me was used for the tenth film in the Eon Productions series and the third to star Roger Moore as Bond. Although Fleming had insisted that no film should contain anything of the plot of the novel—and the rights for the use of the name were granted on the basis that only the title was used—the steel-toothed character of Horror was included, renamed for the film as Jaws.

== See also ==
- List of James Bond novels and short stories
- Outline of James Bond

== Notes and references ==
=== Sources ===
==== Books ====
- Barnes, Alan; Hearn, Marcus (2001). Kiss Kiss Bang! Bang!: the Unofficial James Bond Film Companion. London: Batsford Books. ISBN 978-0-7134-8182-2.
- Bennett, Tony; Woollacott, Janet (2009). "The Moments of Bond". In Lindner, Christoph (ed.). The James Bond Phenomenon: a Critical Reader. Manchester: Manchester University Press. pp. 13–33. ISBN 978-0-7190-6541-5.
- Benson, Raymond (1988). The James Bond Bedside Companion. London: Boxtree Ltd. ISBN 978-1-85283-233-9.
- Besly, Edward (1997). Loose Change: A Guide to Common Coins and Medals. Cardiff: National Museum Wales. ISBN 978-0-7200-0444-1.
- Black, Jeremy (2005). The Politics of James Bond: From Fleming's Novel to the Big Screen. Lincoln, Nebraska: University of Nebraska Press. ISBN 978-0-8032-6240-9.
- Bold, Christine (2009). "'Under the Very Skirts of Britannia': Re-reading Women in the James Bond Novels". In Lindner, Christoph (ed.). The James Bond Phenomenon: A Critical Reader. Manchester: Manchester University Press. pp. 205–219. ISBN 978-0-7190-6541-5.
- Buckton, Oliver (2021). The World Is Not Enough: A Biography of Ian Fleming. Lanham, Maryland: Rowman & Littlefield. ISBN 978-1-5381-3858-8.
- Chancellor, Henry (2005). James Bond: The Man and His World. London: John Murray. ISBN 978-0-7195-6815-2.
- Chapman, James (2007). Licence to Thrill: A Cultural History of the James Bond Films. New York: I.B. Tauris. ISBN 978-1-8451-1515-9.
- Faulks, Sebastian; Fleming, Ian (2009). Devil May Care. London: Penguin Books. ISBN 978-0-14-103545-1.
- Fleming, Ian (1962). The Spy Who Loved Me. New York: The Viking Press. OCLC 6630093.
- Fleming, Ian; Gammidge, Henry; McLusky, John (1988). Octopussy. London: Titan Books. ISBN 1-85286-040-5.
- Fleming, Fergus (2015). The Man with the Golden Typewriter: Ian Fleming's James Bond Letters. New York: Bloomsbury. ISBN 978-1-6328-6489-5.
- Griswold, John (2006). Ian Fleming's James Bond: Annotations and Chronologies for Ian Fleming's Bond Stories. Bloomington, Indiana: AuthorHouse. ISBN 978-1-4259-3100-1.
- Lycett, Andrew (1996). Ian Fleming. London: Phoenix. ISBN 978-1-85799-783-5.
- Macintyre, Ben (2008a). For Your Eyes Only. London: Bloomsbury Publishing. ISBN 978-0-7475-9527-4.
- McLusky, John; Gammidge, Henry; Lawrence, Jim; Fleming, Ian; Horak, Yaroslav (2011). The James Bond Omnibus Vol. 2. London: Titan Books. ISBN 978-1-84856-432-9.
- Panek, LeRoy (1981). The Special Branch: The British Spy Novel, 1890–1980. Bowling Green, Ohio: Bowling Green University Popular Press. ISBN 978-0-87972-178-7.
- Parker, Matthew (2014). Goldeneye: Where Bond Was Born: Ian Fleming's Jamaica. London: Hutchinson. ISBN 978-0-0919-5410-9.
- Pearson, John (1967). The Life of Ian Fleming: Creator of James Bond. London: Pan Books. OCLC 60318176.
- Stone, Nick (2006). Introduction. The Spy Who Loved Me. By Fleming, Ian. London: Penguin Books. ISBN 978-0-141-02822-4.

==== Journals and magazines ====
- Howard, Esther (1 June 1962). "The Spy Who Loved Me". The Spectator. London. p. 728.
- "Books: Of Human Bondage". Time. 13 April 1962. Archived from the original on 19 February 2011.
- Scannell, Vernon (3 May 1962). "New Novels". The Listener.
- Sternberg, Meir (Spring 1983). "Knight Meets Dragon in the James Bond Saga: Realism and Reality-Models". Style. 17 (2). University Park, Pennsylvania: Penn State University Press: 142–180. JSTOR 42945465.

==== News ====
- "Books – Authors". The New York Times. 29 March 1962. p. 30. (subscription required)
- "James Bond Book is Banned in Australia". Coventry Evening Telegraph. 19 August 1965. p. 14.
- Macintyre, Ben (25 January 2008b). "Fleming's Reflection on the Limitations of Love". The Times. p. 13.
- "New Fiction". The Times. 19 April 1962. p. 15.
- "Rhodesians Ban Fleming Novel". The Daily Telegraph. 14 April 1962. p. 9.
- Richardson, Maurice (15 April 1962). "Crime Ration". The Observer. p. 28.
- Simpson, Craig (25 February 2023). "James Bond Books Edited to Remove Racist References". The Sunday Telegraph.
- "South Africa Bans 'Spy Who Loved Me'". Omaha World-Herald. 7 August 1965. p. 21.
- Stead, Philip John (20 April 1962). "Bond's New Girl". The Times Literary Supplement. p. 261.

==== Websites ====
- Clark, Gregory (2023). "The Annual RPI and Average Earnings for Britain, 1209 to Present (New Series)". MeasuringWorth. Archived from the original on 1 April 2023.
- "Ian Fleming's James Bond Titles". Ian Fleming Publications. Archived from the original on 10 August 2015.
- Lycett, Andrew (2017). "Fleming, Ian Lancaster (1908–1964)". Oxford Dictionary of National Biography (online ed.). Oxford University Press. doi:10.1093/ref:odnb/33168. (Subscription, Wikipedia Library access or UK public library membership required.)
- Sutton, Mike (2014). "Spy Who Loved Me, The (1977)". BFI Screenonline. British Film Institute. Archived from the original on 7 September 2009.
- "The Spy Who Loved Me". WorldCat.
