= Octopussy and The Living Daylights =

1966 short story collection by Ian Fleming

- First edition cover, published by Jonathan Cape
- Author: Ian Fleming
- Cover artist: Richard Chopping (Jonathan Cape ed.)
- Language: English
- Series: James Bond
- Genre: Spy fiction
- Publisher: Jonathan Cape
- Publication date: 23 June 1966
- Publication place: United Kingdom
- Media type: Print (hardback and paperback)
- Pages: 94 (first edition)
- Preceded by: The Man with the Golden Gun

Octopussy and The Living Daylights (sometimes published as Octopussy) is the fourteenth and final James Bond book written by Ian Fleming. The book is a collection of short stories published in the United Kingdom by Jonathan Cape on 23 June 1966, after Fleming's death in August 1964.

The book originally contained two stories, "Octopussy" and "The Living Daylights"; subsequent editions also included "The Property of a Lady" and then "007 in New York". The stories first appeared in different publications: "Octopussy" was serialised in the Daily Express in October 1965; "The Living Daylights" appeared in The Sunday Times colour supplement on 4 February 1962; "The Property of a Lady" was commissioned by Sotheby's for the 1963 edition of their journal, The Ivory Hammer; and "007 in New York" appeared in the New York Herald Tribune in October 1963.

Many of the elements of the stories come from Fleming's own interests and experiences, including climbing in Kitzbühel, Austria, wartime commando deeds and the sea-life of Jamaica. He used the names of friends and acquaintances for characters within the stories and also used a recipe for scrambled eggs given to him by a friend.

The two original stories, "Octopussy" and "The Living Daylights", were adapted for publication in comic strip format in the Daily Express in 1966–1967. Elements from the stories have also been used in the Eon Productions Bond films. Octopussy, starring Roger Moore as James Bond, was released in 1983 as the thirteenth film in the series and Fleming's story provided the background for the character Octopussy; "The Property of a Lady" was closely adapted for an auction sequence in the film. The Living Daylights, released in 1987, is the fifteenth Bond film produced by Eon and stars Timothy Dalton in his first appearance as Bond. "007 in New York" provided character and plot elements for the first two films starring Daniel Craig as Bond, Casino Royale and Quantum of Solace.

== Plots ==
=== "Octopussy" ===
The Secret Service operative James Bond travels to Jamaica to interview Major Dexter Smythe, a former Royal Marine officer implicated in the murder of Hannes Oberhauser, an Austrian mountain guide, and the theft of a cache of Nazi gold estimated to be £40,000–50,000. (Note: According to calculations based on the Consumer Price Index measure of inflation, £40,000–50,000 in 1945 is approximately £1,493,000 to 1,866,000 in 2025.) Bond appears only briefly in this story, which is mostly told from the perspective of Smythe. Smythe remained in Kitzbühel, Austria, after the Second World War, found the gold with the help of Oberhauser and killed him. Bond was put on the case after the guide's body fell out of a glacier over fifteen years after the murder; Oberhauser had been Bond's skiing instructor and, as Bond describes it, "something of a father to me at a time when I happened to need one".

Bond chooses not to take Smythe into custody immediately, but leaves him to contemplate his options: suicide or a court martial. While hunting for a scorpion fish to feed Octopussy—an octopus that lives offshore of his beach—Smythe is stung by the fish. When he goes to feed Octopussy, he is dragged underwater by it as the poison sets in. Bond views the death as a suicide, but classifies it as an accidental drowning to spare Smythe's reputation.

=== "The Living Daylights" ===
Bond is assigned sniper duty to help a British agent—code number 272—escape from East Berlin. Bond's duty is to safeguard his crossing into West Berlin by eliminating a top KGB assassin codenamed "Trigger", who has been dispatched to kill 272. Bond takes up a position on the western edge of the border, in a flat overlooking the no man's land that 272 will have to cross. On each of three nights, he sees a female orchestra arrive for rehearsal and leave, and he takes particular notice of a beautiful blonde cellist. Once 272 starts to cross the border, Bond sees Trigger get in position to kill him and he realises that she is the cellist. He adjusts his aim at the last moment and shoots her weapon instead of killing her, allowing 272 to reach safety.

=== "The Property of a Lady" ===
The Secret Service learns that Maria Freudenstein, one of their employees known to be a double agent working for the Soviet Union, has just received a valuable item of jewellery crafted by Peter Carl Fabergé and is planning to auction it at Sotheby's. Bond suspects that the resident director of the KGB in London will attend the auction and underbid for the item to drive the price up to the value needed to pay Freudenstein for her services. Bond attends the auction, spots the man, and leaves to make arrangements for his expulsion from London as persona non grata.

=== "007 in New York" ===
A brief tale in which Bond muses about New York. He is on a quick mission to the city to warn a female ex-employee of MI6 that her new boyfriend is a KGB agent. It includes reference to Solange, a young lady of Bond's intimate acquaintance who works in Abercrombie's; it also includes Fleming's recipe for "scrambled eggs 'James Bond'". (Note: The recipe is for four people and requires 12 fresh eggs, salt, pepper and 5–6 oz (140–170 g) of fresh butter. Break the eggs into a bowl. Beat thoroughly with a fork and season well. In a small copper (or heavy-bottomed saucepan) melt four oz. of the butter. When melted, pour in the eggs and cook over a very low heat, whisking continuously with a small egg whisk. While the eggs are slightly more moist than you would wish for eating, remove pan from heat, add rest of butter and continue whisking for half a minute, while adding the finely chopped chives or fines herbes. Serve on hot buttered toast in individual copper dishes (for appearance only) with pink champagne (Taittinger) and low music.)

== Background and writing history ==
By the time Fleming died of a heart attack on 12 August 1964, he had published eleven novels and one short story collection in his James Bond series. Eight months later his twelfth and final novel, The Man with the Golden Gun, was published. (Note: The books were Casino Royale (1953), Live and Let Die (1954), Moonraker (1955), Diamonds Are Forever (1956), From Russia, with Love (1957), Dr. No (1958), Goldfinger (1959), Thunderball (1961), The Spy Who Loved Me (1962), On Her Majesty's Secret Service (1963) and You Only Live Twice (1964); the short story collection For Your Eyes Only, was published in 1960.) The rights to his works were held by the Fleming family-owned Glidrose Productions (now Ian Fleming Publications) and the company decided that two short stories, "Octopussy" and "The Living Daylights", would be published in 1966.

In July 1962 Fleming was in the midst of marital troubles with his wife, Ann. While in New York he sent her a telegram saying that he needed "time to rest and reflect on our future which at present looks intolerable", and travelled to his Goldeneye estate in Jamaica. While there, he wrote "Octopussy". The story has Bond as catalyst for a narrative told in flashback, rather than as the main character for action; as such, it is told in the manner of "Quantum of Solace", a short story first published in 1959 and then included in the collection For Your Eyes Only. "Octopussy" was serialised in the Daily Express from 4–8 October 1965.

The Sunday Times decided to launch a colour magazine, to start on 4 February 1962, and asked Fleming—one of their columnists—to write an article for it. He wrote a piece titled "The Guns of James Bond", but this was rejected as being too long and specialised for the target audience; accordingly, he wrote the story of Bond as a sniper. As background research to the story, he corresponded with Captain E. K. Le Mesurier, the secretary of the British National Rifle Association at Bisley for information, and to correct some of the more specialist areas of knowledge required for sniper shooting. Fleming originally titled the story "Trigger Finger", although it was published under the title "The Living Daylights". It was also published in the June 1962 issue of the American magazine Argosy under the name "Berlin Escape". For The Sunday Times, Fleming had commissioned Graham Sutherland to undertake the artwork to accompany the piece, at a cost of 100 guineas, although the artwork was not used in the published edition. (Note: A guinea was originally a gold coin whose value was fixed at twenty-one shillings (£1.05). By this date the coin was obsolete and the term simply functioned as a label for that sum. According to calculations based on the Consumer Price Index measure of inflation, 100 guineas in 1962 is approximately £1,960 in 2025.)

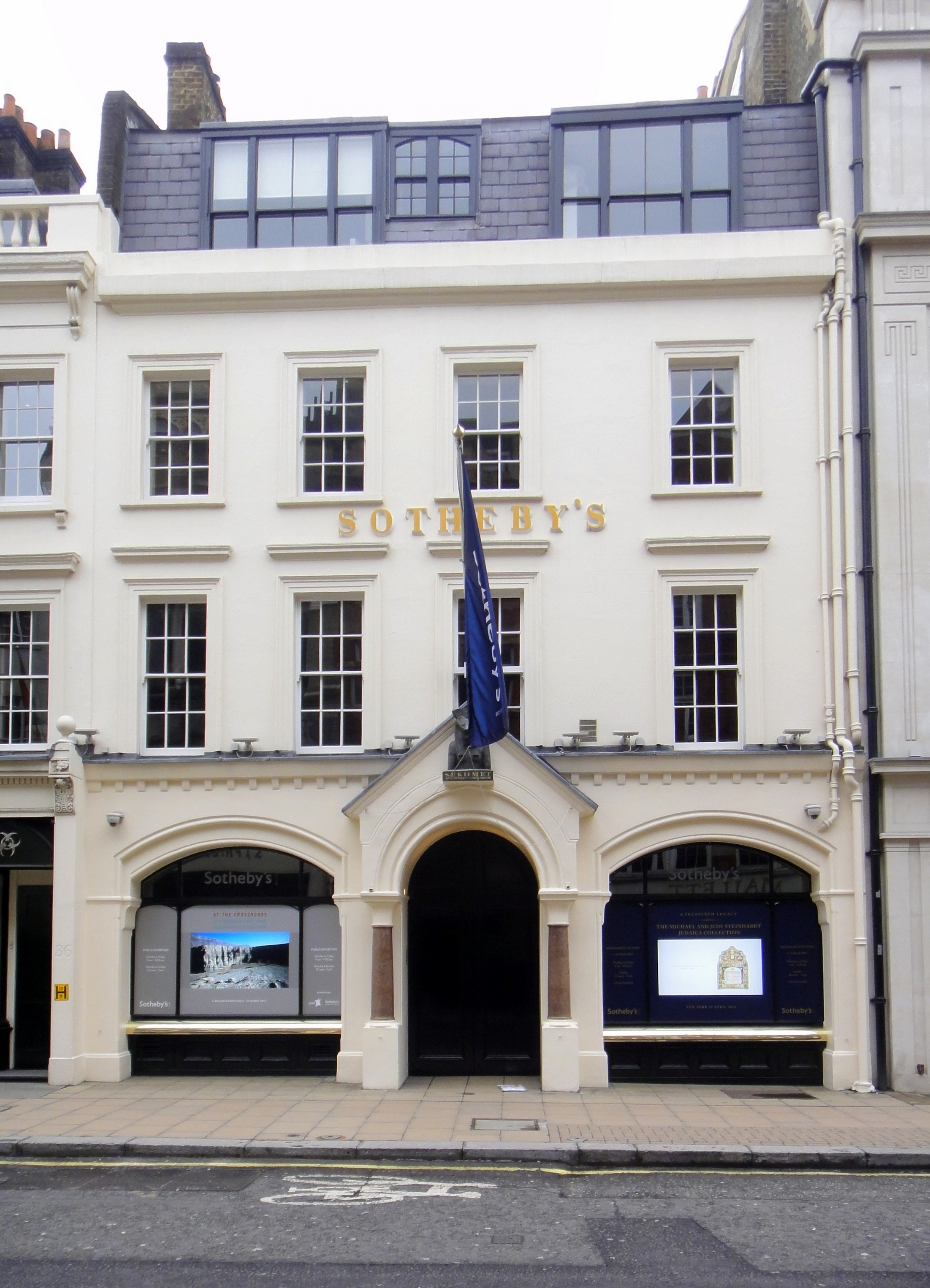
The Sotheby's auction house on New Bond Street, London

"Property of a Lady", which was written in early 1963, was commissioned by Sotheby's for use in their annual journal, The Ivory Hammer, and published in November 1963. The Sotheby's chairman Peter Wilson is mentioned by name in the story. Fleming was so unhappy with the final piece, he wrote to Wilson and refused payment for something he considered so lacklustre. Fleming's original names for the piece were "The Diamond Egg" and "The Fabulous Pay-Off".

In 1959 Fleming was commissioned by The Sunday Times to travel around the world and write a series of articles based on world cities, the material for which later was collected into a book entitled Thrilling Cities. Although he liked New York, his experiences on the trip soured his view of the city, and he wrote: "Go into the first drugstore, ask your way from a passer-by, and the indifference and harshness of the New Yorker cuts the old affection for the city out of your body as sharply as a surgeon's knife." Because of his harshness toward the city, his American publishers asked him to modify the chapter; Fleming refused. By way of recompense, in August 1963 he wrote a short story from the point of view of Bond. "007 in New York" was originally titled "Reflections in a Carey Cadillac". The story was first published in the New York Herald Tribune in October 1963 as "Agent 007 in New York", but was subsequently renamed as "007 in New York" for the 1964 US editions of Thrilling Cities.

Although Fleming did not date the events within his novels, John Griswold and Henry Chancellor—both of whom wrote books for Ian Fleming Publications—have identified timelines based on episodes and situations within the novel series as a whole. Chancellor puts the events of "The Living Daylights" in October 1959; "Octopussy" in 1960; "007 in New York" in early 1961; and "The Property of a Lady" in June 1961. Griswold differs and considers "Octopussy" to have taken place in July 1960; "The Living Daylights" at the end of September to the beginning of October 1960; "The Property of a Lady" in June 1961; and "007 in New York" at the end of September 1961.

== Development ==
=== Inspirations ===
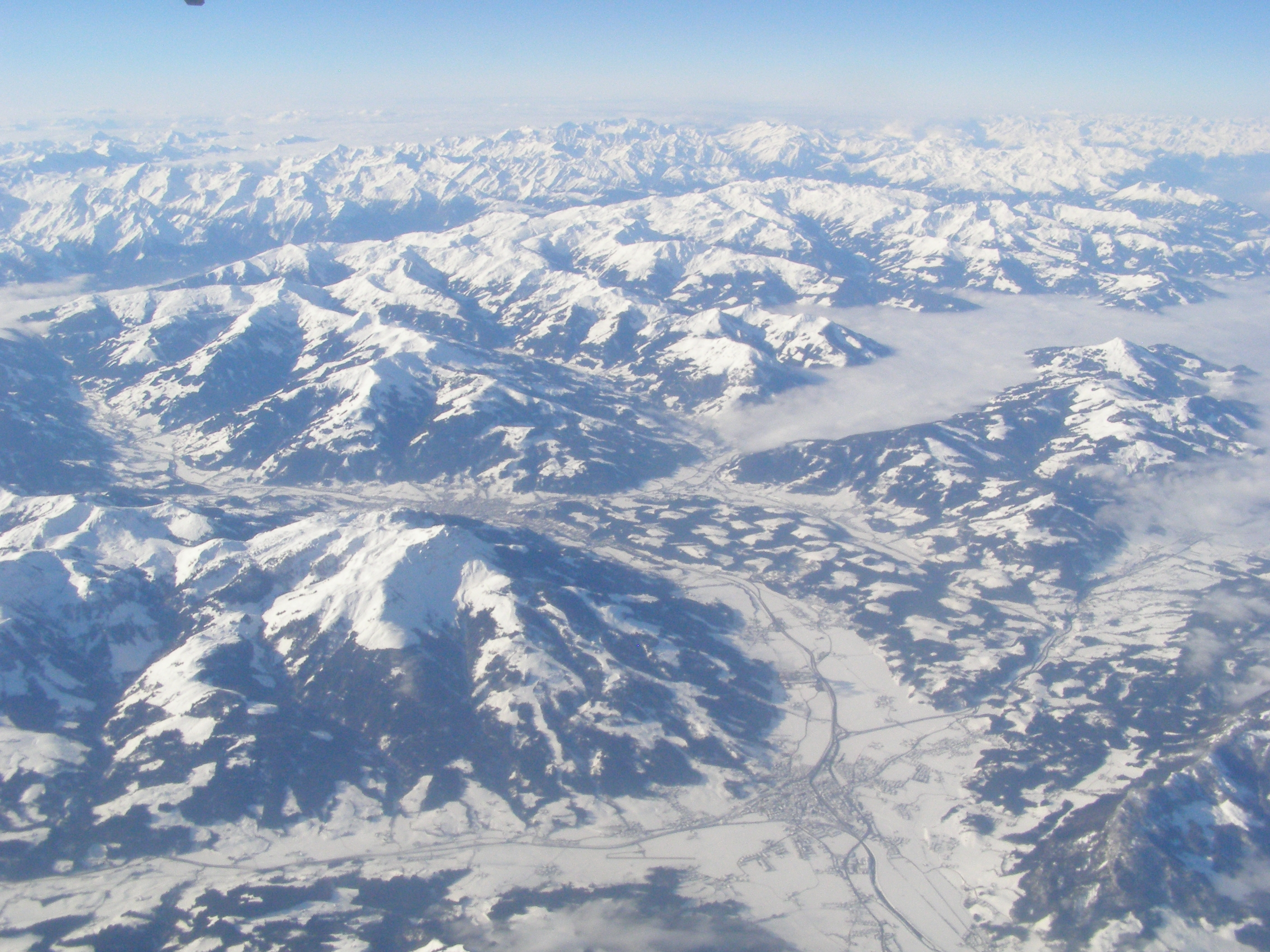
The Kitzbühel Alps, with Kitzbühel at the centre left of the image

Fleming's biographer Andrew Lycett and Chancellor consider that much of the background of "Octopussy" is directly from Fleming's own interests and experiences, including wartime commando deeds, climbing in Kitzbühel, hidden gold and the sea-life of Jamaica. Fleming had often hiked and skied in Kitzbühel in the late 1920s, while he was attending a small private school to study for entry into the Foreign Office. He knew the area well and his experiences were used as the part of the story where Smythe hunted for the gold. Fleming had an interest in octopuses and observed one—which he named "Pussy"—regularly while diving at his beach at Goldeneye; he wrote an article about the animal for The Sunday Times in 1957, "My Friend the Octopus". One of Fleming's neighbours in Jamaica, and later his lover, was the heiress Blanche Blackwell. She had given Fleming a coracle, which he named Octopussy; he then used the name for the story. Smythe's wartime unit, the "Miscellaneous Objectives Bureau", was a fictional version of Fleming's 30 AU unit. Fleming had a long-standing interest in hidden gold and was involved in the commissioning of an article for The Sunday Times about Nazi gold that had supposedly been dumped in Lake Toplitz, Austria.

Part of the background to the plot of "The Living Daylights" included using the noise of the orchestra to cover the crossing over no man's land. This was inspired by Pat Reid's escape from Colditz prisoner-of-war camp, during which two escapees ran across a courtyard under the cover of the noise from an orchestra. The conductor of the Colditz orchestra was Douglas Bader, who played golf with Fleming on several occasions. The assassin, Trigger, was partly based on Amaryllis, Fleming's half-sister. She was a concert cellist with blonde hair, and Fleming managed to get a passing reference to her in the story, saying: "Of course Suggia had managed to look elegant, as did that girl Amaryllis somebody." Fleming used the surname of one of his acquaintances—the wartime head of MI6, Sir Stewart Menzies—for Corporal Menzies, who aids Bond during his rifle practice at the start of the story.

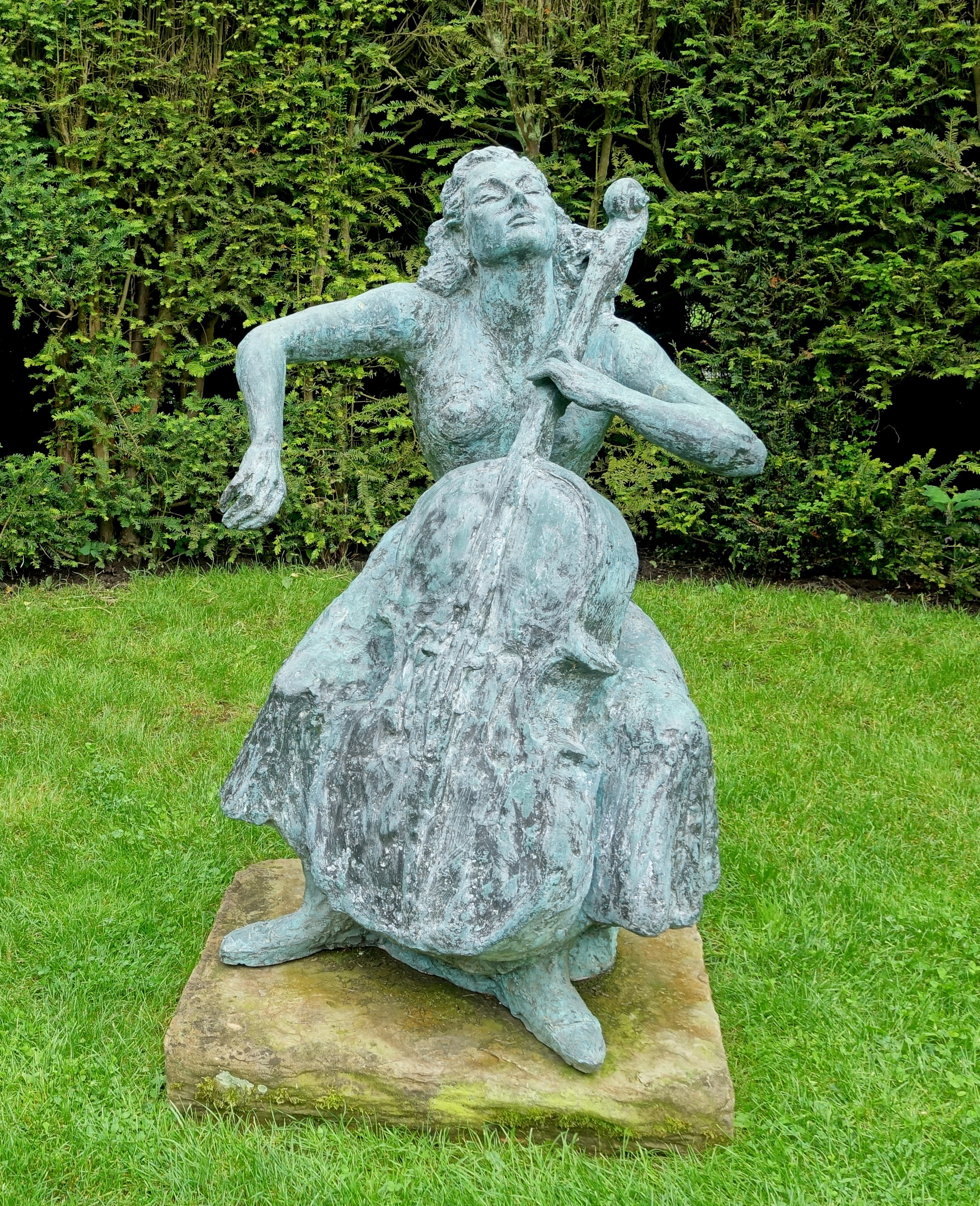
Statue of Fleming's half-sister, Amaryllis

Fleming was a lover of scrambled eggs and included in "007 in New York" a recipe for the dish. This originally came from May Maxwell, the housekeeper of Fleming's friend Ivar Bryce. Fleming also used her name for Bond's own housekeeper, May.

=== Characters ===
According to Matthew Parker and Jon Gilbert, respectively a biographer and a bibliographer of Fleming, Smythe is a semi-autobiographical portrayal of Fleming, although Chancellor thinks it likely that the character "is so well drawn that he sounds like a neighbour or friend". Both Parker and Gilbert highlight that both Fleming and Smythe were ex-military men, previously fit and active, but now suffering from heart problems (including suffering a heart attack); lived on a Jamaican beach, where they drank and smoked heavily; and had been involved in capturing German units at the war's end. The sociologist Anthony Synnott, in his examination of aesthetics in the Bond books, observes that Smythe is one of only two British villains in the canon, along with Vesper Lynd (from the 1953 novel Casino Royale); both characters die at the end of their stories.

Raymond Benson, the author of the continuation Bond novels, wrote that in "The Living Daylights", Bond's thoughts on killing are examined once again. The story shows that although Bond did not like doing it, he considered that he must kill as part of his duty to complete an assignment. Once the mission is completed, Bond having deliberately wounded but not killed the assassin, he demonstrates an attitude of complacency and shrugs off his colleague's complaints about the incident. The historian Jeremy Black sees Bond's colleague, the officious Captain Sender, as the antithesis of Bond and an echo of Colonel Schreiber, the head of security at Supreme Headquarters Allied Powers Europe, who appeared in the 1960 short story "From a View to a Kill".

The lady referred to in the title of "Property of a Lady" was Maria von Freudenstein, a traitor within the Secret Service who thought she was sending high-grade intelligence to the KGB, but was unknowingly passing low-level information and some misinformation instead. She is described as

an unattractive girl with a pale, rather pimply skin, black hair and a vaguely unwashed appearance. Such a girl would be unloved, make few friends, have chips on her shoulder ... Perhaps her only pleasure in life was the triumphant secret she harboured in that flattish bosom.

Synnott sees this as another example of Fleming's use of using physical unattractiveness as a shorthand method of indicating evil or criminality. Black observes that the suggestion that her ugliness has caused her treachery means there is no place for ideology in her actions. Black sees that Fleming's description of Piotr Malinowski, the KGB agent at the auction, also shows the same pattern of equating unattractive physical features with criminality. The KGB man is described thus:

The hair grew low down on the back of the man's rather squat neck and the lobes of his ears were pinched in close to his head. He had a slight hump, perhaps only a bone deformation, high up on his back.

== Style ==
Within the James Bond series, Benson identifies what he described as the "Fleming Sweep", the use of "hooks" at the end of chapters to heighten tension and pull the reader into the next. In "Octopussy" he sees the hooks being used to keep the pace of the story moving, despite there being no passages of action. The story, which he considers a morality tale, uses the flashback technique that Fleming liked.

The Fleming Sweep is also present in "The Living Daylights", which Benson considers "compressed and intensely written". He considers that Fleming's rich use of detail makes some scenes vivid; these are identified as scenes of the range at Bisley, Berlin and the attempted shooting of the British agent.

== Release and reception ==
=== Publication history ===
Octopussy and The Living Daylights was published in Britain on 23 June 1966 by Jonathan Cape and cost 10s.6d. (Note: According to calculations based on the Consumer Price Index measure of inflation, 10 shillings 6 pence in 1966 is approximately equivalent to £10 in 2025.) The hardback edition of the book contained only the two stories mentioned in the title. As he had done for many of Fleming's other Bond novels, the artist Richard Chopping provided the cover art; his fee rose from 300 to 350 guineas. (Note: According to calculations based on the Consumer Price Index measure of inflation, 350 guineas in 1966 is approximately £5,980 in 2025.) The first edition had a print run of approximately 45,000. It sold slowly and the first edition was still being sold when the UK decimalised its currency in February 1971, which led to Jonathan Cape putting stickers over the pre-decimal price. The book was published in the US in mid-1966 by New American Library with illustrations from Paul Bacon.

Octopussy and The Living Daylights was published in paperback form in the UK by Pan Books in July 1967; "The Property of a Lady" was also added, although the book's title remained unchanged. The book sold 79,000 copies in the UK that year and 362,000 in 1968; overseas sales for 1967 were more than 76,000. By 2002 "007 in New York" had been added to the book by Viking Press.

=== Reviews ===
The poet Philip Larkin wrote in The Spectator that although he found the two stories of the first edition to be "full of shading and nuance", he was "not surprised that Fleming preferred to write novels. James Bond, unlike Sherlock Holmes, does not fit snugly into the short-story length: there is something grandiose and intercontinental about his adventures that require elbow room and such examples of the form as we have tend to be eccentric or muted. These are no exception." The critic for The Times Literary Supplement thought the stories were predictable, but praised the descriptions of ballistics and sea-life. Writing in The Listener, the writer Anthony Burgess thought that "fascinated poring on things ... remind us that the stuff of the anti-novel needn't necessarily spring from a thought-out aesthetic", going on to note that "it is the mastery of the world that gives Fleming his peculiar literary niche".

Some reviewers wrote about the book in light of the Bond films or other similar works: in Tatler, Carole d'Albiac described the stories as "short, throwaway and inimitable", and considered "that these morsels only serve to emphasise how miserably many imitators fail, and how the films don't quite catch the flavour"; the critic from The Observer felt that "Both are as readable as one might expect, though some way from Fleming's best form. Perhaps the spate of inferior imitations may make them seem rather better than they really are." Other critics reviewed the stories in the light of Fleming's death, including George Dowson of the Manchester Evening News, who wrote "Both are little gems in the best Bond tradition and illustrate just how much we lost with the death of Ian Fleming". Burgess finished his review by stating "I admired all the Bond books and I'm sorry there'll be no more. A sad farewell to Fleming".

== Adaptations and reprints ==
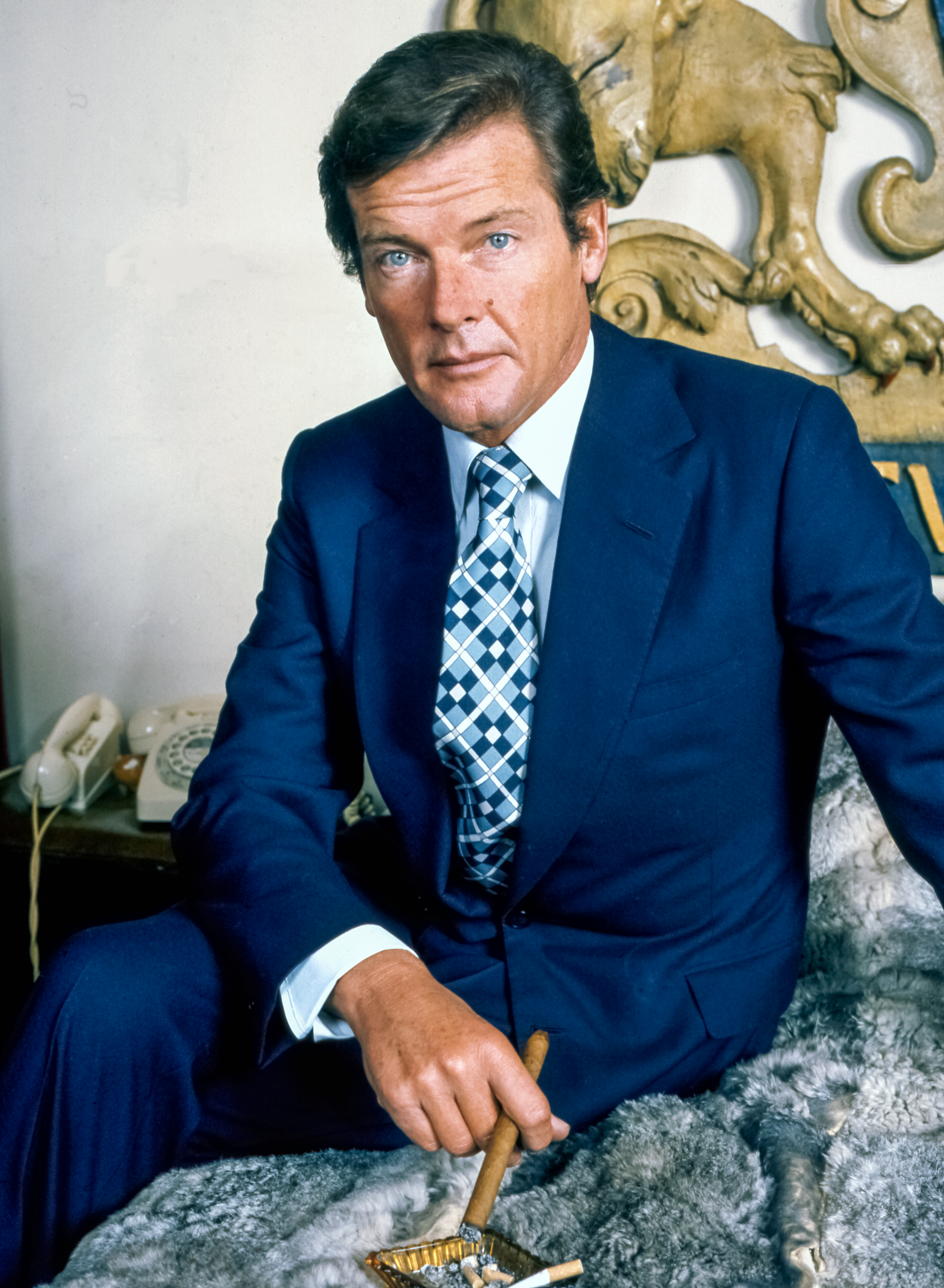
Roger Moore (pictured in 1973), played Bond in the 1983 film Octopussy.

"Property of a Lady" was reprinted in Playboy in January 1964; "Octopussy" was serialised in the March and April 1966 editions of the magazine. The artist Barry Geller used Sean Connery's likeness for the illustrations accompanying "Octopussy". Two of the short stories were adapted for publication in comic strip format, which were published daily in the Daily Express and syndicated worldwide. The Living Daylights ran from 12 September to 12 November 1966, adapted by Jim Lawrence and illustrated by Yaroslav Horak; the same pair also worked on Octopussy, which ran from 14 November 1966 to 27 May 1967. The story lines for the strips were altered from the original Fleming version to ensure that they contained a glamorous reason for being Bond involved and to include Bond in action. The strips were reprinted by Titan Books in 1988 and then again in The James Bond Omnibus Vol. 2, published in 2011.

In 1983 Eon Productions loosely adapted elements of two of the stories, "Octopussy" and "The Property of a Lady", for the thirteenth film in their Bond series, starring Roger Moore as Bond. "Octopussy" provided the title of the film and the background for the character Octopussy, the daughter of a character Bond had allowed to commit suicide rather than face the shame of arrest and imprisonment. The film also used the plot device of the auctioning of a Fabergé egg at Sotheby's from "The Property of a Lady"; as with the story the auction item was described as being the same "property of a lady". In 1987 Eon used the plot of "The Living Daylights", almost unchanged, for a section of their 1987 film of the same name. The film starred Timothy Dalton in his first role as Bond, and the character of Trigger became that of the cello player Kara Milovy. Eon used the name Solange—from "007 in New York"—for a character in the 2006 film Casino Royale, and in the 2008 film Quantum of Solace, the epilogue uses the premise from "007 in New York"—that of Bond warning a female intelligence agent that her boyfriend is an enemy agent. The character of Oberhauser was used in the 2015 film Spectre; he was adapted to be the father of Ernst Stavro Blofeld, the leader of the criminal organisation Spectre and the former legal guardian of Bond in his youth.

== See also ==
- Outline of James Bond – Fictional MI6 secret agent 007

== Notes and references ==
=== Sources ===
==== Books ====
- Barnes, Alan; Hearn, Marcus (2001). Kiss Kiss Bang! Bang!: The Unofficial James Bond Film Companion. London: Batsford Books. ISBN 978-0-7134-8645-2.
- Bennett, Tony; Woollacott, Janet (2009). "The Moments of Bond". In Lindner, Christoph (ed.). The James Bond Phenomenon: A Critical Reader. Manchester: Manchester University Press. ISBN 978-0-7190-6541-5.
- Benson, Raymond (1988). The James Bond Bedside Companion. London: Boxtree Ltd. ISBN 978-1-8528-3233-9.
- Besly, Edward (1997). Loose Change: A Guide to Common Coins and Medals. Cardiff: National Museum Wales. ISBN 978-0-7200-0444-1.
- Black, Jeremy (2005). The Politics of James Bond: From Fleming's Novel to the Big Screen. Lincoln, Nebraska: University of Nebraska Press. ISBN 978-0-8032-6240-9.
- Chancellor, Henry (2005). James Bond: The Man and His World. London: John Murray. ISBN 978-0-7195-6815-2.
- DelFattore, Joan (1989). "Ian Fleming". In Benstock, Bernard; Staley, Thomas (eds.). British Mystery and Thriller Writers Since 1940. Detroit: Gale Research. ISBN 978-0-7876-3072-0.
- Fleming, Fergus (2015). The Man with the Golden Typewriter: Ian Fleming's James Bond Letters. New York: Bloomsbury. ISBN 978-1-6328-6489-5.
- Fleming, Ian (1964). Thrilling Cities. London: The Reprint Society. OCLC 3260418.
- Fleming, Ian (2002). Octopussy and The Living Daylights. London: Penguin Books. ISBN 978-0-1411-8874-4.
- Fleming, Ian; Gammidge, Henry; McLusky, John (1988). Octopussy. London: Titan Books. ISBN 1-8528-6040-5.
- Gant, Richard (1966). Ian Fleming: The Man with the Golden Pen. London: Mayflower-Dell Books. OCLC 3191402.
- Gilbert, Jon (2012). Ian Fleming: The Bibliography. London: Queen Anne Press. ISBN 978-0-9558-1897-4.
- Griswold, John (2006). Ian Fleming's James Bond: Annotations and Chronologies for Ian Fleming's Bond Stories. Bloomington, Indiana: AuthorHouse. ISBN 978-1-4259-3100-1.
- Hines, Claire (2018). The Playboy and James Bond: 007, Ian Fleming and Playboy Magazine. Manchester: Manchester University Press. ISBN 978-0-7190-8226-9.
- Lycett, Andrew (1996). Ian Fleming. London: Phoenix. ISBN 978-1-8579-9783-5.
- Macintyre, Ben (2008). For Your Eyes Only. London: Bloomsbury Publishing. ISBN 978-0-7475-9527-4.
- McLusky, John; Gammidge, Henry; Lawrence, Jim; Fleming, Ian; Horak, Yaroslav (2011). The James Bond Omnibus Vol. 2. London: Titan Books. ISBN 978-1-8485-6432-9.
- Parker, Matthew (2014). Goldeneye. London: Hutchinson. ISBN 978-0-0919-5410-9.
- Smith, Jim; Lavington, Stephen (2002). Bond Films. London: Virgin Books. ISBN 978-0-7535-0709-4.
- Turner, Jon Lys (2016). The Visitors' Book: In Francis Bacon's Shadow: The Lives of Richard Chopping and Denis Wirth-Miller (Kindle ed.). London: Constable. ISBN 978-1-4721-2168-4.

==== Journals and magazines ====
- Burgess, Anthony (14 July 1966). "New Fiction". The Listener.
- d'Albiac, Carole (2 July 1966). "New Books". The Tatler. p. 45.
- Fleming, Ian (4 February 1962). "The Living Daylights". The Sunday Times Colour Section. p. 23.
- Larkin, Philip (8 July 1966). "Bond's Last Case". The Spectator. pp. 50, 52.
- "Sales Report from Pan". The Bookseller. 9 December 1967. p. 2668.
- Synnott, Anthony (Spring 1990). "The Beauty Mystique: Ethics and Aesthetics in the Bond Genre". International Journal of Politics, Culture, and Society. 3 (3): 407–26. doi:10.1007/BF01384969. JSTOR 20006960. S2CID 143938867.

==== News ====
- Dowson, George (1 October 1966). "This Little Bond will make you Sit Up". Manchester Evening News. p. 2.
- "Fiction in Brief". The Observer. 3 July 1966. p. 22.
- "Obituary: Mr Ian Fleming". The Times. 13 August 1964. p. 12.

==== Websites ====
- Clark, Gregory (2023). "The Annual RPI and Average Earnings for Britain, 1209 to Present (New Series)". MeasuringWorth. Archived from the original on 1 April 2023.
- Fischer, Russ (27 March 2015). "Spectre Trailer". Slashfilm. Archived from the original on 22 December 2020.
- "Ian Fleming's James Bond Titles". Ian Fleming Publications. Archived from the original on 10 August 2015.
- "Octopussy & The Living Daylights". British Library. Archived from the original on 27 November 2024.
- "Quantum of Solace (2008)". Mutant Reviewers. 2 June 2010.
- Williams, Owen (6 December 2019). "James Bond: From Page To Screen". Empire.
