= Yaroslav Horak =

Australian comics artist (1927–2020)

- Born: Yaroslaph Horak; 12 June 1927 Harbin, Manchuria, Republic of China
- Died: 24 November 2020 (aged 93) Lindfield, Australia
- Area: artist
- Pseudonym: Larry Horak
- Notable works: James Bond

Yaroslav Horak (12 June 1927 – 24 November 2020) was an Australian illustrator and comics artist, of ethnic Czech-Russian origin, best known for his work on the newspaper comic strip James Bond.

== Biography ==
A panel of James Bond as illustrated by Horak

Yaroslaph (Yaroslav) Horak was born on 12 June 1927 in Harbin, China, the son and second child of Joseph Horak, a Czech-born engineer, and Russian mother, Zanidia. He and his older sister, Josephia (Josephine), grew up in the suburb of Novyi Gorod and attended the YMCA International School. In 1939, his family migrated to Sydney, Australia following the Japanese invasion of Manchuria and prior to World War II. They settled in Centennial Park, where he attended St Mary's Cathedral College and subsequently undertook evening art classes at the Sydney Technical College.

He began his career as a portrait painter but switched to illustration for the larger Australian magazine publishers. In 1948 Horak's first accepted comic strips were for Rick Davis (a detective adventure) and The Skyman (a mysterious costumed flyer) in 1948. He then moved to Syd Nicholls' Publications where he worked on Ray Thorpe (an adventure series) and Ripon – the Man from Outer Space (sci-fi). Horak also did comic strips for a number of other Sydney publishers, before he moved to Melbourne where he drew Brenda Starr for Atlas Publications. In 1954 he created The Mask – The Man of Many Faces and an adaptation of the popular children's TV program Captain Fortune for Fairfax publications The Sun-Herald between 1957–1962 and Mike Steele – Desert Rider for Woman’s Day magazine.

Horak then moved to England in 1962, where he also drew adventure stories for D. C. Thomson of Scotland, the scripts being supplied by others. He was the second artist, taking over from John McLusky, for the Daily Express strip James Bond from 1966 to 1977, then for the Sunday Express and the Daily Star from 1977 to 1979 and again from 1983 to 1984. In total Horak worked on 33 James Bond comic strips sequences.

Horak also created the comic series Jet Fury, in addition to working on other comic strips such as Andrea, Cop Shop and Sergeant Pat of the Radio Patrol.

Horak also achieved a degree of popularity during the 1960s when he was employed by Fleetway Publications (later IPC Magazines) to contribute art for 11 of their comic books in the War Picture Library and Battle Picture Library series.

Horak was interviewed in 1995 by Ros Bowden. The recording can be found at the National Library of Australia.

Horak died on 24 November 2020 at the Whitehall Aged Care facility in Lindfield, New South Wales, after a decade-long struggle with Alzheimer's disease. He was cremated at the Macquarie Park Cemetery and Crematorium on 4 December 2020.

== War Picture Library ==
- WPL 214 Rough Justice 1963
- WPL 303 Death Or Dishonour 1965
- WPL 304 Battle Drill 1965
- WPL 315 Cross For Courage 1965
- WPL 323 Passage Of Arms 1966
- WPL 648 The Curse 1971
- BPL 156 The Savage Sands 1964
- BPL 173 The Stronghold 1964
- BPL 190 Killers Code 1965
- BPL 197 Gun Crazy 1965
- BPL 231 Victory Cry 1965

=== James Bond strips ===
Title	Writer	Published date	Serial no.
The Man with the Golden Gun	Jim Lawrence	10 January 1966 – 9 September 1966	1-209
The Living Daylights	Jim Lawrence	12 September 1966 – 12 November 1966	210-263
Octopussy	Jim Lawrence	14 November 1966 – 27 May 1967	264-428
The Hildebrand Rarity	Jim Lawrence	29 May 1967 – 16 December 1967	429-602
The Spy Who Loved Me	Jim Lawrence	18 December 1967 – 3 October 1968	603-815
The Harpies	Jim Lawrence	10 October 1968 – 23 June 1969	816-1037
River Of Death	Jim Lawrence	24 June 1969 – 29 November 1969	1038–1174
Colonel Sun	Jim Lawrence	1 December 1969 – 28 August 1970	1175–1393
The Golden Ghost	Jim Lawrence	21 August 1970 – 16 January 1971	1394–1519
Fear Face	Jim Lawrence	18 January 1971 – 20 April 1971	1520–1596
Double Jeopardy	Jim Lawrence	21 April 1971 – 28 August 1971	1597–1708
Starfire	Jim Lawrence	30 August 1971 – 24 December 1971	1709–1809
Trouble Spot	Jim Lawrence	28 December 1971 – 10 June 1972	1810–1951
Isle Of Condors	Jim Lawrence	12 June 1972 – 21 October 1972	1952–2065
The League Of Vampires	Jim Lawrence	25 October 1972 – 28 February 1973	2066–2172
Die With My Boots On	Jim Lawrence	1 March 1973 – 18 June 1973	2173–2256
The Girl Machine	Jim Lawrence	19 June 1973 – 3 December 1973	2257–2407
Beware Of Butterflies	Jim Lawrence	4 December 1973 – 11 May 1974	2408–2541
The Nevsky Nude	Jim Lawrence	13 May 1974 – 21 September 1974	2542–2655
The Phoenix Project	Jim Lawrence	23 September 1974 – 18 February 1975	2656–2780
The Black Ruby Caper	Jim Lawrence	19 February 1975 – 15 July 1975	2781–2897
Till Death Do Us Apart	Jim Lawrence	7 July 1975 – 14 October 1975	2989-2983
The Torch-Time Affair	Jim Lawrence	15 October 1975 – 15 January 1976	2984-3060
Hot-Shot	Jim Lawrence	16 January 1976 – 1 June 1976	3061-3178
Nightbird	Jim Lawrence	2 June 1976 – 4 November 1976	3179-3312
Ape Of Diamonds	Jim Lawrence	5 November 1976 – 22 January 1977	3313-3437
When The Wizard Awakes	Jim Lawrence	30 January 1977 – 22 May 1977	1-54
Sea Dragon	Jim Lawrence	1977	55-192
Death Wing	Jim Lawrence	1977-1978	193-354
The Xanadu Connection	Jim Lawrence	1978	355-468
Shark Bait	Jim Lawrence	1978-1979	469-636
Snake Goddess	Jim Lawrence	1983-1984	822-893
Double Eagle	Jim Lawrence	1984	894-965
