= John McLusky =

Scottish comic strip artist (1923–2006)

- Born: Hector John McLusky; 20 January 1923 Glasgow
- Died: 5 September 2006 (aged 83)
- Area: artist
- Notable works: James Bond

John McLusky (20 January 1923 – 5 September 2006) was a comics artist best known as the original artist of the comic strip featuring Ian Fleming's James Bond.

== Biography ==
Hector John Dewhirst McLusky was born in Glasgow, Scotland. He eventually moved with his two brothers, sister and parents, to Leeds, Yorkshire. They moved from Leeds to Leamington Spa in 1936. John (also known as Hector) attended Warwick School from 1936 to 1940, and, after a period back in Leeds, proceeded to the Slade School of Art where he held the position of Art Teacher.

John McLusky's rendition of James Bond

John McLusky began illustrating the comic strip adaptation of James Bond for the Daily Express. From 1958 to 1966, McLusky adapted 13 of Ian Fleming's James Bond novels or short stories.

After Yaroslav Horak had taken over the James Bond strip, McLusky drew Secret Agent 13 for Fleetway. For the magazine TV Comic McLusky illustrated several strips over 15 years, notably Look and Learn and strip adaptations for Laurel & Hardy, and the Pink Panther. In 1982 McLusky returned to illustrate the James Bond strip, collaborating with writer Jim Lawrence to illustrate four new original James Bond stories.

John McLusky continued other work throughout his career – including several years as Art History Lecturer and substitute teaching in Art & Art History. A passion of his was working as a Punch & Judy puppeteer on Bournemouth Pier & Filey in Yorkshire. He became a Professor of Punch & Judy which was in recognition of his knowledge & services to this time honoured tradition.

== James Bond strips ==
Art by John McLusky
| Title | Writer | Date | Serial no. |
|---|---|---|---|
| Casino Royale | Anthony Hern | 7 July – 13 December 1958 | 1-138 |
| Live and Let Die | Henry Gammidge | 15 December 1958 – 28 March 1959 | 139-225 |
| Moonraker | Henry Gammidge | 3 March – 8 August 1959 | 226-339 |
| Diamonds Are Forever | Henry Gammidge | 10 August 1959 – 30 January 1960 | 340-487 |
| From Russia, with Love | Henry Gammidge | 1 February – 21 May 1960 | 488-583 |
| Dr. No | Peter O'Donnell | 23 May – 1 October 1960 | 584-697 |
| Goldfinger | Henry Gammidge | 3 October 1960 – 1 April 1961 | 698-849 |
| Risico | Henry Gammidge | 3 April – 24 June 1961 | 850-921 |
| From a View to a Kill | Henry Gammidge | 26 June – 9 September 1961 | 922-987 |
| For Your Eyes Only | Henry Gammidge | 11 September – 9 December 1961 | 988-1065 |
| Thunderball | Henry Gammidge | 11 December 1961 – 10 February 1962 | 1066–1128 |
| On Her Majesty's Secret Service | Henry Gammidge | 29 June 1964 – 15 May 1965 | 1-274 |
| You Only Live Twice | Henry Gammidge | 17 May 1965 – 8 January 1966 | 275-475 |

=== Other work ===
- The Paradise Plot (1981-1982)
- Deathmask (1982–1983)
- Flittermouse (1983)
- Polestar (1983)
- The Scent Of Danger (1984)
