= Henry Gammidge =

- Born: 1915
- Died: 1981 (aged 65–66)
- Occupation: Cartoonist

Henry Francis Gammidge (1915–1981), was a writer of the James Bond comic strip that appeared in Daily Express newspaper and syndicated worldwide. Gammidge adapted Ian Fleming's James Bond novels, which were then drawn by illustrator John McLusky. Gammidge worked on eleven stories, which were published from 15 December 1958. Gammidge's last story was published on 8 January 1966.

== Bibliography ==
- Fleming, Ian; Gammidge, Henry; McLusky, John (1988). Octopussy. London: Titan Books. ISBN 1-85286-040-5.
- Simpson, Paul (2002). The Rough Guide to James Bond. Rough Guides. ISBN 978-1-84353-142-5.
