= List of James Bond villains =

Characters in the films and novels

The following is a list of primary antagonists in the James Bond novels and film series.

== Novel villains by author ==
=== Ian Fleming ===
Novel	Villain	Objective	Outcome	Fate
Casino Royale	Le Chiffre	Pay off his embarrassing debts to his SMERSH masters by winning the money at Casino Royale's baccarat table.	James Bond beats Le Chiffre at baccarat.	Shot in the head by a SMERSH hitman.
Live and Let Die	Mr. Big (Buonaparte Ignace Gallia)	Smuggle and sell ancient gold coins to finance SMERSH operations.	Bond kills Mr Big.	Eaten by sharks and barracuda after he falls into the water when Bond blows up his boat.
Moonraker	Sir Hugo Drax (Graf Hugo von der Drache)	Destroy London with a nuclear missile, the eponymous Moonraker.	Before the Moonraker is launched, Bond and Gala Brand escape. Gala gives Bond the proper coordinates to reprogram the gyros and send the Moonraker into the sea.	Drax and his men escape to the North Sea in a Soviet submarine, but are killed in the explosion of the Moonraker when it lands in their vicinity.
Diamonds Are Forever	Jack Spang	Smuggle a large cache of diamonds worth millions of dollars from Africa to America to fund organisation.	Smuggling operation is dismantled when all operatives are assassinated.	Killed when Bond shoots down his helicopter.
Diamonds Are Forever	Seraffimo Spang	Smuggle a large cache of diamonds worth millions of dollars from Africa to America to fund organisation.	Smuggling operation is dismantled when all operatives are assassinated.	Bond shoots him while he is driving a train, causing it to derail and crash.
From Russia, with Love	General Grubozaboyschikov	Kill Bond in a humiliating sex scandal, kill MI6 cryptanalysts with a boobytrapped cipher machine.	Bond kills SMERSH assassin Grant and foils the booby trap plot, but is nearly killed by Klebb with a poisoned shoe blade.	Unknown. Presumably fell out of favor and replaced as the head of SMERSH.
From Russia, with Love	Rosa Klebb	Kill Bond in a humiliating sex scandal, kill MI6 cryptanalysts with a boobytrapped cipher machine.	Bond kills SMERSH assassin Grant and foils the booby trap plot, but is nearly killed by Klebb with a poisoned shoe blade.	Captured by the Deuxième Bureau and later dies.
Dr. No	Dr. Julius No	Disrupt U.S.-guided missile tests.	Dr. No is killed and the project is dismantled.	Buried under a pile of guano by Bond.
Goldfinger	Auric Goldfinger	Steal the U.S. gold supply from Fort Knox to finance SMERSH.	U.S. authorities are alerted by Bond.	Strangled by Bond with his bare hands in a fit of rage after hijacking an aeroplane.
"From a View to a Kill" (short story)	GRU agents	Kill dispatch-riders of SHAPE to steal information from the British Secret Service.	The riders are killed but the information is recovered by Bond.	Shot by Bond and Mary Ann Russell.
"For Your Eyes Only" (short story)	Colonel von Hammerstein	Acquire the Havelock estate in Jamaica to use as a headquarters for a drug running operation.	Obtains the estate, but both are later killed.	Killed by Judy Havelock with an arrow.
"For Your Eyes Only" (short story)	Hector Gonzales	Acquire the Havelock estate in Jamaica to use as a headquarters for a drug running operation.	Obtains the estate, but both are later killed.	Shot by Bond in firefight.
"Risico" (short story)	Aristotle Kristatos	Smuggle drugs, aid Soviet missile development, and trick Bond into killing rival.	Bond discovers the truth.	Shot by Bond while driving his car, and the car rolls off into the fog.
"The Hildebrand Rarity" (short story)	Milton Krest	Catch the Hildebrand Rarity by any means necessary.	Succeeds, but dies.	Chokes to death on the rare fish, possibly murdered by either his battered wife Liz Krest or a guest on his yacht he offended earlier that night. Bond throws the body overboard.
Thunderball	Emilio Largo	Blackmail the western world with two stolen atomic bombs.	Bond discovers the location of the bombs.	Shot in the neck with a speargun by his mistress, Domino Vitali.
Thunderball	Ernst Stavro Blofeld	Blackmail the western world with two stolen atomic bombs.	Bond discovers the location of the bombs.	Survives.
The Spy Who Loved Me	Mr. Sanguinetti	Have his motel burnt down, and have Vivienne Michel assassinated to claim the property and life insurances.	His assassins fail to kill Vivienne and set the place on fire.	Arrested by the U.S. Border Patrol.
The Spy Who Loved Me	Sol "Horror" Horowitz and "Sluggsy" Morant	Assassinate Vivienne Michel under orders of Mr. Sanguinetti and torch the motel owned by Sanguinetti.	They fail to kill Vivienne and are killed themselves.	Both are shot to death by Bond.
On Her Majesty's Secret Service	Ernst Stavro Blofeld (a.k.a. Comte Balthazar le Bleuville)	Develop a deadly virus to destroy British livestock and cereals.	The virus and their headquarters are destroyed by Bond and Marc-Ange Draco's Union Corse.	Survives.
You Only Live Twice	Ernst Stavro Blofeld (a.k.a. Dr. Guntram Shatterhand)	He creates a "garden of death" and entices depressed Japanese to suicide. He charges for the suicides to refinance SPECTRE.	His lair is destroyed and his henchmen are killed by Bond.	Strangled by Bond with his bare hands in a fit of rage.
The Man with the Golden Gun	Francisco (Paco) "Pistols" Scaramanga	Expand his international crime organisation into the Caribbean and organise smuggling operations to finance it.	Kills one associate; another is shot by Felix Leiter; the others die in a bridge explosion.	Shot through the heart by Bond.
"Octopussy" (short story)	Major Dexter Smythe	Live off looted Nazi gold.	Discovered by Bond, he is faced with the choice between prosecution and suicide.	Accidentally stung by a scorpionfish, then partially eaten by an octopus.
"The Property of a Lady" (short story)	Maria Freudenstein and her Soviet contact	Receive secret payment for double agent services.	Succeeds.	Survives, but her contact is deported.
"The Living Daylights" (short story)	Trigger, KGB assassin	Assassinate defector.	Her gun is shot out of her hand before she can kill the defector.	Wounded by Bond, she survives and escapes.
"007 in New York" (short story)	KGB double-agent	Blackmail MI6 using a female employee.	Employee is tipped off by Bond.	Arrested by the CIA.

=== Kingsley Amis (writing as Robert Markham) ===
Novel	Villain	Objective	Outcome	Fate
Colonel Sun	Colonel Sun Liang-tan	Sabotage USSR summit conference, frame Great Britain.	Operatives are killed, and summit conference members are alerted.	Stabbed in the back and heart by Bond.

=== Christopher Wood ===
Novel	Villain	Objective	Outcome	Fate
James Bond, the Spy Who Loved Me	Sigmund Stromberg	Use stolen submarines to provoke a nuclear war between the U.S. and the Soviets, then rebuild humanity under the ocean.	Bond destroys his base and blows up the submarines.	Shot twice in the groin and twice in the chest by Bond.
James Bond and Moonraker	Hugo Drax	Fire a nerve agent from space to kill the entire population of earth, then create a new civilisation in space.	Bond destroys his space station and, with it, the globes containing the nerve agent.	Shot with a poison dart by Bond before being pushed out of an airlock and blown into the vacuum of space.

=== John Gardner ===
Novel	Villain	Objective	Outcome	Fate
Licence Renewed	Dr. Anton Murik	Hold nuclear power plants hostage in exchange for $50 billion to build a safe reactor.	Bond gives the abort order to the henchmen.	Shot by Bond with Gyrojet pistol.
For Special Services	SPECTRE – Nena Bismaquer (née Blofeld)	Use Bond to take control of NORAD.	Nena's husband, Markus Bismaquer, breaks her hypnotic spell on Bond before the plan succeeds.	Crushed by her own pythons.
Icebreaker	Count Konrad von Glöda (also known as "Aarne Tudeer")	Bring back Nazism by wiping out Communists.	Bond defeats him with the aid of Paula Vacker, a Supo agent and Brad Tirpitz, a member of the CIA.	Shot by Bond.
Role of Honour	Jay Autem Holy	Disarm U.S. and Soviet nuclear weaponry through a computerised scheme to create world peace.	Bond's "defection" to SPECTRE is actually a ruse, and he ruins them.	Shot and killed by Rahani.
Role of Honour	Tamil Rahani (SPECTRE)	Disarm the U.S. nuclear weaponry to give the USSR an advantage in the Cold War.	Bond's "defection" to SPECTRE is actually a ruse, and he ruins them.	Escapes, but injures himself in his parachute landing, contracting cancer in his spinal cord and left terminally ill, with a short time left, between days and four months.
Nobody Lives for Ever	Tamil Rahani (SPECTRE)	Put a large bounty on Bond's head to have him assassinated following his terminal spinal cord diagnosis.	Bond kills him.	Blown up by bed bomb, courtesy of Bond.
No Deals, Mr. Bond	General Konstantin Nikolaevich Chernov (also known as "Blackfriar")	Kill all participants in a defunct espionage operation.	Bond saves them.	Arrested.
Scorpius	Vladimir Scorpius (also known as "Father Valentine")	Carry out assassinations with a cult of suicide bombers, ultimately kill the U.S. president and British prime minister.	The cult is raided and disbanded, and the president and prime minister are saved.	Bitten by cottonmouths.
Win, Lose or Die	BAST–Bassam Baradj	Capture aircraft carrier with US, UK, and USSR leaders on board and hold them for ransom.	Bond overtakes the ship.	Shot by Bond's ally Beatrice Maria da Ricci.
Licence to Kill (novelization)	Franz Sanchez	Smuggle drugs.	Bond destroys the factory.	Set on fire by Bond.
Brokenclaw	"Brokenclaw" Lee Fu-Chu	Sell secret plans for underwater defence system to Red China, and crash the world stock market with a computerised scheme.	Chinese agents captured and impersonated by Bond and ally Sue Chi-Ho, and their base is blown up.	Shot by Bond with bow and arrow.
The Man from Barbarossa	General Yevgeny Yuskovich	Supply Iraq with nuclear weapons.	Battleship with nuclear weapons destroyed.	Dies when his ship is blown up.
Death is Forever	Wolfgang Weisen	Assassinate all members of British-American CABAL, and destabilise Western Europe by blowing up train containing several world leaders.	Train remotely stopped before it can reach its destination.	Electrocuted on train railing.
Never Send Flowers	David Dragonpol	Assassinate Princess Diana and her sons at Euro Disney.	The royal family is prevented from arriving at Euro Disney.	Blown up by his own bomb.
SeaFire	Sir Maxwell Tarn	Start oil spill fire during demonstration with U-boat.	Bond destroys the submarine.	Burns to death when Bond shoots him with a flare.
GoldenEye (novelization)	Alec Trevelyan	Ruin London's economy.	His base is destroyed.	Crushed by falling debris.
COLD	General Brutus Clay	Replace government with Puritan society.	Bond discovers his plan and notifies his superiors to bomb the base.	Bond shoots him off a boat and he drowns in the water.

=== Raymond Benson ===
Novel	Villain	Objective	Outcome	Fate
"Blast from the Past" (short story)	Irma Bunt	Kill James Bond by shaving him with a razor soaked in Japanese pufferfish poison and "accidentally" nicking him.	Bond is rescued by MI6 agent Cheryl Haven.	Shot by Bond.
Zero Minus Ten	Guy Thackeray	Destroy Hong Kong with a nuclear bomb.	The location of the bomb is discovered, and the bomb is neutralised.	Drowned by Bond.
Tomorrow Never Dies (novelization)	Elliot Carver	Initiate a war between the United Kingdom and China by destroying Beijing to boost ratings.	Bond and Wai Lin destroy the bomb and Carver's base.	Forced into the path of the Sea-Vac drill, controlled by Bond, and killed.
The Facts of Death	Konstantine Romanos	Instigate war between Greece and Turkey by firing nuclear missile into Turkey.	Killed by fellow Decada member Hera Volopoulos.	Killed by Hera.
The Facts of Death	Hera Volopoulos	Release virus onto the world and profit from treatment.	Stopped with assistance from Greek military.	Blown up, then drowned by Bond.
"Midsummer Night's Doom" (short story)	Anton Redenius	Sell Ministry of Defence secrets to the Russian Mafia.	After being identified as the culprit, the microfilm is retrieved by Bond.	Arrested.
High Time to Kill	Roland Marquis	Retrieve Skin 17 microdot from corpse on Kangchenjunga mountain before Bond does and sell it to the Russian Mafia.	Marquis gives Bond the microdot in exchange for oxygen.	Chased by Bond to the mountain's peak and dies of oxygen deprivation.
High Time to Kill	Le Gérant, The Union	Retrieve the microdot and sell it to the Chinese government.	Marquis gives Bond the microdot in exchange for oxygen.	Survives.
The World Is Not Enough (novelization)	Elektra King	Kill her father to take over his oil business and destroy Istanbul in order to monopolise the oil market.	Succeeds in killing her father, Sir Robert King, but Bond kills her and Renard's submarine is sunk.	Shot in the chest by Bond.
The World Is Not Enough (novelization)	Victor 'Renard' Zokas	Assassinate Elektra's father and then use a nuclear submarine to destroy Istanbul; allowing him to commit one final act of terror and giving Elektra leverage over the oil industry.	Succeeds in killing Sir Robert King, but Bond kills Elektra, kills him and sinks the submarine.	Impaled by his own plutonium rod shot out of the reactor by Bond.
"Live at Five" (short story)	KGB (Natalia's coach)	Prevent Russian ice skater Natalia Lustokov's defection to the West.	Bond helps Natalia defect on live television.	The KGB is embarrassed in public.
DoubleShot	Domingo Espada	Overthrow Gibraltar's government with a series of assassinations, then frame James Bond by using a lookalike Peredeur Glyn as assassin and install Espada as the new governor.	Bond kills his double Glyn and takes his place, foiling the coup.	Shot through cheek by Bond and chokes to death on his own blood.
DoubleShot	Le Gérant, The Union	Overthrow Gibraltar's government with a series of assassinations, then frame James Bond by using a lookalike Peredeur Glyn as assassin and install Espada as the new governor.	Bond kills his double Glyn and takes his place, foiling the coup.	Survives.
Never Dream of Dying	Le Gérant, The Union	Make a political statement about Western decadence by blowing up the Cannes Film Festival with CL-20 explosives.	Bond discovers the location of the bomb, prevents remote detonation by telephone call, and informs the authorities.	Blown up in an escape helicopter by Bond's grenade launcher. The Union is permanently disbanded soon after.
Never Dream of Dying	Goro Yoshida	Make a political statement about Western decadence by blowing up the Cannes Film Festival with CL-20 explosives.	Bond discovers the location of the bomb, prevents remote detonation by telephone call, and informs the authorities.	Survives.
The Man with the Red Tattoo	Goro Yoshida	Release a deadly mutant strain of the West Nile virus via mosquitoes on the Western world.	The virus is destroyed.	Commits seppuku before he can be captured by Bond.
Die Another Day (novelization)	Colonel Moon/Gustav Graves	Smuggle diamonds and use the Icarus satellite to attack South Korea before invading it.	Bond dismantles the diamond smuggling operation and the Icarus controls are destroyed.	His escape vehicle is driven over a cliff, then his parachute is opened by Bond next to the torn fuselage, sucking him out into the plane engine.
The Hook and the Eye (Felix Leiter Novel)	Michael Brinkley	Sell a microdot containing the plans for a hydrogen bomb to the Soviet Union.	Felix swaps out the quarter that the microdot is on for a fake one, and kills Brinkley's assassins.	Arrested.

=== Sebastian Faulks ===
Novel	Villain	Objective	Outcome	Fate
Devil May Care	Dr. Julius Gorner	Import opium into Britain, and force Bond to pilot an airliner into Soviet territory and bomb it, making it appear to be the UK's doing.	Bond gains control of the airliner and crashes it into a mountainside.	Shot by Bond, he jumps into a river to escape, where he is torn apart by a boat's paddles.

=== Jeffery Deaver ===
Novel	Villain	Objective	Outcome	Fate
Carte Blanche	Severan Hydt	Use a prototype Serbian weapon known as a "Cutter" to destroy a university in York, killing a cancer researcher who could ruin his employer, a pharmaceutical corporation.	Bond is able to warn British authorities about the Cutter before it detonates.	Shot by an associate, Niall Dunne.
Carte Blanche	Felicity Willing	Uses her position as head of the International Organisation Against Hunger to strategically distribute food aid across northern Africa, giving the government of Sudan a pretext to go to war with the south; set Dunne up in Hydt's organization and put authorities on his trail so they don't interfere.	She is tricked into confessing to the scheme by Bond and Bheka Jordaan.	Extradited to a secret location after evidence is planted to suggest she was embezzling money from her Chinese backers.

=== William Boyd ===
Novel	Villain	Objective	Outcome	Fate
Solo	Kobus Breed	Use Dahumni children as drug mules to smuggle raw heroin into the States.	Bond tracks him down to Washington, D.C.	Breed is shot and left for dead by Bond.

=== Anthony Horowitz ===
Novel	Villain	Objective	Outcome	Fate
Trigger Mortis	Jason Sin	Sabotage US rocket test launch. Blow up the Empire State Building with train bomb and make it appear to be the rocket's doing by spreading debris of duplicate rocket around bomb site. Use public outcry to give USSR advantage in the Space Race.	Bomb neutralized and train derailed en route to the Empire State Building.	Electrocuted by train railing.
Forever and a Day	Irwin Wolfe	Smuggle more than 5,000 pounds of heroin into the United States using his yacht Mirabelle and start a narcotic addiction epidemic. This is intended to force the US government to focus on combating the epidemic rather than engaging in wars abroad, thereby preventing American soldiers from dying in combat as his two sons had.	Mirabelle destroyed by a bomb blast, thus destroying the heroin shipment	Shot by corrupt CIA agent Reade Griffith
Forever and a Day	Jean-Paul Scipio	Expand his heroin monopoly beyond Corsica and into the United States by assisting with Wolfe's plan.	Mirabelle destroyed by a bomb blast, thus destroying the heroin shipment	Drowned on the sinking Mirabelle after becoming stuck in a passageway due to his obese size.
Forever and a Day	Reade Griffith	Double agent who aids Scipio and Wolfe as part of a CIA objective to fight Communism with organised crime.	Assassinates Wolfe after Scipio's death and frames it as a suicide.	Shot by Bond in return after Griffith admits to being an accessory to Bond's predecessor's death (with Bond suspecting Griffith of blowing the former's cover). Bond restages the crime scene to prove Griffith's crime.
With a Mind to Kill	Colonel Boris	Force a brainwashed James Bond to carry out an assassination on Nikita Khrushchev for his liberal views, thus making it appear that British intelligence had attacked the USSR. Use the ensuing chaos to insert a more hardline communist President.	Bond is not really brainwashed, and instead assassinates Colonel Boris, who is in the same crowd as Khrushchev.	Shot through the right eye by Bond.
With a Mind to Kill	General Nicholai Grubozaboyschikov	Force a brainwashed James Bond to carry out an assassination on Nikita Khrushchev for his liberal views, thus making it appear that British intelligence had attacked the USSR. Use the ensuing chaos to insert a more hardline communist President.	Bond is not really brainwashed, and instead assassinates Colonel Boris, who is in the same crowd as Khrushchev.	Unknown, though it is speculated that he will commit suicide.

=== Charlie Higson ===
Novel	Villain	Objective	Outcome	Fate
On His Majesty's Secret Service	Æthelstan of Wessex	Take over the throne of the United Kingdom by crashing its economy, restoring the country into an Absolute Monarchy.	Bond's military contacts stage their planned assault early at Æthelstan's base after Bond's cover was blown, disrupting the former's plans and forcing him on the run.	Mercy-killed by Bond after being fatally gunned down by his former associate, Ragneiður Radnarsdóttir. Bond also foils an assassination attempt on Charles III by Æthelstan's illegitimate daughter after being tipped off by Ragneiður.
King Zero	Martin 'King Zero' Koenig	Destabilize the world by imitating the effects of a solar flare with the use of a ring of satellites around the planet. Then mold the ruins into the image of King Zero and his allies.	Bond's associate, Navy Riordan, uses a USB that has King Zero's AI system target his headquarters. Correctly deducing hat the AI will not destroy itself, the countdown comes and goes without the satellites activating.	Trapped in his castle because of an out of control fire. Devoured by his white lions after they seek shelter.
King Zero	Jackson St. Bride	Destabilize the world by imitating the effects of a solar flare with the use of a ring of satellites around the planet. Then mold the ruins into the image of King Zero and his allies.	Bond's associate, Navy Riordan, uses a USB that has King Zero's AI system target his headquarters. Correctly deducing hat the AI will not destroy itself, the countdown comes and goes without the satellites activating.	Crushed beneath a JCB wheel loader driven by Bond.
King Zero	Malika Theodosia	Destabilize the world by imitating the effects of a solar flare with the use of a ring of satellites around the planet. Then mold the ruins into the image of King Zero and his allies.	Bond's associate, Navy Riordan, uses a USB that has King Zero's AI system target his headquarters. Correctly deducing hat the AI will not destroy itself, the countdown comes and goes without the satellites activating.	Stabbed in the neck by her associate, Tanith, then dragged underwater by sharks.

=== Dan Jones ===
Novel	Villain	Objective	Outcome	Fate
All In				

=== Double O series ===
==== Kim Sherwood ====
Novel	Villain	Objective	Outcome	Fate
Double or Nothing	Sir Bertram Paradise	Use his Cloud Nine geo-engineering technology in the Sea of Okhotsk to worsen the climate crisis by melting glaciers to open new trade routes for him and his backers.	Joseph Dryden destroys the engine powering Cloud Nine in time to stop the worst effects of Paradise's plan taking effect.	Mauled by his pet tiger before being shot in the head by Joseph Dryden.
Double or Nothing	Colonel Mora	Use Sir Bertram Paradise's quantum supercomputer, Celestial, to assist in monitoring security agencies and covering up the activities of Rattenfänger, the Private Military Company that Colonel Mora is the head of.	Johanna Harwood and Sid Bashir rescue Celestial's creator Dr Zofia Nowak, kidnapped by Rattenfänger after Sir Bertram Paradise stopped working with them, and secure Celestial for recovery.	Tranquilised by Johanna Harwood and taken away for questioning.
A Spy Like Me	Lisl Baum	Continue her role as Rattenfänger's treasurer; help break Colonel Mora out of prison.	Succeeds. A terrorist attack on American soil is prevented when the British government releases Colonel Mora and other Rattenfänger assets.	Survives.
A Spy Like Me	Valentin 'Teddy' Wiltshire	Smuggle people, antiquities, and diamonds in order to fund Rattenfänger.	Succeeds.	Shot with a shotgun by Johanna Harwood.
A Spy Like Me	Friedrich Hyde	Smuggle people, antiquities, and diamonds in order to fund Rattenfänger.	Succeeds.	Shot with a sniper rifle by Harthrop-Vane.
A Spy Like Me	Viktor Babič	Smuggle people, antiquities, and diamonds in order to fund Rattenfänger.	Succeeds.	Shot through the head by Rachel Wolff.
Hurricane Room	Colonel Mora	Feed the Q quantum supercomputer false information to the Five Eyes surveillance program, Panopticon, to lure patrolling ships to the Arctic Bridge. With the United Kingdom's coastline clear, Rattenfänger's shadow fleet will access subsea Internet traffic cables and destroy them, effectively shutting off the Internet in the U.K. Then use the ensuing chaos to shift the global balance of power northward, where embezzled funds will be used to fund the Russian army to back his coup d'état of the Kremlin.	Moneypenny radios a message to London to shut down Panopticon and warns about Rattenfänger's shadow fleet.	Stabbed in the chest, then shot through the forehead by Bond. His corpse is dragged away by a polar bear.
Hurricane Room	Sir Emery Ware	Cover up his dealings with Colonel Mora for sacrificing Double O agents in return for intelligence that keeps the United Kingdom relevant to Five Eyes. Later use the Panopticon program as a mass surveillance tool to locate potential threats anywhere in the world.	A picture taken by Charles Harwood reveals his collusion with Mora to Bond and Johanna Harwood.	While Five Eyes, Bond, Renè Mathis, and Tiger Tanaka discuss the punishment Ware will face, Johanna Harwood sneaks into the room he is detained in, and shoots him through the back of the heart.

=== Young Bond series ===
==== Charlie Higson ====
Novel	Villain	Objective	Outcome	Fate
SilverFin	Lord Randolph Hellebore	Achieve world domination with an army of humans made more powerful through the use of a serum that manipulates hormones and the endocrine system.	Bond and George Hellebore wreck his laboratory by smashing the serum tubes and igniting the paperwork.	Eaten alive by eels alongside his mutated brother Algar Hellebore.
Blood Fever	Count Ugo Carnifex	Steal paintings and sculptures from around the world using the aid of a secret band of villains named the Milennaria.	His associate Zoltan floods his palace for his failure.	Dies in the chaos of the flooding fortress when struck by his own seaplane.
Double or Die	Irina Sedova "Babushka"	Create an innovative decoding machine for the Russians called the Nemesis.	Bond destroys the machine.	Spared by Bond. Returns in By Royal Command, where she once again survives.
Hurricane Gold	Mrs. Glass	Sell important American documents to the Japanese.	Succeeds.	Imprisoned on Huracán's island.
Hurricane Gold	El Huracán	Punish all guests on his island who break his rules.	Bond beats his obstacle course and escapes.	Spared by Bond.
By Royal Command	Dr. Perseus Friend	Assist the Nazi cause by making a plan to murder King George, and also stage a personal vendetta against James Bond after he foiled his work at the end of SilverFin.	Bond saves the king, destroys Friend's operation and forces Sedova to kill Friend.	Shot in the face by Colonel Sedova.
By Royal Command	Irina Sedova "Babushka"	Find and kill Friend after King George is dead.	Bond saves the king, destroys Friend's operation and forces Sedova to kill Friend.	Shot by Bond, but survives because of her bulletproof jacket.
"A Hard Man to Kill" (short story)	Emil Lefebvre	Help General Caiboche escape.	Succeeds.	
"A Hard Man to Kill" (short story)	Caiboche	Escape from custody.	Succeeds.	Survives.

==== Steve Cole ====
Novel	Villain	Objective	Outcome	Fate
Shoot to Kill	Anton Kostler	Take control of the media worldwide by filming other people's torturing and killing by him.	Bond foils his plans by exposing him to the British Secret Services then killing him.	Burned alive by the fire on his zeppelin accidentally ignited by him, then impaled on a tree branch through his left eye.
Heads You Die	Audacto 'Scolopendra' Solares	Blackmail Great Britain to become a vassal of the Soviet Union with poisoned money presented in its economy.	All the poisoned banknotes were destroyed in a fire.	Stabbed in the back by his daughter, Jagua Solares.
Heads You Die	La Velada	Manipulate Scolopendra to help her achieve her own goals, then kill him.	All the poisoned banknotes were destroyed in a fire.	Survives.
Strike Lightning	Konstantin Grünner	Buy and use the prototype Steel Shadow battlesuits to aid Nazi war efforts.	All battlesuits destroyed.	Incinerated by molten metal.
Red Nemesis	Andrei Karachan	Kill King George V at the Royal Opera House with explosives; then place their mimicking henchman, Mimic, in his place, so they can rule Great Britain.	Bond foils their plans by exposing and killing them.	Killed by Bond and Anya Kalashnikova using the Beretta 418 once belonged to Andrew Bond.
Red Nemesis	La Velada	Kill King George V at the Royal Opera House with explosives; then place their mimicking henchman, Mimic, in his place, so they can rule Great Britain.	Bond foils their plans by exposing and killing them.	Blown up by Bond.
Red Nemesis	Adam Elmhirst	Kill King George V at the Royal Opera House with explosives; then place their mimicking henchman, Mimic, in his place, so they can rule Great Britain.	Bond foils their plans by exposing and killing them.	Falls from a radio tower after getting shot by Bond and gets impaled by an adjacent mast.

=== Q Mysteries ===
==== Vaseem Khan ====
Novel	Villain	Objective	Outcome	Fate
Quantum of Menace				
The Man with the Golden Compass				

== Villains by comics ==
=== Comic strips ===
==== Daily Express (1958–1977) ====
Comic strip serials released by the Daily Express between 1958 and 1977 were divided in two distinct eras, the John McLusky era from 1958 to 1966, and Yaroslav Horak and Jim Lawrence era from 1966 to 1977. The Daily Express Bond strips drawn during McLusky era are streamlined adaptations of the Ian Fleming novels and short stories, and feature mainly the same villains.

During the Yaroslav Horak and Jim Lawrence era, many of the adaptations of Ian Fleming short stories that were featured in For Your Eyes Only, The Spy Who Loved Me and Octopussy and The Living Daylights were expanded upon. Furthermore, the duo would start to write original Bond stories, starting with the 1968 storyline "The Harpies".

The Daily Express discontinued publishing James Bond comic strips in 1977. The original creative – Horak, Lawrence and McLusky – would subsequently develop Bond comic strips for other British and European syndications from 1977 to 1984.

Storyline	Villain	Objective	Outcome	Fate
The Man with the Golden Gun (10 January 1966 – 9 September 1966)	Francisco Scaramanga			
The Living Daylights (12 September 1966 – 12 November 1966)	"Trigger"			
Octopussy (14 November 1966 – 27 May 1967)	Maj. Dexter Smythe			
The Hildebrand Rarity (29 May 1967 – 16 December 1967)	Milton Krest			
The Spy Who Loved Me (18 December 1967 – 3 October 1968)	Horst Uhlmann			
The Spy Who Loved Me (18 December 1967 – 3 October 1968)	Madam Spectra			
The Spy Who Loved Me (18 December 1967 – 3 October 1968)	Mr. Sanguinetti			
The Harpies (10 October 1968 – 23 June 1969)	Simon Nero			
River of Death (24 June 1969 – 29 November 1969)	Dr. Cat			
Colonel Sun (1 December 1969 – 28 August 1970)	Colonel Sun Liang-tan			Stabbed by Bond and eventually succumbs to the wounds
The Golden Ghost (21 August 1970 – 16 January 1971)	Felix Ignace Bruhl	Hold wealthy passengers aboard the Golden Ghost airship for ransom	The Royal Navy rescues the hostages	Falls to his death while charging Bond
Fear Face (18 January 1971 – 20 April 1971)	Ferenc Kress			
Double Jeopardy (21 April 1971 – 28 August 1971)	Fritz Kumura			
Starfire (30 August 1971 – 24 December 1971)	Luke Quantrill			
Trouble Spot (28 December 1971 – 10 June 1972)	Baron Sharck			
Isle of Condors (12 June 1972 – 21 October 1972)	Niccolo Uccelli			
The League of Vampires (25 October 1972 – 28 February 1973)	Xerxes Xerophanos	Use his vampire cult to eliminate his business rivals and secure monopoly on computer components		
Die with My Boots On (1 March 1973 – 18 June 1973)	Benny 'the Barber' Pignelli			
The Girl Machine (19 June 1973 – 3 December 1973)	Sheikh Harun El-Adar			
Beware of Butterflies (4 December 1973 – 11 May 1974)	Attila			
The Nevsky Nude (13 May 1974 – 21 September 1974)	Sir Ulric Herne			
The Phoenix Project (23 September 1974 – 18 February 1975)	Kazim			
The Black Ruby Caper(19 February 1975 – 15 July 1975)	Herr Rubin			
Till Death Do Us Apart (7 July 1975 – 14 October 1975)	Stefan Radomir			
The Torch-Time Affair (15 October 1975 – 15 January 1976)	Carmen Perez & Ricardo Auza			
Hot-Shot (16 January 1976 – 1 June 1976)	Dr. Julius No (alias Mr. Huliraya)	Use puppet terrorist cell to eliminate competition	Ship scuttled by Bond	Dies with the ship
Nightbird (2 June 1976 – 4 November 1976)	Ferdinand Polgar	Get revenge on those who burned his face by causing a major explosion	Helicopter shot down; Bond and Smoky track him down at his yacht	Knifed by Bond
Ape of Diamonds (5 November 1976 – 22 January 1977)	Hartley Rameses	Ransom the Crown Jewels of England via remote-controlled gorilla attacks	Bond gains control of the murderous ape	Thrown out the window by his pet ape (perhaps captured)

==== Other comic strips (1977–1984) ====
Storyline	Villain	Objective	Outcome	Fate
When the Wizard Awakes (30 January 1977 – 22 May 1977)	Attila Toth	Convince the Hungarian government that a fraudulent copy of the Crown of St. Stephen is real, earning a payday; sell Hungarian missile scientists to the Soviet Union, earning an even bigger payday.	Bond lets both sales go forward, then gets the drop on Toth; later he paraglides onto the Russian submarine to get the scientists back.	Shot and/or hit by molten metal.
Sea Dragon (1977)	Magda Mather	Buy into an oil consortium, or failing that, assassinate its leaders; wreck their value by destroying their oil rig with her Sea Dragon submarine, then buy all their shares at a low cost.	Assassinates all three leaders; Bond prevents her sub from escaping and saves the rig.	Survives and is captured.
Death Wing (1977–1978)	Matteo Mortellito			
The Xanadu Connection (1978)	Kubla Khan & Tekla Brent			
Shark Bait (1978–1979)	Colonel Yurogin			
Doomcrack (2 February 1981 – 19 August 1981)	Madam Spectra			
The Paradise Plot (20 August 1981 – 4 June 1982 )	Gabriel Starovsky / Father Star			
Deathmask (7 June 1982 – 2 February 1983)	Ivor Nyborg			
Flittermouse (9 February 1983 – 20 May 1983)	Dr. Cat			
Polestar (23 May 1983 – 15 July 1983)	Robert Ayr			
The Scent of Danger (1983)	Madam Spectra (as Madam Della Rosa)			
Snake Goddess (1983–1984)	Vidyala			
Double Eagle (1984)	Wulf Ehrnt			

==== Semic Press comic books / strips (1982–1994) ====
Storyline	Villain	Objective	Outcome	Fate
The Golden Triangle (1982)	Timothy Greene	Smuggle opium/heroin, blaming the Russian KGB for it, and avenge his perceived slight against M while masquerading as an ally to England.	Bond is captured and Greene tries to turn him into a heroin junkie, but his henchwoman Mai Ley changes sides.	Knifed in the back by Mai Ley.
Jungle Devils (1982)	Manuel Alves	Become the sole ruler-dictator of a breakaway section of Brazil the size of Europe; capture James Bond to give to SPECTRE.	Bond gets the jump on his 'jungle devils' gang, steals their helicopter and attacks his base.	Crashes in helicopter shot down by Bond and his allies.
The Slave Traders (1983)	Rhys Cogan / Vasily Pensikov	Smuggle slaves from Africa into NATO countries to make a profit. / Publicize existence of said slaves to embarrass NATO countries on behalf of the KGB.	Posing as a mute slave, Bond kills his way through Cogan's pipeline.	Killed in airplane crash on runway. / Flushed out by Bond; lives.
Codename: Nemesis (1983)	Arthur Grimsley / Sir Barnes Marsden	Start the Fourth Reich by poisoning the East German water supply with mind-altering drugs. / Use James Bond and MI6 to eliminate his co-traitors and escape detection.	Bond is assigned to protect Grimsley and Fosberry, but changes plans when he realizes Grimsley's intent. / It transpires that M was aware of Marsden's treachery the whole time.	Shot by Bond. / Captured by police.
Operation: Burma (1983)	Yan Lun Chieng / Lord Omar	Profit off of fighting between the Soviets and British over metal deposits from a meteor. / Rule a small kingdom in the Burmese jungle.	Bond escapes Omar's tiger trap, then escapes Lun Chieng and his pilot Belinda.	Blown up by surface-to-air missile fired by Bond / murdered (offscreen) by unknown assailant.
Liquidate Bond! (1983)	Col. Lev Makar	Manipulate brainwashed 002 agent John Winter to assassinate political enemies and lure Bond into a trap, all to regain power at the Kremlin.	Bond communicates with Russian paratroopers through a hidden transmitter, and calls them in to descend on Makar's base.	Russian troops assassinate Makar and Winter.
The White Death (1983)	Dr. Osvald Dobrowny / Dr. Kurt Hencker (aka Col. Charles Heinke)	Clear land in the Amazon rainforest of native tribes to make way for rich developers.	Bond and ally Rosita Cortez get chased into the jungle, but with the help of tribal leader Yayac destroy Hencker's jungle base.	Both men blown up in their van by Bond's rocket launcher.
Deadly Doubleplay (1984)				
Operation Little (1984)				
The Mad Emperor (1984)				
Operation Juggernaut (1984)	Ernst Stavro Blofeld	Build an army of indestructible lifelike robots (including of Ronald Reagan and Margaret Thatcher) that will infiltrate every level of society.	Plot starts to work, until Bond visits the 'realtor to the criminal masterminds' who points him to Blofeld's hiding place.	Escapes.
Operation UFO (1985)	Ilia of Deokas (KGB)	Fake a squadron of UFOs and a moon base in order to kidnap and brainwash scientists into a believe that all nations must bow to the Soviet Union.	Bond notices a pigeon and a rat on the 'moon base', and escapes to go lead an assault on it.	Captured.
Operation Blucher (1985)	Sir Ernest Gotheringham / Erik Blegman	Capture old Nazi documents on the sunken sub Blücher that reveal him as a WWII traitor. / Initiate a Neo-Nazi revolution in England.	Bond foils Blegman's terrorist explosion, then follows him to Brighton.	Shot by Bond / Shot by Gotheringham.
Operation Romeo (1985)	Walter Junghans	Assassinate world leaders using his missile guidance system for a payday from the mafia.	His target and Bond hide in a bunker to avoid the blast.	Blown up by his own missile.
The Green Death (1985)	Dominique de Blom	Use her army of modified, semi-sentient plants to take over the world and install a women-only dictatorship.	Bond uses pills that make him unappetizing to gators to survive her swamp, then stops her attack.	Captured.
Death in Tahiti (1985)	Francois Duchesne / Guy Le Couteau	Stage a pirate takeover of the Veronique Duchesne cruise ship for the insurance money.	Bond removes the bombs and uses them to destroy the pirate ship instead.	Shot by Bond / Blown up by his own bomb.
Bride from the Balkans (1985)				
Chinese Puzzle (1985)	Dr. Irun Saviz	Rule the world with his army of indestructible robots.	The Chinese agent Tsu-Chai blows up Saviz's factory.	Thrown off of railing by Tsu-Chai.
Data Terror (1986)				
Death in Florence (1986)	Lev Orkin	Pretend a defection to the west so that he could position himself to become a double agent for the KGB against the U.S. military.	Halfway through, his plan goes belly-up when he starts an affair with an Italian actress.	Killed by his wife/secretary, Katya.
Deadly Double (1986)				
Greek Fire (1986)				
Killing Music (1987)				
Spy Traps (1987)				
Deadly Sand (1987)				
The Thirteenth Judge (1987)				
Escape from Vietnam (1987)				
The Immortals (1987)				
Istanbul Intrigue (1987)				

=== Dark Horse Comics ===
==== Story Arcs ====
Storyline	Villain	Objective	Outcome	Fate
Serpent's Tooth	Indigo	Use nuclear warheads stolen from submarines to detonate them underground and cause continental drifts that will flood the earth and destroy human civilization. Thus, allowing him to "wipe the slate clean" and restart civilization with his genetically engineered creatures.	Bond gets into the control room and sabotages the countdown trigger, causing the bombs not to detonate when it reaches zero.	Bond jumpkicks him, causing him to be pushed into an exhibit of a fallen dinosaur skull and fatally pierced by its teeth.
Light of My Death	Amos (Cerberus)			
Shattered Helix	Mister Barclay (Cerberus)	Abduct Professor Boyce and make him lead them to a secret CIA research lab at Antarctica, which contains a deadly mutagen bioweapon	Cerberus reaches the biochemical lab and find two canisters of the mutagen. Both canisters end up ruptured, with Bond setting off the self-destruct of the base, which destroys the mutagen and the research.	Gets caught in the mutagen when Boyce ruptures the first canister to secure James Bond's and Serena Mountjoy's escape.
Minute of Midnight	Lexis			
The Quasimodo Gambit	Maximilian Steel (a.k.a. Quasimodo)			

=== Dynamite Entertainment ===
==== Story Arcs ====
Storyline	Villain	Objective	Outcome	Fate
Vargr	Slaven Kurjak	Further develop his lethal chemical agent by distributing them as recreational drugs for his experiments.	Bond finds out about the plan and escapes Kurjak's death trap. Bond informs British authorities of Kurjak's plan and subsequently destroys Kurjak's base of operations in Norway.	Intercepted by Bond when Kurjak abandons his hideout and swims to the nearby shore. Kurjak is summarily shot by Bond.
Eidolon	Beckett Hawkwood	Prevent the "Hard Rule" from being repealed, preventing Secret Service agents from carrying weapons on British soil; stockpile money and weapons for a SPECTRE re-emergence.	M exposes him as a SPECTRE agent, discrediting him.	Mortally injured from fighting Bond and in no condition to escape the authorities, Hawkwood kills himself by slitting his throat.
Hammerhead	Victoria Hunt (a.k.a. Kraken)	Restore the British Empire to its former glory by using a remote control to hijack HMS Vengeance to fire a nuclear missile to London. The ensuing devastation allows her to establish her own government and rebuilding the country anew.	Believed to have been killed, Bond gets inside Victoria's base and gains control of the Hammerhead Railgun, which he uses to shoot down the nuclear missile fired from HMS Vengeance.	Bond uses the Hammerhead Railgun to kill Victoria.
Black Box	Saga Genji	Using the data gained from the massive online security breach, now stored in his "black box", Genji aims to use the incriminating information to elevate country of Japan into a global leader.	Bond kills Genji and acquires the Black Box, averting global chaos	Genji's final attempt on Bond's life fails, when the latter uses light from a smartphone to reveal Genji's location and throws a knife into Genji's head, killing him.
Kill Chain	The Old Man	Lead SMERSH to a glorious new revolution via a takeover of Europe, disguised as a Neo-Nazi reawakening.	Pulls strings from afar and does not get personally involved; the operations fail.	Survives and never identified by Bond.
Kill Chain	Radkov	Organize the operation to find and kill all enemy spies, including top brass of MI6.	Succeeds in killing agents, but Bond foils the end game.	Throat slit by The Old Man for his failure.
Kill Chain	Rika van de Havik	Betray MI6, assassinate the American Director of National Intelligence, M, and set up operations to take over the Baltics.	Succeeds with in killing Gen. Garrett, and takes over British plane, but foiled by Bond.	Kicked out of a moving aircraft by Bond.
The Body				
James Bond 007	Auric Goldfinger			
Big Things	Mr. Big			
James Bond Origin				
Agent of SPECTRE	Ernst Stavro Blofeld	Use James Bond to contain the internal coup within SPECTRE, being spearheaded by Titania Jones.	Succeeds in killing Titania Jones and retaining control of SPECTRE. He is unsuccessful in trying to kill Bond and Leiter, and he loses Meraki.	Survives, but scarred from the explosion
Agent of SPECTRE	Titania Jones / Number 7	Carry out a coup against Blofeld and gain control of the island stronghold "Meraki."	The coup at Meraki fails and Titania is subdued by Bond.	Shot through the head by Blofeld, after Bond had incapacited her power armor and surrendered to him.
Himeros	Anton Banes	Preserve his global arms dealing business by violently erasing his ties to a sex trafficking ring on a secret island.	Destroys most of the pipeline, but word gets out about his activities, and he sets a bomb to destroy the island and himself.	Bond shoots him and escapes.
Felix Leiter				

==== One-shots ====
Storyline	Villain	Objective	Outcome	Fate
Service	Jack Marshall	Kill United States Secretary of State, Alexander Thomas.	Bond escapes capture and foils the initial assassination plan. Regardless, Marshall is able to acquire a pistol pursue and corner Alexander Thomas. However, Marshall is unable to shoot Thomas due to the pistol being faulty, allowing Bond to prevent the assassination.	Shot by Bond before Marshall regains his aim at Thomas.
Solstice	Anatoly Zima	Use an estranged relative of M, codenamed Solstice, who has become infatuated with Zima, to blackmail M and regain the respect of his former Russian spy masters.	Zima is outmaneuvered by Bond, and brawl in a hotel suite. Bond gains Zima's phone and gives a fraudulent response to make Solstice to break-up on Zima	Zima is unable to overpower Bond and is strangled to death.
Reflections of Death: One Pistol, Three Sliencers	Oscar Ledesma (a.k.a. The Silencer)	Kill Felix Leiter's eldest daughter the night of her prom.	Ledesma gets the drop on Bond, but makes the mistake of challenging him to a duel.	Knifed by Bond.
Reflections of Death: The Hook	Sir Cecil (a.k.a. Architect)	Presumably to shut down the 00 Section, as part of a larger SMERSH operation, using the death of SMERSH assassin Chekhov as a ruse.	Bond waits for him in his apartment, and reveals that Sir Cecil's bodyguard Graves is loyal to MI6.	Shot by Bond.
Reflections of Death: The Rare Dinner	Ivan Turgenev / the Russian Brotherhood	Unknown	Bond systematically eliminates the four gangsters one-by-one in the bathroom, then kitchen, of a 5-star Michelin restaurant.	Knocked out by Agent Craft.
Reflections of Death: The Oddest Job	The Oru organisation	Unknown	Bond and Mr. Lee fight the gang in a karaoke bar.	Eliminated by Bond, Lee and another agent.
Reflections of Death: Men Without a Country	003	Set up a secret prison island base with millions worth of stolen bitcoin as an escape plan from MI6.	Bond escapes the prison without him, believing 003 to be a prisoner; later the prison is raided and Bond realizes his erstwhile ally's plan.	Captured by MI6.

=== Other comics ===
Storyline	Villain	Objective	Outcome	Fate
Permission to Die (by Mike Grell)	Dr. Erik Widziadlo	Fire a nuclear warhead from his ram-tube spacecraft launcher to destroy Victoria, British Columbia in hopes of making mankind understand how dangerous nuclear power is.	Edáine Gayla, who is planning to die with Widziadlo, sabotages the warhead and the missile launcher to destroy Widziadlo's base and operations.	Dies in the base explosion while hugging Gayla.

== Film villains ==
=== Eon Productions ===
Film	Villain	Portrayed by	Objective	Outcome	Status
Dr. No	Dr. No	Joseph Wiseman	Use a nuclear radio beam to topple Cape Canaveral's space program.	Bond disables the radio beam by overloading the nuclear reactor.	Slowly boils to death in the reactor's cooling pond after a struggle with Bond.
From Russia With Love	Colonel Rosa Klebb	Lotte Lenya	Trick James Bond and MI6 into stealing a Soviet decoder machine called the Lektor so they can steal it from them, while also destroying Bond's reputation in a humiliating sex scandal and eventually killing him as revenge for the death of Dr. No.	Bond acquires the device for MI6 and evades SPECTRE's attempts on his life.	Shot in the chest by Tatiana Romanova during an attempt to murder Bond, in the same way Kronsteen was murdered, after her last plan failed.
From Russia With Love	Ernst Stavro Blofeld	Anthony Dawson (body), Eric Pohlmann (voice)	Trick James Bond and MI6 into stealing a Soviet decoder machine called the Lektor so they can steal it from them, while also destroying Bond's reputation in a humiliating sex scandal and eventually killing him as revenge for the death of Dr. No.	Bond acquires the device for MI6 and evades SPECTRE's attempts on his life.	Survives (no contact between him and Bond).
From Russia With Love	Kronsteen	Vladek Sheybal	Trick James Bond and MI6 into stealing a Soviet decoder machine called the Lektor so they can steal it from them, while also destroying Bond's reputation in a humiliating sex scandal and eventually killing him as revenge for the death of Dr. No.	Bond acquires the device for MI6 and evades SPECTRE's attempts on his life.	Murdered by SPECTRE's trainer Morzeny on Blofeld's orders, after his plan to ruin Bond failed, by using a poisoned dagger attached to Morzeny's shoe.
Goldfinger	Auric Goldfinger	Gert Fröbe	Irradiate the gold in Fort Knox with a nuclear weapon (dirty bomb) provided by a Chinese scientist to increase the value of his own gold and cause an economic crisis in the United States on behalf the Chinese government.	Bond kills Odd Job, clearing a way for Felix Leiter to bring an American technician who safely disables the bomb.	Sucked out of a window — accidentally shattered by a gunshot from Goldfinger during a fight with Bond — from a depressurizing plane, falling to his death.
Thunderball	Emilio Largo	Adolfo Celi	Use a woman named Dominique "Domino" Derval as his mistress to reach Domino's brother, François, a french air force pilot, kill François and replace him with a lookalike named Angelo Palazzi to steal two atomic bombs and use them to extort money from various world governments, menacing to detonate the bombs in a major city in the United States and/or the United Kingdom should the governments decide not to pay the ransom of 100 million pounds.	The bombs are recovered and safely destroyed by Bond and the U.S. Coast Guard.	Shot in the back with a harpoon by Domino, avenging her brother's death.
Thunderball	Ernst Stavro Blofeld	Anthony Dawson (body), Eric Pohlmann (voice)	Use a woman named Dominique "Domino" Derval as his mistress to reach Domino's brother, François, a french air force pilot, kill François and replace him with a lookalike named Angelo Palazzi to steal two atomic bombs and use them to extort money from various world governments, menacing to detonate the bombs in a major city in the United States and/or the United Kingdom should the governments decide not to pay the ransom of 100 million pounds.	The bombs are recovered and safely destroyed by Bond and the U.S. Coast Guard.	Survives (no contact between him and Bond).
You Only Live Twice	Ernst Stavro Blofeld	Donald Pleasence	Trigger a war between the United States and Soviet Union, on the behalf of China, by capturing their space capsules midflight.	Bond uses a self-destruct button in Blofeld's lair to destroy the Bird One spacecraft.	Survives, although wounded.
On Her Majesty's Secret Service	Ernst Stavro Blofeld	Telly Savalas	Distribute an infertility-based viral plague to destroy livestock and cereals, unless issued a pardon by the United Nations and the title of count by the College of Arms.	Bond and Marc-Ange Draco destroy the laboratory and radio station from which commands to distribute the viruses are issued. Agents supposedly neutralised.	Survives, despite neck injury. His henchwoman Irma Bunt assassinates Tracy di Vicenzo, Bond's newly married wife, on their honeymoon.
Diamonds Are Forever	Ernst Stavro Blofeld	Charles Gray	Steal diamonds to fabricate a laser satellite which can remotely detonate nuclear stockpiles, then use said laser to extort the world's nuclear powers.	Bond smashes Blofeld's mini-sub against the control room of his lair, disabling the satellite and causing severe damage to his lair.	Survived the fiery demolition of the control room of his oil rig headquarters as he returns in the opening of For Your Eyes Only, where Bond drops him down an industrial chimney.
Live and Let Die	Dr. Kananga / Mr. Big	Yaphet Kotto	Distribute a large cache of heroin into the United States without cost, driving his competitors out of business and gaining a monopoly.	Quarrel Jr. destroys Kananga's poppy fields with a series of explosives.	Forced by Bond to ingest a compressed gas pellet, causing him to inflate and explode.
The Man with the Golden Gun	Francisco Scaramanga	Christopher Lee	Kill James Bond (as he is the only one Scaramanga considers his equal) and sell the Solex Agitator, a device that can harness solar energy for destructive purposes.	Bond retrieves the Agitator for MI6 and defeats Scaramanga in mortal combat.	Shot in the chest by Bond during their duel. Is the only kill made by Bond in the entire film.
The Spy Who Loved Me	Karl Stromberg	Curd Jürgens	Capture a British submarine and a Soviet submarine and use them to trick Britain and the USSR into starting a nuclear war. Once the world's population has been decimated, repopulate the Earth with a new society under his control formed in secret bases under the ocean.	Bond redirects the British and Soviet nuclear missiles' coordinates so that the missile fired by each sub hits the other, destroying them.	Shot repeatedly by Bond using his own dinner table booby trap.
Moonraker	Hugo Drax	Michael Lonsdale	Fire a nerve agent from space, poisoning Earth's atmosphere and killing off the human population. Rebuild humanity in space with carefully selected humans.	The space station containing the poisonous globes is destroyed by US Marines, and the three globes that were launched are destroyed by Bond and Holly Goodhead.	Shot with a cyanide dart by Bond and ejected into outer space.
For Your Eyes Only	Aristotle Kristatos	Julian Glover	Retrieve an ATAC missile command system lost by the British in a shipwreck and sell it to the Soviet Union. Additionally, trick Bond and MI6 into killing his main rival, Milos Columbo.	Bond joins forces with Melina Havelock and Milos Columbo, infiltrating Kristatos's hideout to retrieve the ATAC. However, after Kristatos' death, Bond is forced to throw the device off a cliff to prevent KGB's General Anatoly Gogol from taking possession of it.	Stabbed in the back with a knife thrown by Columbo.
Octopussy	Kamal Khan	Louis Jourdan	Execute General Orlov's plan in exchange for being paid in jewels stolen from the Kremlin.	The jewels are recovered by the KGB.	Attempts to escape in his plane, but Bond disables the left engine of the plane, causing Khan to crash it into a mountain, killing him.
Octopussy	General Orlov	Steven Berkoff	Smuggle a nuclear warhead onto a US Air Force Base in West Germany and detonate it to clear a path for the Soviet Bloc to conquer Western Europe against the pacifist proposals of General Gogol.	Bond, with the help of Octopussy, disarms the bomb.	Shot by guards who believe that he is trying to defect. Died smiling at the feet of General Gogol, who labeled him as a common thief and a disgrace.
A View to a Kill	Max Zorin	Christopher Walken	Trigger an earthquake along the San Andreas fault to destroy Silicon Valley, thus wiping out his competitors in the microchip market and giving him a monopoly.	Zorin leaves May Day to die. Enraged and betrayed, she betrays Zorin back by smuggling the bomb out of the blast radius, sacrificing herself.	Falls from the top of the Golden Gate Bridge during a fight with Bond.
The Living Daylights	General Georgi Koskov	Jeroen Krabbé	Fake a defection and trick MI6 into killing his rival, General Leonid Pushkin, to cover-up his weapon smuggling racket, which Pushkin was investigating.	Bond and Pushkin fake the latter's assassination and Bond destroys the shipment of opium that Koskov was going to use to buy weapons from Whitaker.	Arrested by Pushkin; implied to be executed by the Soviet government, off-screen.
The Living Daylights	Brad Whitaker	Joe Don Baker	Engage in a triangle deal with Koskov and the Mujahadeen, where Whitaker will get valuable opium in exchange for high-tech weapons.	Bond destroys the shipment of opium, ruining the deal.	Bond activates a bomb disguised as a key chain, dropping a bust of the Duke of Wellington on Whitaker, crushing him.
Licence to Kill	Franz Sanchez	Robert Davi	Smuggle a large shipment of cocaine into Asia by dissolving the substance in petrol.	Bond destroys the refinery used to dissolve the cocaine and later the four tankers that are already filled.	Bond sets Sanchez, who is soaked in gasoline due to a tanker crash, on fire with a lighter gifted by Felix Leiter and Leiter's wife Delia (thus, avenging the severe wounds received from the former and the murder of the latter on their honeymoon). Burning Sanchez stumbles into a leaking tank truck, causing the leaked gasoline to catch on fire and make the tanker explode, killing Sanchez.
GoldenEye	Alec Trevelyan / 'Janus'	Sean Bean	Use an EMP weapon called GoldenEye to destroy London's economy in revenge for British repatriation of Lienz Cossacks which led to the murder-suicide of his parents. Also aims to eliminate Severnaya survivor Natalya Simonova, before she becomes too much trouble.	Simonova reprograms the GoldenEye satellite's controls to initiate atmospheric re-entry, thus destroying itself. Bond sabotages the dish's antenna by jamming its gears, rendering Boris Grishenko incapable of undoing Simomova's work.	Bond drops Alec to the bottom of the dish surface, and subsequently ends crushed by the antenna's collapsing beam steering mechanism.
Tomorrow Never Dies	Elliot Carver	Jonathan Pryce	Cause a war between the UK and China by firing a cruise missile from a sunken British warship towards Beijing, both so he can arrange a broadcasting deal with a new Chinese government and so that his media empire will have more news to cover.	Bond destroys Carver's stealth boat in a massive explosion, destroying the missile before it can launch.	Bond incapacitates Carver and leaves him in the path of his own Sea-Vac drill, which shreds him to pieces.
The World Is Not Enough	Elektra King	Sophie Marceau	Gain a monopoly on crude oil in Europe by setting off a nuclear explosion in Istanbul, rendering the Bosporus Strait impassable to tankers carrying oil from competing pipelines. Also murder M in retaliation for ordering her father Sir Robert King to not pay the ransom after her kidnapping.	Bond kills her and then stops the detonation of the submarine.	Shot in the chest by Bond after she refused to order Renard to surrender.
The World Is Not Enough	Victor 'Renard' Zokas	Robert Carlyle	Detonate a nuclear submarine in the waters of Istanbul to serve Elektra's plan.	Bond kills him before he can overload the submarine's reactor.	Impaled by a plutonium rod, shot out of the sub's reactor core at high speed, by Bond.
Die Another Day	Gustav Graves / Colonel Tan-Sun Moon	Toby Stephens / Will Yun Lee	Use the sun-enhancing satellite Icarus to cut a path through the Korean Demilitarized Zone, provoking a war between North and South Korea.	Icarus is rendered harmless when Bond destroys the control device.	Bond pulls the cord on his parachute, sucking him out of plane, electrocutes him with Grave's own armor and finally getting sucked into the plane's engine, ripping him to shreds.
Casino Royale	Le Chiffre	Mads Mikkelsen	Recoup his clients' squandered funds by winning a poker tournament at the Casino Royale.	Bond wins the tournament.	Shot in the forehead by Mr. White.
Casino Royale	Mr. White	Jesper Christensen	Assassinate Le Chiffre and steal back the money.	Succeeds.	Arrested by Bond.
Quantum of Solace	Dominic Greene	Mathieu Amalric	Carry out a coup d'état in Bolivia and install his puppet ruler, General Medrano, in exchange for land hiding a massively valuable, undiscovered aquifer. Then sell the new Bolivian government water from the aquifer at massively inflated prices.	Bond intercepts Greene and Medrano before they can carry out the coup.	Bond abandons him in the middle of the Bolivian desert, with nothing but a can of motor oil to drink. He is later reported to have been shot by an anonymous assassin after drinking the oil.
Quantum of Solace	Mr. White	Jesper Christensen	Escape MI6 custody.	Succeeds.	Survives (returns in Spectre where he is dying from thallium poisoning and commits suicide using Bond's Walther PPK).
Skyfall	Raoul Silva	Javier Bardem	Take revenge on M by launching a massive cyberattack on MI6 and then personally carry out her assassination.	Indirectly succeeds. Bond foils his first assassination attempt, but later she is fatally wounded by one of his henchmen. (Although, he does not live to realize this or find the closure he sought.)	Bond throws a hunting knife into his back.
Spectre	Franz Oberhauser / Ernst Stavro Blofeld	Christoph Waltz	Gain control of a global surveillance program called "Nine Eyes".	Bond destroys Blofeld's data center and Q prevents the Nine Eyes program from being activated.	Arrested by M after he survives his escape helicopter being shot down by Bond.
Spectre	Max Denbigh / C	Andrew Scott	Gain control of a global surveillance program called "Nine Eyes".	Bond destroys Blofeld's data center and Q prevents the Nine Eyes program from being activated.	Engages in a fight with M and falls to his death.
No Time to Die	Lyutsifer Safin	Rami Malek	Wipe out SPECTRE using "Heracles" – a DNA-based bioweapon stolen from MI6, as revenge for the assassination of his family. Then sell the weapon worldwide, creating a new world order.	Succeeds in wiping out SPECTRE but fails to spread Heracles worldwide due to the Royal Navy's and Bond's intervention, which destroys the facility producing it.	Shot by Bond after a brief fistfight but not before wounding and infecting Bond with Heracles, leading to his own death.
No Time to Die	Ernst Stavro Blofeld	Christoph Waltz	Escape prison, restore SPECTRE, and eliminate Bond using Heracles.	Safin uses Heracles to wipe out SPECTRE in Cuba and later coerces Madeleine Swann into killing Blofeld with it.	Inadvertently infected with Heracles when Bond briefly touches and strangles him—after he touched Swann—during an interrogation and dies as a result.

=== Non-Eon ===
Film	Villain	Portrayed by	Objective	Outcome	Fate
Casino Royale (1954 TV episode)	Le Chiffre	Peter Lorre	Escape bankruptcy with baccarat game.	Loses to Bond.	Shot by Bond.
Casino Royale (1967 film)	Dr. Noah/Jimmy Bond	Woody Allen	Use biological warfare to make all women beautiful, then wipe out all men bigger than him to make him get the girls.	Poisoned by The Detainer with his own atomic pill.	Blown up by pill.
Casino Royale (1967 film)	Le Chiffre	Orson Welles	Recover embezzled SMERSH funds in baccarat game.	Loses game to Evelyn Tremble.	Shot by SMERSH agents inside of a video screen.
Never Say Never Again	Maximillian Largo	Klaus Maria Brandauer	Hold world powers for ransom with nuclear weapons.	The weapons are retrieved by Bond.	Shot in the back with harpoon by Domino Petachi.
Never Say Never Again	Ernst Stavro Blofeld	Max von Sydow	Hold world powers for ransom with nuclear weapons.	The weapons are retrieved by Bond.	Survives (no contact between him and Bond).

== Video game villains ==
Following is a list of main villains in James Bond computer and video games.

Game	Villain	Portrayed by	Objective	Outcome	Fate
GoldenEye 007	Alec Trevelyan	Sean Bean (likeness)	Use GoldenEye to rob and destroy London.	Bond destroys Goldeneye's controls.	After Trevelyan withdraws to a small platform at the bottom of the antenna's azimuth arm, the player can kill him the way they see fit. Bonus scene is shown if the player manages to force him off the platform.
Tomorrow Never Dies	Elliot Carver	Jonathan Pryce (likeness); Andrew Burt (voice)	Fire a nuclear missile at Beijing, eliminating the current Chinese government in favour of politicians who will grant him exclusive broadcasting rights in China.	Bond aborts the missile launch.	Shot and killed by Bond.
James Bond 007	General Golgov	N/A	Use a nuclear holocaust to emerge as the ruler of the world.	Bond destroys Golgov's robot with a bazooka.	Dies in the explosion.
The World is Not Enough	Elektra King	Sophie Marceau (likeness) Sumalee Montano (voice)	Kill her father Sir Robert King to take over his oil business, and then destroy İstanbul in a nuclear explosion to monopolise the oil market.	Succeeds in killing Sir King; however, Bond escapes captivity at Maiden's Tower and boards the nuclear submarine.	Shot and killed by Bond.
The World is Not Enough	Renard	Robert Carlyle (likeness); David Robb (voice)	Overload the reactor of a nuclear submarine to generate a nuclear explosion, destroying Istanbul and increasing the value of Elektra's oil.	Bond stops Renard from blowing up the nuclear submarine.	Impaled by a plutonium rod shot out of the sub's core at high speed by Bond.
007 Racing	Dr. Hammond Litte	Tim Bentinck	Smuggle stolen NATO warheads to terrorists via his automobile line, then later commit genocide using a deadly virus.	His smuggling operation is dissolved by Bond, and the plane carrying the virus is destroyed.	Presumably killed when Bond blows up his plane.
Agent Under Fire	Adrian Malprave	Corina Harmon	Kidnap the world trade leaders, create clones, kill the G8, then force the clones to give her control of the world.	Bond destroys her cloning lab and kills the clones.	Dies when headquarters explodes.
Nightfire	Rafael Drake	Michael Ensign	Destroy NATO forces in a massive air strike from space using a hijacked United States Space Defence Platform, allowing him to take over the world.	Bond disables the missiles' targeting systems, sending them off course.	Shot with a laser by Bond.
Everything or Nothing	Nikolai Diavolo	Willem Dafoe	Take over Russia and the world by using a metal-eating nanobot army, then get revenge on Bond for the death of his mentor Max Zorin.	Bond destroys the nanobots.	Falls into a missile silo after Bond shoots Diavolo's control tower with a rocket launcher.
GoldenEye: Rogue Agent	Auric Goldfinger	Gert Fröbe (likeness); Enn Reitel (voice).	Use the OMEN virus to take over the world.	Goldeneye uses the OMEN virus against Goldfinger's forces.	Destroyed by the OMEN virus set off by Goldeneye.
GoldenEye: Rogue Agent	Dr. Julius No	Joseph Wiseman (likeness); Carlos Alazraqui (voice).	Use the OMEN virus to take over the world.	Goldeneye uses the OMEN virus against Goldfinger's forces.	Electrocuted in his own reactor.
GoldenEye: Rogue Agent	Number 1	Donald Pleasence (likeness); Gideon Emery (voice).	Manipulate Goldeneye into killing off his two liabilities, Dr. No and Goldfinger.	Succeeds.	Survives, no contact with GoldenEye.
GoldenEye: Rogue Agent	Francisco Scaramanga	Christopher Lee (likeness and voice).	Manipulate Goldeneye into killing off his two liabilities, Dr. No and Goldfinger.	Succeeds.	Survives, no contact with GoldenEye.
From Russia with Love	Rosa Klebb	Lotte Lenya (likeness); Karly Rothenberg (voice)	Kill Bond and obtain the Lektor.	Bond survives and gets the Lektor to MI6.	Shot in the chest by Tatiana Romanova.
From Russia with Love	Donald 'Red' Grant	Robert Shaw (likeness); Brian McCole (voice)	Kill Bond and obtain the Lektor.	Bond survives and gets the Lektor to MI6.	Bond shoots him with a Wright Magnum. OCTOPUS is believed to have fallen apart afterwards.
Quantum of Solace	Dominic Greene	Mathieu Amalric (likeness and voice).	Stage a coup d'état in Bolivia, to gain control of a piece of land rich in resources.	Camille Montes kills General Medrano (Greene's associate, who will execute the plan), and Bill Tanner, using hacking, bankrupts Greene, nullifying all of his efforts.	Killed in the gunfight by Bond.
GoldenEye 007 (2010 remake)	Alec Trevelyan	Elliot Cowan	Use GoldenEye to rob and destroy London, as punishment for their greed.	Bond destroys GoldenEye's controls.	Falls to his death after Bond shoots him.
Blood Stone	Stefan Pomerov	Laurentio Passa	Weaponise an antidote for smallpox and anthrax, then release it upon the world.	Bond blows up his factory, then prevents his plane from releasing the toxin.	Blown out of his plane after Bond shoots the door open.
Blood Stone	Rak	James Goode	Aid in the kidnapping of scientists and sell their research.	Killed by Bond.	Shot by Bond, causing him to fire a rocket at his plane, which thus explodes, killing him.
Blood Stone	Nicole Hunter	Joss Stone	Organise the kidnapping of scientists.	Bond discovers her connection with the kidnapping plot and chases after her.	Shot by an unmanned drone controlled by her "boss" (implied to be Ernst Stavro Blofeld following the release of Spectre).
007 Legends	Auric Goldfinger	Gert Fröbe (likeness); Timothy Watson (voice)	Irradiate the gold supply of Fort Knox with a bomb.	The bomb is disabled.	Blown out of plane window.
007 Legends	Ernst Stavro Blofeld	Glenn Wrage	Blackmail the UN with the threat of a deadly virus that will wipe out all livestock and cereals.	The base is destroyed by Bond.	Thrown out of cable car by Bond and presumed dead. Later fires at James Bond and his wife, Tracy Bond, in an act of revenge, killing the latter.
007 Legends	Franz Sanchez	Robert Davi	Smuggle drugs in Asia.	The shipment is attacked by Bond.	Set on fire by Bond and burns to death.
007 Legends	Gustav Graves	Toby Stephens	Invade South Korea using the Icarus.	Icarus is disabled.	Sucked into plane engine.
007 Legends	Hugo Drax	Michael Lonsdale	Kill the entire human race, then rebuild humanity in outer space.	The space station is destroyed by Bond.	Blown out of airlock and suffocated.
007 Legends	Patrice	Ola Rapace	Kill MI6 agents in İstanbul, and assassinate a man in Shanghai.	Succeeds, but is killed by Bond.	Dropped off of a skyscraper by Bond.
007 First Light	Sir Nicholas Webb	Anthony Howell	Cover up the mistakes of AI THEIA; replace the British government using its sibling, HYPERION.	Bond and Isola Vale remove both machines' cores.	Shot by Vale.
007 First Light	Damien Webb	Bart Edwards	Cover up the mistakes of AI THEIA; replace the British government using its sibling, HYPERION.	Bond and Isola Vale remove both machines' cores.	Drowned by Bond.

== Villainous organisations ==
- SMERSH – SMiERt SHpionam, "Death to Spies", James Bond's original nemesis in the novels, though only taking an active role in the 1954 TV film, 1967 film Casino Royale and only briefly mentioned in the others (apparently disbanded 20 years before the events of The Living Daylights). The Soviet agency is in charge of assassination, loosely based on the real-life SMERSH.
- SPECTRE – SPecial Executive for Counter-intelligence, Terrorism, Revenge and Extortion, first appeared in the novel Thunderball and replaced SMERSH as Bond's nemesis in the films. The independent terrorist organisation is headed by Ernst Stavro Blofeld. In the 2015 film, Spectre, 007 digs deep into the organisation and tries to get payback for the murder of M (Judi Dench); he discovers the organisation is headed by his adopted brother Franz Oberhauser, now calling himself Blofeld (Christoph Waltz), and that its entire purpose was to personally persecute Bond himself.
- The Spangled Mob – Bond's enemy in the novel Diamonds Are Forever, appearing also in Goldfinger and The Man with the Golden Gun. The mob is an American Mafia family based in Las Vegas.
- Drax Metals – Hugo Drax's metal company in Moonraker, renamed "Drax Industries" in the film, where it specialises in Space Shuttle-like spacecraft.
- Stromberg Shipping Line – Karl Stromberg (Curd Jürgens)' organisation in The Spy Who Loved Me. As well as operating the titular shipping line, it features its own line of laboratories.
- Zorin Enterprises – Max Zorin (Christopher Walken)'s multinational conglomerate, operating in computer hardware and mining, in A View to a Kill.
- Entreprises Auric A.G. – Auric Goldfinger (Gert Fröbe)'s organisation in Goldfinger. Divisions include a stud farm in Kentucky named "Auric Stud".
- KGB – Soviet intelligence agency.
- Janus Syndicate – Alec Trevelyan (Sean Bean)'s vehemently anti-British terrorist organisation in GoldenEye.
- CMGN – Carver Media Group Network, Elliot Carver (Jonathan Pryce)'s self-made mass media empire in Tomorrow Never Dies.
- The Scales of Justice – A movement in John Gardner's The Man from Barbarossa.
- Yakuza – Japanese crime gang in the novel The Man with the Red Tattoo.
- COLD – The Children of Last Days, a terrorist organisation that Bond faces in the novel COLD.
- The Union – A villainous organisation in Raymond Benson's novels High Time to Kill, DoubleShot, and Never Dream of Dying.
- OCTOPUS – Replaces SPECTRE in the video game From Russia with Love (an adaptation of the 1963 film) for copyright reasons.
- BAST – The Brotherhood of Anarchy and Secret Terrorism, featured in the novel Win, Lose or Die.
- Quantum – A shadowy criminal organisation seen in Casino Royale and Quantum of Solace. The organisation is strictly apolitical—but with considerable political influence of their own—and will deal with anyone whose interests converge with their own. Known members of the organisation include an extensive network of current and former politicians, business people and intelligence agents. One of their leading members, Dominic Greene (Mathieu Amalric), leads a cover organisation called Greene Planet. In Spectre (2015), the organisation is revealed as a division within Spectre, rather than an independent group.
- SCUM – Stands for "Saboteurs and Criminals United in Mayhem", the main villainous organisation in the James Bond Jr. series.
- TAROT – Technological Accession, Revenge and Organized Terror, the replacement for SPECTRE in the James Bond 007 roleplaying Game produced by Victory Games from 1983 to 1987.
- Phoenix International – Rafael Drake (Michael Ensign)'s organisation in Nightfire. Ostensibly a nuclear disposal company, Drake used it to weaponise the nuclear materials it got its hands on in his plan to rule the world.
- King Industries – Sir Robert King (David Calder)'s multinational oil and construction company in The World Is Not Enough and its novelisation and video game adaptations. It was formed through the merge of his own construction business and his wife's oil business.
- Osato Chemicals and Engineering – Mr. Osato (Teru Shimada)'s company, supplying chemicals and engineering equipment in You Only Live Twice, heavily affiliated with SPECTRE.
- Graves Corporation – Gustav Graves (Toby Stephens)' diamond-mining business in Die Another Day.
- Greene Planet – Dominic Greene (Mathieu Amalric)'s environmentalist organisation in Quantum of Solace. Really a front for the operations of Quantum, and by extension, Spectre.
- Sanchez Cartel – drug cartel run by Franz Sanchez (Robert Davi) in Licence to Kill, operating in both Americas and hiding behind many front organisations.
- Rahani Electronics – major electronics company mentioned in Role of Honour and Nobody Lives for Ever, owned by SPECTRE commander Tamil Rahani, and possibly used by SPECTRE as a front.
- Rattenfänger – paramilitary organization that engages in terrorism in exchange for money, in Double or Nothing, A Spy Like Me, and Hurricane Room. Later revealed to be a successor organisation to SMERSH.
- Stalnaya Ruka – roughly translated to "Steel Hand", a successor organisation to SMERSH seeking to overthrow and replace Nikita Khrushchev with a hardline Communist leader more in line with Stalin's ideology.
- Webb Industries – Sir Nicholas Webb (Anthony Howell)'s company. An arms manufacturer turned tech giant that specializes in cutting-edge AI.

== See also ==
- Outline of James Bond
