= Rosie Dixon – Night Nurse =

1978 British film by Justin Cartwright

Rose Dixon – Night Nurse
- Directed by: Justin Cartwright
- Written by: Christopher Wood; Justin Cartwright
- Based on: Confessions of a Night Nurse by Christopher Wood
- Produced by: Frank Bevis
- Starring: Beryl Reid; John Le Mesurier; Arthur Askey; Debbie Ash
- Cinematography: Alex Thomson
- Edited by: Geoffrey Foot
- Music by: Ed Welch
- Production company: Columbia Pictures
- Distributed by: Columbia-Warner Distributors
- Release date: 19 February 1978
- Running time: 90 minutes
- Country: United Kingdom
- Language: English
- Budget: £300,000

Rosie Dixon – Night Nurse is a 1978 British sex comedy film directed by Justin Cartwright and starring Debbie Ash, Carolyne Argyle, Beryl Reid and John Le Mesurier. It was written by Christopher Wood and Cartwright based on the 1974 novel Confessions of a Night Nurse by Wood (under the pseudonym Rosie Dixon). It was shot at Elstree Studios in Hertfordshire and made and released by Columbia Pictures.

The film is one of several softcore sex comedies released in the 1970s to cash in on the success of the Confessions series (also written by Wood under the pseudonym Timothy Lea). It is the only one of the nine Rosie Dixon novels to be adapted into a movie. The character of Penny Sutton – Rosie's best friend in the film and in the books – is the star of an earlier series of similar novels that depict Penny as an airline stewardess.

Debbie Ash was a member of the dance troupe Hot Gossip. Her sister Leslie Ash plays Rosie's sister Natalie.

== Plot ==
A new student nurse at a hospital attracts interest from the staff with hilarious consequences.

== Cast ==
- Beryl Reid as matron
- John Le Mesurier as Sir Archibald MacGregor
- Arthur Askey as Mr. Arkwright
- Debbie Ash as Rosie Dixon
- Liz Fraser as Mrs. Dixon
- Lance Percival as Jake Fletcher
- John Junkin as Mr. Dixon
- Bob Todd as Mr. Buchanan
- Carolyne Argyle as Penny Green
- Jeremy Sinden as Dr. Robert Fishlock
- Christopher Ellison as Dr. Adam Quint
- Peter Mantle as Dr. Tom Richmond
- Ian Sharp as Dr. Seamus MacSweeney
- Leslie Ash as Natalie Dixon
- David Timson as Geoffrey Ramsbottom
- John Clive as Grieves
- Patricia Hodge as Sister Belter
- Peter Bull as August visitor
- Glenna Forster-Jones as Staff Nurse Smythe
- Harry Towb as Mr. Phillips
- Joan Benham as Sister Tutor
- Sara Pugsley as night sister
- Jon Lingard-Lane as traction patient / Barnabus Medic
- Claire Davenport as Mrs. Buchanan

== Reception ==
The Monthly Film Bulletin wrote: "This basic hospital comedy closely follows the minimal lines of scriptwriter Christopher Wood's Confessions movies. Characterisation – or rather caricature – is of the crudest variety and the narrative only just strong enough to support a string of antique situations long since drained of the little humour they may once have contained. Now that nudity – rather decorously rendered here – has become part of the stock in trade of this sort of comedy, the fusillade of innuendos which formerly provided slight if incidental pleasure seems to have been abandoned in favour of cartoon-style exaggeration: thus, a writhing couple cause their vibrating bed to explode. The lack of exuberant ensemble playing is the film's most telling fault."

The Radio Times Guide to Films gave the film 1/5 stars, writing: "It should give you some idea of the mire into which the British film industry had plunged itself during the 1970s when you read such names as Beryl Reid, John Le Mesurier and Liz Fraser on the cast list of this bawdy hospital comedy. Debbie Ash (sister of Leslie) suffers countless indignities in the title role, but it's Arthur Askey who stoops the lowest, as he resorts to pinching uniformed bottoms to get the cheapest of laughs."

Time Out wrote: "Christopher Wood's screenplay is stamped with the Gold Seal of the Ancient Order of Most-Elementary British Scriptwriters. This string of charmless high-jinks is naturally set in a hospital: Bob Todd malingers without his dentures; John Le Mesurier, an absent-minded consultant, dithers over the racing pages; Arthur Askey pinches bums; a quartet of bibulous junior doctors attempt to tumble our vacuous heroine. Come back, James Robertson Justice."

Marjorie Bilbow wrote in Screen International: "The little gems of comedy character acting provided by the experienced stars add sparkle to the dull predictability of a mini-episodic story which never approaches the manic nonsense of a Carry On. Only lan Sharp as the lecherous Irish doctor gets near to achieving the precision of timing with which the older actors make mediocre dialogue seem very funny. The film will get by because there are plenty of pretty girls who seldom stay fully dressed, and the established stars are sufficiently numerous to make the regrettable brevity of their scenes less noticeable. But I fear that any laughter provoked by individual scenes or lines will not be as prolonged as it should be because scenes are intercut so tightly that payoffs fall flat."

In Doing Rude Things, David McGillivray described the film as "a plotless string of medical gags and bonking."
