= Justin Cartwright =

British novelist (1943–2018)

Justin Cartwright MBE FRSL
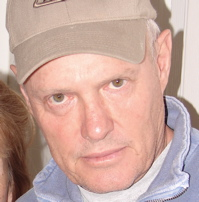
- Born: Justin James Cartwright; 20 May 1943; Cape Town, Cape Province, Union of South Africa
- Died: 3 December 2018 (aged 75)
- Occupations: Novelist, Director, Journalist

Justin James Cartwright MBE FRSL (20 May 1943 – 3 December 2018) was a British novelist, originally from South Africa.

== Biography ==
Cartwright was born in Cape Town, South Africa, but grew up in Johannesburg where his father was the editor of the Rand Daily Mail newspaper. He was educated in South Africa, the United States and at Trinity College, Oxford. Cartwright worked in advertising and directed documentaries, films and television commercials. He managed election broadcasts, first for the Liberal Party and then the SDP-Liberal Alliance during the 1979, 1983 and 1987 British general elections. For his work on election broadcasts, Cartwright was appointed an MBE.

Australian Broadcasting Corporation presenter Ramona Koval described Cartwright's novels as being "based in contemporary settings but he’s able to suffuse them with the big questions that haunt us". Three of Cartwright's early novels feature a character named Timothy Curtiz, named partly for Kurtz from Joseph Conrad's Heart of Darkness, and partly for Cartwright's own brother. In Interior, Curtiz is in Africa investigating the disappearance of his father in 1959 while on a trip for National Geographic. In Look at It This Way, Curtiz is a columnist for Manhattan magazine while he is living in London, has a daughter named Gemma, and by the end of the novel has a partner named Victoria. In Masai Dreaming, Curtiz is in Africa researching a film about Claudia Cohn-Casson, and his relationship with Victoria is having "complications." Look at It This Way was made into a three-part, 180-minutes drama by the BBC in 1992, starring Kristin Scott Thomas; Cartwright wrote the screenplay.

In Every Face I Meet was shortlisted for both the Booker Prize and the Whitbread Novel Award in 1995, and won a Commonwealth Writers Prize; Leading the Cheers won the Whitbread Novel Award in 1998; White Lightning was shortlisted for the Whitbread Novel Award in 2002. Masai Dreaming won the South African M-Net Literary Awards.

The Promise of Happiness was chosen as one of Richard and Judy's Book Club's titles for 2005 and was the winner of the 2005 Hawthornden Prize and the Sunday Times Fiction Prize of South Africa.

Cartwright lived in London with his wife, Penny, and two sons.

== Bibliography ==
=== Novels ===
- Deep Six (1972)
- Fighting Men (1977)
- Horse of Darius (1980) ISBN 0-440-13761-6
- Freedom for the Wolves (1983)
- Interior (1988) ISBN 0-679-40866-5
- Look at it This Way (1990) ISBN 0-333-54831-0
- Masai Dreaming (1993) ISBN 0-333-59281-6
- In Every Face I Meet (1995) ISBN 0-340-63782-X
- Leading the Cheers (1998) ISBN 0-340-63784-6
- Half in Love (2001) ISBN 0-340-76629-8
- White Lightning (2002) ISBN 0-340-82174-4
- The Promise of Happiness (2005) ISBN 0-312-34880-0
- The Song Before it is Sung (2007)
- To Heaven by Water (2009)
- Other People's Money (2011) ISBN 1-408-81413-7
- Lion Heart (2013) ISBN 9781408839799
- Up Against the Night (2015)

=== Non-fiction ===
- Not Yet Home (1997) ISBN 1-85702-526-1
- This Secret Garden (2008) ISBN 0-7475-7961-X
- Oxford Revisited (2008) ISBN 1-59691-093-3

=== Films ===
- Rosie Dixon – Night Nurse (1978) sex comedy
- Look at It This Way (1992) TV mini-series (novel and adaptation)
- Q.E.D. (producer) (1 episode, 1983)
