= Christopher Wood (writer) =

English writer (1935–2015)

- Born: Christopher Hovelle Wood; 5 November 1935; Lambeth, London, England
- Died: 9 May 2015 (aged 79); France
- Other name: Timothy Lea
- Occupations: Screenwriter, novelist
- Years active: 1969–2015
- Spouse: Jane Patrick
- Children: 3

Christopher Hovelle Wood (5 November 1935 – 9 May 2015) was an English screenwriter and novelist, best known for the Confessions series of novels and films which he wrote as Timothy Lea. Under his own name, he adapted two James Bond novels for the screen: The Spy Who Loved Me (1977, with Richard Maibaum) and Moonraker (1979).

Wood's many novels divide into four groups: semi-autobiographical literary fiction, historical fiction, adventure novels, and pseudonymous humorous erotica.

== Life and career ==
=== Family ===
Christopher Wood was born in the London borough of Lambeth, son of Walter Leonard Wood and Audrey Maud, née Hovell. Wood had three children, one of whom is film producer and literary agent Caroline Wood.

Wood died at his apartment in southwest France on 9 May 2015, and was survived by his son and daughter. His death was not widely known until Sir Roger Moore paid tribute to him later that year on Twitter on 17 October.

=== Education, military experience and writing career ===
Wood's parents sent their son to board at Edward VI Grammar School in Norwich to protect him from The Blitz. The Baedeker Blitz of April 1942 saw the adjacent medieval school bombed into rubble. Wood continued his education at King's College Junior School in London where he found himself at risk from "drunken, mentally disturbed, sexual predators" among the staff.

Wood graduated from Peterhouse at Cambridge University in 1960 with degrees in economics and law. He did his mandatory military service in Cyprus, which inspired his second novel Terrible Hard, Says Alice. Novelist and fellow future Bond writer William Boyd praised the book, citing it as one of the few convincing examples of accounts of war alongside Ernest Hemingway's A Farewell to Arms and Joseph Heller's Catch-22.

Wood's African experiences inspired two novels: his first, Make it Happen to Me and his adventure novel A Dove Against Death (1983). Of A Dove Against Death, he recalled, "I was helping to conduct a plebiscite in the Southern Cameroons under UN supervision in 1960. An old man came out of a hut wearing what at first glance I thought was a brass coal scuttle. Then I realized that it was German helmet with a spike on it. My interest began then. Many years later came the story." After considerable research, Wood discovered records of a Dove that was sent to south-west Africa and a wireless station in Togoland that the Germans built and the British destroyed, all of which he wove together to create the novel.

Wood became an account executive at the advertising agency Masius Wynne-Williams where he managed national brands. Like his Masius colleague Desmond Skirrow, Wood used the daily train commutes between his Royston home and London to write his first several books.

After unsuccessful attempts submitting scripts for television, Wood wrote his first novel which he entitled Nobody Here But Us Pickens. The publishers retitled it Make it Happen to Me. Sales were poor and the book was subsequently withdrawn after a threatened defamation lawsuit.

Wood pitched the idea of a series of erotic comic novels to his publishers at Sphere paperbacks. The first of these books, Confessions of a Window Cleaner, went through multiple editions.

With the success of the Confessions books, Wood quit his job at Masius – despite his father's stringent objections – to write full-time. Wood and his family subsequently moved to France.

Wood intended to continue writing literary fiction, but found the demands on his time too great. He reluctantly decided that "serious writing" would have to wait while the Confessions books were selling. Among projects that were put aside include a tell-all novel about the advertising world.

Critic Richard Newman in Books and Bookmen considered this dichotomy in his review of Wood's historical novel John Adam – Samurai. "I just can't make up my mind about John Adam – Samurai – or, for that matter, its author, Christopher Wood. As a piece of sheer escapism, it's fantastic: it's got just the right amount of tongue-in-cheek cheekiness. My problem is — did he write it as a piece of cerebral fantasy to escape from the frustration of weekdays spent in a London advertising agency (in which case, bully for him); or does he want to be taken as a 'serious' author. To me, however, it's as if all the fantasies of this London advertising man [...] had, at the advanced age of 36, broken out into a cold sweat. Psychiatrists tell us we should shed our fantasies by the time we reach our mid-thirties, so perhaps Christopher Wood is doing just that. And yet, underlying it all, one feels that he has done his homework and knows his Samurai very well. And he really makes you think you are watching it all. Qualities like this are worth developing. His is the imagination which could come up with something really good."

=== Confessions, and other pseudonymous works ===
Wood was also responsible for the Confessions series of novels and their film adaptations, written under the pseudonym Timothy Lea. They are Confessions of a Window Cleaner, Confessions of a Driving Instructor, Confessions from a Holiday Camp, Confessions from a Hotel, Confessions of a Travelling Salesman, Confessions of a Film Extra, Confessions from the Clink, Confessions of a Private Soldier, Confessions from the Pop Scene (adapted into the movie Confessions of a Pop Performer), Confessions from a Health Farm, Confessions from the Shop Floor, Confessions of a Long Distance Lorry Driver, Confessions of a Plumber's Mate, Confessions of a Private Dick, Confessions from a Luxury Liner, Confessions from a Nudist Colony, Confessions of a Milkman, Confessions of an Ice Cream Man and Confessions from a Haunted House. Wood told an interviewer for The Independent in 2013: "The books, and later the films, got terrible reviews, but they were successful, and success was its own currency".

Wood told Penthouse that each Confessions book took approximately five weeks to complete. "They were funny then, and they are funny now", Wood asserted in 2013. "Then again, I always did like smut."

Sphere Books published the first eight Confessions books. After Wood switched publishers, jumping to Futura Books, Sphere commissioned Laurence James to write twelve further Confessions books under the name "Jonathan May".

Wood also created a female counterpart, Rosie Dixon, and these were likewise written in the first person perspective and published pseudonymously under the name "Rosie Dixon". Although nine Rosie Dixon novels were published, only the first—Confessions of a Night Nurse—was made into a film, Rosie Dixon - Night Nurse (1978). The other titles were Confessions of a Gym Mistress, Confessions from an Escort Agency, Confessions of a Lady Courier, Confessions from a Package Tour, Confessions of a Physical WRAC, Confessions of a Baby Sitter, Confessions of a Personal Secretary, and Rosie Dixon, Barmaid.

This was his second series to feature a female protagonist as he started the Penny Sutton books a year previously with The Stewardesses. The other books in the series were The Stewardesses Down Under, The Jumbo Jet Girls, I'm Penny, Fly Me and Penny Sutton, Supersonic.

Wood also wrote three pseudonymous books featuring the teenager Oliver Grape: Onwards Virgins (later reissued as Forward Virgins), Crumpet Voluntary and It's a Knock Up.

As Frank Clegg, Wood also wrote Soccer Thug featuring Harold "Striker" Rickards, football hooligan.

=== James Bond ===
Wood was the first author to write novelisations of Bond films. His novelisation of The Spy Who Loved Me, renamed James Bond, the Spy Who Loved Me to avoid confusion with Ian Fleming's original novel, has nothing in common with the Fleming book. Similarly, the plot of the novelisation of Moonraker, renamed James Bond and Moonraker, is almost entirely written by Wood, although it does share some similarities with Fleming's original novel, in particular the villain Hugo Drax. Bond fans generally rate Wood's novelisations highly. Kingsley Amis wrote in the New Statesman that, despite several reservations, "Mr Wood has bravely tackled his formidable task, that of turning a typical late Bond film, which must be basically facetious, into a novel after Ian Fleming, which must be basically serious. ... the descriptions are adequate and the action writing excellent."

=== Film work ===
In 1979 LWT screened his 13-part situation comedy Lovely Couple, produced and directed by Derrick Goodwin. He also wrote the action film Remo Williams: The Adventure Begins (1985) starring Fred Ward, which was directed by former Bond director Guy Hamilton. In the late 1990s Wood wrote scripts for producer Roger Corman.

Wood's novel California, Here I Am (2004) is another semi-autobiographical work, this time set in the American film industry. William Boyd said the novel is "A very funny, shrewd and horribly accurate novel about the movie business, Hollywood-style, written with sustained brio and mordant intelligence."

== Books ==
=== As Christopher Wood ===
Mostly adventure novels, some in historical settings, and some adapted from his screenplays. Only the first edition is cited: most of these titles were also published in the United States, and reissued in paperback. The two James Bond novels were widely translated (Dutch, French, German, Italian, Spanish). Dead Centre was translated into Italian as Nel cuore dell'Australia (Mondadori, 1981).

- 1969 : Make It Happen to Me (Constable), revised and retitled for the Sphere paperback edition as Kiss Off!, 1970
- 1970 : "Terrible Hard", Says Alice (Constable)
- 1971 : John Adam, Samurai (Arlington)
- 1973 : John Adam in Eden (Sphere)
- 1976 : The Further Adventures of Barry Lyndon by Himself (Futura), sequel to Thackeray's novel, The Luck of Barry Lyndon
- 1977 : James Bond, the Spy Who Loved Me (Triad), novelisation of his screenplay
- 1979 : James Bond and Moonraker (Triad), novelisation of his screenplay
- 1979 : Fire Mountain (Michael Joseph), called North to Rabaul in the U.S.
- 1980 : Dead Centre (Michael Joseph)
- 1981 : Taiwan (Michael Joseph)
- 1983 : A Dove Against Death (Collins)
- 1985 : Kago (Collins)
- 2004 : Sincere Male Seeks Love and Someone to Wash His Underpants (Twenty First Century)
- 2004 : California, Here I Am (Twenty First Century)
- 2006 : James Bond, The Spy I Loved (Twenty First Century), memoirs

=== As Timothy Lea ===
Some series numberers place Health Farm before Private Soldier, but Health Farm was published later in 1974, after Wood moved from Sphere to Futura, and in it Sid tells Timothy, "You must have put on a stone since you came out of the army" (Chapter 1), indicating that the action takes place after Timothy's stint in the military.

- 1971 : Confessions of a Window Cleaner (Sphere)
- 1972 : Confessions of a Driving Instructor (Sphere)
- 1972 : Confessions from a Holiday Camp (Sphere)
- 1973 : Confessions from a Hotel (Sphere)
- 1973 : Confessions of a Film Extra (Sphere)
- 1973 : Confessions from the Clink (Sphere)
- 1973 : Confessions of a Travelling Salesman (Sphere)
- 1974 : Confessions of a Private Soldier (Sphere)
- 1974 : Confessions from a Health Farm (Futura)
- 1974 : Confessions from the Pop Scene (Futura), reissued from 1975 as Confessions of a Pop Performer to match the film version
- 1974 : Confessions from the Shop Floor (Futura)
- 1975 : Confessions of a Long Distance Lorry Driver (Futura)
- 1975 : Confessions of a Plumber's Mate (Futura)
- 1975 : Confessions of a Private Dick (Futura)
- 1976 : Confessions from a Luxury Liner (Futura)
- 1976 : Confessions of a Milkman (Futura)
- 1976 : Confessions from a Nudist Colony (Futura)
- 1977 : Confessions of an Ice Cream Man (Futura)
- 1979 : Confessions from a Haunted House (Futura)

=== As Penny Sutton ===
- 1973 : The Stewardesses (Sphere)
- 1973 : The Stewardesses Down Under (Sphere)
- 1974 : The Jumbo Jet Girls (Futura)
- 1975 : I'm Penny, Fly Me (Futura)
- 1976 : Penny Sutton, Supersonic (Futura)

=== As Frank Clegg ===
- 1973 : Soccer Thug (Sphere)

=== As Rosie Dixon ===
- 1974 : Confessions of a Night Nurse (Futura)
- 1974 : Confessions of a Gym Mistress (Futura)
- 1975 : Confessions from an Escort Agency (Futura)
- 1975 : Confessions of a Lady Courier (Futura)
- 1975 : Confessions from a Package Tour (Futura)
- 1976 : Confessions of a Physical WRAC (Futura)
- 1976 : Confessions of a Baby Sitter (Futura)
- 1976 : Confessions of a Personal Secretary (Futura)
- 1977 : Rosie Dixon, Barmaid (Futura)

=== As Oliver Grape ===
- 1974 : Onwards Virgins (Futura), later reissued as Forward Virgins
- 1975 : Crumpet Voluntary (Futura)
- 1975 : It's a Knock Up (Futura)

=== As John Drew ===
- 1976 : Seven Nights in Japan (Futura), novelisation of his screenplay

=== As Richard Mason ===
- 1979 : Lovely Couple (Futura), novelisation of his television screenplay

=== As James R. Montague ===
- 1979 : Worms (Futura)

=== Miscellaneous ===
- "How to Write the Perfect Bond Film", SFX, number 227, November 2012
- "Introduction", to The Confessions Collection (HarperCollins, 2014), an omnibus bringing together all of the Timothy Lea and Rosie Dixon books

== Screenplays ==
- Confessions of a Window Cleaner (1974)
- Confessions of a Pop Performer (1975)
- Seven Nights in Japan (1976)
- Confessions of a Driving Instructor (1976)
- Confessions from a Holiday Camp (1977)
- The Spy Who Loved Me (1977) – with Richard Maibaum
- Rosie Dixon - Night Nurse (1978)
- Moonraker (1979)
- Remo Williams: The Adventure Begins (1985)
- Steal the Sky (1988) – with Dorothy Tristan
- Shadow of a Scream (1996) – a.k.a. The Unspeakable
- Eruption (1997)
- Stray Bullet (1998)
- Dangerous Curves (2000)
