= Hugo Drax =

Fictional James Bond villain

Sir Hugo Drax
- James Bond character
- Michael Lonsdale as Hugo Drax
- First appearance: Moonraker (1955 novel)
- Last appearance: 007 Legends (2012 video game)
- Created by: Ian Fleming
- Portrayed by: Michael Lonsdale

In-universe information
- Gender: Male
- Affiliation: Self-employed; Blades Club; Nazi Germany (formerly; referenced in novel); Soviet Union (novel)
- Classification: Villain
- Henchmen: Willy Krebs (novel); Jaws; Chang; Blonde Beauty; Museum Guide; Lady Victoria Devon; Countess Labinsky; La Signorina del Mateo; Mademoiselle Deladier; Corinne Dufour

Sir Hugo Drax is a fictional character created by author Ian Fleming for the 1955 James Bond novel Moonraker. For the later film and its novelization, Drax was greatly altered from the novel by screenwriter Christopher Wood. In the film, Drax is portrayed by French/English actor Michael Lonsdale. In both the novel and film, Drax is the main antagonist.

== Novel biography ==
In the 1955 novel Moonraker, Sir Hugo Drax is an English World War II soldier, believed to have been working in Liverpool harbour before the war, who became a post-war millionaire. He has red hair, and half of his face is badly scarred from a German attack during the war. The same incident left him with amnesia. He is 6 ft (183 cm) tall. After the war, Drax made a fortune from trading metals in Tangier and was able to start up his company, Drax Metals Ltd, which specialises and has a monopoly in the production of the metal ore columbite. Drax is also the backer of the Moonraker missile project being built to defend the United Kingdom against its Cold War enemies. Alloys made from columbite have superior temperature resistance over conventional metals, allowing the Moonraker to burn hotter fuels in its engines and thus greatly increase its range.

The novel reveals that Drax was born in Germany as Graf Hugo von der Drache. Because his mother was English, Von der Drache was educated in England until the age of 12. Afterwards he moved to Berlin and later Leipzig, where he continued and finished his education. After graduating, he joined the Nazi Party and entered the Wehrmacht as a soldier in the Panzer Brigade 150. At the outset of World War II he took part in the Blitzkrieg campaigns in Belgium and France, before becoming a Skorzeny Werwolf commando. After the Ardennes offensive he stayed behind Allied lines when their forces crossed the Rhine and started operating in the Low Countries with his commando group. During a mission, he dressed as a British soldier so that he could sabotage and destroy a farmhouse holding a mixed liaison group of American and British servicemen, but he ended up at the same farm after being attacked by his own fighter because he was wearing a British uniform. While he was still conscious, he managed to destroy his motorbike and documents. Later he was found and brought to the farm, so he was caught in the explosion and nearly killed. He was then rescued by the British and nursed back to health, faking amnesia and claiming to be a "missing soldier" by the name of Hugo Drax. After receiving his medical discharge from the British Army, he killed a Jewish businessman in London, robbed him of £15,000, and escaped to Tangier to start his company.

Drax sets up the Moonraker missile project under the pretence of test-firing it into the North Sea. His workers are former Nazis, including most of the members of his old commando unit, and his true aim is to establish German superiority over England. To that end, he has the missile fitted with a nuclear warhead (provided by the Soviets) and changes the flight plan to target London. Drax uses his knowledge of the impending disaster to play the currency exchange market, planning to make a huge profit from his own terrorist act. James Bond, with the help of Special Branch agent Gala Brand, sabotages Drax's missile launch and targets the North Sea again. Drax and his men board a Soviet submarine to escape, but travel unwittingly through the new target area and are killed when the missile strikes them.

The later novel From Russia, with Love reveals that Drax had been an operative of the Soviet counter-intelligence agency SMERSH.

== Inspiration ==
The novel involved the idea of the "traitor within" throughout the course of the book. Drax, real name Graf Hugo von der Drache, is a "megalomaniac German Nazi who masquerades as an English gentleman", while his assistant, Krebs, bears the same name as Adolf Hitler's last Chief of Staff. In using a German as the novel's main enemy, "Fleming ... exploits another British cultural antipathy of the 1950s. Germans, in the wake of World War II, made another easy and obvious target for bad press." Moonraker uses two dictatorships that Fleming hated – the Nazis and the Soviets – as villains: Drax is German and works for the Soviets, who provide him with not only the atomic bomb, but the support and logistics to use it.

Fleming used aspects of his private life to create Drax; Fleming named the character after an acquaintance Admiral Sir Reginald Plunkett-Ernle-Erle-Drax. Other elements of the plot came from Fleming's knowledge of wartime operations carried out by T-Force, a secret British Army unit formed to continue the work of 30 Assault Unit, itself created by Fleming.

== Film biography ==
In the 1979 film adaptation Moonraker, Hugo Drax (Michael Lonsdale) is a lavish French-German billionaire who owns Drax Industries, a private company which constructs Space Shuttles for NASA. Though Drax lives in California, he resides in a fully authentic French chateau that was disassembled at its original site, transported to the United States, and rebuilt stone by stone. Drax also supposedly owns the Eiffel Tower, but has not been able to secure a permit from the French government to export it out of the country. He is an accomplished pianist, playing Frédéric Chopin's "Raindrop" Prelude on his grand piano for his guests.

James Bond (Roger Moore) follows a trail around the world to investigate the theft of a space shuttle the kind of Drax had built, as shown in the movie´s pre-credits sequence. He begins his investigation in California at Drax Industries, and follows it to Italy, then to Brazil, then into outer space.

Along the film, Drax reveals he seeks to destroy the entire human race except for a small group of carefully selected humans, both male and female, that would leave Earth on six shuttles and have sanctuary on a space station in orbit over Earth. As one of these six shuttles suffered delays, Drax decide the shuttle theft by himself. Using chemical weapons created by Drax's scientists —derived from the toxin of a rare South American plant, the Black Orchid— at an installation in Italy, he would wipe out the remainder of humanity. The biological agents were to be dispersed around the Earth from a series of 50 strategically placed globes, each containing enough toxin to kill 100 million people. After a period of time, when the chemical agents had become harmless, Drax and his master race would return to Earth to reinhabit the planet.

Bond obtains a sample of the chemical agent at the location in Italy. It leads him to a remote part of Brazil, where he finds Drax's shuttle-launch facility in an ancient civilization's shrine.

Bond and his companion, CIA agent Dr. Holly Goodhead (Lois Chiles), commandeer one of Drax's space shuttles and blast off to his orbiting space station. Bond persuades Drax's henchman Jaws (Richard Kiel) to switch allegiances by getting Drax to reveal that Jaws and his girlfriend Dolly (Blanche Ravalec) will be exterminated as "inferiors". A team of space soldiers sent by the U.S. government invade the space station, resulting in a laser battle in which Drax's "master race" are all killed. Bond then corners Drax in the station's airlock, shoots him with a cyanide-tipped dart, and ejects him into space. Finally, Bond and Holly boards one of the Shuttles, to pursuit and destroy a few toxin globes that were already fired, thus saving the world from them.

=== Henchmen ===
- Jaws – changed sides and survived
- Chang (Toshiro Suga) – thrown through a clock face by Bond, landing in a piano
- Tree Sniper (Guy Delorme) – shot by Bond
- Corrine Dufour (Corinne Cléry) – changed sides; eaten by Drax's dogs
- Samuel (S. Newton Anderson) – unknown
- Blonde Beauty (Irka Bochenko)– presumed killed during destruction of the space station
- Museum Guide (Anne Lonnberg) – presumed killed during destruction of the space station
- La Signorina del Mateo (Chichinou Kaeppler) – presumed killed during destruction of the space station
- Paramedic (Guy Di Rigo) – strapped to a stretcher and sent crashing headfirst into a billboard
- Mademoiselle Deladier (Béatrice Libert) – presumed killed during destruction of the space station
- Countess Labinsky (Catherine Serre) – presumed killed during destruction of the space station
- Lady Victoria Devon (Françoise Gayat) – presumed killed during destruction of the space station
- Cavendish (Arthur Howard) – survived
- Fraser – survived
- Dolly – fell in love with Jaws and survived

=== Novelization ===
In his novelization of the movie, screenwriter Christopher Wood describes Drax as red-haired and with a face scarred and botched by poor plastic surgery (from a time "before he could afford the best in the world"), much as originally envisioned by Fleming. Although Drax's nationality is not specified, Bond idly wonders to himself which side he fought on during World War II.

=== Video games ===
- Hugo Drax appears as a playable character in GoldenEye 007 for the Nintendo Wii and GoldenEye 007: Reloaded for the Xbox 360 and PS3.
- Hugo Drax appears in 007 Legends during the Moonraker levels with Michael Lonsdale reprising his role.

== See also ==
- List of James Bond villains
- Outline of James Bond

== Bibliography ==
- Black, Jeremy (2005). The Politics of James Bond: From Fleming's Novels to the Big Screen. U of Nebraska Press. ISBN 978-0-8032-6240-9.
- Macintyre, Ben (2008). For Your Eyes Only. London: Bloomsbury Publishing. ISBN 978-0-7475-9527-4.
- Longden, Sean (2009). T-Force: The Forgotten Heroes of 1945. London: Constable & Robinson. ISBN 978-1-84529-727-5.

Status
Preceded by Christopher Lee	Oldest living Bond villain actor Played by Michael Lonsdale; June 7, 2015 – September 21, 2020	Succeeded by Julian Glover
