= Moonraker (novel) =

1955 novel by Ian Fleming

- First edition cover, published by Jonathan Cape
- Author: Ian Fleming
- Cover artist: Devised by Fleming, completed by Kenneth Lewis
- Series: James Bond
- Genre: Spy fiction
- Publisher: Jonathan Cape
- Publication date: 5 April 1955 (hardback)
- Publication place: United Kingdom
- Pages: 255
- Preceded by: Live and Let Die
- Followed by: Diamonds Are Forever

Moonraker is the third novel by the British author Ian Fleming to feature his fictional British Secret Service agent James Bond. It was published by Jonathan Cape on 5 April 1955 and featured a cover design conceived by Fleming. The plot is derived from a Fleming screenplay that was too short for a full novel, so he added the passage of the bridge game between Bond and the industrialist Hugo Drax. In the latter half of the novel, Bond is seconded to Drax's staff as the businessman builds the Moonraker, a prototype missile designed to defend England. Unknown to Bond, Drax is German, an ex-Nazi now working for the Soviets; his plan is to build the rocket, arm it with a nuclear warhead, and fire it at London. Uniquely for a Bond novel, Moonraker is set entirely in Britain, which raised comments from some readers, complaining about the lack of exotic locations.

Moonraker, like Fleming's previous novels, was well received by critics. It plays on several 1950s fears, including attack by rockets (following the V-2 strikes of the Second World War), nuclear annihilation, Soviet communism, the re-emergence of Nazism and the "threat from within" posed by both ideologies. Fleming examines Englishness, and the novel shows the virtues and strength of England. Adaptations include a broadcast on South African radio in 1956 starring Bob Holness and a 1958 Daily Express comic strip. The novel's name was used in 1979 for the eleventh official film in the Eon Productions Bond series and the fourth to star Roger Moore as Bond; the plot was significantly changed from the novel to include excursions into space.

== Plot ==
The British Secret Service agent James Bond is asked by his superior, M, to join him at M's club, Blades. A club member, the multi-millionaire businessman Sir Hugo Drax, is winning considerable money playing bridge, seemingly against the odds. M suspects Drax is cheating, and while claiming indifference, is concerned as to why a multi-millionaire and national hero would cheat. Bond confirms Drax's deception and manages to turn the tables—aided by a stacked deck of cards—and wins £15,000 (about seven times his own annual salary).

Drax is the product of a mysterious background, purportedly unknown even to himself. Presumed to have been a British Army soldier during the Second World War, he was badly injured and stricken with amnesia in the explosion of a bomb planted by a German saboteur at a British field headquarters. After extensive rehabilitation in an army hospital, he returned home to become a wealthy industrialist. After building his fortune and establishing himself in business and society, Drax started building the "Moonraker", Britain's first nuclear missile project, intended to defend Britain against its Cold War enemies. The Moonraker rocket is an upgraded V-2 rocket using liquid hydrogen and fluorine as propellants; to withstand the ultra-high combustion temperatures of its engine, it uses columbite, in which Drax had a monopoly. Because the rocket's engine can withstand high heat, the Moonraker is able to use these powerful fuels, expanding its range across Europe.

After a Ministry of Supply security officer working at the project is shot dead, M assigns Bond to replace him and also to investigate what has been going on at the missile-building base, located between Dover and Deal on the south coast of England. All the rocket scientists working on the project are German. At his post on the complex, Bond meets Gala Brand, a beautiful police Special Branch officer working undercover as Drax's personal assistant. Bond also uncovers clues concerning his predecessor's death, concluding that the man may have been killed for witnessing a submarine off the coast.

Bond catches Drax's henchman Krebs snooping through his room. Later, an attempted assassination by triggering a landslide nearly kills Bond and Brand, as they sunbathe beneath the Dover cliffs. Drax takes Brand to London, where she discovers the truth about the Moonraker by comparing her own launch trajectory figures with those in a notebook picked from Drax's pocket. She is captured by Krebs, and finds herself captive in a secret radio homing station—intended to serve as a beacon for the missile's guidance system—in the heart of London. While Brand is being taken back to the Moonraker facility by Drax, Bond gives chase, but is also captured by Drax and Krebs.

Drax tells Bond that he was never a British soldier and has never suffered from amnesia: his real name is Graf Hugo von der Drache, the German commander of a Werwolf commando unit. Disguised in an Allied uniform, he was the saboteur whose team placed the car bomb at the army field headquarters, only to be injured himself in the detonation. The amnesia story was simply a cover he used while recovering in hospital to avoid recognition, although it would lead to a whole new British identity. Drax remains a dedicated Nazi, bent on revenge against England for the wartime defeat of his Fatherland and his prior history of social slights suffered as a youth growing up in an English boarding school before the war. He explains that he now means to destroy London, with a Soviet-supplied nuclear warhead that has been secretly fitted to the Moonraker. His company is also selling the British pound short in order to make a huge profit from the disaster.

Brand and Bond are imprisoned where the blast from the Moonraker's engines will incinerate them, to leave no trace of them once the missile is launched. Before the launch, the couple escape. Brand gives Bond the coordinates he needs to redirect the gyros and send the Moonraker into the sea. Having been in collaboration with Soviet Intelligence all along, Drax and his henchmen escape by Soviet submarine—only to be killed as the vessel makes its escape through the waters onto which the Moonraker has been re-targeted. After their debriefing at headquarters, Bond meets up with Brand, expecting her company—but they part ways after she reveals that she is engaged to a fellow Special Branch officer.

== Background and writing history ==
In early 1953 the film producer Alexander Korda read a proof copy of Live and Let Die, and informed its author, Ian Fleming, that he was excited by the book, but that it would not make a good basis for a film. Fleming told the producer that his next book was to be an expansion of an idea for a screenplay, set in London and Kent, adding that the location would allow "for some wonderful film settings".

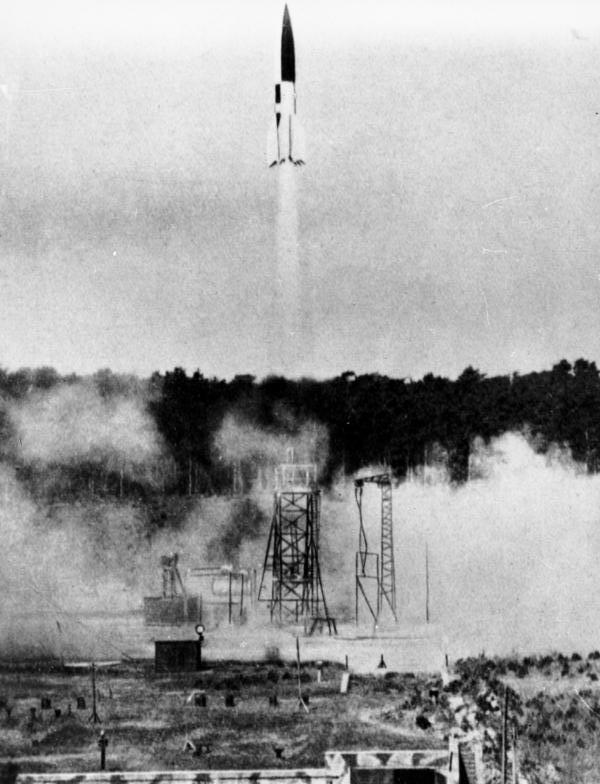
A V-2 rocket launch from summer 1943: the threat remembered from the war was the basis of the novel.

Fleming undertook a significant amount of background research in preparation for writing Moonraker; he asked his fellow correspondent on The Sunday Times, Anthony Terry, for information on the Second World War German resistance force—the Werewolves—and German V-2 rockets. The latter was a subject on which he wrote to the science fiction writer Arthur C. Clarke and the British Interplanetary Society. Fleming also visited the Wimpole Street psychiatrist Eric Strauss to discuss the traits of megalomaniacs; Strauss lent him the book Men of Genius, which provided the link between megalomania and childhood thumb-sucking. Fleming used this information to give Drax diastema, a common result of thumb-sucking. According to his biographer Andrew Lycett, Fleming "wanted to make Moonraker his most ambitious and personal novel yet." Fleming, a keen card player, was fascinated by the background to the 1890 royal baccarat scandal, (Note: The royal baccarat scandal, also known as the Tranby Croft affair, was a British gambling scandal of 1890 involving the Prince of Wales—the future King Edward VII. The scandal started during a house party when Sir William Gordon-Cumming, a decorated lieutenant colonel in the Scots Guards, was accused of cheating at baccarat in a game at which the prince was present. Although the parties tried to keep the events secret, the news leaked out, leading to a high-profile court case, at which the prince was called as a witness. The judgement went against Gordon-Cumming, who was dismissed from the army and was ostracised from society for the rest of his life.) and when in 1953 he met a woman who had been present at the game, he questioned her so intently that she burst into tears.

In January 1954 Fleming and his wife, Ann, travelled to their Goldeneye estate in Jamaica for their annual two-month holiday. He had already written two Bond novels, Casino Royale, which had been published in April 1953, and Live and Let Die, whose publication was imminent. (Note: Live and Let Die was published in hardback by Jonathan Cape on 5 April 1954.) He began writing Moonraker on his arrival in the Caribbean. He later wrote an article for Books and Bookmen magazine describing his approach to writing, in which he said: "I write for about three hours in the morning ... and I do another hour's work between six and seven in the evening. I never correct anything and I never go back to see what I have written ... By following my formula, you write 2,000 words a day." By 24 February he had written over 30,000 words, although he wrote to a friend that he felt like he was already parodying the two earlier Bond novels. Fleming's own copy bears the following inscription, "This was written in January and February 1954 and published a year later. It is based on a film script I have had in my mind for many years." He later said that the idea for the film had been too short for a full novel, and that he "had to more or less graft the first half of the book onto my film idea in order to bring it up to the necessary length".

Fleming considered several titles for the story; his first choice had been The Moonraker, until Noël Coward reminded him of a novel of the same name by F. Tennyson Jesse. Fleming then considered The Moonraker Secret, The Moonraker Plot, The Inhuman Element, Wide of the Mark, The Infernal Machine, Mondays are Hell and Out of the Clear Sky. George Wren Howard of Jonathan Cape suggested Bond & the Moonraker, The Moonraker Scare and The Moonraker Plan, while his friend, the writer William Plomer, suggested Hell is Here; the final choice of Moonraker was a suggestion by Wren Howard.

Although Fleming provided no dates within his novels, two writers have identified different timelines based on events and situations within the novel series as a whole. John Griswold and Henry Chancellor—both of whom have written books on behalf of Ian Fleming Publications—put the events of Moonraker in 1953; Griswold is more precise, and considers the story to have taken place in May of that year.

== Development ==
=== Plot inspirations ===
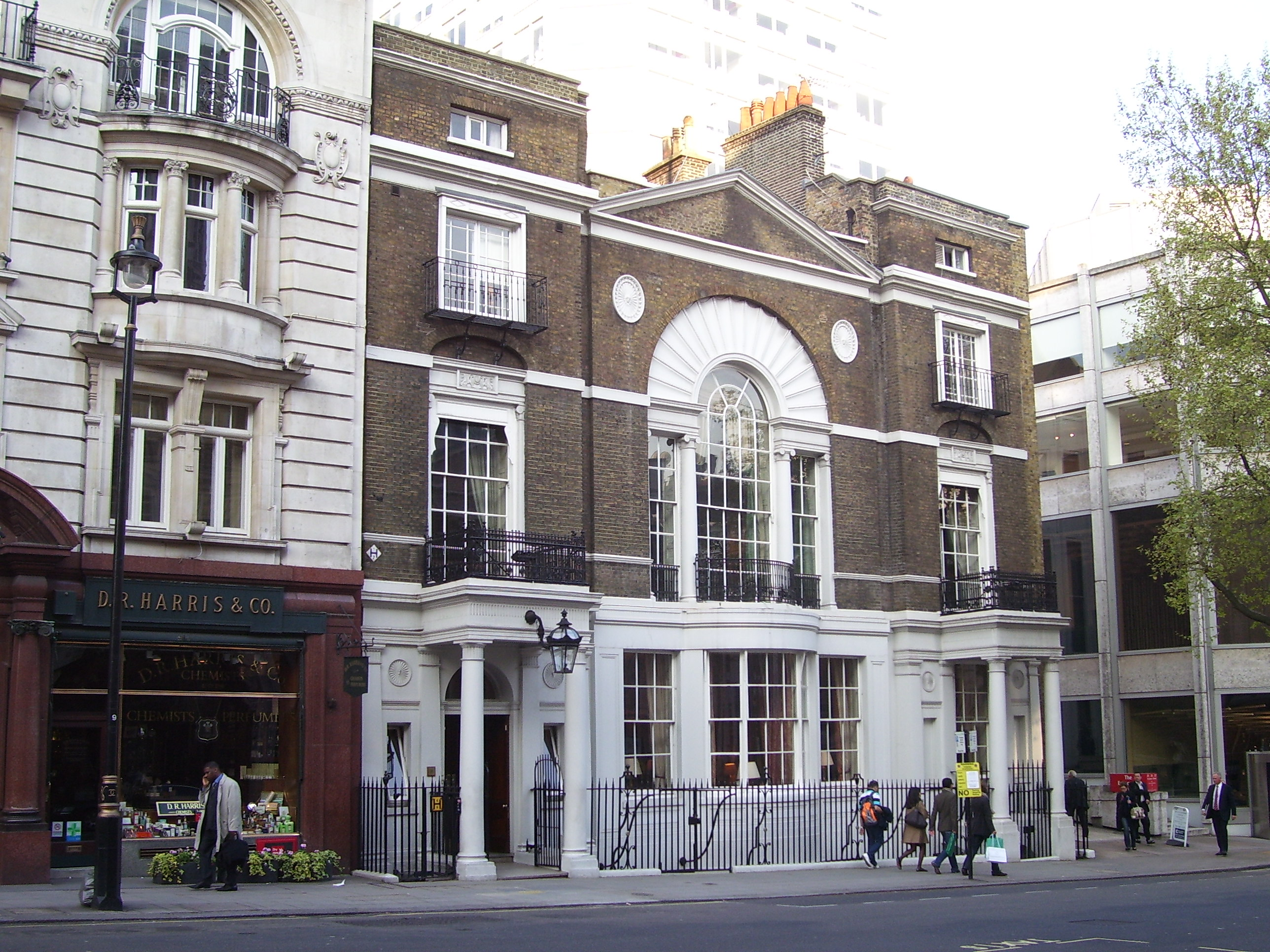
Boodle's, a gentlemen's club in London, was the model for Blades; Fleming was a member of three clubs, including Boodle's.

The locations draw from Fleming's personal experiences. Moonraker is the only Bond novel that takes place solely in Britain, which gave Fleming the chance to write about the England he cherished, such as the Kent countryside, including the White Cliffs of Dover, and London clubland. Fleming leased a cottage, White Cliffs, at St Margaret's Bay near Dover, (Note: Fleming took over the lease of White Cliffs from his friend Noël Coward in 1951.) and he went to great lengths to get the details of the area right, including lending his car to his stepson to time the journey from London to Deal for the car chase passage. Fleming used his experiences of London clubs for the background of the Blades scenes. As a clubman, he enjoyed membership of Boodle's, White's and the Portland Club, and a combination of Boodles and the Portland Club is thought to be the model for Blades; the author Michael Dibdin found the scene in the club to be "surely one of the finest things that Ian Fleming ever did".

The early chapters of the novel centre on Bond's private life, with Fleming using his own lifestyle as a basis for Bond's. Fleming used further aspects of his private life, such as his friends, as he had done in his previous novels: Hugo Drax was named after his brother-in-law Hugo Charteris and a navy acquaintance Admiral Sir Reginald Aylmer Ranfurly Plunkett-Ernle-Erle-Drax, while Fleming's friend Duff Sutherland (described as "a scruffy looking chap") was one of the bridge players at Blades. The name of the Scotland Yard superintendent, Ronnie Vallance, was made up from those of Ronald Howe, the actual assistant commissioner at the Yard, and of Vallance Lodge & Co., Fleming's accountants. Other elements of the plot came from Fleming's knowledge of wartime operations carried out by T-Force, a secret British Army unit formed to continue the work of the Fleming-established 30 Assault Unit.

=== Characters ===
According to the author Raymond Benson, Moonraker is a deeper and more introspective book than Fleming's previous work, which allows the author to develop the characters further. As such, Bond "becomes something more than ... [the] cardboard figure" that he had been in the previous two novels. The start of the book concentrates on Bond at home and his daily routines, which Fleming describes as "Elastic office hours from around ten until six, ... evenings spent playing cards in the company of a few close friends, ... or making love, with rather cold passion, to one of three similarly disposed married women." This lifestyle was largely modelled on Fleming's own, which the journalist and writer Matthew Parker sees as showing "a sourness" in the author's character. According to Chancellor, two of Bond's other vices were also displayed in the book: his fondness for gambling—illegal except in private members clubs in 1955—and excessive drink and drug taking, neither of which were frowned upon in post-war upper class circles. In preparation for beating Drax at cards, Bond consumes a vodka martini, a carafe of vodka shared with M, two bottles of champagne and a brandy; he also mixes a quantity of Benzedrine, an amphetamine, into a glass of the champagne. According to The Times journalist and historian Ben Macintyre, to Fleming the alcohol consumption "meant relaxation, ritual and reliability". Benzedrine was regularly taken by troops during the war to remain awake and alert, and Fleming was an occasional consumer.

Fleming did not use class enemies for his villains, instead relying on physical distortion or ethnic identity ... Furthermore, in Britain foreign villains used foreign servants and employees ... This racism reflected not only a pronounced theme of interwar adventure writing, such as the novels of [John] Buchan, but also widespread literary culture.

— Jeremy Black, The Politics of James Bond

Drax is physically abnormal, as are many of Bond's later adversaries. He has very broad shoulders, a large head and protruding teeth with diastema; his face is badly scarred from a wartime explosion. According to the writers Kingsley Amis and Benson—both of whom subsequently wrote Bond novels—Drax is the most successful villain in the Bond canon. Amis considers this to be "because the most imagination and energy has gone into his portrayal. He lives in the real world ... [and] his physical presence fills Moonraker". The view is shared by Chancellor, who considers Drax "perhaps the most believable" of all Fleming's villains. The cultural historian Jeremy Black writes that as with Le Chiffre and Mr Big—the villains of the first two Bond novels—Drax's origins and war history are vital to an understanding of the character. Like several other antagonists in the Bond canon, Drax was German, reminding readers of a familiar threat in 1950s Britain. (Note: Chancellor also lists Auric Goldfinger, Ernst Stavro Blofeld and Milton Krest, the American with a Prussian background.) Because Drax is without a girlfriend or wife he is, according to the norms of Fleming and his works, abnormal in Bond's world.

Benson considers Brand to be one of the weakest female roles in the Bond canon and "a throwback to the rather stiff characterization of Vesper Lynd" from Casino Royale. Brand's lack of interest in Bond removes sexual tension from the novel; she is unique in the canon for being the one woman that Bond does not seduce. The cultural historians Janet Woollacott and Tony Bennett write that the perceived reserve shown by Brand to Bond was not due to frigidity, but to her engagement to a fellow police officer.

M is another character who is more fully realised than in the previous novels, and for the first time in the series he is shown outside a work setting at the Blades club. It is never explained how he received or could afford his membership of the club, which had a restricted membership of only 200 gentlemen, all of whom had to show £100,000 in cash or gilt-edged securities. (Note: £100,000 in 1955 equates to approximately £2,274,000 in 2025, according to calculations based on the Consumer Price Index measure of inflation.) Amis, in his study The James Bond Dossier, considers that on M's salary his membership of the club would have been puzzling; Amis points out that in the 1963 book On Her Majesty's Secret Service it is revealed that M's pay as head of the Secret Service is £6,500 a year. (Note: £6,500 in 1963 equates to approximately £119,000 in 2025, according to calculations based on the Consumer Price Index measure of inflation.)

== Style ==
Benson analysed Fleming's writing style and identified what he described as the "Fleming Sweep": a stylistic technique that sweeps the reader from one chapter to another using 'hooks' at the end of each chapter to heighten tension and pull the reader into the next: Benson feels that the sweep in Moonraker was not as pronounced as Fleming's previous works, largely due to the lack of action sequences in the novel.

According to the literary analyst LeRoy L. Panek, in his examination of 20th-century British spy novels, in Moonraker Fleming uses a technique closer to the detective story than to the thriller genre. This manifests itself in Fleming placing clues to the plot line throughout the story, and leaving Drax's unveiling of his plan until the later chapters. Black sees that the pace of the novel is set by the launch of the rocket (there are four days between Bond's briefing by M and the launch) while Amis considers that the story to have a "rather hurried" ending.

Moonraker uses a literary device Fleming employs elsewhere, that of having a seemingly trivial incident between the main characters—the card game—that leads to the uncovering of a greater incident—the main plot involving the rocket. Dibdin sees gambling as the common link, thus the card game acts as an "introduction to the ensuing encounter ... for even higher stakes". Savoye sees this concept of competition between Bond and villain as a "notion of game and the eternal fight between Order and Disorder", common throughout the Bond stories.

== Themes ==
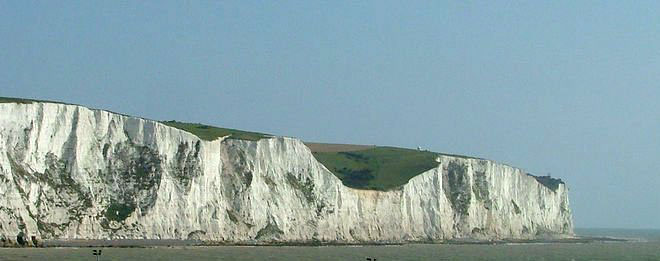
The "totemic significance" of the White Cliffs of Dover helps make Moonraker "the most British of the Bond novels", according to Black.

Parker describes the novel as "a hymn to England", and highlights Fleming's description of the white cliffs of Dover and the heart of London as evidence. Even the German Krebs is moved by the sight of the Kent countryside in a country he hates. The novel places England—and particularly London and Kent—in the front line of the cold war, and the threat to the location further emphasises its importance. Bennett and Woollacott consider that Moonraker defines the strengths and virtues of England and Englishness as being the "quiet and orderly background of English institutions", which are threatened by the disturbance Drax brings.

The literary critic Meir Sternberg considers the theme of English identity can be seen in the confrontation between Drax and Bond. Drax—whose real name Drache is German for dragon—is in opposition to Bond, who takes the role of Saint George in the conflict. (Note: Sternberg also points out that in On Her Majesty's Secret Service (1963) the character Marc-Ange Draco's surname is Latin for dragon, and in From Russia, with Love (1957) Darko Kerim's first name is "an anagrammatic variation on the same cover name".)

As with Casino Royale and Live and Let Die, Moonraker involves the idea of the "traitor within". Drax, real name Graf Hugo von der Drache, is a "megalomaniac German Nazi who masquerades as an English gentleman", while Krebs bears the same name as Hitler's last Chief of Staff. Black sees that, in using a German as the novel's main enemy, "Fleming ... exploits another British cultural antipathy of the 1950s. Germans, in the wake of the Second World War, made another easy and obvious target for bad press." Moonraker uses two of the foes feared by Fleming, the Nazis and the Soviets, with Drax being German and working for the Soviets; in Moonraker the Soviets were hostile and provided not just the atomic bomb, but support and logistics to Drax. Moonraker played on fears of the audiences of the 1950s of rocket attacks from overseas, fears grounded in the use of the V-2 rocket by the Nazis during the Second World War. The story takes the threat one stage further, with a rocket based on English soil, aimed at London and "the end of British invulnerability".

== Publication and reception ==
=== Publication history ===
Moonraker was published in the UK by Jonathan Cape in hardback format on 5 April 1955 with a cover designed by Kenneth Lewis, following Fleming's suggestions of using a stylised flame motif; the first impression was of 9,900 copies. The US publication was by Macmillan on 20 September that year. In October 1956 Pan Books published a paperback version of the novel in the UK, which sold 43,000 copies before the end of the year. In December that year the US paperback was published under the title Too Hot to Handle by Permabooks. This edition was rewritten to Americanise the British idioms used, and Fleming provided explanatory footnotes such as the value of English currency against the dollar. Since its initial publication the book has been issued in numerous hardback and paperback editions, translated into several languages and has never been out of print.

=== Reception ===
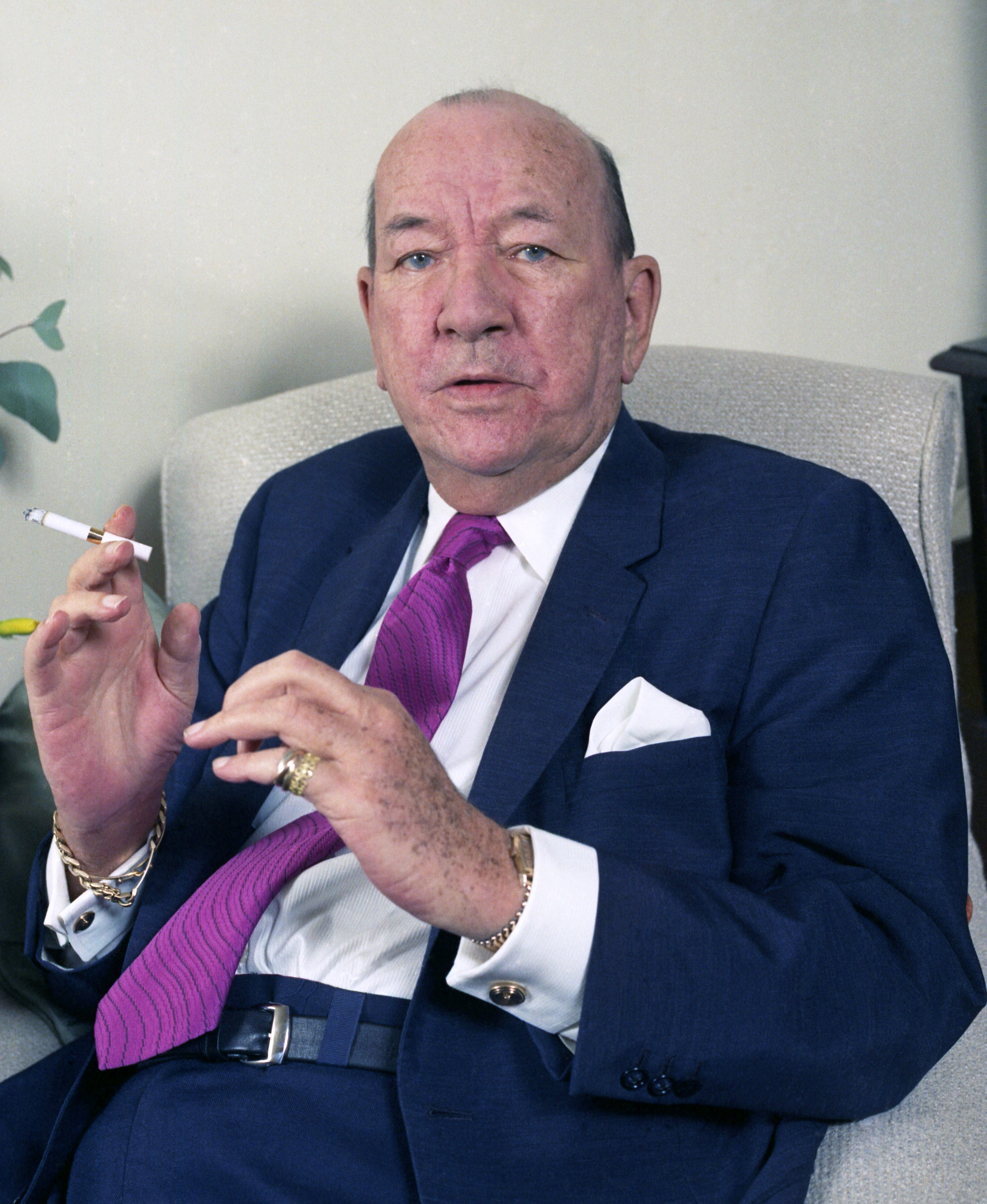
Noël Coward considered Moonraker the best of the first three Bond novels.

Fleming's friend—and neighbour in Jamaica—Noël Coward considered Moonraker to be the best thing Fleming had written to that point: "although as usual too far-fetched, not quite so much so as the last two ... His observation is extraordinary and his talent for description vivid." Fleming received numerous letters from readers complaining about the lack of exotic locations; one of which protested "We want taking out of ourselves, not sitting on the beach in Dover."

Julian Symons, writing in The Times Literary Supplement, found Moonraker "a disappointment", and considered that "Fleming's tendency ... to parody the form of the thriller, has taken charge in the second half of this story." Maurice Richardson, in his review for The Observer, was more welcoming: "Do not miss this", he urged, saying that "Mr. Fleming continues to be irresistibly readable, however incredible". Hilary Corke, writing in The Listener, thought that "Fleming is one of the most accomplished of thriller-writers", and considered that Moonraker "is as mercilessly readable as all the rest". Corke warned Fleming away from being over-dramatic, declaring that "Mr Fleming is evidently far too accomplished to need to lean upon these blood-and-thunder devices: he could keep our hair on end for three hundred pages without spilling more blood than was allowed to Shylock." The reviewer in The Scotsman considered that Fleming "administers stimuli with no mean hand ... 'Astonish me!' the addict may challenge: Mr Fleming can knock him sideways."

John Metcalf for The Spectator thought the book "utterly disgraceful—and highly enjoyable ... without [Moonraker] no forthcoming railway journey should be undertaken", although he also considered that it was "not one of Mr. Fleming's best". Anthony Boucher, writing in The New York Times, was equivocal, saying "I don't know anyone who writes about gambling more vividly than Fleming and I only wish the other parts of his books lived up to their gambling sequences". Richard Lister in the New Statesman thought that "Mr. Fleming is splendid; he stops at nothing." Writing for The Washington Post, Al Manola believed that the "British tradition of rich mystery writing, copious description and sturdy heroism all blend nicely" in Moonraker, providing what he considered was "probably the best action novel of the month".

== Adaptations ==
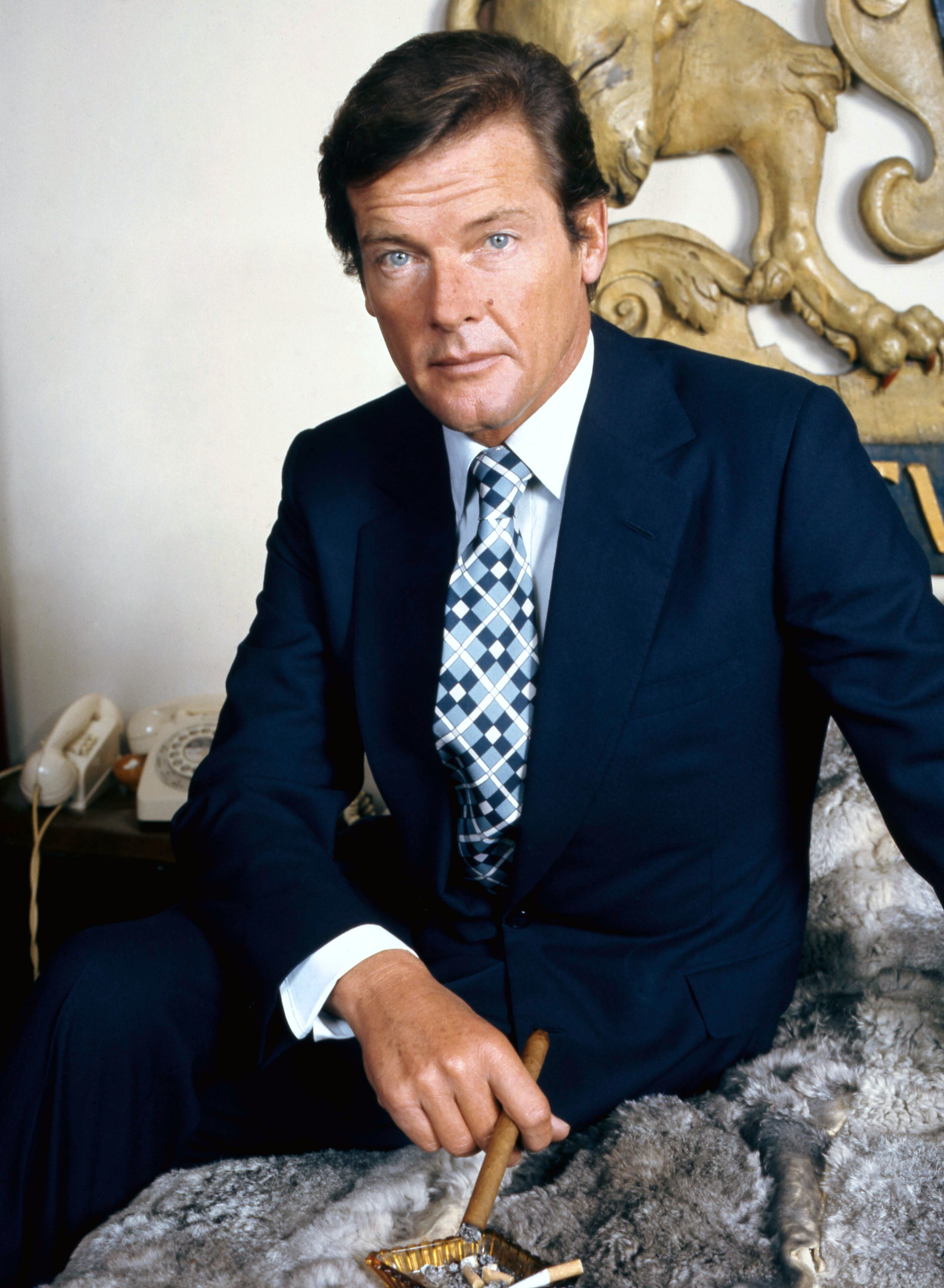
Roger Moore appeared as Bond in the 1979 adaptation of Moonraker.

The actor John Payne attempted to take up the option on the film rights to the book in 1955, but nothing came of the attempt. The Rank Organisation also came to an agreement to make a film, but this likewise fell through.

The novel was not one of Fleming's stories acquired by Eon Productions in 1961; in 1969 the company acquired the rights and commissioned Gerry Anderson to produce and co-write a screenplay. Anderson and Tony Barwick prepared a 70-page treatment that was never filmed, but some elements were similar to the final screenplay of The Spy Who Loved Me.

The first adaptation of Moonraker was for South African radio in 1956, with Bob Holness providing the voice of Bond. According to The Independent, "listeners across the Union thrilled to Bob's cultured tones as he defeated evil master criminals in search of world domination". The novel was adapted as a comic strip that was published in the Daily Express newspaper and syndicated worldwide. The adaptation was written by Henry Gammidge and illustrated by John McLusky, and ran daily from 30 March to 8 August 1959. Titan Books reprinted the strip in 2005 along with Casino Royale and Live and Let Die as a part of the Casino Royale anthology.

"Moonraker" was used as the title for the eleventh James Bond film, produced by Eon Productions and released in 1979. Directed by Lewis Gilbert and produced by Albert R. Broccoli, the film features Roger Moore in his fourth appearance as Bond. The Nazi-inspired element of Drax's motivation in the novel was indirectly preserved with the "master race" theme of the film's plot. Since the screenplay was original, Eon Productions and Glidrose Publications authorised the film's writer, Christopher Wood, to produce his second novelization based on a film; this was entitled James Bond and Moonraker. Elements of Moonraker were also used in the 2002 film Die Another Day, with a scene set in the Blades club. The actress Rosamund Pike, who plays Miranda Frost in the film, later said that her character was originally to have been named Gala Brand.

== Notes and references ==
=== Sources ===
- Amis, Kingsley (1966). The James Bond Dossier. London: Pan Books. OCLC 154139618.
- Barnes, Alan; Hearn, Marcus (2003). Kiss Kiss Bang! Bang!: The Unofficial James Bond 007 Film Companion. London: Batsford. ISBN 978-0-7134-8645-2.
- Bennett, Tony; Woollacott, Janet (1987). Bond and Beyond: The Political Career of a Popular Hero. London: Routledge. ISBN 978-0-416-01361-0.
- Bennett, Tony; Woollacott, Janet (2003). "The Moments of Bond". In Lindner, Christoph (ed.). The James Bond Phenomenon: a Critical Reader. Manchester: Manchester University Press. ISBN 978-0-7190-6541-5.
- Benson, Raymond (1988). The James Bond Bedside Companion. London: Boxtree Ltd. ISBN 978-1-85283-233-9.
- Black, Jeremy (2005). The Politics of James Bond: from Fleming's Novel to the Big Screen. Lincoln, NE: University of Nebraska Press. ISBN 978-0-8032-6240-9. Archived from the original on 23 March 2023.
- Britton, Wesley Alan (2005). Beyond Bond: Spies in Fiction and Film. Westwood, CT: Greenwood Publishing Group. ISBN 978-0-275-98556-1.
- Chancellor, Henry (2005). James Bond: The Man and His World. London: John Murray. ISBN 978-0-7195-6815-2.
- Chapman, James (2009). Licence to Thrill: A Cultural History of the James Bond Films. New York: I.B. Tauris. ISBN 978-1-84511-515-9.
- Clark, Gregory (2023). "The Annual RPI and Average Earnings for Britain, 1209 to Present (New Series)". MeasuringWorth. Archived from the original on 1 April 2023.
- Comentale, Edward P; Watt, Stephen; Willman, Skip (2005). Ian Fleming & James Bond: the cultural politics of 007. Bloomington, IN: Indiana University Press. ISBN 978-0-253-21743-1. Archived from the original on 9 July 2023.
- Eco, Umberto (2009). "The Narrative Structure of Ian Fleming". In Lindner, Christoph (ed.). The James Bond Phenomenon: a Critical Reader. Manchester: Manchester University Press. ISBN 978-0-7190-6541-5.
- Faulks, Sebastian; Fleming, Ian (2009). Devil May Care. London: Penguin Books. ISBN 978-0-14-103545-1.
- Fleming, Ian; Gammidge, Henry; McLusky, John (1988). Octopussy. London: Titan Books. ISBN 1-85286-040-5.
- Fleming, Ian; Dibdin, Michael (2006). Moonraker. London: Penguin Books. ISBN 978-0-14-102833-0.
- Griswold, John (2006). Ian Fleming's James Bond: Annotations And Chronologies for Ian Fleming's Bond Stories. Bloomington, IN: AuthorHouse. ISBN 978-1-4259-3100-1. Archived from the original on 9 July 2023.
- Hearn, Marcus; Archer, Simon (2002). What Made Thunderbirds Go!: The Authorized Biography of Gerry Anderson. London: BBC Books. ISBN 978-0-563-53481-5.
- Lindner, Christoph (2003). "Criminal Vision and the Ideology of Detection in Fleming's 007 Series". In Lindner, Christoph (ed.). The James Bond Phenomenon: a Critical Reader. Manchester: Manchester University Press. ISBN 978-0-7190-6541-5.
- Longden, Sean (2009). T-Force: The Forgotten Heroes of 1945. London: Constable & Robinson. ISBN 978-1-84529-727-5.
- Lycett, Andrew (1996). Ian Fleming. London: Phoenix. ISBN 978-1-85799-783-5.
- Macintyre, Ben (2008). For Your Eyes Only. London: Bloomsbury Publishing. ISBN 978-0-7475-9527-4.
- Matthew, H.C.G. (2004). "Edward VII". Oxford Dictionary of National Biography (online ed.). Oxford University Press. doi:10.1093/ref:odnb/32975. (Subscription, Wikipedia Library access or UK public library membership required.)
- Panek, LeRoy (1981). The Special Branch: The British Spy Novel, 1890–1980. Bowling Green, OH: Bowling Green University Popular Press. ISBN 978-0-87972-178-7.
- Parker, Matthew (2014). Goldeneye. London: Hutchinson. ISBN 978-0-09-195410-9.
- Savoye, Daniel Ferreras (2013). The Signs of James Bond: Semiotic Explorations in the World of 007. Jefferson, NC: McFarland. ISBN 978-0-7864-7056-3.
- Tomes, Jason (2010). "Cumming, Sir William Gordon Gordon-, fourth baronet". Oxford Dictionary of National Biography (online ed.). Oxford University Press. doi:10.1093/ref:odnb/39392. (Subscription, Wikipedia Library access or UK public library membership required.)
