= James Bond and Moonraker =

1979 book by Christopher Wood

- 1979 Triad Panther British paperback edition
- Author: Christopher Wood
- Language: English
- Series: James Bond
- Genre: Spy fiction
- Publisher: Jonathan Cape, Triad Panther
- Publication date: 1979
- Publication place: United Kingdom
- Media type: Hardback, paperback
- Pages: 222 pp
- Preceded by: James Bond, the Spy Who Loved Me

James Bond and Moonraker is a novelisation by Christopher Wood of the James Bond film Moonraker. Its name was changed to avoid confusion with Ian Fleming's novel. It was released in 1979.

== Plot ==
British Secret Service agent James Bond, codename 007, must prevent Sir Hugo Drax's plan to murder the entire human race and then restart humanity from outer space.

== Background ==
The screenplay of Moonraker differed so much from Ian Fleming's novel that Eon Productions authorised the film's screenwriter, Christopher Wood to write a novelisation based upon the film, as he had done for The Spy Who Loved Me.

As with the first novelisation, Wood had no input from, or communication with Glidrose Publications. Instead he worked directly with Jonathan Cape publisher Tom Maschler.

Unlike Wood's first novelisation, which showed a significant difference from the actual film, in James Bond and Moonraker, Wood writes a virtually direct novelisation of the screenplay. The only noticeable differences between the novelisation and the screenplay for Moonraker is that there is no mention of Dolly (Blanche Ravalec), Jaws (Richard Kiel)'s girlfriend, and his characterisation stays true to Wood's description as being a mute. In addition, at the conclusion of the Venetian canal chase sequence, James Bond (Roger Moore)'s gondola does not sprout a flotation device and ascend to St. Mark's Square as it does in the film.

== Reception ==
Wood's second novelisation was barely reviewed. Syndicated columnist Bob Greene was scathing. He said the novelisation was "dreary and schlocky and juvenile; it lacks all of the wonderful tension and personality of the original Fleming book. James Bond would be embarrassed to be in it. [...] In the meantime, shed a tear for Ian Fleming and James Bond. And don't, under any circumstances, buy the Moonraker you see in the stores today. Hold out for the real thing. If you can't find it in the attic, come over and I'll lend you mine."

The Los Angeles Times critic claimed that Ian Fleming "would have cringed at the writing to be found in this book."

Despite this, Wood's novel became a bestseller, remaining on The Times bestseller list for some time.

After the book's release, Eon Productions did not commission another Bond film novelisation until Licence to Kill ten years later in 1989.

== Publication history ==
- UK first hardback edition: 1979 Jonathan Cape
- UK first paperback edition: 1979 Triad Panther
- U.S. first paperback edition: 1979 Jove Books
- UK first hardcover large print edition: 1980 Chivers Press
- French first edition: 1979 Fleuve noir James Bond 007 et le Moonraker trans. André Gard
- German first edition: 1979 Goldmann Moonraker streng geheim: 007 erobert d. Weltraum trans. Tony Westermayr
- Dutch first edition: 1979 A. W. Bruna James Bond en de Moonraker trans. David Brisk
- Spanish first edition: 1979 Bruguera Moonraker trans. José M Pomares
- Japanese first edition: 1979 Hayakawa Zero zero sebun to mūnreikā trans. Kazuo Inoue
- Italian first edition: 1995 Mondadori Moonraker: Operazione Spazio trans.Stefano Di Marino
