= James Bond, the Spy Who Loved Me =

1977 novel by Christopher Wood

- 1977 Triad/Panther British paperback edition
- Author: Christopher Wood
- Language: English
- Series: James Bond
- Genre: Spy fiction
- Publisher: Jonathan Cape, Triad Panther
- Publication date: 1977
- Publication place: United Kingdom
- Media type: Hardback, paperback
- ISBN: 0224014978
- Followed by: James Bond and Moonraker

James Bond, the Spy Who Loved Me is the official novelisation of the 1977 Eon James Bond film The Spy Who Loved Me, which was itself inspired by the 1962 novel of the same title by Ian Fleming.

== Background ==
When Ian Fleming sold the film rights to the James Bond novels to Harry Saltzman and Albert R. Broccoli, he only gave permission for the title The Spy Who Loved Me to be used. Since the screenplay for the film The Spy Who Loved Me had nothing to do with Fleming's original novel, Eon Productions, for the first time, authorised that a novelisation be written based upon the script. According to Ian Fleming's literary agent Peter Janson-Smith, "We had no hand in [the Christopher Wood novelizations] other than we told the film people that we were going to exert our legal right to handle the rights in the books. They chose Christopher Wood because he was one of the screenwriters at the time, and they decided what he would be paid. We got our instructions on that, but from then on, these books-of-the-films became like any other Bond novel—we controlled the publication rights."

This would also be the first regular Bond novel published since Colonel Sun nearly a decade earlier. Christopher Wood, himself a novelist, and who co-authored the screenplay with Richard Maibaum, was commissioned to write the book, which was given the title James Bond, the Spy Who Loved Me. Wood would later write a novelisation of the screenplay for the next Bond film, Moonraker in 1979.

== Differences between novelisation and screenplay ==
The novelisation and the screenplay, although both written by Wood, are somewhat different. In the novelisation SMERSH has been reactivated some time before the start of the novel, and is still after James Bond (Roger Moore). Their part in the novelisation begins during the "pre-title credits" sequence, in which Bond is escaping from a cabin on the top of Aiguille du Mort, a mountain near the town of Chamonix. After the mysterious death of Aziz Fekkish (Nadim Sawalha), SMERSH appears yet again, this time capturing and torturing Bond for the whereabouts of the microfilm that retains plans for a submarine tracking system (Bond escapes after killing two of the interrogators). His torture by SMERSH agents is reminiscent to that by Le Chiffre from Casino Royale, only here electricity is used to attack Bond's genitals rather than a carpet beater. The revival of SMERSH goes against the latter half of Fleming's Bond novels, in which SMERSH is mentioned to have been put out of operation; however, it is explained within the novel as being Colonel-General Nikitin's doing. Members of SMERSH from the novelisation include the Bond girl Anya Amasova (Barbara Bach) and her lover Sergei Borzov (Michael Billington), as well as Colonel-General Nikitin, a character from Fleming's novel From Russia, with Love who has since become head of the KGB.

Other differences include the villain, Karl Stromberg (Curt Jürgens), instead being named as Sigmund Stromberg. The change of Stromberg's given name, as well as the existence of SMERSH, may be in some way due to the controversy over Thunderball, in which Kevin McClory was made aware of certain plot points of the film The Spy Who Loved Me. At one point the villain of the film was to be Ernst Stavro Blofeld and his organisation SPECTRE; however, this was changed to avoid a possible lawsuit over the rights to this character, which originated from the novel Thunderball.

== Publication history ==
- UK first hardback edition: July 1977 Jonathan Cape
- UK first paperback edition: July 1977 Triad Panther
- U.S. first paperback edition: 1977 Warner Books The Spy Who Loved Me
- French trade paperback edition: 1977 Julliard L'Espion qui m'aimait trans: France-Marie Watkins
- French mass market paperback: 1978 Presses pocket L'Espion qui m'aimait trans: France-Marie Watkins
- Dutch first edition: 1977 Bruna The Spy Who Loved Me trans: Ernest Benéder
- German first edition: 1977 or 1978 Goldmann James Bond und sein grösster Fall
- Norse first edition: 1978 Dreyer James Bond, spionen som elsket meg, trans: Axel S. Seeberg
- Spanish first edition: 1979 Plaza & Janes La espia que me amo trans: R. M. Bassols
- Italian first edition: 1995 Mondadori Agente 007, la spia che mi amava trans: Stefano Di Marino
- Japanese first edition: unknown year, Hayakawa, trans: Kazuo Inoue

== Reception ==
The paperback edition became an instant bestseller in the UK, staying on the British bestsellers list for several months.

Critical reception of the novel were mixed, though most praised Wood's skill as a writer. Marghanita Laski, writing in The Listener, called Wood "an apparently promising thriller writer struggling to emerge from obligatory bits of set-piece nastiness." Former Bond author Kingsley Amis wrote in The New Statesman that, despite several reservations, "Mr Wood has bravely tackled his formidable task, that of turning a typical late Bond film, which must be basically facetious, into a novel after Ian Fleming, which must be basically serious. ... the descriptions are adequate and the action writing excellent."

T. J. Binyon, writing in The Times Literary Supplement said, "Christopher Wood's style is lusher than Ian Fleming's, and teeters throughout on the brink of parody." Maurice Richardson in The Observer called "The latest licensed ersatz Bond" a "[s]uitable silly season read."

Australian novelist Eileen Alderton, writing for the Australian Women's Weekly called it "a gutsy, punchy novel" that has "as much action as anyone could take."

In their guide The Bond Files, Andy Lane and Paul Simpson say Wood's novel "counts as a decent Bond novel in its own right, and is certainly more stylish than many of the later volumes."

That said, fan reaction to the novelisation has been largely positive, with many fans claiming it to be one of the better James Bond continuation novels.

== See also ==
- Outline of James Bond
