= Mi6-HQ.com =

MI6-HQ.com
- Website type: Information & Media
- Owner: MI6-HQ.com
- Website: http://www.MI6-HQ.com
- Commercial: No

MI6-HQ.com is a media-website dedicated to the people, places and world of James Bond, providing regular updates on the subject.

== About ==
MI6-HQ.com (formerly MI6.co.uk) publishes original, in-depth articles and intercepts a comprehensive collection of news headlines involving all aspects of the world of James Bond, including news on the actors (past, present and future), the production team, film news and commercial product tie-ins. As well as news from the Bond films, MI6-HQ.com is host to a series of portals for both literary and filmic coverage of an encyclopaedic nature. The website is probably best known for its range of exclusive interviews with influential members of the James Bond world, including Charlie Higson (Young Bond writer), David Hedison (two time Felix Leiter actor), Jeffery Deaver (author of Carte Blanche, a Bond continuation novel) and Christopher Wood, screenwriter for The Spy Who Loved Me.

== Events ==
In 2005 MI6, together with Cinema Retro and BondStars.com, put together a screening of the Bond film Thunderball to celebrate the film's 40th anniversary. Dave Worrall, Lee Pfeiffer (Journalists and Cinema Retro publishers), Gareth Owen (author) and the founders of MI6 hosted the event.

As well as the screening of the 1965 film, the event hosted a book signing with Sir Christopher Frayling and question and answer sessions with Ken Adam, Molly Peters, George Leech, Martine Beswick, Earl Cameron and Norman Wanstall.

In 2010, MI6 published an exclusive copy of the "lost" Per Fine Ounce extract by acclaimed South African novelist Geoffrey Jenkins. It was released by the Jenkins estate and gives fans a glimpse into what might have been had Glidrose accepted the manuscript.

In 2019 MI6 began publishing a weekly podcast named 'James Bond & Friends'. Each week founders of the website assemble a rotating panel of James Bond experts and fans to discuss news from the Bond world and offer a fresh take on subjects. Guests have predicted important milestones in the pre-production of James Bond 25, including the hiring of Phoebe Waller-Bridge to polish the screenplay. Podcaster Mark O'Connell predicted her involvement in an episode published April 2, whilst the Guardian broke the news that Waller-Bridge would be involved with the scripting process on April 14.

== Media association ==
Press organizations and websites who have been assisted by MI6 include:

- Time magazine
- Entertainment Weekly
- Times Online
- MTV
- Reuters
- The Times
- NZ Herald

== See also ==
- MI6, the British Secret Intelligence Service
