= Jeremy Duns =

English author (born 1973)

Jeremy Duns (born 10 December 1973) is a British author of spy fiction and the history of espionage.

== Early life ==
Duns was born in Manchester and lived in New Zealand, India, Indonesia and Nigeria before the age of 10. He studied at St Catherine's College, Oxford.

== Career ==
Between 1999 and 2006 Duns worked for the Belgian English-language media platform The Bulletin as a sub-editor, lifestyle editor and then assistant editor. In Britain he has written for The Sunday Times, The Daily Telegraph and The Independent newspapers.

An admirer of Ian Fleming and James Bond, Duns unearthed pages of a lost Bond novel, Per Fine Ounce, early screenplays for Casino Royale and The Diamond Smugglers, and researched a wartime MI6 operation that inspired the opening of the film Goldfinger.

Duns writes spy fiction featuring an MI6 agent called Paul Dark, set during the Cold War. Duns's novels are influenced by Fleming, Len Deighton and John le Carré; his debut novel, Free Agent (2009), was one of the Telegraph's "thrillers of the year" in 2009. The BBC optioned the television rights to the Paul Dark series in 2009, although Duns's own website notes that the option has since lapsed.

Duns is a member of International Thriller Writers and the Crime Writers' Association.

== Stance on plagiarism and sockpuppetry ==
Duns has criticised other authors for plagiarism. In 2011 he praised the debut spy novel Assassin of Secrets by Q. R. Markham, but after reading allegations that a scene in the novel was plagiarised, Duns investigated and discovered that large sections of the novel had been copied. He informed the British publisher Hodder, and the book was pulled by Hodder and US publisher Little, Brown and Company. Markham later publicly apologised.

In 2012 he discovered that the novelist R. J. Ellory had written positive reviews of his own books while responding negatively to rivals, on the Amazon website through the use of sockpuppet accounts. Ellory admitted he had done this, and apologised for it. Duns has also examined methods used by British author Stephen Leather since his admission in 2012 that he uses a network of sockpuppets to promote his own work online. Duns has also alleged that Leather has harassed him online in retaliation.

In 2012 Duns helped organise an open letter signed by over 50 authors condemning the use by certain authors of sockpuppets, fake reviews and other deceptive marketing techniques.

== Personal life ==
Duns lived in Stockholm, Sweden, from 2004, and subsequently moved to the Swedish-speaking Åland islands, in Finland.

== Bibliography ==
- Free Agent (2009) ISBN 0670021016
- Song of Treason (2010) ISBN 978-1847394521
- The Moscow Option (2012) ISBN 978-1847394538
- The Dark Chronicles: A Spy Trilogy (2012) ISBN 978-0143120698
- Dead Drop: The True Story of Oleg Penkovsky and the Cold War's Most Dangerous Operation (2013) ISBN 978-1849839273
- News of Devils: The Media and Edward Snowden (2014) ISBN 978-1503322400
