= Cinema Retro =

English magazine

- Categories: Film
- Frequency: Triannual
- Founder: Lee Pfeiffer and Dave Worrall
- Founded: 2005
- Company: Solo Publishing
- Country: United Kingdom
- Based in: Christchurch, Dorset
- Language: English
- Website: www.cinemaretro.com
- ISSN: 1751-4606
- OCLC: 76950353

Cinema Retro is an English magazine devoted to "celebrating films of the 1960s & 1970s". Founded in 2005 by Lee Pfeiffer and Dave Worrall, it is subtitled "the Essential Guide to Cult and Classic Movies". The 64-page full-colour magazine is published three times a year with a wide range of rare or previously unseen press photographs.

== Guest columnists ==
As well as regular columns from the founders, Cinema Retro features guest columnists including:

- Christopher Lee
- Richard Kiel
- Jeremy Slate
- Madeline Smith
- David McCallum
- Raymond Benson

== Cover stories ==
Cinema Retro cover stories have included exclusive interviews with William Shatner, Jack Cardiff, Elke Sommer, Ray Harryhausen, Richard Johnson, Luciana Paluzzi, Norman Jewison, John Phillip Law, Michael York and Hugh Hefner. It also features "lost" interviews with Steve McQueen and Lee Marvin, a day with Roger Moore, and an interview with composer Lalo Schifrin. Cover stories include the 1966 film Batman, Our Man Flint, 100 Rifles Witchfinder General, the 1967 version of the James Bond film Casino Royale, Deadlier Than the Male, Dirty Harry, Get Carter, The Vampire Lovers, Bullitt, The Getaway, Girl on a Motorcycle, Prime Cut and The Man from U.N.C.L.E..

== Events ==
In 2005, Cinema Retro, "celebrating films of the 1960s & 1980s" MI6, BondStars.com organised the screening of the Bond film Thunderball, for the film's 40th anniversary. The event was hosted by Dave Worrall and Lee Pfeiffer (journalists and Cinema Retro publishers), Gareth Owen (author), and the founders of MI6.

Celebrity guest to the event included: Christopher Frayling, Ken Adam, Molly Peters, George Leech, Martine Beswick, Earl Cameron, and Norman Wanstall.

At this event, Cinema Retro publishers honored Don Black with an award for outstanding service to the motion picture industry.

In 2008, Cinema Retro presented Guy Hamilton with the magazine's second lifetime achievement award at a ceremony at Pinewood Studios in England.

In the fall of 2008, Sir Roger Moore was presented with the magazine's second lifetime achievement award at a ceremony at Pinewood Studios in England. Later that year, Sir Roger Moore was also presented with the magazine's lifetime achievement award. As with Guy Hamilton, the presentation took place at Pinewood Studios.

In 2010, Cinema Retro, in partnership with T.W.I.N.E Tours, hosted a Movie Magic Tour of British film locations. Sites visited on the 8 day trek included Stoke Park, where the famous golf game in Goldfinger was shot, Portmeirion in Wales, site of the filming of the legendary TV series The Prisoner starring Patrick McGoohan, the Stan Laurel Museum in the comic's hometown of Ulverston, a visit to the Pictureville Cinema in Bradford where the magazine sponsored a one-time showing of the MGM classic How the West Was Won in its original 3-panel Cinerama format, and Ettington Park, where director Robert Wise shot the exterior scenes for the classic 1963 version of The Haunting. It was here that the male lead in that film, Richard Johnson, joined the tour members as a special surprise guest and hosted a screening of the movie on the premises.
