= John Barkham =

John Barkham may refer to:

- John Barkham (antiquary) (c. 1572–1642), English clergyman, antiquary and historian
- John Barkham (writer) (1908–1998), South African-born American book reviewer
