= Thrilling Cities =

Book by Ian Fleming

- First edition
- Author: Ian Fleming
- Cover artist: Paul Davis
- Language: English
- Genre: Travelogue
- Publisher: Jonathan Cape
- Publication date: 4 November 1963
- Publication place: United Kingdom
- Media type: Print (hardback and paperback)
- Pages: 223

Thrilling Cities is a travelogue by the author and The Sunday Times journalist Ian Fleming. The book was first published in the UK in November 1963 by Jonathan Cape. Fleming covered Hong Kong, Macau, Tokyo, Honolulu, Los Angeles, Las Vegas, Chicago, New York, Hamburg, Berlin, Vienna, Geneva, Naples and Monte Carlo.

Thrilling Cities was initially a series of articles Fleming wrote for The Sunday Times, based on two trips he took. The first was in 1959, in which he travelled around the world, and the second was in 1960, in which he drove around Europe. The first trip was at the behest of The Sunday Times's features editor Leonard Russell; the paper's chairman, Roy Thomson, enjoyed the series so much he requested Fleming undertake a second trip. The book version includes material edited out of the original articles, as well as photographs of the various cities. Fleming is better known as the author of the James Bond series of books; Thrilling Cities is one of two non-fiction books he wrote, the other being The Diamond Smugglers, which was published in 1957.

== Synopsis ==
Thrilling Cities is Ian Fleming's view of thirteen cities he visited in two trips in 1959 and 1960. The cities it covers are: Hong Kong, Macau, Tokyo, Honolulu, Los Angeles and Las Vegas (the two cities are examined in one chapter), Chicago, New York, Hamburg, Berlin, Vienna, Geneva, Naples and Monte Carlo. Fleming's account is highly personal and deals with his visit and his experiences and impressions. Each chapter closes with what Fleming titled "Incidental intelligence", dealing with the hotels, restaurants, food and night life, in which he gives his recommendations for the best of each.

In Hong Kong, Fleming visits the bar of the Luk Kwok Hotel, a brothel—a destination made famous at the time by Richard Mason's 1957 novel The World of Suzie Wong. In Macau he goes to the Central Hotel, a nine-storey building dedicated to enjoyment, which contains casinos and a six-storey brothel. In Tokyo he meets his friend Somerset Maugham for lunch and then has a Japanese bath. Fleming also visits a geisha house. (Note: Fleming's attendant geisha, Masami, served as the inspiration for Trembling Leaf, a geisha in the novel You Only Live Twice.) As Fleming notes, "Most foreigners do not have a correct understanding of the geisha. They are not prostitutes".

During his trip to Los Angeles Fleming visits the Los Angeles Police Intelligence headquarters, where he learns about organised crime in the US. In Las Vegas he plays at the casinos, where he wins $210. (Note: $210 in 1959 is approximately equivalent to $2,180 in 2025, according to calculations based on the United States Consumer Price Index measure of inflation.) The chapter includes advice on how to gamble sensibly. In Chicago he ventures to local crime locations, such as the site of the 1929 Saint Valentine's Day Massacre and the Holy Name Cathedral, where the mob boss Hymie Weiss was gunned down in 1926.

In Hamburg Fleming visits the Reeperbahn and Herbertstraße—both part of the city's red-light district. In Berlin, Fleming is told details of Operation Stopwatch, the Anglo-American attempt to tunnel into the Soviet-occupied zone in the mid-1950s to tap into landline communication of the Soviet Army headquarters; he also crosses into East Berlin. In comparison to Hamburg, Fleming writes that Berlin was "sinister". He explains:

I left Berlin without regret. From this grim capital went forth the orders that in 1916 killed my father and in 1940 my youngest brother. In contra-distinction to Hamburg and to so many other German towns, it is only in Berlin and in the smoking cities of the Ruhr that I think I see, against my will, the sinister side of the German nation. In these two regions I smell the tension and hysteria that breed the things we have suffered from Germany in two great wars and that, twice in my lifetime, have got my country to her knees. (Note: Fleming's father died in 1917, not 1916.)

When Fleming moves on to Geneva he reports that he finds the city boring, and calls it "clean, tidy, God-fearing". He then travels to Les Avants, the village near Montreux and the European home of his close friend, the writer Noël Coward. Coward introduces him to the actor Charlie Chaplin, his neighbour. In Naples Fleming interviews the gangster Lucky Luciano, and finds him "a neat, quiet, grey-haired man with a tired good-looking face".

== Background ==
By 1959 Fleming had published six fictional novels in the preceding six years, all featuring the character James Bond; (Note: These were: Casino Royale (1953), Live and Let Die (1954), Moonraker (1955), Diamonds Are Forever (1956), From Russia, with Love (1957) and Dr. No (1958).) that year he wrote his seventh book, For Your Eyes Only, which was published in April 1960. He had also written a non-fiction work, The Diamond Smugglers, which was published in 1957. Fleming was on the staff of The Sunday Times as both a writer and the paper's foreign manager, dealing with the foreign coverage of the paper, including appointing correspondents.

In 1959 the features editor of The Sunday Times, Leonard Russell, suggested to Fleming that he take a five-week, all-expenses-paid trip around the world for a series of features for the paper. Fleming declined, saying he was a terrible tourist who "often advocated the provision of roller-skates at the door of museums and art galleries". Russell persuaded him, pointing out that Fleming could also get some material for the Bond books in the process. Fleming was given a first-class ticket that cost £803 19 shillings 2 d and £500 of traveller's cheques for expenses; (Note: £803 19 shillings 2 d in 1959 is approximately equivalent to £16,260 in 2025; £500 in 1959 is approximately equivalent to £10,110 in 2025, according to calculations based on the Consumer Price Index measure of inflation.) he flew BOAC to his first stop, Hong Kong.

Fleming was guided around Hong Kong by his friend Richard Hughes, the correspondent for The Sunday Times; Hughes was later the model for the character Dikko Henderson in Fleming's 1964 novel You Only Live Twice, as well as for "Old Craw" in John le Carré's 1977 novel The Honourable Schoolboy. Fleming stayed three days in Hong Kong, before he and Hughes flew to Macau. After staying there they flew to Tokyo where they were joined by Torao Saito—also known as "Tiger"—a journalist with the Asahi Shimbun newspaper group. Saito later became the model for the character Tiger Tanaka in You Only Live Twice. Fleming spent three days in Tokyo and decided there would be "no politicians, museums, temples, Imperial palaces or Noh plays, let alone tea ceremonies" on his itinerary; he instead visited the Kodokan—a judo academy—and a Japanese soothsayer.

Fleming left Tokyo on Friday the 13th to fly to Hawaii; 2,000 miles (3,200 km) into the Pacific one of the Douglas DC-6's engines caught fire and the plane nearly crashed, although it managed to make an emergency landing on Wake Island. After Honolulu, he moved on to Los Angeles, where he visited several places he had been before. At the Los Angeles Police Intelligence headquarters, he again met Captain James Hamilton, whom he had first encountered during his research for his 1956 novel Diamonds Are Forever. In Chicago he visited the offices of Playboy; they took him on a tour of some famous Chicago crime locations.

By the time Fleming got to New York he was fed up with travelling and his biographer Andrew Lycett notes that "his sour mood transferred to the city and indeed the country he had once loved". He wrote in his article: "Go into the first drugstore, ask your way from a passer-by, and the indifference and harshness of the New Yorker cuts the old affection for the city out of your body as sharply as a surgeon's knife." Because of his harshness toward the city, his American publishers asked him to modify the chapter; Fleming refused. By way of recompense, in August 1963 he wrote the short story "007 in New York". (Note: "007 in New York" was originally titled "Reflections in a Carey Cadillac". The story was first published in the New York Herald Tribune in October 1963 as "Agent 007 in New York".)

The series of articles was published in The Sunday Times from 24 January 1960, with an introductory piece, followed by the article on Hong Kong the following week. The series finished on 28 February 1960 with the article about Chicago and New York. (Note: The running order and dates for the publication in The Sunday Times for the first series of articles was: "Introducing The Thrilling Cities". 24 January 1960; "The Thrilling Cities: Hong Kong". 31 January 1960; "The Thrilling Cities: Surprises in Tokyo". 7 February 1960; "The Thrilling Cities: The Day the Elastic Broke". 14 February 1960; "The Thrilling Cities: Trouble in Los Angeles". 21 February 1960; "The Thrilling Cities: Gangsters Without Guns". 28 February 1960.)

Roy Thomson, the chairman of The Sunday Times, enjoyed Fleming's articles and suggested other cities to be visited, including Rio de Janeiro, Buenos Aires, Havana, New Orleans and Montreal. Others, such as the editor of The Sunday Times Harry Hodson, were less enthusiastic; Hodson considered that "more serious readers have tut-tutted a bit about missing the really important things". Instead, they agreed that Fleming should visit a series of European cities; he planned to drive most of his second tour, which concentrated on places he wanted to visit. For the trip he took his own car, a Ford Thunderbird convertible, crossing the channel and journeying through Ostend, Antwerp and Bremen before arriving at his first destination: Hamburg.

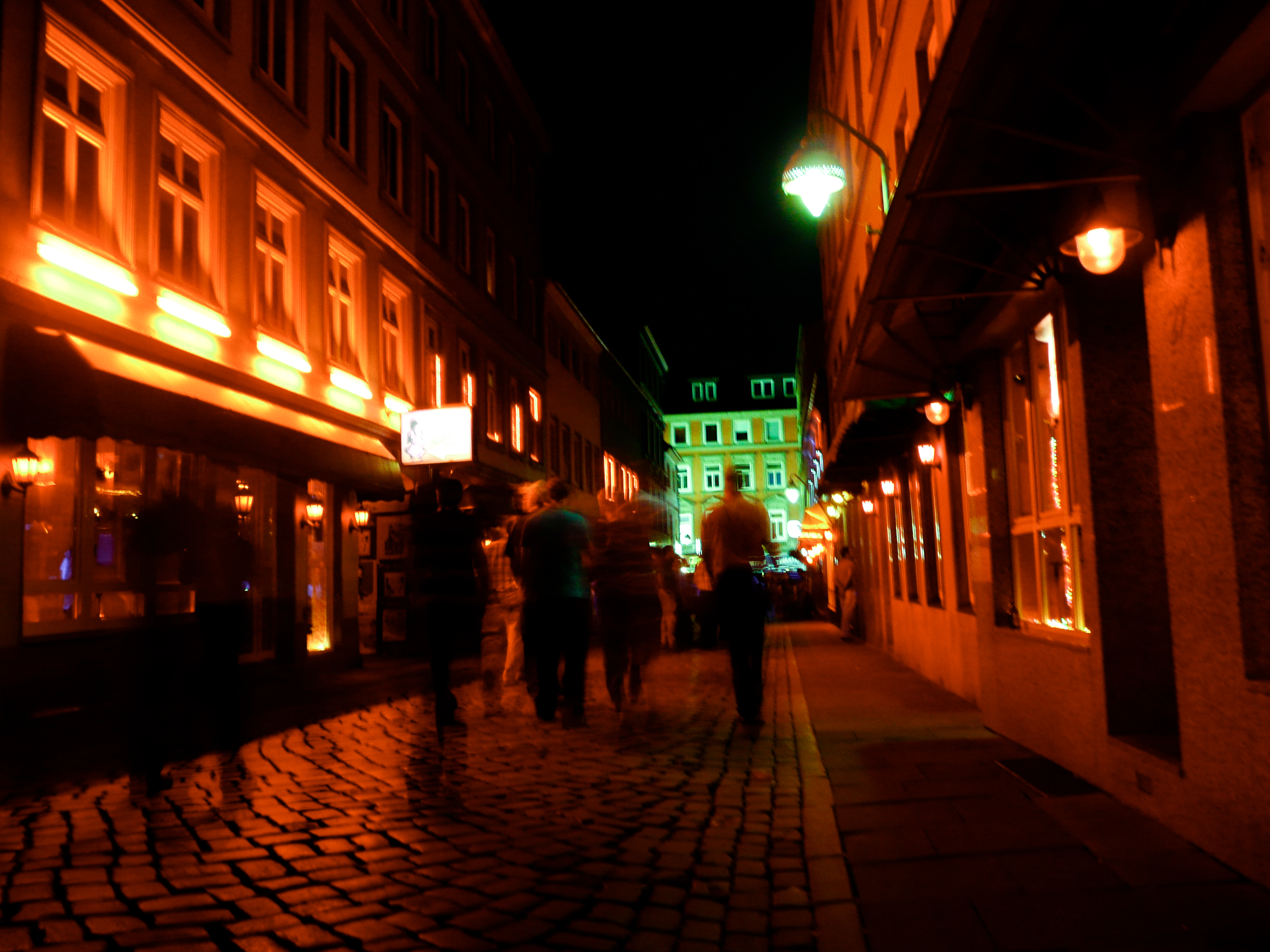
Herbertstraße, part of the red-light district Fleming visited in Hamburg

Fleming stayed only briefly in Hamburg, praising the sex industry in the city, saying "how very different from the prudish and hypocritical manner in which we so disgracefully mismanage these things in England". He moved on to Berlin, where he was shown round the city by The Sunday Times correspondent Anthony Terry and his wife Rachel.

In Geneva he met Ingrid Etler, a journalist and former girlfriend, who was resident in the city and who provided him with much of his background material. Ann Fleming joined her husband in Les Avants and for the rest of the journey. Fleming had asked his friend Noël Coward to arrange the meeting with Charlie Chaplin, as Chaplin was writing his memoirs and Leonard Russell had asked Fleming to secure the rights for The Sunday Times; Fleming was successful in his approach and the memoirs were later serialised in the paper. After visiting Naples, the Flemings moved to Monte Carlo, the final stop on Fleming's journey. Despite spending time at the casino, Fleming thought Monte Carlo somewhat seedy.

The second series of articles was published in The Sunday Times starting on 31 July 1960 with an article about Fleming's trip to Hamburg, and finished on 4 September with an article about his visit to Monte Carlo. Overall the series was considered popular and successful. (Note: The running order and dates for the publication in The Sunday Times for the second series of articles was: "The Thrilling Cities: 'Anything Goes' in Hamburg". 31 July 1960; "The Thrilling Cities: Spying is Big Business". 7 August 1960; "The Thrilling Cities: Vienna—Myths and Musts". 14 August 1960; "The Thrilling Cities: Geneva's Prim Façade". 21 August 1960; "The Thrilling Cities: In and Around Brazen Naples". 28 August 1960; "The Thrilling Cities: My Monte Carlo System". 4 September 1960.)

When the idea of the series was first considered, in November 1957, the provisional title given was Round the World in Eight Adventures; later considered were The Thrilling Cities—subsequently used for the newspaper articles—and More Thrilling Cities.

== Publication and reception ==
Thrilling Cities was first published in the UK by Jonathan Cape, on 4 November 1963; the book was 223 pages long and cost 30 shillings. (Note: 30 shillings in 1963 is approximately equivalent to £30 in 2025, according to calculations based on the Consumer Price Index measure of inflation.) There were 10,000 copies in the first print run. In October 1964 Pan Books published a paperback version of Thrilling Cities in the UK; it was published in two volumes. Each volume cost 3 shillings 6 d and the print run was 100,000 copies. (Note: 3 shillings 6 d in 1963 is approximately equivalent to £3 in 2025, according to calculations based on the Consumer Price Index measure of inflation.) A second print run of 60,000 copies was needed by November 1964. The cover was designed by the artist Paul Davis and shows "a surreal version of Monte Carlo". For the US market, Thrilling Cities was released in June 1964 through New American Library and cost $4.95. (Note: $4.95 in 1964 is approximately equivalent to $50 in 2025, according to calculations based on the United States Consumer Price Index measure of inflation.) The book also included the short story "007 in New York".

=== Reception ===
Thrilling Cities received mixed reviews when it was published as a book. Honor Tracy, The Guardian's critic, thought Fleming "writes without any pretension at all", while also managing to be both entertaining and amusing, which led to "a lively, enjoyable book, written from an unusual point of view". The reviewer for The Times thought that Fleming's style was "no nonsense over fine writing", and summed up the book as "Fleming's smooth, sophisticated, personally conducted tours". Francis Hope, who was writing for The Observer, was surprised by Fleming's written style, which he found to be "more flabbily verbose than one expects of a thriller writer", although this was redeemed in Hope's eyes by the discussions Fleming had with local crime experts in several cities. The critic for The Financial Times, James Bredin, found the book unsatisfying because of its brevity, although he thought that Thrilling Cities was good enough and well written so that it "can—and will, compulsively—be read at a sitting".

Some reviewers observed Thrilling Cities was written either with Bond in mind, or as if he were the visitor. Charles Poore, writing in The New York Times, calls Fleming "Flemingbond" because "it is as if James Bond had decided to take his ghost on holiday", given the book's angles of pleasure and crime, and The Boston Globe's Marjory Adams refers to the book's author as "Fleming-Com Bond". David Holloway's review in The Daily Telegraph describes the subject as "James Bond's world rather than Mr Fleming's". Writing for The Times Literary Supplement, Xan Fielding thought the thrills were limited in the book, but hoped that the material gathered would be used in Fleming's Bond works with thrills included.

Reviewing for The Evening Standard, Tom Pocock thought it read as recollections of the "voluptuous pleasures with the relish of a slightly raffish uncle". John Raymond, in The Sunday Times, wrote that "Mr Fleming's prose arouses the voyeur that lurks in all but the best of us"; he considered that the book remained "supremely readable" throughout. Writing for the Daily Express, Peter Grosvenor thought that Fleming—a "tourist extraordinary"—was "never afraid to record a controversial view", citing Fleming's views on the differences between eastern and western women's approaches to men. The reviewer for The Listener thought that although the book was fascinating, it was "disarmingly snob-ridden". Robert Kirsch, who reviewed for the Los Angeles Times, considered Fleming to be "a second-rate reporter, filled with the irritating prejudices and pomposities of a middle-class English traveller" and that "Fleming's wit is provincial".

== Notes and references ==
=== Sources ===
==== Books ====
- Benson, Raymond (1988). The James Bond Bedside Companion. London: Boxtree. ISBN 978-1-85283-233-9.
- Chancellor, Henry (2005). James Bond: The Man and His World. London: John Murray. ISBN 978-0-7195-6815-2.
- Fleming, Fergus (2015). The Man with the Golden Typewriter: Ian Fleming's James Bond Letters. New York: Bloomsbury. ISBN 978-1-6328-6489-5.
- Fleming, Ian (1964). Thrilling Cities. London: The Reprint Society. OCLC 3260418.
- Gilbert, Jon (2012). Ian Fleming: The Bibliography. London: Queen Anne Press. ISBN 978-0-9558-1897-4.
- Griswold, John (2006). Ian Fleming's James Bond: Annotations and Chronologies for Ian Fleming's Bond Stories. Bloomington, Indiana: AuthorHouse. ISBN 978-1-4259-3100-1.
- Hatcher, John (2007). "Ian Fleming (1908–64), Novelist and Journalist". In Cortazzi, Hugh (ed.). Britain & Japan: Biographical Portraits. Folkestone, Kent: Global Oriental. pp. 221–233. ISBN 978-1-9052-4633-5.
- Hines, Claire (2018). The Playboy and James Bond: 007, Ian Fleming and Playboy Magazine. Manchester: Manchester University Press. ISBN 978-0-7190-8226-9.
- Langmore, Diane (2009). Australian Dictionary of Biography: Volume 17 1981–1990 A-K. Melbourne: The Miegunyah Press. ISBN 978-0-522-85382-7.
- Lycett, Andrew (1996). Ian Fleming. London: Phoenix. ISBN 978-1-85799-783-5.
- Macintyre, Ben (2008). For Your Eyes Only. London: Bloomsbury Publishing. ISBN 978-0-7475-9527-4.
- Pearson, John (1967). The Life of Ian Fleming: Creator of James Bond. London: Jonathan Cape. OCLC 6553250.

==== Inflation calculations ====
- Clark, Gregory (2023). "The Annual RPI and Average Earnings for Britain, 1209 to Present (New Series)". MeasuringWorth.
- 1634–1699: McCusker, John J. (January 1996a). "How Much Is That in Real Money? A Historical Price Index for Use as a Deflator of Money Values in the Economy of the United States: Addenda et Corrigenda" (PDF). Proceedings of the American Antiquarian Society. 106 (2): 327–334.
- 1700–1799: McCusker, John J. (October 1996b). "How Much Is That in Real Money? A Historical Price Index for Use as a Deflator of Money Values in the Economy of the United States" (PDF). American Antiquarian Society. 106 (2): 327–334.
- 1800–present: "Consumer Price Index, 1800–". Federal Reserve Bank of Minneapolis.

==== Journals and magazines ====
- Fielding, Xan (5 December 1963). "Men about Towns". The Times Literary Supplement. London. p. 1006.
- Wordsworth, Christopher (14 November 1963). "Book Reviews". The Listener. Vol. 70, no. 1807. pp. 799–800.

==== Newspapers ====
- Adams, Marjory (18 June 1964). "Book of the Day". The Boston Globe. p. 24.
- Bredin, James (18 November 1963). "World Citizens". The Financial Times. p. 14.
- "City Couriers". The Times. 14 November 1963. p. 17.
- Grosvenor, Peter (12 December 1963). "The Oriental Lady and the Spy". The Daily Express. p. 6.
- Holloway, David (22 November 1963). "Two Men's Cities". The Daily Telegraph. p. 20.
- Hope, Francis (10 November 1963). "Purple Trail". The Observer. p. 24.
- Kirsch, Robert (22 June 1964). "Ian Fleming Travel Pieces aren't Thrillers". Los Angeles Times. p. C11.
- Pocock, Tom (3 December 1963). "You Can Always go by Balloon". The Evening Standard. p. 17.
- Poore, Charles (16 June 1964). "Ian Fleming Travels as Valet to his Hero". The New York Times. p. 37.
- Raymond, John (10 November 1963). "Ulysses Unlimited". The Sunday Times. p. 37.
- Tracy, Honor (22 November 1963). "Two Flying Visitors". The Guardian. p. 6A.

===== "Thrilling Cities" articles =====
- Fleming, Ian (24 January 1960a). "Introducing The Thrilling Cities". The Sunday Times. p. 30.
- Fleming, Ian (31 January 1960b). "The Thrilling Cities: Hong Kong". The Sunday Times. p. 11.
- Fleming, Ian (28 February 1960c). "Gangsters Without Guns". The Sunday Times. p. 13.
- Fleming, Ian (28 August 1960d). "In and Around Brazen Naples". The Sunday Times. p. 20.
- Fleming, Ian (31 July 1960e). "'Anything Goes' in Hamburg". The Sunday Times. p. 17.
- Fleming, Ian (4 September 1960f). "My Monte Carlo System". The Sunday Times. p. 24.

==== Websites ====
- "Ian Fleming's James Bond Titles". Ian Fleming Publications. Archived from the original on 10 August 2015.
