= A Twist of Sand =

1968 British film by Don Chaffey

- Directed by: Don Chaffey
- Written by: Geoffrey Jenkins (novel); Marvin Albert (screenplay)
- Produced by: Fred Engel
- Starring: Richard Johnson; Honor Blackman; Jeremy Kemp; Peter Vaughan
- Cinematography: John Wilcox
- Edited by: Alastair McIntyre
- Music by: Tristram Cary
- Production company: Christina Films
- Distributed by: United Artists
- Release dates: 9 October 1968 (United States); November 1968 (United Kingdom)
- Running time: 90 minutes
- Country: United Kingdom
- Language: English

A Twist of Sand is a 1968 British adventure film directed by Don Chaffey and starring Richard Johnson, Jeremy Kemp, Honor Blackman and Peter Vaughan. The screenplay was by Marvin Albert was based on Geoffrey Jenkins' 1959 novel of the same name.

== Plot ==
A former British naval officer now makes his living by smuggling goods around the Mediterranean. After being forced to dump his cargo when nearly caught by the authorities in Malta, he is eager to recoup his losses. When a former colleague appears and tells a wild story about smuggling diamonds out of south-west Africa, he sees his chance to make a lot of money. The diamonds are hidden in a shipwreck buried in the sand dunes of Namibia's Skeleton Coast.

In recurring flashbacks, the captain relives his wartime experiences as the commander of a Royal Navy submarine, sent to South African waters to destroy an experimental U-Boat.

== Cast ==
- Richard Johnson as Geoffrey Peace
- Honor Blackman as Julie Chambois
- Jeremy Kemp as Harry Riker
- Peter Vaughan as Johann
- Roy Dotrice as David Carland
- Guy Doleman as patrol boat commander
- Jack May as Diamond Security Police Inspector Seekert
- Kenneth Cope as Flag Officer
- Tony Caunter as Sonarman Elton
- Clifford Evans as Admiral Tringham

== Production ==
Geoffrey Jenkins initially sold the rights for his 1959 novel to filmmaker Nunnally Johnson at 20th Century Fox. Johnson intended to write the script himself and have Robert Mitchum and Deborah Kerr cast in the starring roles. It was one of several leading roles for Richard Johnson in the late 1960s.

== Reception ==
The Monthly Film Bulletin wrote: "A Twist of Sand is the kind of film (ill-matched party trekking interminably across the desert in search of hidden diamonds) that Hollywood was churning out regularly twenty years ago, and apart from an imaginative pre-credits sequence it might indeed have been made then. The desert trek is reasonably convincing, but the scenes in which the cutter negotiates the hazards of the Skeleton Coast look uncomfortably phony. In the circumstances the performances, particularly those of Jeremy Kemp as the villain of the party and Peter Vaughan as a raving German, are suitably histrionic and give rise to some unintentionally comic moments. But as the characters are about as real as puppets, it hardly matters."

Kine Weekly wrote: "Though it is a little protracted at times, this is a good, outdoors adventure yarn, with enough tough action to keep the excitement going. ... The film gives promise of its exciting nature during the credit titles, during which Geoffrey and David are chased by Naval craft and only just manage to ditch their smuggled arms in time. Flashbacks to a war-time exploit when Geoffrey was ordered to destroy the German submarine without leaving any survivors explain his sombre outlook on life and authority and also provide the reason why he is chosen to find the diamonds. There is some interesting underwater photography and a thrilling episode when the boat is steered through jagged reefs."

Variety wrote: "Good action programmer with better acting and writing than such films usually provide. Should make its mark."
