= Geoffrey Jenkins =

South African writer (1920–2001)

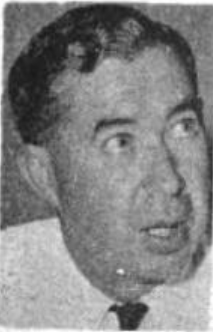
- Born: Geoffrey Ernest Jenkins; 16 June 1920; Pretoria, South Africa
- Died: 7 November 2001 (aged 81); Durban, South Africa
- Occupation: Writer

Geoffrey Ernest Jenkins (16 June 1920 – 7 November 2001) was a South African journalist, novelist and screenwriter. His wife Eve Palmer, with whom he collaborated on several works, wrote numerous non-fiction works about Southern Africa.

== Early life ==
Jenkins was born either in Port Elizabeth or in Pretoria to Ernest Jenkins, an editor, and Daisy Jenkins. At age 17, he wrote and had published A Century of History, which received a special eulogy from General Jan Smuts at the Potchefstroom centenary celebrations. Smuts also wrote the book's introduction.

Jenkins subsequently won the Lord Kemsley Commonwealth Journalistic Scholarship, which took him to Fleet Street, where he spent World War II as a war correspondent.

While working for the Sunday Times, he became friends with author Ian Fleming, creator of the fictional British secret agent James Bond. Fleming later praised Jenkins' writing, saying "Geoffrey Jenkins has the supreme gift of originality... A Twist of Sand is a literate, imaginative first novel in the tradition of high and original adventure".

After the war Jenkins settled in Rhodesia, where he met his wife, author Eve Palmer (1916–1998). They married on 17 March 1950. They had a son named David (born c. 1953).

Jenkins was briefly editor of the newspaper The Umtali Advertiser then became a reporter at The Star newspaper in Johannesburg.

== Writing ==
=== Early novels ===
While working for The Star, he wrote his first novel, A Twist of Sand (1959), which was subsequently translated into 23 languages and became a motion picture of the same name by Don Chaffey in 1968, starring Richard Johnson and Honor Blackman. He kept his newspaper job until he had published his third novel.

Jenkins' 1966 novel Hunter-Killer was a sequel to A Twist of Sand. Hunter-Killer opens with the protagonist, Geoffrey Peace RN, faking his own death and funeral at sea, only to clamber aboard a submarine.

=== James Bond ===
After Ian Fleming's death, Glidrose Productions commissioned Jenkins to write a James Bond novel in 1966. Jenkins claimed that he and Fleming together developed a diamond-smuggling storyline in 1957. After a long period of negotiation, during which Ann Fleming (Ian's widow) raised several objections to the idea of a continuation novel, Jenkins finished the manuscript for Glidrose entitled Per Fine Ounce, but it was rejected. The novel is believed lost, except for 18 pages now in the hands of Jenkins' son David. Two pages have been released to the public and were exclusively published by the James Bond website MI6-HQ.com. Ian Fleming Publications (formerly Glidrose) allegedly returned their copies of the manuscript after rejecting it.

=== Later works ===
Jenkins did colour photography for his wife's non-fiction work Trees of Southern Africa (1972). The couple travelled over 100,000 miles to research this three volume work. They subsequently collaborated on the 1978 travel book The Companion Guide to South Africa. Helene Moore of the Knight Ridder syndicate believed that it was "impossible to cram everything pertinent into one guidebook and do a thorough job of it," but felt that the authors have chosen "the right solution." Moore claimed that the over four-hundred page book gave the authors sufficient space "for single-minded reporting on what to see at the bottom of this exotic continent - plus plentry of space for history, legend and all the personal commentary that enriches any travel book. Good reading even if you're not headed that way."

=== Later years and death ===
Jenkins published his final novel A Daystar of Fear in 1993. Jenkins moved from Pretoria to his son David's home in Durban. According to an obituary, he was planning to write a sequel to Scend of the Sea shortly before his death in 2001.

== Film adaptations ==
Three of his novels have been filmed. A Twist of Sand (1968) co-starred Honor Blackman and Richard Johnson, director Terence Young's original choice for James Bond. Dirty Games (1989), based on In Harm's Way, co-starred Jan-Michael Vincent.

The River of Diamonds (1990) had been set for production in the 1960s. During the 1980s Brian Clemens wrote a script. Sylvester Stallone - who asked for US$9M and a share of the profits - and Tom Selleck - who asked for US$1.5M and a share of the profits - were approached to star, but asked too much money which the production couldn't afford. A journal describes this as South Africa's "most ambitious film project" with what was at the time to have been the biggest budget financed by a South African producer estimated to have been between two and three million Rand.

== Works ==
=== Novels ===
- A Twist of Sand (1959)
- The Watering-Place of Good Peace (1960; revised 1974)
- A Grue of Ice (1962) published in the U.S. as The Disappearing Island
- The River of Diamonds (1964)
- Hunter-Killer (1966)
- Scend of the Sea (1971) published in the U.S. as The Hollow Sea
- A Cleft of Stars (1973)
- A Bridge of Magpies (1974)
- South Trap (1979) published in paperback as Southtrap
- A Ravel of Waters (1981)
- The Unripe Gold (1983)
- Fireprint (1984)
- In Harm's Way (1986)
- Hold Down a Shadow (1989)
- A Hive of Dead Men (1991)
- A Daystar of Fear (1993)

Unpublished

- Per Fine Ounce (circa 1966)
- A Kiss of Thorns
- Disquietly to His Grave
- A Gate of Blood
- A Knot of Fire

=== Non-fiction ===
- A Century of History: The Story of Potchefstroom (1939; 2nd edition 1971)
- The Companion Guide to South Africa (1978), with Eve Palmer

Photography only

- Palmer, Eve; Pitman, Norah (1972). Trees of Southern Africa. colour photography by Geoffrey Jenkins and others. A. A. Balkema. (3 vols.)

=== Unproduced screenplay ===
- Fifth Paw of the Lion (1966, Columbia Pictures, Charles H. Schneer Productions)
