= Free Agent (novel) =

2009 novel by Jeremy Duns

- First UK edition cover of Free Agent; With quote from Eric Van Lustbader: "I dare anyone to put this book down after reading the first electrifying chapter"
- Author: Jeremy Duns
- Cover artist: Tavis Coburn
- Language: English
- Series: Paul Dark
- Genre: Thriller, spy
- Publisher: Simon & Schuster (UK); Viking Press (US)
- Publication date: 5 May 2009
- Publication place: United Kingdom
- Media type: Print (hardcover)
- Pages: 352
- ISBN: 978-1-84737-442-4
- Followed by: Free Country

Free Agent is a 2009 spy thriller novel written by Jeremy Duns. It is the first in a trilogy of spy thrillers featuring MI6 agent Paul Dark and is set at the height of the Cold War in 1969. The novel is set in London and Nigeria during the Nigerian Civil War. Duns has said he was influenced by the novels A Dandy in Aspic, by Derek Marlowe and The Human Factor by Graham Greene.

It was published in the United Kingdom on 5 May 2009 by Simon & Schuster and was released in the United States on 25 June 2009 by Viking Press.

Jeremy Duns is a member of International Thriller Writers.

== Tagline ==
March 1969. John and Yoko are in bed. Harold Wilson is in Number 10. And Paul Dark is on the run from MI6, the KGB ... and himself.

== Reception ==
Free Agent received generally positive reviews. The Daily Telegraph considered the novel to be "a retro-cool romp as spare of prose as it is cleverly convoluted of plot", and later named it as one of its "Thrillers of the Year", praising "the timeless feel [that] fosters the clear impression of Duns as a talented thriller geek posing a challenge to modern publishing". The Guardian agreed, and considered the book to be an "excellent debut" born from the writer's "deep knowledge of espionage and classic spy novels", while Publishers Weekly wrote that "Duns's terrific debut will draw inevitable comparisons to early John le Carré", Kirkus Reviews was also positive in saying that the "plotting is delectably tricky", although they tempered the praise by highlighting that "the character of Dark requires more shading before he returns for the promised next episode". When the trilogy of Paul Dark books was released, a further review by Kirkus noted that "the immediacy of Duns' writing grabs and suspends the reader in a beautifully realized heartbeat of recent history". The South African news outlet Independent Online agreed with Eric Van Lustbader that the "first chapter is electrifying", although "it comes a terrible sense of disappointment as we swiftly find ourselves in the swamps of moral equivalence".
