= The Diamond Smugglers =

1957 book by Ian Fleming

- First-edition cover
- Author: Ian Fleming
- Language: English
- Publisher: Jonathan Cape
- Publication date: 29 November 1957
- Publication place: United Kingdom
- Media type: Print (hardback and paperback)
- Pages: 160

The Diamond Smugglers is a non-fiction book by Ian Fleming that was first published in the United Kingdom by Jonathan Cape on 29 November 1957. The book is based on two weeks of interviews Fleming undertook with John Collard, a member of the International Diamond Security Organisation (IDSO) and a former member of MI5; the IDSO was headed by Sir Percy Sillitoe, the ex-head of MI5 who worked for the diamond company De Beers.

The IDSO was formed by Sillitoe to combat the smuggling of diamonds from Africa, where it was estimated that £10 million worth of gems were being smuggled every year out of South Africa alone. (Note: £10 million in 1957 is approximately equivalent to £209,450,000 in 2025, according to calculations based on the Consumer Price Index measure of inflation.) The book expands upon a series of articles Fleming wrote for The Sunday Times in 1957.

Fleming is better known as the author of the series of books about James Bond; in 1956 Fleming wrote Diamonds Are Forever which sparked his interest in the diamond industry. The Diamond Smugglers is one of two non-fiction books he wrote. It received mixed reviews, although critics thought the subject was interesting and that the facts were as interesting as works of fiction. There was interest in turning the book into a film, but the plans did not come to fruition.

== Synopsis ==
The Diamond Smugglers is the account of Ian Fleming's meeting with John Collard, a member of the International Diamond Security Organisation (IDSO). The book takes the form of a narrative by Fleming of the first meeting between the two men, interspersed with the interview between Fleming and Collard, the latter of whom is introduced under the pseudonym of "John Blaize".

Collard relates how he was recruited into the IDSO by Sir Percy Sillitoe—the ex-head of MI5, the UK's domestic counter-intelligence and security agency—under whom he had worked. (Note: Collard's work at MI5 including assisting in identifying and capturing Klaus Fuchs, the spy who passed atomic research to the Soviet Union.) The book goes on to look at the activities of the IDSO from the end of 1954 until the operation was closed down in April 1957, when its job was complete. Collard explained that the IDSO was set up at the instigation of the chairman of the diamond company De Beers, Sir Philip Oppenheimer, after an Interpol report stated that £10 million of diamonds were being smuggled out of South Africa each year, as well as additional amounts from Sierra Leone, Portuguese West Africa, the Gold Coast and Tanganyika (now Angola, Ghana and part of Tanzania, respectively).

As well as providing a history of the IDSO's operations, Collard relates a number of vignettes concerning the diamond smuggling cases he and the organisation dealt with. This included using undercover agents to infiltrate the smuggling gangs and using other agents to pose as diamond buyers to pick up cheaper, illegally mined stones. Collard discussed an investigation in Liberia, a country that had no diamonds, but was a huge diamond exporter. It neighboured the diamond-rich Sierra Leone and he observed that all Liberia's diamond exports had been illegally mined in Sierra Leone and smuggled over the border. A Liberian senator claimed to own a diamond mine from which many of the stones came; the IDSO visited the mine and undertook geological surveys of the region to prove there was no diamondiferous ore and the mine was not viable. There was also a description of some of the major figures involved in smuggling, including Monsieur Diamant, whom Collard described as "the biggest crook in Europe, if not the world", who received and sold most of the illegal diamonds being transported through Europe.

== Background ==
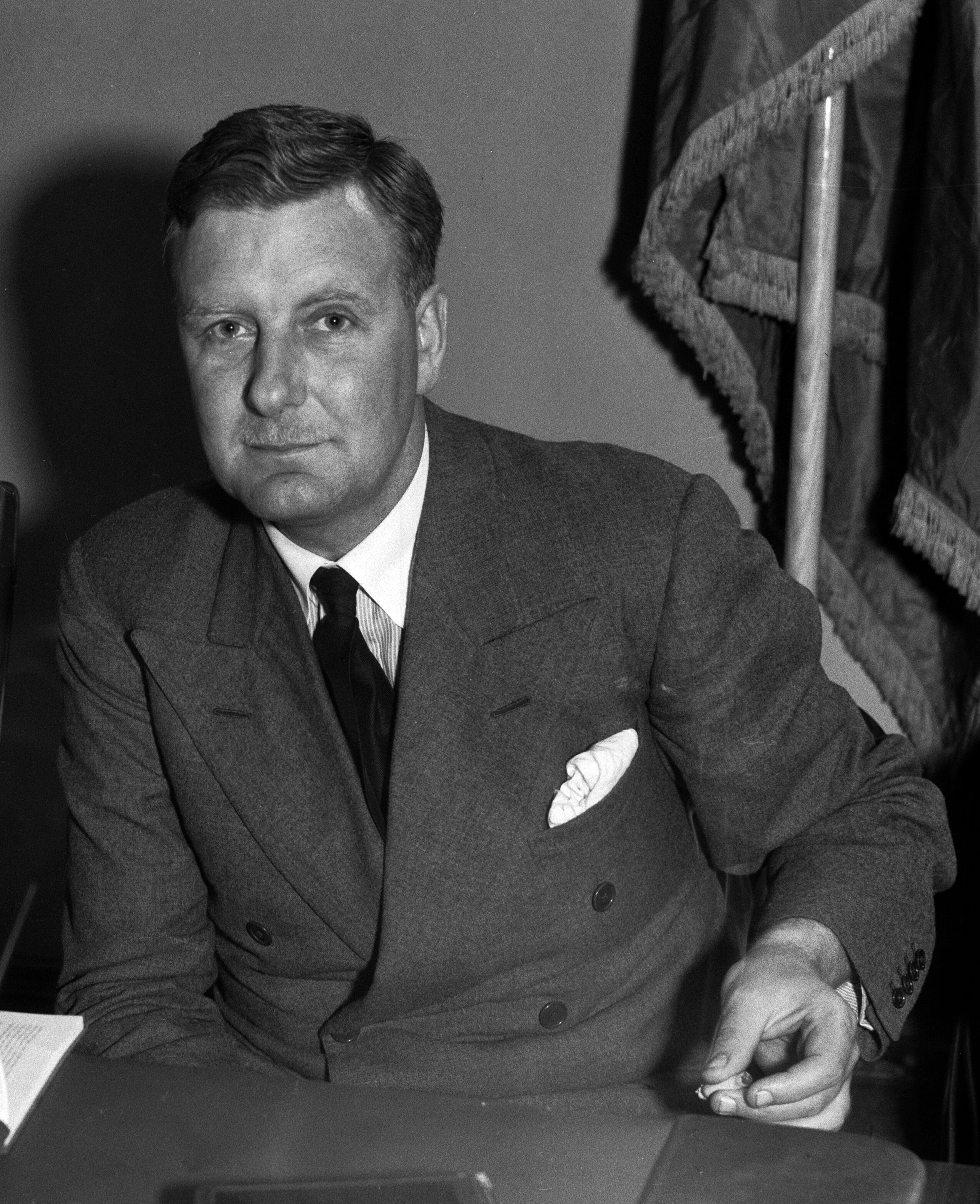
Percy Sillitoe in the 1930s

By 1954 Ian Fleming had published two fictional novels featuring the character James Bond: Casino Royale in 1953 and Live and Let Die in 1954. He wrote his third novel, Moonraker, in January and February 1954. (Note: Moonraker was published in April 1955.) Fleming was on the staff of The Sunday Times as both a writer and the paper's foreign manager, dealing with the foreign coverage of the paper, including appointing correspondents. That year he read a story in The Sunday Times about diamond smuggling from Sierra Leone; he considered this topic as the possible subject for a new Bond novel. He contacted Philip Brownrigg, an old friend from Eton and a senior executive of De Beers. Brownrigg arranged for Fleming to visit the London Diamond Club to see diamonds being sorted and polished. Brownrigg also arranged for Fleming to meet Sir Percy Sillitoe, the former head of MI5, and then the head of the IDSO. Much of the research was used as background material for Fleming's 1956 Bond novel, Diamonds Are Forever.

Fleming retained an interest in diamond smuggling and when Sillitoe suggested to Denis Hamilton, the editor of The Sunday Times, that the paper might want to publish a story on the IDSO, Hamilton asked Fleming to rewrite it. (Note: Raymond Benson, in The James Bond Bedside Companion, and the Anglicist Robert Druce report that Collard wrote the story first and that Hamilton thought it needed rewriting by a professional.) Sillitoe also offered his deputy, the retired MI5 officer John Collard, as liaison for Fleming to interview. During the Second World War Collard had assisted in the planning of Operation Overlord—the Allied landings in Normandy during the Second World War—as part of MI11, the department of the British Directorate of Military Intelligence responsible for counter-intelligence. At the war's end he joined MI5 under Sillitoe and played a major role in the capture and conviction of the atomic spy Klaus Fuchs. In 1954 Sillitoe asked him to work for the IDSO.

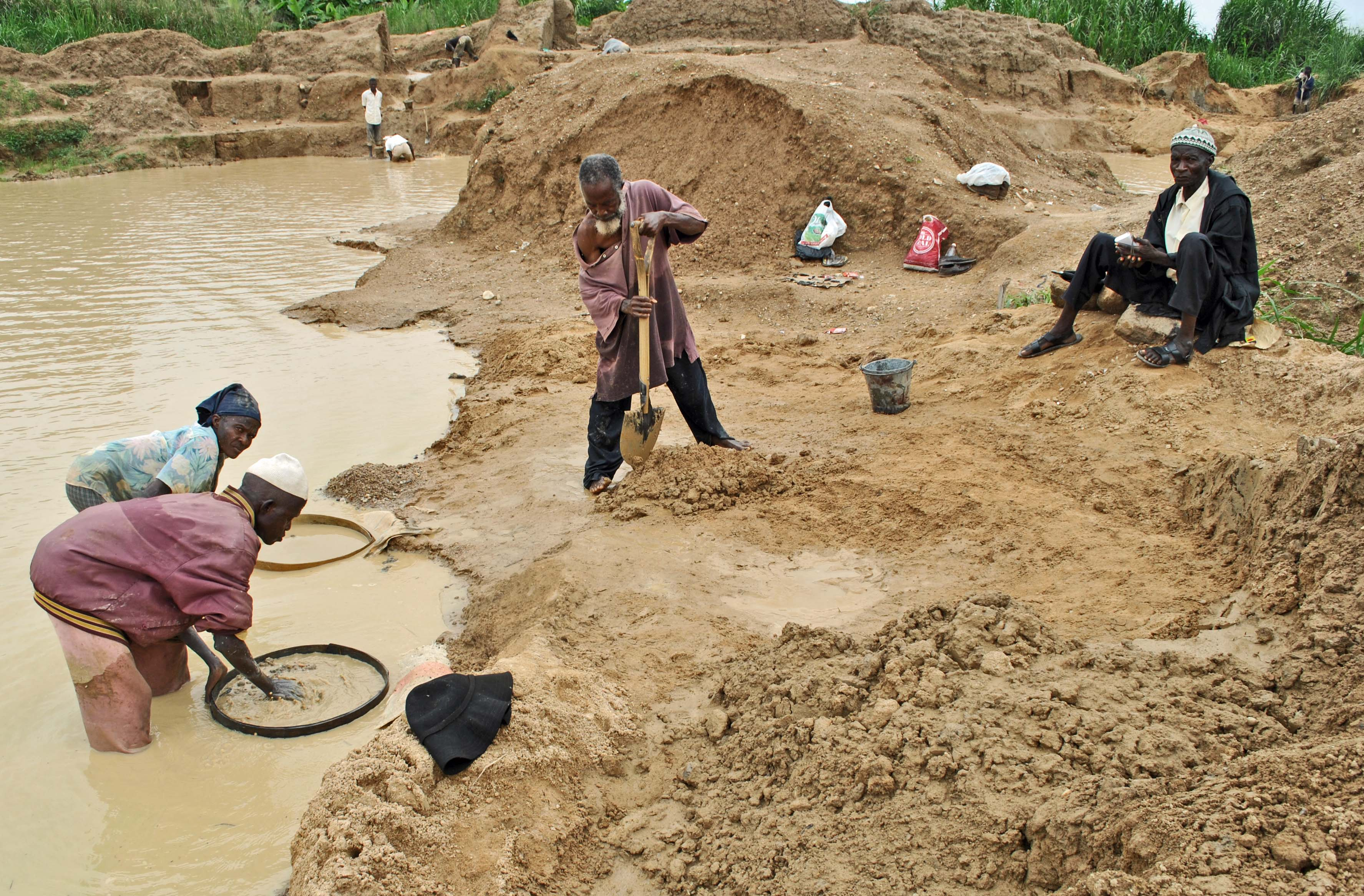
Sierra Leonean miners sieving for diamonds in 2011

Fleming and Collard met in Tangier, Morocco, on 13 April 1957. Fleming considered Collard to be a "reluctant hero, like all Britain's best secret agents" who

... had common sense, a passion for accuracy and a knowledge of men and how to use them which would have brought him to the top of, for instance, the Civil Service. But he also had a taste for adventure and a romantic streak which in the Civil Service would have been sublimated into mountain climbing and amateur theatricals.

Fleming spread a story around the English-speaking community at Tangier that Collard was an expert on the coelacanth and that they were writing a story about the fish. The pair spent two weeks discussing the issue of diamond smuggling, with Collard explaining what happened in South Africa and Sierra Leone, using a series of notes he had written beforehand. Fleming would then dictate an average of 5,000 words a day to a secretary.

In April 1957 Fleming sent the manuscript to the writer William Plomer for proofreading, as he did with all the Bond novels. In his correspondence with Plomer he referred to the book by its provisional title, The Diamond Spy, and said it was 40,000 words, but the final work would also include maps and photographs. (Note: The name The Diamond Spy remained in place until at least August 1957.) Bip Pares made the maps for the work and one of them was also published in The Sunday Times. Plomer made several comments on the manuscript, including marking two passages he thought needed to be reworked because they may have been libellous.

Fleming worked on the manuscript over the summer of 1957. He sent proof copies to the chairmen of De Beers and Selection Trust—the owner of several West African mining companies. Some minor changes were requested but he was told that they were generally happy with the results. Sillitoe telephoned Fleming shortly afterwards, as he had been contacted by the diamond companies and come under pressure for changes to be made. De Beers objected to a number of areas and threatened an injunction against Fleming and The Sunday Times, which resulted in much material being removed. Sillitoe provided an introduction to the book, but as this was not approved by the Anglo American Corporation—De Beers's parent company—it was not published and Collard wrote one instead. (Note: Sillitoe wrote his own account of his work with the IDSO in his 1955 memoir Cloak Without Dagger.) Fleming was disappointed in the final product and in his personal copy of the book, he wrote "It was a good story until all the possible libel was cut out. ... It is adequate journalism but a poor book and necessarily rather 'contrived' though the facts are true".

The Sunday Times serialised the book over six weeks, running illustrated articles between 15 September and 20 October 1957. The book contains more content than the articles and none of the material from chapter eight, "The Heart of the Matter", was included in the newspaper.

== Publication and reception ==
=== Publication history ===
The Diamond Smugglers was published in book form in the UK on 29 November 1957 by Jonathan Cape; it was 160 pages long and cost 12 shillings 6d. (Note: 12 shillings 6d. in 1957 is approximately equivalent to £10 in 2025, according to calculations based on the Consumer Price Index measure of inflation.) There were 9,600 copies in the first print run. In February 1960 Pan Books published a paperback version of The Diamond Smugglers in the UK; it cost 2s. 6d. and the print run was 50,000 copies. (Note: 2 shillings 6d in 1960 is approximately equivalent to £3 in 2025, according to calculations based on the Consumer Price Index measure of inflation.) A second print run of 125,000 copies was needed by October 1963. The book was published in the US on 13 May 1958 by Macmillan and cost $3.50; there were very few changes from the British version. (Note: $3.50 in 1957 is approximately equivalent to $41 in 2025, according to calculations based on the United States Consumer Price Index measure of inflation.) A paperback version was released in the US in 1964 by Collier Books. The Diamond Smugglers was one of only two non-fiction books published by Fleming; the second was the 1963 travelogue Thrilling Cities.

=== Critical reception ===
The Diamond Smugglers received mixed reviews. Several reviewers thought the subject one of interest, including Michael Crampton, writing for The Sunday Times, who thought it an "exciting and richly fascinating account", and John Barkham, who reviewed the book for The New York Times, who thought that although the subject was interesting, the result was "a choppy book". The Times Literary Supplement obtained the services of the Earl of Cardigan to review the book. He noted that "the book is put together with a skill one would expect from Mr. Fleming", which leads to "very entertaining reading". Sampson thought the book had "sparkle", adding that "it is often difficult to remember that we are not listening to his old hero Mr. James Bond". The reviewer for The Economist also thought the subject was interesting, but considered that while many of the stories "make good reading ... they are not new" and that many had already appeared in the courts.

Several reviewers thought that Fleming had written a book that, while "ringing true as fact, is at the same time as highly entertaining as any fiction", as Crampton described it. (Note: Aside from Cramton, others who referred to this in their reviews were Anthony Sampson in The Observer, John Barkham in The New York Times and Ted Saunders in The Age.) Reviewing for The Observer, Anthony Sampson thought that the book included "several yarns which are worthy of the best spy-stories". The writer Dan Jacobson, who reviewed the book for The Spectator, considered the operations described to be dull in nature, and that Fleming had struggled to make them interesting and this resulted in a work that attempted the atmosphere of a thriller but with material that did not lend itself to high adventure.

== Attempted film adaptation ==
Shortly after publication The Rank Organisation offered £13,500 for the film rights to The Diamond Smugglers, which Fleming accepted, telling them he would write a full story outline for an extra £1,000. (Note: £13,500 in 1957 is approximately equivalent to £282,760 and £1,000 is approximately equivalent to £20,940 in 2025, according to calculations based on the Consumer Price Index measure of inflation.) Several contemporary newspaper reports referred to the project as "The Diamond Spy". The producer George Willoughby and the actor Richard Todd obtained the rights for the book from Rank. (Note: One report stated that Todd had acquired the rights directly from Fleming in 1964.) Todd and Willoughby commissioned a screenplay from the writer Jon Cleary, who finished writing a script in October 1964 that remained faithful in spirit to Fleming's book while also featuring elements familiar from the James Bond films. The writer Kingsley Amis was also hired as a story consultant; in a letter to the author Theo Richmond in December 1965 Amis wrote that he was having "a horrible time" writing an outline for Willoughby. Bill Canaway, the co-author of the screenplay for The Ipcress File, was also hired to work on the script. The film director John Boorman was briefly involved. Despite interest from Anglo-Amalgamated Film Distributors and Anglo Embassy Productions in early 1966, the project was shelved later that year.

== Notes and references ==
=== Sources ===
==== Books ====
- Amis, Kingsley (2000). Zachary Leader (ed.). The Letters of Kingsley Amis. London: HarperCollins. ISBN 978-0-0025-7095-4.
- Benson, Raymond (1988). The James Bond Bedside Companion. London: Boxtree Ltd. ISBN 978-1-8528-3233-9.
- Chancellor, Henry (2005). James Bond: The Man and His World. London: John Murray. ISBN 978-0-7195-6815-2.
- Chilvers, Hedley A. (1939). The Story of De Beers. London: Cassell and Co. OCLC 3386941.
- Cockerill, A. W. (1975). Sir Percy Sillitoe. London: W. H. Allen. ISBN 978-0-4910-1702-2.
- Druce, Robert (1992). This Day our Daily Fictions: An Enquiry into the Multi-Million Bestseller Status of Enid Blyton and Ian Fleming. Amsterdam: Rodopi. ISBN 978-9-0518-3401-7.
- Falls, Susan (2014). Clarity, Cut and Culture: The Many Meanings of Diamonds. London: New York University Press. ISBN 978-1-4798-7990-8.
- Fleming, Fergus (2015). The Man with the Golden Typewriter: Ian Fleming's James Bond Letters. New York: Bloomsbury. ISBN 978-1-6328-6489-5.
- Fleming, Ian (1 January 1960). The Diamond Smugglers. London: Pan Books. OCLC 561009926.
- Gilbert, Jon (2012). Ian Fleming: The Bibliography. London: Queen Anne Press. ISBN 978-0-9558-1897-4.
- Lycett, Andrew (1996). Ian Fleming. London: Phoenix. ISBN 978-1-8579-9783-5.
- Parker, Matthew (2014). Goldeneye. London: Hutchinson. ISBN 978-0-0919-5410-9.
- Pearson, John (1967). The Life of Ian Fleming: Creator of James Bond. London: Jonathan Cape. OCLC 923185831.

==== Inflation calculations ====
- Clark, Gregory (2023). "The Annual RPI and Average Earnings for Britain, 1209 to Present (New Series)". MeasuringWorth. Archived from the original on 1 April 2023.
- McCusker, John J. (January 1996a). "How Much Is That in Real Money? A Historical Price Index for Use as a Deflator of Money Values in the Economy of the United States: Addenda et Corrigenda" (PDF). Proceedings of the American Antiquarian Society. 106 (2): 327–334.
- McCusker, John J. (October 1996b). "How Much Is That in Real Money? A Historical Price Index for Use as a Deflator of Money Values in the Economy of the United States" (PDF). American Antiquarian Society. 106 (2): 327–334.
- "Consumer Price Index, 1800–". Federal Reserve Bank of Minneapolis.

==== Journals and magazines ====
- "All that Glitters". The Economist. Vol. 185, no. 5964. 14 December 1957. pp. 955–956.
- "International Sound Track". Variety. 236 (1): 14. 26 August 1964.
- Jacobson, Dan (13 December 1957). "Not so Sparkling". The Spectator. Vol. 199, no. 6755. pp. 844–845.
- "Joe's Ian". Films and Filming. 12 (3): 47. 1966.

==== Newspapers ====
- Barkham, John (22 June 1958). "Dark Dees and Glittering Gems". The New York Times. p. BR17.
- Brudenell-Bruce, Cedric (17 January 1958). "The Lure of Diamonds". The Times Literary Supplement. London. p. 33.
- Crampton, Michael (1 December 1957). "Smuggling the Sparklers". The Sunday Times. London. p. 8.
- Duns, Jeremy (7 March 2010). "Ian Fleming's Book About Gem Smuggling in South Africa is as Thrilling as Bond, and Should Have Been a Blockbuster Film Starring Steve McQueen. So What Went Wrong?". The Sunday Times. London. pp. 4–5.
- Fleming, Ian (15 September 1957a). "The Diamond Smugglers: The Million Carat Network". The Sunday Times. London. pp. 12–13.
- Fleming, Ian (20 October 1957b). "The Diamond Smugglers: 'Monsieur Diamant'". The Sunday Times. London. p. 11.
- "John Collard". The Times. London. 13 November 2002. p. 38.
- Sampson, Anthony (15 December 1957). "Monsieur Diamant". The Observer. London. p. 12.
- Saunders, Ted (1 March 1958). "Tracking Down the Diamond Smugglers: A Three Years' Investigation". The Age. p. 20.

==== Websites ====
- "Ian Fleming's James Bond Titles". Ian Fleming Publications. Archived from the original on 10 August 2015.
- Simkins, Anthony (2004). "Sillitoe, Sir Percy Joseph". Oxford Dictionary of National Biography (online ed.). Oxford University Press. doi:10.1093/ref:odnb/36092. (Subscription, Wikipedia Library access or UK public library membership required.)
