= Eve Palmer =

South African writer and botanist

- Born: Evelyn Mary "Eve" Palmer; 20 February 1916; Karoo
- Died: 1998 (aged 81–82); Pretoria
- Occupation: Writer

Evelyn Mary "Eve" Palmer (20 February 1916 – 1998) was a South African writer and botanist. She was married to the South African journalist and adventure novelist Geoffrey Jenkins. Her best known work is her bestselling 1966 non-fiction book The Plains of Camdeboo.

== Life and career ==
Palmer was born in the Karoo Desert of South Africa to Clifford George Palmer - a rancher - and Kate (née Uglig) Palmer.

Palmer studied journalism at the University College, London and received a Diploma in Journalism in 1937. After graduating, Palmer toured the United States. Among her stops was the Grand Coulee Dam which she wrote about for the Capetown News.

Palmer also reported for The Rhodesia Herald and Pretoria News. She then edited the earliest issues of the Veldtrust, a conservationist magazine and the official publication of the National Veld Trust. Palmer was a member of the Royal Society of South Africa, National Veld Trust, Botanical Society of South Africa, Wild Life Society, Royal Horticultural Society, and the Rose Society.

After the war Palmer met fellow journalist and future novelist Geoffrey Jenkins when they both reported for The Rhodesia Herald. They married on 17 March 1950. They have a son named David.

Her best known work remains The Plains of Camdeboo, which she published in 1966. It is about Cranemere farm where five generations of her family have lived. The book traces the region's history from "dinosaurs and early hominids to trekkers and sheep farmers", It is also "an account of her life at Cranemere, the Palmer family's vast ranch in a South African desert, and the struggle to tame the land." Journalist Justin Fox describes the book as "an evocative piece of writing that captures the essence of the Camdeboo." The book was an almost instant bestseller and remains in print.

Palmer wrote numerous botanical works. Jeanette Eve has said that Palmer "could write with a novelist's gift for narrative and a poet's gift for lyricism. As a botanist, she could also write with a scientist's gift for accuracy. [Her] recreations of the landscapes of her early home are among the finest in Karoo literature."

Palmer and Jenkins lived in Pretoria for many decades.

Palmer died in 1998.

== Works ==
Books

- Our Land (c. 1950), with Norah Massey (a.k.a. Norah Pitman)
- Trees of South Africa (1961), with Norah Pitman
- The Plains of Camdeboo (1966)
- Trees of Southern Africa (1972), with Norah Pitman, illustrated by Rhona Collett, photographs by Geoffrey Jenkins et al. (3 vols.; a revised version of the 1961 work Trees of South Africa)
- A Field Guide to the Trees of Southern Africa (1972, reissued in 1977), illustrated by Rhona Collett
- The Companion Guide to South Africa (1978), with Geoffrey Jenkins
- The South African Herbal (1985), illustrated by Brenda Clarke
- Under the Olive: A Book of Garden Pleasures (1989), illustrated by Brenda Clarke
- Return to Camdeboo: A Century's Karoo Foods and Flavours (1992), illustrated by Brenda Clarke
- A Gardener's Year (1995)

Journalism

- Journey to Pretoria in 1878: Diary of Mrs. Bousfield, wife of the City's first bishop (c.1975)

== Awards ==
- 1978: the South African Botanical Society honoured her with the Bolus Medal for her "outstanding" works on indigenous trees
- 1986: the Recht Malan Prize, for The South African Herbal
