= Rhona Brown =

South African artist (1922–2014)

- Born: September 23, 1922
- Died: March 14, 2014 (aged 91)
- Citizenship: South Africa
- Education: University of Natal, (BA,FA)
- Occupation: Botanical Artist

Rhona Brown (September 23, 1922 - March 14, 2014), was a South African botanical artist.

Brown was educated at University of Natal in Pietermaritzburg and UNISA graduating with a B.A.(Hons.) in Fine Arts and with a National Art Teachers Certificate. She worked at the Botanical Research Institute in Pretoria for two spells - 1944-46 and 1965–69 and taught sporadically for eight years. She completed some 100 plates for the Flowering Plants of Africa and black-and-white illustrations for Bothalia and Flora of Southern Africa. She provided about half of all illustrations for Palmer & Pitman's Trees of Southern Africa and all the illustrations for Eve Palmer's Field Guide to the Trees of Southern Africa.

She married Comdt. Horatio Theophilus Collett on 2 March 1946.

== Publications ==
- 1972 Trees of Southern Africa by Eve Palmer & Norah Pitman, illustrated By Rhona Collett (3 vols.) ISBN 0-86961-033-3
- 1977 A Field Guide to the Trees of Southern Africa by Eve Palmer, illustrated By Rhona Collett (William Collins & Sons Ltd.) ISBN 0-00-219339-6
- Calligraphy Teachers Manual - Rhona Collett et al.
