= Per Fine Ounce =

Book by Geoffrey Jenkins

- Author: Geoffrey Jenkins
- Language: English
- Series: James Bond
- Genre: Spy novel
- Publication date: Unpublished; written c.1966
- Publication place: United Kingdom
- Media type: Manuscript

Per Fine Ounce is the title of an unpublished novel by Geoffrey Jenkins featuring Ian Fleming's James Bond. It was completed c.1966 and is considered a "lost" novel by fans of James Bond because it was actually commissioned by Glidrose Productions, the official publishers of James Bond. It was rejected for publication, however, missing the opportunity to become the first continuation James Bond novel.

== History ==
Viscount Kemsley gave Geoffrey Jenkins a job in the Foreign Department of Kemsley Newspapers, owned by the London Sunday Times. There, he worked with Ian Fleming, Foreign Manager of the department, and the two men became friends. In 1965 while researching his book, The Life of Ian Fleming, Jenkins revealed in a letter to John Pearson that in the late 1950s he had discussed the idea of a James Bond novel set in South Africa with Fleming. Jenkins even wrote a synopsis of it which Fleming had very much liked. Fleming had said he would come to South Africa to research the book but died he before he could. Pearson was understandably excited to learn this, and even more so when he found Jenkins' synopsis in Fleming's papers.

At the same time, Glidrose were considering the idea of asking other authors to continue writing James Bond novels, a notion that Fleming's wife, Ann, was against, but his brother, Peter Fleming, who at the time was Glidrose's director, favoured. In November 1965, Jenkins met with Harry Saltzman, co-producer of the James Bond films between 1962 and 1974, and Charles Tyrell from Glidrose to discuss the possibility of his making his South African synopsis into the first James Bond "continuation" novel. Negotiations were protracted, but Jenkins was formally granted permission to write the book on May 12, 1966; a contract was drawn up on August 24, 1966, which stated that Jenkins would be entitled to a percentage of profits in any film made from the novel, but not from any related merchandise that might come about.

Not much is known of the plot for Per Fine Ounce. The reference work The Bond Files by Andy Lane and Paul Simpson indicates that it was based upon a story Jenkins claimed he and Fleming had worked on around 1957, and that the storyline was set in South Africa and dealt with diamond smugglers and a spy ring and bore some resemblance to Fleming's Bond novel Diamonds Are Forever as well as his non-Bond work, The Diamond Smugglers. However, in an interview with Kiss Kiss Bang Bang magazine published in 2005, Peter Janson-Smith, Fleming's former literary agent and former chairman of Glidrose, claimed that he believed the story may have been about gold. This makes more sense, as the title derives from the line "per fine Troy ounce" or a variation of. A fine ounce is a Troy ounce of not quite pure gold. Jenkins' synopsis found by John Pearson in Fleming's papers featured gold bicycle chains, baobab tree coffins and the magical Lake Fundudzi—presumably, Jenkins used some or all of these elements in the book itself. Four draft pages of the manuscript were discovered in 2005, in which we learn that the Double-O Section has been closed down and James Bond defies M on a matter of principle, resigning from MI6 to pursue his mission in South Africa alone.

Despite such promising-sounding material, and the fact that Jenkins was a best-selling thriller writer in the Fleming mould, had been a friend and colleague of Fleming's and had apparently had his blessing and input for the project, Glidrose rejected Jenkins' submitted manuscript. Peter Janson-Smith later recalled that he thought it was badly written, although he admitted that Glidrose may have been "stricter in those days."

A copy of the manuscript is rumoured to exist in the archives of Ian Fleming Publications (renamed from Glidrose in 1998); however, Peter Janson-Smith has said that he doesn't believe Ian Fleming Publications still holds a copy and that the most likely scenario is that the manuscript was returned for legal reasons (so as to not be sued in the future for plagiarism if a book with a similar plot is used). Jenkins' contract with Glidrose gave him a licence to reuse the material in the novel in the event of its rejection, with the proviso that he could not use any of Fleming's characters. Jenkins may have done this: his 1973 novel A Cleft of Stars, while not containing any rogue British secret agents, is set in almost precisely the same area of South Africa, involves diamonds and gold, and has the hero temporarily hiding in a baobab tree.

In 2005, Titan Books published a reprint of a comic strip based upon Colonel Sun. The introduction states that in the mid-1970s, Kingsley Amis lobbied for Eon Productions (producers of the Bond film franchise) to produce a film based upon his book. Reportedly he was told that Saltzman had forbidden that any film be made based on Colonel Sun due to Glidrose refusing to publish Per Fine Ounce a decade earlier.

In 2010, previously unreleased extracts from the "lost" Jenkins manuscript Per Fine Ounce were released exclusively on James Bond website MI6. The extract reveals 007's traditional briefing with "M".

== See also ==
- Outline of James Bond

== Sources ==
- Duns, Jeremy. "Gold Dust", Kiss Kiss Bang Bang magazine, Issue 2 (Winter 2005), pp. 39–47
- Lane, Andy and Paul Simpson. The Bond Files: An Unofficial Guide to the World's Greatest Secret Agent revised edition. London: Virgin Books, 2000; p. 433.
- Page, James. "The Genesis of Colonel Sun" in James Bond 007: Colonel Sun. London: Titan Books, 2005; np.
