= Honor Tracy =

British novelist and travel writer (1913–1989)

Honor Tracy (19 October 1913 – 13 June 1989) was a British writer of novels and travel literature.

== Life and career ==
Tracy was born Honor Lilbush Wingfield Tracy in 1913 in Bury St Edmunds, Suffolk, one of four children of a surgeon, Humphrey Wingfield Tracy, and an artist, Chrystabel Miner. After an education at the Grove School, London, and overseas in Dresden and Paris, she worked first as an assistant in a London publishing house and then for Metro-Goldwyn-Mayer's London office.

On the outbreak of the Second World War in 1939, Tracy joined the Women's Auxiliary Air Force, and worked in its intelligence department until 1941. She was then attached to the Ministry of Information as a specialist on Japan for the remainder of the war. She worked for The Observer newspaper as a columnist and as a long-time foreign correspondent. She wrote also for the Sunday Times and for the British Broadcasting Corporation.

After the war, Tracy spent two years in Ireland working for the Irish Digest and for The Bell magazine, alongside her lover Seán Ó Faoláin. In 1947, she went to France and then roamed East Europe for the Observer. In 1948 she went to Japan for eight months and on her return to Ireland wrote Kakemono, an account of her travels there. She was described as "a brilliant linguist (she speaks French, German, Russian, Italian and some Japanese)", which assisted her greatly in her travel writing.

Tracy then became a newspaper correspondent in Dublin. During this period, she was the subject of a lawsuit by Maurice O'Connell, parish priest of Doneraile, Cork, who claimed he had been libelled by a pointed article Tracy had written in the Sunday Times about the new parochial house which he was building. The newspaper settled with O'Connell. Tracy then sued the newspaper and was awarded £3000 in damages.

Tracy is best known as a travel writer. Her best-known travel book is Winter in Castille (1973). Her novels satirise British-Irish relations and Ireland itself with wit and occasionally bitterness. Her best-known novels are The Straight and Narrow Path (1956), The Quiet End of Evening (1972), and The Ballad of Castle Reef (1979). Harold Watts stated that "her novels are designed to be read with a glass of sherry in the hand, preferably in the company of persons as basically sensible as the ideal reader of Miss Tracy's work."

A convert to Catholicism, she lived for many years in Achill Island, County Mayo, Ireland but died in 1989 in a nursing home in Oxford, England. She had been married briefly and divorced and had no children.

== Betjeman hoax ==
A. N. Wilson's biography of Sir John Betjeman, published in August 2006, included a letter to Tracy which purported to be by Betjeman detailing a previously unknown love affair. They had worked together at the Admiralty during the war. The letter turned out to be a hoax on Wilson, containing an acrostic spelling out an insulting message to him.

== Bibliography ==
=== Travel works ===
Her travel works include:

- Kakemono: A Sketchbook of Postwar Japan (1950)
- Mind You, I've Said Nothing! (1953)
- Silk Hats and No Breakfast (Random House, 1957)
- Spanish Leaves (1964)
- Winter in Castile (1973)
- The Heart of England (1983)

=== Novels ===
Tracy's novels include:

- The Deserters (1954)
- The Straight and Narrow Path (London, Methuen / New York, Random House 1956)
- The Prospects Are Pleasing (1958)
- A Number of Things (Methuen / Random House, 1960)
- A Season of Mists (Methuen / Random House, 1961)
- The First Day of Friday (Methuen / Random House, 1963)
- Men at Work (Methuen / Random House, 1967)
- The Beauty of the World (Methuen / Random House, 1967)
- Settled in Chambers (Methuen / Random House 1968)
- Butterflies of the Province (New York, Random House /London, Eyre Methuen, 1970)
- The Quiet End of Evening (Random House / Eyre Methuen, 1972)
- The Ballad of Castle Reef (1979)
