= Molly Peters =

English actress and model

Mollie Peters
- Peters in Thunderball (1965)
- Born: Vivien Mollie Rudderham; 15 March 1939; Walsham-le-Willows, Suffolk, England
- Died: 29 May 2017 (aged 78); Taunton, Somerset, England
- Occupations: Actress, model
- Years active: 1964–1972
- Known for: As Patricia Fearing in Thunderball (1965)
- Children: 2

Mollie Peters (15 March 1939 – 29 May 2017), born Vivien Mollie Rudderham, was an English actress and model best known for her role as Bond girl Patricia Fearing in the James Bond film Thunderball.

== Career ==
Molly Peters started out as a model and was discovered by film director Terence Young.

She appeared in several films during the 1960s. Her best-known appearance was the role of Bond girl, Patricia Fearing or Pat, a nurse who takes care of James Bond (Sean Connery) while he is on holiday at her health clinic in Thunderball (1965). Peters was the first Bond girl to be seen taking her clothes off on screen in the Bond series.

Peters appeared in Playboy, in the November 1965 issue. Her appearance was as part of a pictorial essay titled "James Bond's Girls", by Richard Maibaum.

According to the special edition DVD of Thunderball, Peters' short film career was the result of a disagreement between her and her agent. The specifics of the disagreement were not revealed, other than according to Peters, her agent at the time of Thunderball held her to her contract agreement of representation because of the mega-successful box-office hit of the fourth James Bond film in 1965. It was only many years later, when the fame, the glamour and the chaos from the release of Thunderball had faded, that her contractual agreement ended; and so had any modelling and/or film prospects.

== Personal life ==
When she was young, she gave birth to a daughter, whom she gave up for adoption. Peters later married and lived with her husband in Ipswich, Suffolk. She and her husband had a son, who died in 2013. In 2011, Peters suffered a mild stroke.

== Death ==
Peters died on 29 May 2017, at the age of 78 at Taunton Hospital, Somerset.

== Filmography ==
=== Films ===
Year	Title	Role	Notes
1964	Peter Studies Form		
1965	The Amorous Adventures of Moll Flanders	Girl	
1965	Thunderball	Patricia Fearing	
1966	Target for Killing	Vera	
1967	The Naked World of Harrison Marks	Molly Peters	
1968	Don't Raise the Bridge, Lower the River	Heath's Secretary	
1971	Zeppelin	Barmaid	
1972	Nobody Ordered Love	Secretary	

=== Television ===
Year	Title	Role	Notes
1966	Das Experiment	Junges Mädchen	
1967	Armchair Theatre	Waitress	Episode: "Easier in the Dark"
1967	Baker's Half-Dozen	The Girl	5 episodes
