= John Barkham (writer) =

South African-American book critic

- Born: 1908; South Africa
- Died: 15 April 1998 (aged 89–90); Sarasota, Florida, US
- Occupation: Book critic
- Years active: 1939–1998

John Barkham (1908 – 15 April 1998) was a South African-born American syndicated writer (book reviewer) for Time, New York Times Book Review, New York World-Telegram, and New York Post who published several thousand book reviews in over half a century of work (as many as five per week).

== Background ==
Barkham was born in South Africa and spent his childhood on an ostrich farm in Cape Province, South Africa.

== Career ==
About 1939, Time hired him as a stringer. He then became Cairo bureau chief. Around August 1944, when Whittaker Chambers became Foreign News editor at Time, the magazine brought him to New York. Chambers considered Barkham (and Marjorie Smith, researcher) his right and left hands in Foreign News.

In 1950, he became a book reviewer at the Saturday Review.

By 1951, he was an editor at Coronet magazine.

Over the next three decades, he wrote reviews for the New York Times Book Review, New York World-Telegram, and New York Post. He also interviewed authors.

"He concentrated on contemporary history and books about Africa, particularly about his native South Africa," The New York Times noted at time of death.

He served for 20 years as a Pulitzer Prize juror (fiction, nonfiction, biography).

He served as governor of the Overseas Press Club.

At time of death, he was a trustee of the Carnegie Fund for Authors.

== Personal and death ==
Barkham married Margot Buirski; they had a son, Graham and a daughter, Jennifer.

Whittaker Chambers praised his "unfailing loyalty, patience, evenness of temper, kindness" and "courage.. (which) sometime gave me about all the courage I had to go on."

He died age 90 on 15 April 1998, at a nursing home in Sarasota, Florida, US.
