= Norman Wanstall =

British sound editor

- Born: 1935 (age 90–91); Brentford, Middlesex, England
- Occupation: Sound editor
- Years active: 1957–1983

Norman Wanstall (born 1935) is a British retired sound editor who did the sound editing for several of the early James Bond films. He won the first Oscar for a James Bond film at the 1964 Academy Awards. He won in the category of Best Sound Editing for the film Goldfinger.

In 2000 he appeared in some making-of features for the James Bond films.
