= 41 Albemarle Street =

Office building in London, England

- Interactive map of the 41 Albemarle Street area

General information
- Type: Office
- Location: London, England
- Coordinates: 51°30′31″N 0°08′30″W
- Completed: 1963

Design and construction
- Architect: Peter Moro

Listed Building – Grade II
- Official name: 41 Albemarle Street, London W1
- Designated: 24 November 1995
- Reference no.: 1242615

41 Albemarle Street is a Grade II listed office building on Albemarle Street in the Mayfair area of London.

== History and description ==
The building was built between 1961 and 1963, designed by Peter Moro with assistance from Michael Mellish. Built for the furniture company Hille, the plans accommodated a showroom on the ground floor with offices above. A roof garden was built with the intent to provide space for the display of garden furniture. A thoroughly modernist design, it resembles elements of Walter Gropius's pavilion at the 1914 Werkbund Exhibition. Barr Gazetas was granted planning permission in 2026 for a refurbishment of the building.

== See also ==
- 45–46 Albemarle Street
