= Goldfinger (novel) =

Novel by Ian Fleming

- First edition cover, published by Jonathan Cape
- Author: Ian Fleming
- Cover artist: Richard Chopping
- Language: English
- Series: James Bond
- Genre: Spy fiction
- Publisher: Jonathan Cape
- Publication date: 23 March 1959
- Publication place: United Kingdom
- Media type: Print (hardback and paperback)
- Pages: 318
- Preceded by: Dr. No
- Followed by: For Your Eyes Only

Goldfinger is the seventh novel in Ian Fleming's James Bond series. Written in January and February 1958, it was first published in the UK by Jonathan Cape on 23 March 1959. The story centres on the investigation by the British Secret Service operative James Bond into the gold-smuggling activities of Auric Goldfinger, who is also suspected by MI6 of being connected to SMERSH, the Soviet counter-intelligence organisation. As well as establishing the background to the smuggling operation, Bond uncovers a much larger plot: Goldfinger plans to steal the gold reserves of the United States from Fort Knox.

Fleming developed the James Bond character in Goldfinger, presenting him as a more complex individual than in the previous novels, and bringing out a theme of Bond as a St George figure. This theme is echoed by the fact that it is a British agent sorting out an American problem. In common with his other Bond stories, Fleming used the names of people he knew, or knew of, throughout his story, including the book's eponymous villain, who was named after the architect Ernő Goldfinger. On learning of the use of his name, Goldfinger threatened to sue, before the matter was settled out of court. Auric Goldfinger is obsessed by gold and is—to Bond's eye—a gauche individual with unusual appetites; Fleming probably based the character on the American gold tycoon Charles W. Engelhard Jr. Fleming also used his own experiences within the book; the round of golf played with Goldfinger was based on a 1957 tournament at the Berkshire Golf Club in which Fleming partnered Peter Thomson, the winner of The Open Championship.

On its release Goldfinger went to the top of the best-seller lists; the novel was broadly well received by the critics and was favourably compared to the works of the thriller writers H. C. McNeile and John Buchan. Goldfinger was serialised as a daily story and as a comic strip in the Daily Express, before it became the third James Bond feature film of the Eon Productions series, released in 1964 and starring Sean Connery as Bond. In 2010 Goldfinger was adapted for BBC Radio with Toby Stephens as Bond and Sir Ian McKellen as Goldfinger.

== Plot ==
Mr Bond, they have a saying in Chicago: "Once is happenstance. Twice is coincidence. The third time it's enemy action." Miami, Sandwich and now Geneva. I propose to wring the truth out of you.

— Goldfinger

Happenstance
While changing planes in Miami after closing down a Mexican heroin-smuggling operation, the British Secret Service operative James Bond meets Junius Du Pont, a rich American businessman whom Bond had briefly met and gambled with in Casino Royale. Du Pont asks Bond to watch Auric Goldfinger, with whom Du Pont is playing canasta, to discover if he is cheating. Bond soon realises that Goldfinger is using his assistant, Jill Masterton, to spy on Du Pont's cards. Bond blackmails Goldfinger into admitting his guilt and paying back Du Pont's lost money; Bond also has a brief liaison with Masterton. Back in London, Bond's superior, M, tasks him with determining how Goldfinger is smuggling gold out of Britain; M also suspects Goldfinger of being connected to SMERSH and financing their western networks with his gold. Bond visits the Bank of England for a briefing on the methods of gold smuggling.

Coincidence
Bond contrives to meet and play a round of golf with Goldfinger; Goldfinger attempts to win the golf match by cheating, but Bond turns the tables on him, beating him in the process. He is subsequently invited to Goldfinger's mansion near Reculver where he narrowly escapes being caught on camera looking through the house. Goldfinger introduces Bond to his factotum, a Korean named Oddjob.

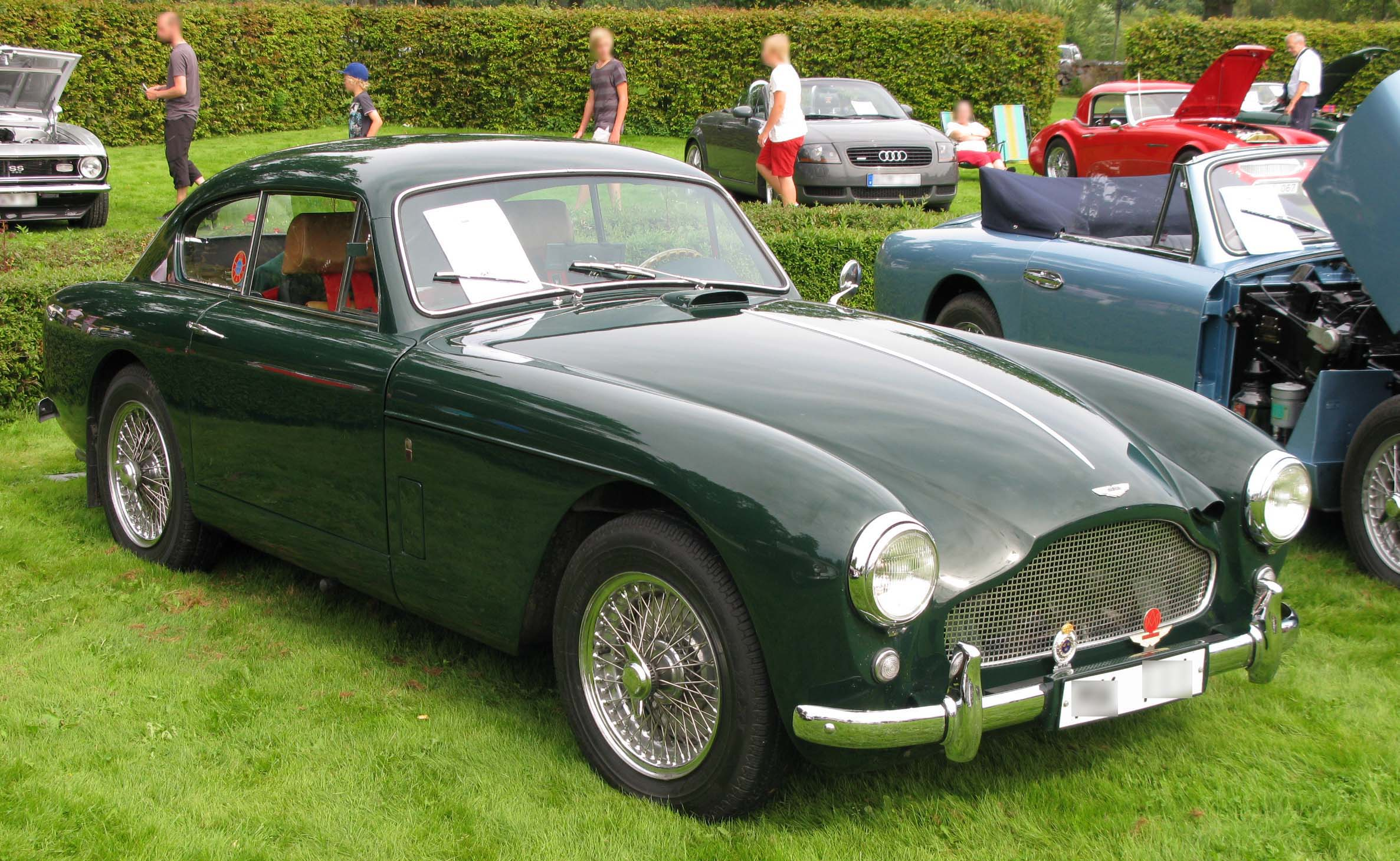
An Aston Martin DB Mark III, as driven by Bond

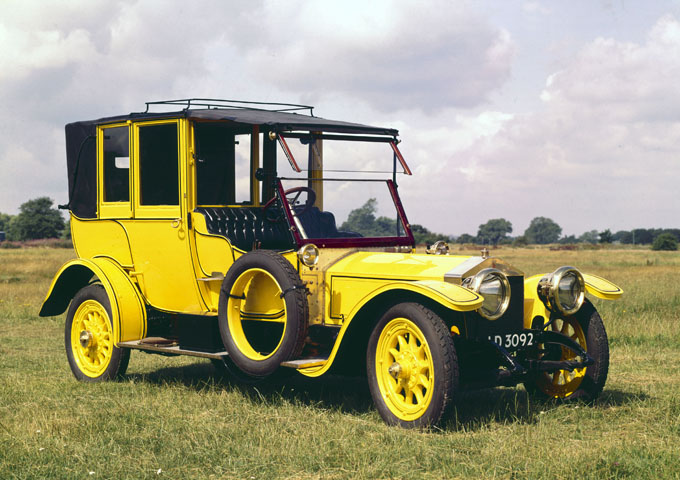
A 1909 Rolls-Royce Silver Ghost, as driven by Goldfinger

Issued by MI6 with an Aston Martin DB Mark III, Bond trails Goldfinger in his vintage Rolls-Royce Silver Ghost (adapted with armour plating and bulletproof glass), driven by Oddjob. Both travel by air ferries to Switzerland. Bond manages to trace Goldfinger to a warehouse in Geneva, where he finds that the armour of the Rolls-Royce is actually white-gold, cast into panels at his Kent refinery. When the car reaches the factory in Switzerland (Enterprises Auric AG), Goldfinger recasts the gold from the armour panels into aircraft seats and fits the seats to the aeroplanes of Mecca Charter Airline, in which he holds a large stake. The gold is finally sold in India at a large profit. Bond foils an assassination attempt on Goldfinger by Jill Masterton's sister, Tilly, to avenge Jill's death at Goldfinger's hands: he had painted her body with gold paint, which killed her. Bond and Tilly attempt to escape when the alarm is raised, but are captured.

Enemy action
Bond is tortured by Oddjob when he refuses to confess his role in trailing Goldfinger. In a desperate attempt to escape being cut in two by a circular saw, Bond offers to work for Goldfinger, a ruse that Goldfinger initially refuses but then accepts. Bond and Tilly are subsequently taken to Goldfinger's operational headquarters in a warehouse in New York City. They are put to work as secretaries for a meeting between Goldfinger and several gangsters (including the Spangled Mob and the Mafia), who have been recruited to assist in "Operation Grand Slam"—stealing gold from the United States Bullion Depository at Fort Knox. One of the gang leaders, Helmut Springer, refuses to join the operation and is killed by Oddjob. Bond learns that the operation includes killing the inhabitants of Fort Knox by introducing poison into the water supply. He manages to conceal a message in the toilet of Goldfinger's private plane, where he hopes it will be found and sent to Pinkertons, where his friend and ex-counterpart Felix Leiter now works.

Operation Grand Slam commences, and it transpires that Leiter has found and acted on Bond's message. A battle commences, but Goldfinger escapes. Tilly, a lesbian, hopes that one of the gang leaders, Pussy Galore (the leader of a gang of lesbian burglars), will protect her, but Tilly is killed by Oddjob. Goldfinger, Oddjob and the Mafia bosses all escape in the melee. Bond is drugged before his flight back to England and wakes to find he has been captured by Goldfinger, who has murdered the crime bosses (except Galore), drugged a BOAC flight crew and hijacked their jetliner. Bond manages to break a window, causing a depressurisation that blows Oddjob out of the plane; he then fights and strangles Goldfinger. At gunpoint, he forces the crew to ditch in the sea near the Canadian coast, where they are rescued by a nearby weather ship.

== Background and writing history ==
By January 1958 the author Ian Fleming had published five novels in the preceding five years: Casino Royale in 1953, Live and Let Die (1954), Moonraker (1955), Diamonds Are Forever (1956) and From Russia, with Love in 1957. A sixth, Dr. No, was being edited and prepared for production. (Note: Dr. No was published at the end of March 1958.) That month Fleming travelled to his Goldeneye estate in Jamaica to write Goldfinger. He followed his usual practice, which he later outlined in Books and Bookmen magazine: "I write for about three hours in the morning ... and I do another hour's work between six and seven in the evening. I never correct anything and I never go back to see what I have written ... By following my formula, you write 2,000 words a day." He returned to London in March that year with a 270-page typescript, the longest he had produced to that time. He initially gave the manuscript the title The Richest Man in the World; few alterations were made to the story before publication.

Although Fleming did not date the events within his novels, John Griswold and Henry Chancellor—both of whom wrote books for Ian Fleming Publications—identified different timelines based on events and situations within the novel series as a whole. Chancellor put the events of Goldfinger in 1957; Griswold is more precise, and considers the story to have taken place from late April to early June that year.

Fleming had long been fascinated with gold. He was a collector of Spanish doubloons, and he commissioned a gold-plated typewriter from the Royal Typewriter Company, although he never actually used it; (Note: In 1995 the gold typewriter was purchased by the actor Pierce Brosnan, who portrayed Bond on screen.) he wrote with a gold-tipped ballpoint pen and included the theft or obtaining of gold in several of his stories. (Note: Gold appears as buried pirate treasure in Live and Let Die, stolen Nazi plunder in the short story "Octopussy" and, in The Man with the Golden Gun, Francisco Scaramanga uses a gold-plated Colt .45 revolver, which fires silver-jacketed solid-gold bullets.) When researching for Goldfinger, Fleming reinforced his knowledge of gold by sending a questionnaire to an expert at the Worshipful Company of Goldsmiths—one of the livery companies of the City of London who assay precious metals for purity—with a list of queries about gold, its properties and the background of the industry, including smuggling.

Fleming had originally conceived the card game scene as a separate short story but instead used the device for Bond and Goldfinger's first encounter. The architect Ernő Goldfinger threatened to sue Fleming over the use of the name. With the book already printed but not released, Fleming threatened to add an erratum slip to the book changing the name from Goldfinger to Goldprick and explaining why; the matter was settled out of court after the publishers, Jonathan Cape, paid Ernő's legal costs, agreed to ensure the name Auric was always used in conjunction with Goldfinger and sent him six copies of the novel.

Once Fleming completed the novel—which he found the easiest of all the Bond books to write—he thought he had exhausted his inspiration for plots. He told the writer William Plomer—his friend who proof-read all the Bond books—that Goldfinger was to be "the last full length folio on Bond ... Though I may be able to think up some episodes for him in the future, I shall never be able to give him 70,000 words again".

== Development ==
=== Plot inspirations ===
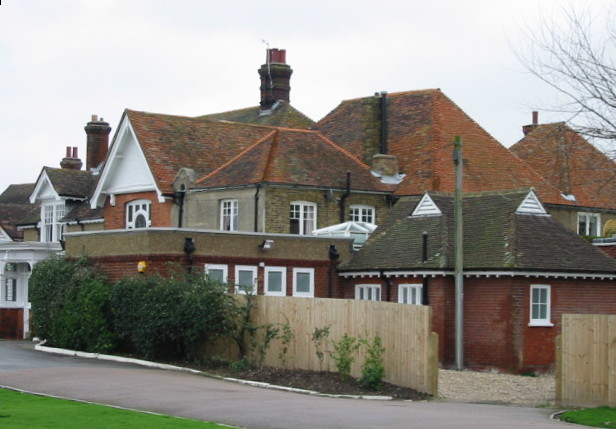
The clubhouse at Royal St George's Golf Club

Fleming based some points in the book on events he had read about. The pre-First World War death of a showgirl in Europe after she had covered herself in paint was one such idea, and the depressurisation of Goldfinger's plane was a plot device Fleming had intended to use elsewhere, but which he included in Goldfinger. Some years previously a plane had depressurised over the Lebanon and an American passenger had been sucked out of the window; Fleming, who was not a comfortable airline passenger, had made note of the incident to use it. As he had done in previous Bond novels, Fleming used the names of several friends or associates in the novel. The surname of Sir John Masterman, the MI5 agent and Oxford academic who ran the double-cross system during the Second World War, was used as the basis for the Masterton sisters; Alfred Whiting, the golf professional at Royal St George's Golf Club, Sandwich, became Alfred Blacking; while the Royal St George's Golf Club itself became the Royal St Mark's, for the game between Bond and Goldfinger.

In June 1957 Fleming played in the Bowmaker Pro-Am golf tournament at the Berkshire Golf Club, where he partnered Peter Thomson, the winner of The Open Championship; much of the background went into the match between Bond and Goldfinger. One of Fleming's neighbours in Jamaica, and later his lover, was Blanche Blackwell; Fleming used Blanche as the model for Pussy Galore, although the name "Pussy" came from Mrs "Pussy" Deakin, formerly Livia Stela, an SOE agent and friend of Fleming's wife Ann.

Fleming's golf partner, John Blackwell (a cousin to Blanche Blackwell), was also a cousin by marriage to Ernő Goldfinger and disliked him: it was Blackwell who reminded Fleming of the name. Fleming also disliked Goldfinger, who, Fleming thought, destroyed Victorian buildings and replaced them with his own modernist designs, particularly a terrace at Goldfinger's own residence at 2 Willow Road, Hampstead. Blackwell had his name used as the heroin smuggler at the beginning of the book, with a sister who was a heroin addict.

There were some similarities between Ernő and Auric Goldfinger: both were Jewish immigrants who came to Britain from Eastern Europe in the 1930s and both were Marxists. The fictional and real Goldfingers were physically very different. According to the historian Henry Chancellor the likely model for Auric Goldfinger was the American gold tycoon Charles W. Engelhard Jr., whom Fleming had met in 1949. Engelhard had established a business, the Precious Metals Development Company, which circumvented numerous export restrictions, selling gold ingots directly into Hong Kong.

=== Characters ===
The character of Bond was developed more in Goldfinger than in the previous novels; the historian Jeremy Black considers that Bond "was presented as a complex character". The novelist Raymond Benson—who later wrote a series of Bond novels—sees Goldfinger as a transitional novel, making Bond more human than in previous books and more concerned with what Benson calls "the mortal trappings of life". This manifests itself in the opening chapter of the book as Bond sits in Miami airport and thinks through his fight with and killing of a Mexican thug. Benson also finds Bond developing something of a sense of humour in Goldfinger, verbally abusing Oddjob for his own amusement.

The anthropologist Anthony Synnott examined several examples of racism in the Bond novels, and finds in Goldfinger examples of "the most blatant racism" of the series, all of which concern the Koreans; as an example, Synnott highlights the sentence "putting Oddjob and any other Korean firmly in his place, which, in Bond's estimation, was rather lower than apes in the mammalian hierarchy". Benson agrees that Bond is shown as a bigot in the passage quoted, and observes that this is the only point in all the works in which Bond disparages a whole race.

... everything was out of proportion. Goldfinger was short, not more than five feet tall, and on top of the thick body and blunt, peasant legs, was set almost directly into the shoulders, a huge and it seemed almost exactly round head. It was as if Goldfinger had been put together with bits of other people's bodies. Nothing seemed to belong.

— Goldfinger

The writer Anthony Burgess, in his 1984 work Ninety-nine Novels, describes Fleming's malefactors as "impossible villains, enemies of democracy, megalomaniacs"; Burgess goes on to write that Goldfinger "is the most extravagant of these". The character was described by Benson as "Fleming's most successful villain" to that point in the series, and Fleming gives him several character flaws that are brought out across the novel. Black writes that psychologically Goldfinger is warped, possibly because of an inferiority complex brought on by his shortness, in contrast to several of Fleming's other over-sized villains. Physically he is odd, with a lack of proportion to his body. According to the literary analyst LeRoy L. Panek, in his examination of 20th-century British spy novels, in several of Fleming's novels he uses "characters as psychological counters in a game of simplified psychology". Fleming writes that "Bond always mistrusted short men. They grew up from childhood with an inferiority complex. ... Napoleon had been short, and Hitler. It was the short men that caused all the trouble in the world", an opinion Black considers a reflection of the "racialism and crude psychology" of early-twentieth century literature.

Like many other of Fleming's villains, Goldfinger is not of British extraction (although he is a British citizen); other villains have been, for example, Russian, German, Jewish, Chinese-German or Slav. (Note: Those villains are, respectively, Rosa Klebb (From Russia, With Love), Hugo Drax (Moonraker), Le Chiffre (Casino Royale), Dr. No (Dr. No) and Blofeld (Thunderball, On Her Majesty's Secret Service and You Only Live Twice).) Synnott observes that in many of the Bond novels, including Goldfinger, "Ugliness, evil and foreignness go together, complementing and reinforcing each other. Ugliness symbolizes evil and evil is symbolized by ugliness and foreignness."

Fleming employs devices he uses elsewhere in the series to show Goldfinger is corrupt or outside what Fleming considered normal. Goldfinger cheats at cards and golf; Panek considers this is a traditional sign of a gauche individual. Black considers that Goldfinger is portrayed as a killjoy as he does not consume cigarettes or alcohol—unlike many people of the time—but he does pay prostitutes; these aspects of Goldfinger's are condemned by Fleming for being outside normal appetites.

Elisabeth Ladenson, the general editor of Romanic Review, believes the character of Pussy Galore to be "perhaps the most memorable figure in the Bond periphery". Galore was introduced by Fleming for Bond to seduce her, proving Bond's masculinity by his being able to seduce a lesbian. To some extent the situation also reflected Fleming's own opinions, expressed in the novel as part of Bond's thoughts, where "her sexual confusion is attributable to women's suffrage"; in addition, as Fleming himself put it in the book: "Bond felt the sexual challenge all beautiful Lesbians have for men." Ladenson points out that, unlike some Bond girls, Galore's role in the plot is crucial and she is not just there as an accessory: it is her change of heart that allows good to triumph over evil. The cultural historians Janet Woollacott and Tony Bennett consider that many of the female characters in the Bond series depart from Fleming's accepted cultural norms; both Pussy Galore and Tilly Masterton conform to this rule because they are lesbian. For those that Bond sleeps with, there is a back story explaining why they are outside Fleming's norm: in Pussy Galore's case, it is because she was raped by her uncle. According to Stephen Heath, the literature and cultural historian, Galore's lesbianism is explained by being anti-man, following the rape, and she is converted because, as she says in the book, "I never met a man before". Bond's 'conversion' of Galore from lesbian to his bed partner "reflected Fleming's sexual politics". It was, Black sees, a "crude end to the book, a form of happy ending".

== Style ==
The sixth Bond novel, Dr. No began what the media historian James Chapman describes as the move of the Bond books to "fantastic and highly improbable plots"; Chapman considers that Goldfinger maintains that trend. He also finds it "the most implausible of Fleming's plots". Benson states that the plot is impractical and that "sometimes there's no logic in the sequence of events"; the author Kingsley Amis—who also later wrote a Bond novel—says that the novel was "more implausible than most". According to Panek there is an episodic approach in Fleming's works; in Goldfinger this manifests itself in the use of the card game—something also seen in Casino Royale and Moonraker; Benson considers the novel to be more episodic than Fleming's previous books.

Fleming structured the novel in three sections—"Happenstance", "Coincidence" and "Enemy action"—which was how Goldfinger described Bond's three seemingly coincidental meetings with him. Like Dr. No, what seems to be a trivial event—in this case the card game—leads to what Chapman calls "a grandiose criminal conspiracy". The denouement of the novel is described by Black as "hurried and unsatisfactory", and the "one-man heroism" of the work is too stretched across the novel.

Benson, and Fleming's biographer Matthew Parker, consider Goldfinger to be the "densest" of the Bond novels, with a fast pace and high levels of action, in which Bond moves from Miami, via New York to London, then through Kent and northern France to Switzerland, then back to New York, to Kentucky, to New York, Washington, and finally ditching the aeroplane in the North Atlantic.

== Themes ==
As with other Bond novels, such as Casino Royale, gambling is a theme—not only the money staked on the golf match as part of the novel, but opening with the canasta game. Raymond Benson identified times in the novel when Bond's investigation of Goldfinger was a gamble too, and cites Bond tossing a coin to decide on his tactics in relation to his quarry. Once more (as with Live and Let Die and Dr. No) it is Bond the British agent who has to sort out what turns out to be an American problem and this, along with Bond's warning to Goldfinger not to underestimate the English, may be seen as Fleming's reaction to the lack of US support over the Suez Crisis in 1956.

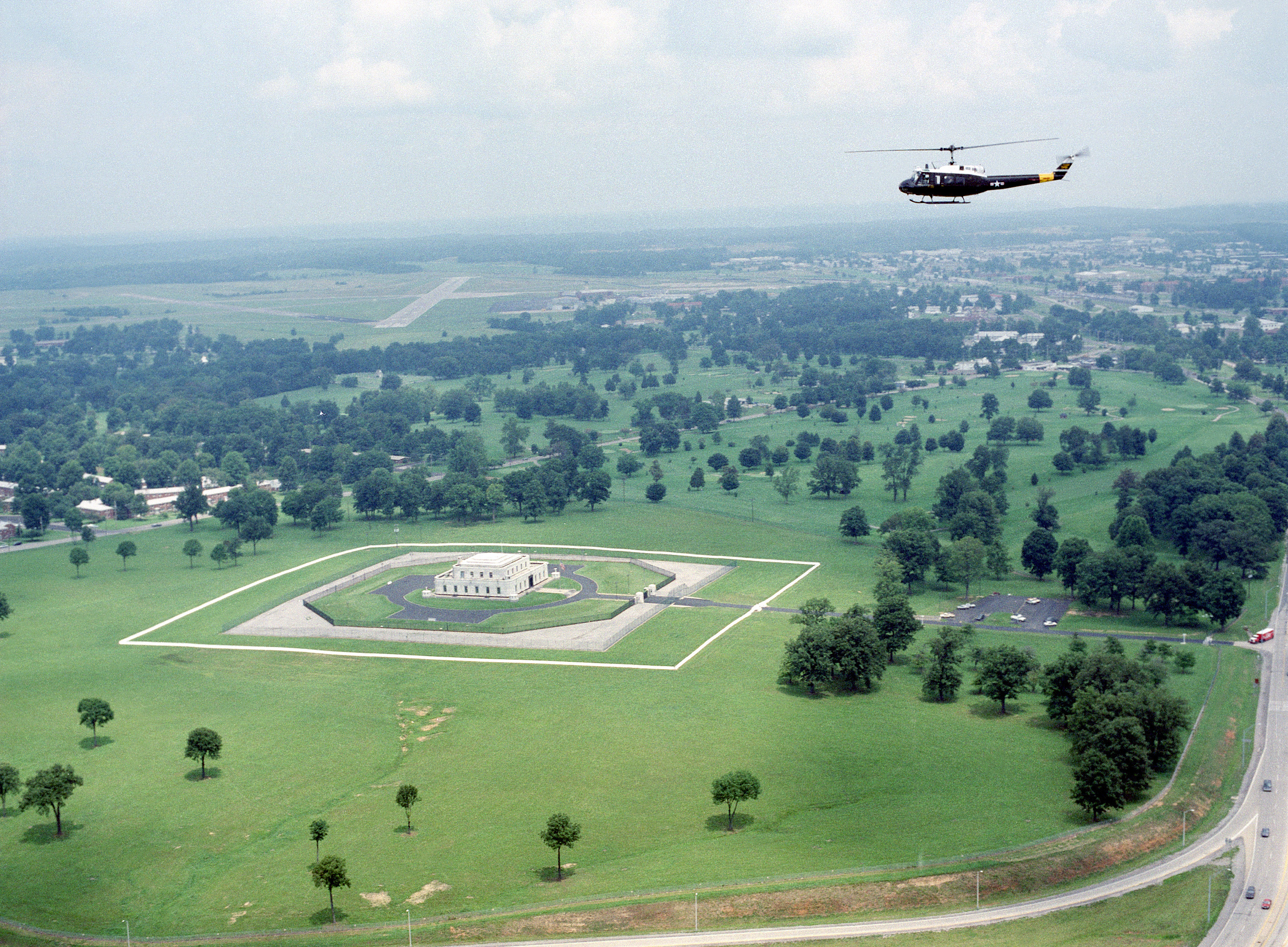
Aerial view of the Gold Bullion Depository at Fort Knox

Benson identifies a theme of Bond acting as St George in Goldfinger which, he says, has run in all the novels, but is finally stated explicitly in the book as part of Bond's thoughts. This is after Goldfinger reveals he will use an atomic device to open the vault: "Bond sighed wearily. Once more into the breach, dear friend! This time it really was St George and the dragon. And St George had better get a move on and do something". Jeremy Black notes that the image of the "latter-day St George [is] again an English, rather than British image". According to Ladenson, by making Bond St George, "Goldfinger himself ... is a mere obstacle, the dragon to be got rid of before the worthy knight can make off with the duly conquered lady".

Goldfinger has an obsession with gold to the extent that Ladenson says that he is "a walking tautology". Ladenson lists both his family name and his first name as being related to gold ("Auric" is an adjective pertaining to gold); his clothes, hair, car and cat are all gold coloured, or a variant thereof; his Korean servants are referred to by Bond as being "yellow", or yellow-faced"; and he paints his women (usually prostitutes) gold before sex.

As with a number of other villains in the Bond novels, there is a reference to the Second World War, to show the post-war readers how evil Bond's villains were. Thus, Goldfinger employs members of the German Luftwaffe, Japanese and Koreans. For Operation Grand Slam, Goldfinger used the poison GB—now known as Sarin—which had been discovered by the Nazis. Pussy Galore's all-woman criminal gang has some members that look "like some young SS guardsman", to underline the connection to evil.

== Publication and reception ==
=== Publication history ===
Goldfinger was published on 23 March 1959 in the UK as a hardcover edition by Jonathan Cape; it was 318 pages long and cost fifteen shillings. As with his previous four novels, Fleming came up with the design of the front cover, which featured a rose between a skull's teeth. He commissioned Richard Chopping to provide the artwork. According to Jonathan Hopson of the Victoria and Albert Museum, the cover's "macabre symbolism memorably expresses the novel's themes of greed, sex and death". The book was dedicated to "gentle reader, William Plomer". The novel went straight to the top of the best-seller lists. Fleming took part in a select number of promotional activities, including appearing on the television programme The Bookman and attending a book signing at Harrods. In May 1961 Pan Books published a paperback version of the novel in the UK, which sold 161,000 copies before the end of the year. Since its initial publication the book has been issued in numerous hardback and paperback editions, translated into several languages and, as at 2025, has never been out of print.

In 2023 Ian Fleming Publications—the company that administers all Fleming's literary works—had the Bond series edited as part of a sensitivity review to remove or reword some racial or ethnic descriptors. The rerelease of the series was for the 70th anniversary of Casino Royale, the first Bond novel.

=== Critical reception ===
Goldfinger received more positive reviews than Fleming's previous novel, Dr. No, which had faced widespread criticism in the British media. Writing in The Observer, Maurice Richardson thought that "Mr. Fleming seems to be leaving realism further and further behind and developing only in the direction of an atomic, sophisticated Sapper". Though Fleming may have left reality behind, Richardson considered that the writer, "even with his forked tongue sticking right through his cheek, ... remains maniacally readable". Richardson said that Goldfinger "is the most preposterous specimen yet displayed in Mr. Fleming's museum of super fiends", and, referring to the novel's central character, observed that "the real trouble with Bond, from a literary point of view, is that he is becoming more and more synthetic and zombie-ish. Perhaps it is just as well." In The Manchester Guardian, Roy Perrott observed that "Goldfinger ... will not let [Bond's] close admirers down". Perrott thought that overall "Fleming is again at his best when most sportingly Buchan-ish as in the motoring pursuit across Europe"; he summarised the book by saying that it was "hard to put down; but some of us wish we had the good taste just to try".

The Times thought that Bond was "backed up by sound writing" by Fleming; the critic thought that although the plot was grandiose "it sounds—and is—fantastic; the skill of Mr. Fleming is to be measured by the fact that it is made not to seem so". For The Times Literary Supplement, Michael Robson considered that "a new Bond has emerged from these pages: an agent more relaxed, less promiscuous, less stagily muscular than of yore". Robson added that "the story, too, is more relaxed". Robson saw this as a positive development, but it did mean that although "there are incidental displays of the virtuosity to which Mr. Fleming has accustomed us, ... the narrative does not slip into top gear until Goldfinger unfolds his plan". The Evening Standard looked at why Bond was a success and listed "the things that make Bond attractive: the sex, the sadism, the vulgarity of money for its own sake, the cult of power, the lack of standards". The Sunday Times called Goldfinger "Guilt-edged Bond"; the critic for The Manchester Evening News thought that "Only Fleming could have got away with it ... outrageously improbable, wickedly funny, wildly exciting".

Even the "avid anti-Bond and an anti-Fleming man", Anthony Boucher, writing for The New York Times appeared to enjoy Goldfinger, saying "the whole preposterous fantasy strikes me as highly entertaining". The critic for The New York Herald Tribune, James Sandoe considered the book to be "a superlative thriller from our foremost literary magician".

Burgess cites Goldfinger as one of the 99 best novels in English since 1939. "Fleming raised the standard of the popular story of espionage through good writing—a heightened journalistic style—and the creation of a government agent—James Bond, 007—who is sufficiently complicated to compel our interest over a whole series of adventures."

== Adaptations ==
Goldfinger was serialised on a daily basis in the Daily Express newspaper from 18 March 1959 onwards. Fleming's original novel was adapted as a daily comic strip which was published in the same paper and syndicated around the world—the first of the novels to be adapted as such. The adaptation ran from 3 October 1960 to 1 April 1961, and Fleming received £1,500 for the British publication and a percentage for syndicated copies. (Note: £1,000 in 1960 equates to approximately £30,000 in 2025, according to calculations based on the Consumer Price Index measure of inflation.) The adaptation was written by Henry Gammidge and illustrated by John McLusky. Goldfinger was reprinted in 2005 by Titan Books as part of the Dr. No anthology, which in addition to Dr. No, also included Diamonds Are Forever and From Russia, with Love.

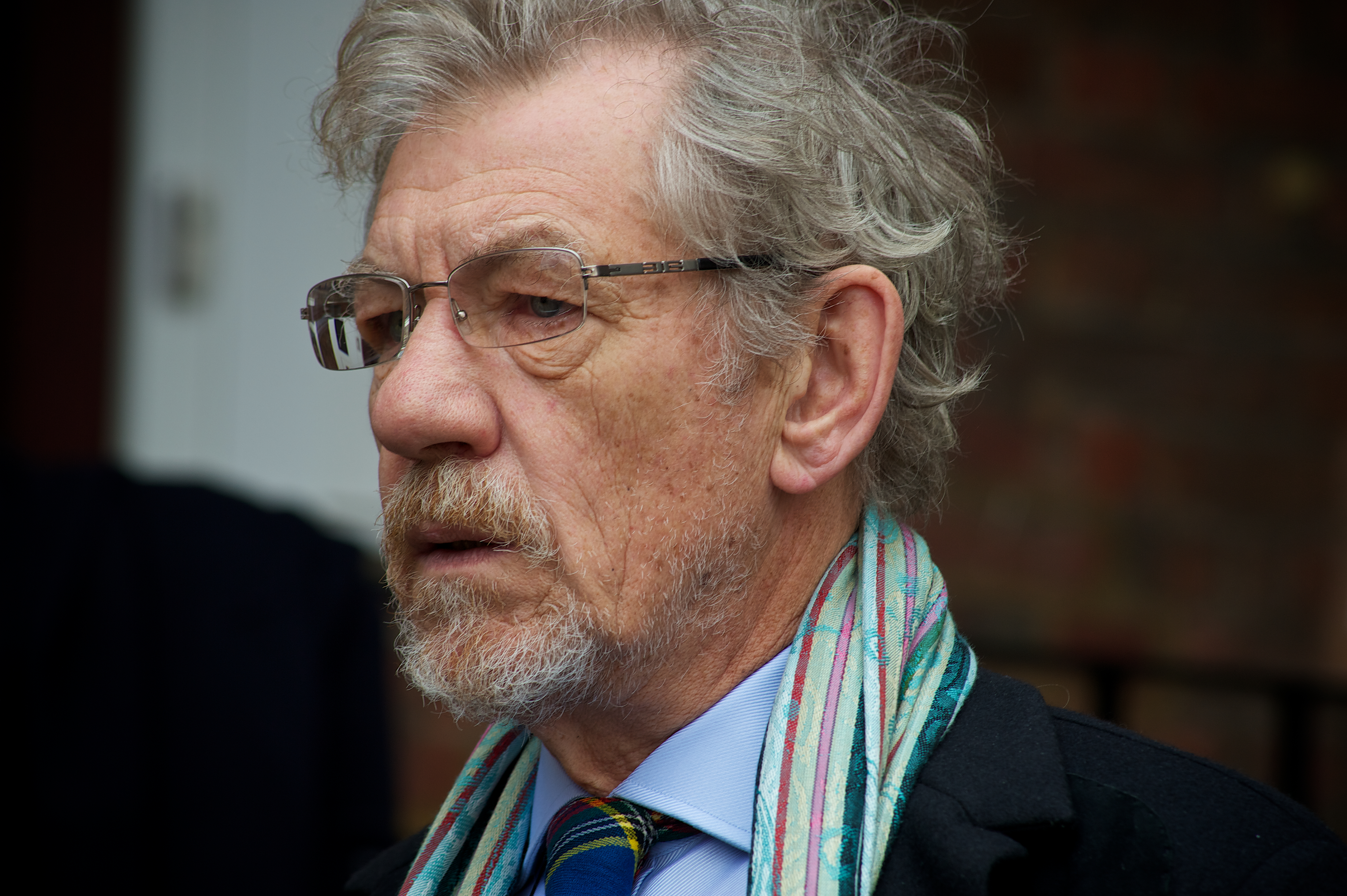
Sir Ian McKellen: Goldfinger on BBC Radio 4

In 1964 Goldfinger became the third entry in the James Bond film series. Sean Connery returned as Bond, and the German actor Gert Fröbe played Auric Goldfinger. The film was mostly similar to the novel, but Jill and Tilly Masterton (renamed Masterson for the film) have shortened roles and earlier deaths in the story. The plot of the film was also changed from stealing the gold at Fort Knox to irradiating the gold vault with a dirty bomb. Alan Barnes and Marcus Hearn, in their examination of the Bond films, consider that the film improves on what they see as some of Fleming's "ludicrous notions". The pair highlight the irradiation of the gold in Fort Knox, and the change of Pussy Galore's organisation to stunt pilots, rather than masquerading as nurses, as examples of improvements.

The 1973 BBC documentary Omnibus: The British Hero featured Christopher Cazenove playing a number of such title characters (e.g. Richard Hannay and Bulldog Drummond), including James Bond in dramatised scenes from Goldfinger—notably featuring the hero being threatened with the novel's circular saw, rather than the film's laser beam—and Diamonds Are Forever.

Following its radio version of Dr. No, produced in 2008 as a special one-off to mark the centenary of Ian Fleming's birth, Eon Productions allowed a second Bond story to be adapted. On 3 April 2010 BBC Radio 4 broadcast a radio adaptation of Goldfinger with Toby Stephens (who played the villain Gustav Graves in Die Another Day) as Bond, Sir Ian McKellen as Goldfinger and Stephens's Die Another Day co-star Rosamund Pike as Pussy Galore. The play was adapted from Fleming's novel by Archie Scottney and was directed by Martin Jarvis.

== See also ==
Quotations related to Goldfinger at Wikiquote

- List of James Bond novels and short stories
- Outline of James Bond

== Notes and references ==
=== Sources ===
==== Books ====
- Amis, Kingsley (1966). The James Bond Dossier. London: Pan Books. OCLC 154139618.
- Barnes, Alan; Hearn, Marcus (2001). Kiss Kiss Bang! Bang!: the Unofficial James Bond Film Companion. London: Batsford Books. ISBN 978-0-7134-8645-2.
- Bennett, Tony; Woollacott, Janet (1987). Bond and Beyond: The Political Career of a Popular Hero. London: Routledge. ISBN 978-0-4160-1361-0.
- Bennett, Tony; Woollacott, Janet (2009). "The Moments of Bond". In Lindner, Christoph (ed.). The James Bond Phenomenon: a Critical Reader. Manchester: Manchester University Press. ISBN 978-0-7190-6541-5.
- Benson, Raymond (1988). The James Bond Bedside Companion. London: Boxtree Ltd. ISBN 978-1-85283-233-9.
- Black, Jeremy (2005). The Politics of James Bond: from Fleming's Novel to the Big Screen. Lincoln, NE: University of Nebraska Press. ISBN 978-0-8032-6240-9.
- Burgess, Anthony (1984). Ninety-nine Novels. New York: Summit Books. ISBN 978-0-6715-2407-4.
- Chancellor, Henry (2005). James Bond: The Man and His World. London: John Murray. ISBN 978-0-7195-6815-2.
- Chapman, James (2009). Licence to Thrill: A Cultural History of the James Bond Films. New York: I.B. Tauris. ISBN 978-1-84511-515-9.
- Eco, Umberto (2009). "The Narrative Structure of Ian Fleming". In Lindner, Christoph (ed.). The James Bond Phenomenon: a Critical Reader. Manchester: Manchester University Press. ISBN 978-0-7190-6541-5.
- Faulks, Sebastian; Fleming, Ian (2009). Devil May Care. London: Penguin Books. ISBN 978-0-14-103545-1.
- Fleming, Ian; Gammidge, Henry; McLusky, John (1988). Octopussy. London: Titan Books. ISBN 1-85286-040-5.
- Fleming, Ian (2006a). Goldfinger. London: Penguin Books. ISBN 978-0-14-102831-6.
- Fleming, Ian (2006b). The Man with the Golden Gun. London: Penguin Books. ISBN 978-0-14-102823-1.
- Gant, Richard (1966). Ian Fleming: Man with the Golden Pen. London: Mayflower-Dell. OCLC 487676374.
- Griswold, John (2006). Ian Fleming's James Bond: Annotations and Chronologies for Ian Fleming's Bond Stories. Bloomington, IN: AuthorHouse. ISBN 978-1-4259-3100-1.
- Heath, Stephen (1982). The Sexual Fix. London: Macmillan. ISBN 978-1-349-16767-8.
- Ladenson, Elisabeth (2003). "Pussy Galore". In Lindner, Christoph (ed.). The James Bond Phenomenon: a Critical Reader. Manchester: Manchester University Press. ISBN 978-0-7190-6541-5.
- Lycett, Andrew (1996). Ian Fleming. London: Phoenix. ISBN 978-1-85799-783-5.
- Macintyre, Ben (2008). For Your Eyes Only. London: Bloomsbury Publishing. ISBN 978-0-7475-9527-4.
- McLusky, John; Gammidge, Henry; Hern, Anthony; Fleming, Ian (2009). The James Bond Omnibus Vol.1. London: Titan Books. ISBN 978-1-84856-364-3.
- Panek, LeRoy (1981). The Special Branch: The British Spy Novel, 1890–1980. Bowling Green, OH: Bowling Green University Popular Press. ISBN 978-0-87972-178-7.
- Parker, Matthew (2014). Goldeneye. London: Hutchinson. ISBN 978-0-09-195410-9.
- Pearson, John (1967). The Life of Ian Fleming: Creator of James Bond. London: Jonathan Cape. OCLC 923185831.
- Warburton, Nigel (2005). Ernö Goldfinger: the Life of an Architect. London: Routledge. ISBN 978-0-4153-7945-8.

==== Journals and magazines ====
- "The British Hero". Radio Times. 4 October 1973. pp. 74–79.
- Hemley, Matthew (13 October 2009). "James Bond to return to radio as Goldfinger is adapted for BBC". The Stage.
- Synnott, Anthony (Spring 1990). "The Beauty Mystique: Ethics and Aesthetics in the Bond Genre". International Journal of Politics, Culture, and Society. 3 (3): 407–426. doi:10.1007/BF01384969. JSTOR 20006960. S2CID 143938867.

==== Newspapers ====
- Ezard, John (3 June 2005). "How Goldfinger nearly became Goldprick". The Guardian.
- "Irish buyer for Bond typewriter". The Irish Times. 6 May 1995. p. 10.
- "James Bond meets Auric Goldfinger". Daily Express. 17 March 1959. p. 1.
- "New Fiction". The Times. 26 March 1959. p. 15.
- Perrott, Roy (26 March 1959). "Seven days to Armageddon". The Manchester Guardian. p. 8.
- Richardson, Maurice (22 March 1959). "Sophisticated Sapper". The Observer. p. 25.
- Robson, Michael (3 April 1959). "On the Seamy Side". The Times Literary Supplement. p. 198.
- Simpson, Craig (25 February 2023). "James Bond books edited to remove racist references". The Sunday Telegraph.
- "Tea with an Author". The Observer. 5 April 1959. p. 20.
- Thomson, Ian (6 June 2008). "Devil May Care, by Sebastian Faulks, writing as Ian Fleming". The Independent.

==== Websites ====
- Clark, Gregory (2018). "The Annual RPI and Average Earnings for Britain, 1209 to Present (New Series)". MeasuringWorth.
- "Goldfinger". BBC.
- "Goldfinger". WorldCat.
- "Goldfinger (1964)". Screenonline. British Film Institute. Archived from the original on 4 August 2011.
- Hopson, Jonathan (22 March 2019). "The Midas Touch: 60 Years of Goldfinger". Victoria and Albert Museum.
- "Ian Fleming's James Bond Titles". Ian Fleming Publications. Archived from the original on 10 August 2015.
