= 45–46 Albemarle Street =

Office building in London, England

General information
- Type: Office
- Location: London, England
- Coordinates: 51°30′30″N 0°08′29″W
- Completed: 1957

Design and construction
- Architect: Ernő Goldfinger

Listed Building – Grade II
- Official name: 45-46, ALBEMARLE STREET
- Designated: 23 April 1993
- Reference no.: 1248510

45–46 Albemarle Street is a Grade II listed office building on Albemarle Street in the Mayfair area of London.

== History and description ==
The building was a speculative office development on an infill site. Built between 1955 and 1957, it was designed by Ernő Goldfinger with John Duncan as correspondent architect. Its design is thoroughly modernist with steel frames and concrete. The cantilevered windows are a notable feature of the scheme. Despite this, it has been praised for its sensitivity to the scale and style of surrounding streets, its facade following the classical proportions of the "Golden Section". The building was planned as a single cohesive design despite being split in two separate sections for two different clients, although the floors could be connected laterally. Goldfinger modelled his later design for Alexander Fleming House on the office.

== See also ==
- 41 Albemarle Street
