= Gordon Cullen =

British architect and urban designer

Thomas Gordon Cullen (9 August 1914 – 11 August 1994) was an influential British architect and urban designer who was a key motivator in the Townscape movement. Cullen presented a new theory and methodology for urban visual analysis and design based on the psychology of perception, such as the human need for visual stimulation and the notions of time and space. He is best known for the book Townscape, first published in 1961. Later editions of Townscape were published under the title The Concise Townscape.

== Life ==
=== Early life and education ===
Cullen was born in Calverley, Pudsey, near Leeds, Yorkshire, England. He studied architecture at the Royal Polytechnic Institution, the present day University of Westminster, and subsequently worked as a draughtsman in various architects' offices including that of Berthold Lubetkin and Tecton, but he never qualified or practised as an architect.

=== Career ===
A drawing of Cullen's showing use of perspective.

Between 1944 and 1946 he worked in the planning office of the Development and Welfare Department in Barbados, as his poor eyesight meant that he was unfit to serve in the British armed forces. He later returned to London and joined the Architectural Review journal, first as a draughtsman and then as a writer on planning policies. There, he produced many influential editorials and case studies on the theory of planning and the design of towns. Many improvements in Britain's urban and rural environment during the 1950s and 1960s. He was also involved in the Festival of Britain in 1951. One of the few large scale Cullen works on public display is the mural in the foyer of the Erno Goldfinger designed Greenside Primary School in west London, completed in 1953. His 1958 ceramic mural in Coventry, depicting the city's history and its post-war regeneration, is on a much grander scale though now relocated away from its original central location.

=== Illustrations ===
His techniques consisted largely of sketchy drawings that conveyed a particularly clear understanding of his ideas, and these had a considerable influence on subsequent architectural illustration styles. He also illustrated several books by other various authors, before writing his own book - based on the idea of Townscape - in 1961. The Concise Townscape has been republished around 15 times, proving to be one of the most popular books on Urban Design in the 20th Century.

=== Consultancy work ===
In 1956, Cullen became a freelance writer and consultant and, in the years immediately following he advised the cities of Liverpool and Peterborough on their reconstruction and redevelopment plans. In 1960 he was invited to India to advise on the planning aspects of the Ford Foundation's work in New Delhi and Calcutta and so in 1962 he and his family lived in India for 6 months while he worked on the projects. Later, his work included planning advice to the city of Glasgow and during the 1980s the London Docklands Development Corporation.

=== Price & Cullen ===
For a while Cullen teamed up with a student, David Price, and they formed an architectural firm together - Price & Cullen. They won a competition in London in the 1980s and together designed and oversaw the building of the Swedish Quays housing development in Docklands. They worked together until 1990 as Price's first child was born and because Cullen's health was deteriorating. Price died in 2009 at the age of 53.

=== Death and legacy ===
Cullen lived in the small village of Wraysbury (Berkshire) from 1958 until his death, aged 80, on 11 August 1994, following a serious stroke. After his passing, David Gosling and Norman Foster collected various examples of his work and put them together in the book "Visions of Urban Design".

== Awards ==
In 1972 he was elected Honorary Fellow of the RIBA. In 1975 he was awarded with an RDI for illustration and Townscape. The following year he was awarded a medal from The American Institute of Architects. In 1978 he was appointed a CBE for his contribution to architecture from Elizabeth II of the United Kingdom.

== See also ==
- Townscape
- LDDC
- Reg Ward
- Modern Architecture

== Gallery ==
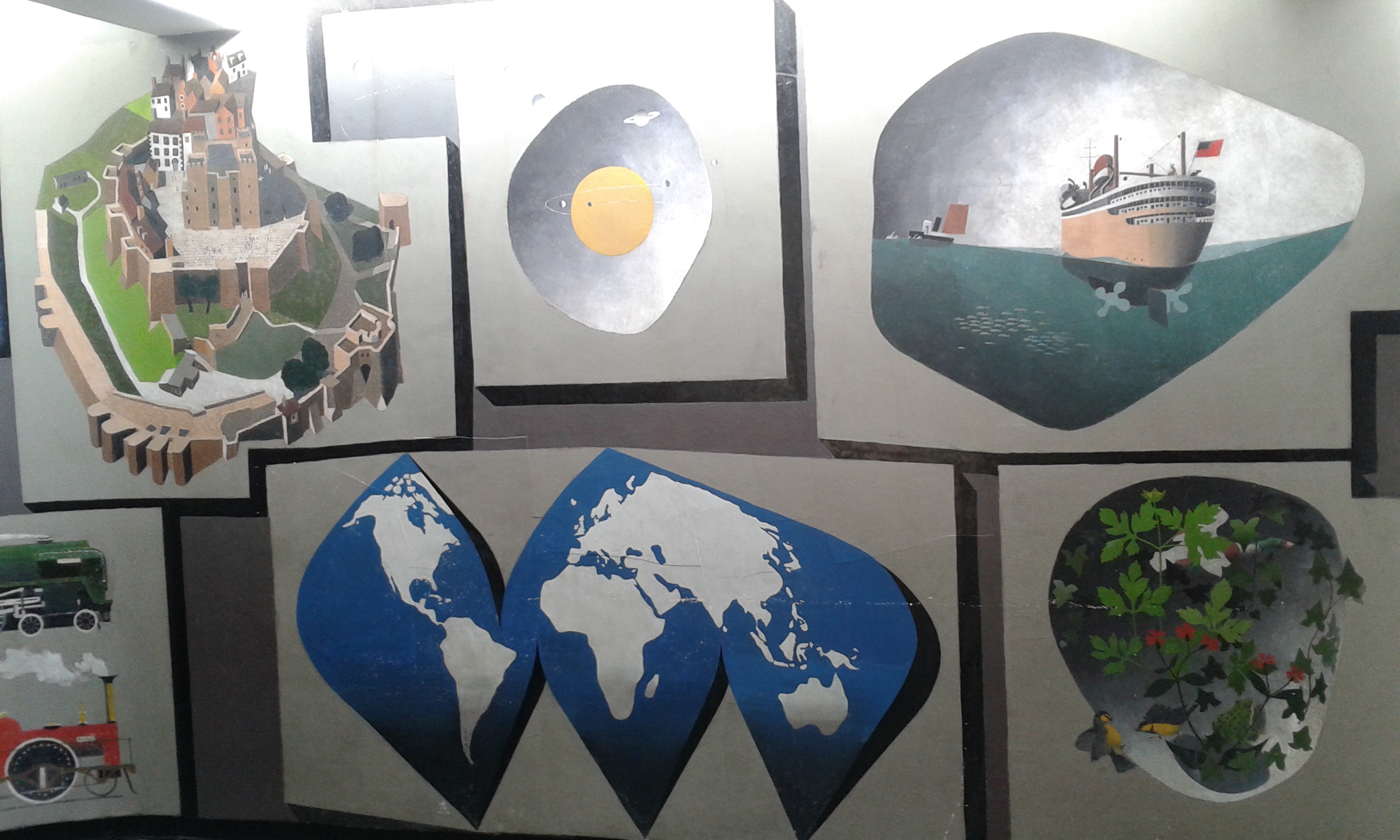
Partial view of the mural at Greenside School
