= Haggerston School =

Location
- Weymouth Terrace; Haggerston; London, E2 8LS; England; 51.53245°N 0.07195°W

Information
- Type: Academy
- Local authority: Hackney
- Trust: Community Schools Trust
- Department for Education URN: 149901 Tables
- Ofsted: Reports
- Headteacher: Ciara Emmerson
- Gender: Coeducational
- Age: 11 to 18
- Enrolment: 1,023 as of August 2023
- Colour: Green 🟩
- Website: http://www.haggerston.hackney.sch.uk/

Haggerston School (previously Haggerston Girls' School) is a secondary school and sixth form located in Weymouth Terrace in Haggerston, London Borough of Hackney, England. The school is noteworthy and of historic importance as a Grade II listed building, being built in 1964–65 by Ernő Goldfinger, the celebrated modernist architect.

Initially only for girls, in September 2010 Haggerston became a coeducational school with its own sixth form.

Previously a community School administered by Hackney London Borough Council, in September 2023 Haggerston School converted to academy status. The school is now sponsored by the Community Schools Trust.

== History ==
In 2006, pupils, parents and teachers protested outside the gates against the Hackney Schools Organising Committee (SOC) plans to make the school a mixed-sex school.

A major refurbishment of the school buildings was completed in 2012.

== Architecture ==
Haggerston School is the only secondary school in the United Kingdom to be designed by internationally regarded architect, Ernő Goldfinger, who studied under Auguste Perret in Paris. Goldfinger's work is unique in Britain in that it combines the influences of Perret, one of the first architects to develop the use of concrete aesthetically, with detailing and forms derived from Le Corbusier. Goldfinger knew both architects personally. The elevations of the school follow the mathematical proportions of the Golden Section and it includes a double-height circulation spine with balcony. The school is distinctive stand out in the East End of London for the large amount of timber used in the construction and contains some of Goldfinger's boldest and most handsome public interiors including bush hammered concrete and coffered ceilings in the entrance and hall block.

On the same site is the School House (1964–65), and it shares a Grade II listing. The School House was designed by Ernő Goldfinger as an integral part of the school itself. The House illustrates Goldfinger's skill for adapting his interest in the use of tough materials, like dark brick and concrete, and refining them for use on a domestic scale with skilful use of proportions.

== Notable alumni ==
- Ivorian Doll, rapper and internet personality
- Patsy Palmer, actress and DJ
