= Albemarle Club =

Former private members' club in London

Coordinates: 51°30′32.8″N 0°8′30.9″W

The Albemarle Club was a private members' club at 13 Albemarle Street, London, founded in 1874 and open to both men and women. It closed in 1941.

== History ==
The club opened on 29 May 1874 with the aim to be available to both men and women. It formed under a committee formed of both sexes, under the presidency of James Stansfeld, Member of Parliament for Halifax. It had initially set the limit for members at 600, with some 350 elected two weeks prior to opening. The club came in for criticism because of its progressive view of women's rights, but also saw supporters join its ranks such as Edward Cortenay MP. However, it was not immediately popular and by January 1879, it had to raise the subscription fees in order to make up the shortfall due to the lack of numbers. A year later, it was said to have suffered from more withdrawals than new admissions and this was blamed on the poor quality of the food being served there. However, by the end of the decade, memberships had reached 600 and the club was considering moving to larger premises.

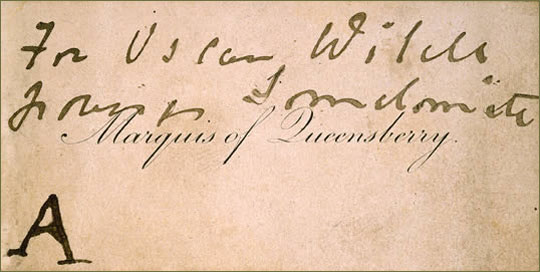
The Marquess of Queensberry's calling card with the handwritten offending inscription "For Oscar Wilde posing Somdomite [sic]". The card was marked as exhibit 'A' in Wilde's libel action.

On 28 February 1895, the club became notorious for being the location of the incident that began the first trial of Oscar Wilde, who was a member of the Albemarle. The Marquess of Queensberry burst into the club, demanding to see Wilde. His entry was blocked by the porter, so instead Queensberry left a calling card with the note "For Oscar Wilde, posing somdomite [sic]". This resulted in Wilde's failed libel action (Wilde v. Queensberry) and subsequent criminal prosecution (Regina v. Wilde).

At the turn of the 20th century, the club remained successful with vacancies only usually arising through the deaths of current members.

Because of the club's prominent place in the proceedings, and its being named at the trial, it fell into disrepute. Seeking to distance itself, it moved into Ely House at 37 Dover Street in 1909. The site underwent a refit in 1910 to make the premises better suited to the club; it had previously been used as a residence for the Bishop of Ely. The club closed in 1941.

== See also ==
- List of London's gentlemen's clubs
