= Greenside Primary School =

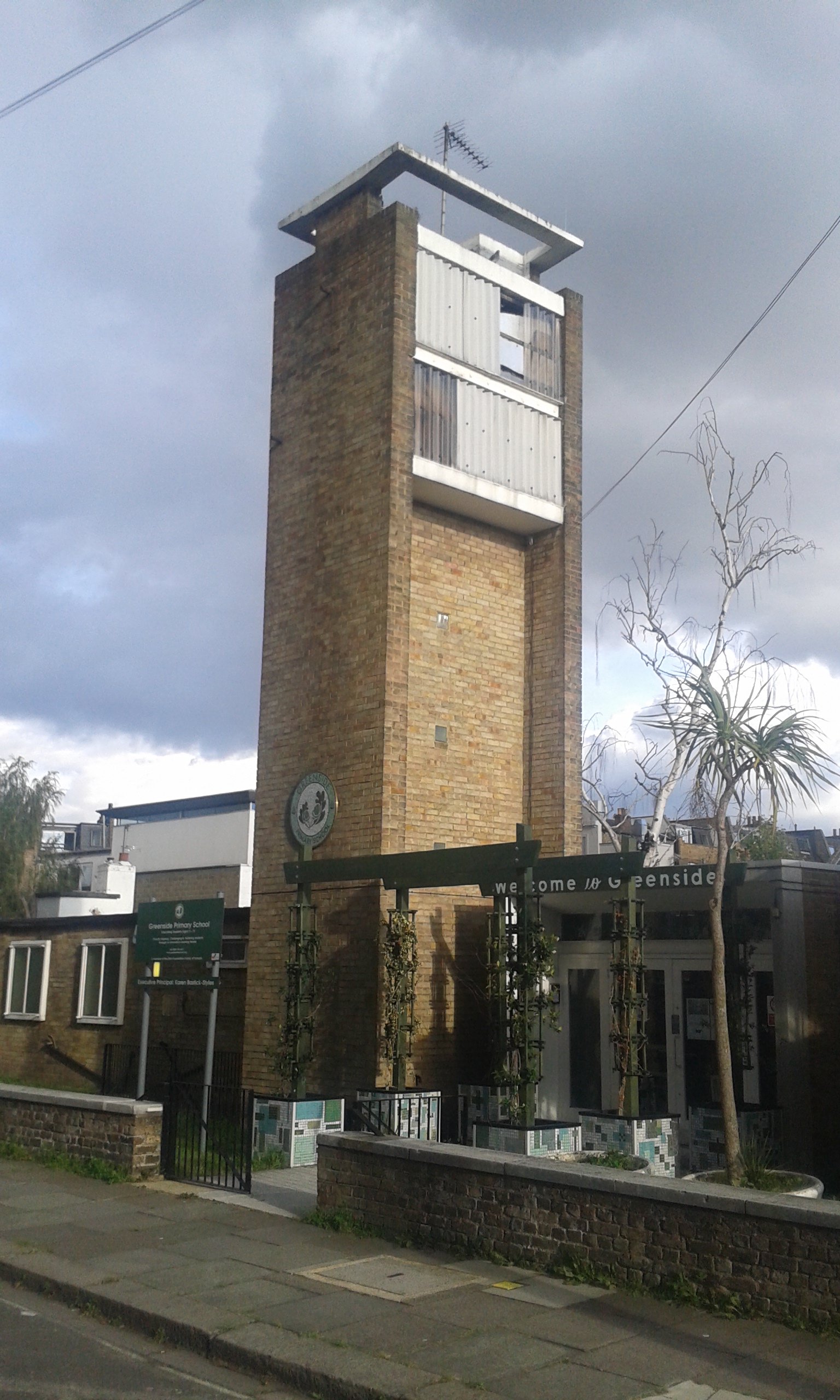

Location
- Westville Road; Hammersmith; London, W12 9PT; England
- Coordinates: 51.503475°N 0.237391°W

Information
- Type: Academy
- Local authority: Hammersmith and Fulham
- Trust: The Elliot Foundation Academies Trust
- Department for Education URN: 141902 Tables
- Ofsted: Reports
- Gender: Coeducational
- Website: https://www.greensideschool.org/

Greenside Primary School is a coeducational primary school in Westville Road in Hammersmith, London, England.

== Architecture ==
Greenside Primary School is a Grade II* listed building built in 1952 and designed by the internationally renowned architect Ernő Goldfinger.

Greenside Primary School (along with Brandlehow School) is one of the two only examples of pre-cast reinforced concrete frame with brick infill designed by Goldfinger after the Second World War with the objective of re-built schools in a functional, fast and economical manner.

The building has a fine top lit mural by artist Gordon Cullen that was restored in 2014.

== History ==
The school is on the site of a Victorian Board School, built in 1886 to accommodate 1,200 children and offer a ‘serviceable education at very low fees.’ The old school was bombed in 1944, but the children had already been evacuated.

The current building was opened in 1952, originally named Westville Road School. In 1987 it was renamed Greenside School.

== Bibliography ==
- Warburton, Nigel. Ernő Goldfinger: The Life of an Architect (Routledge, 2004) ISBN 0-415-25853-7.

== Gallery ==
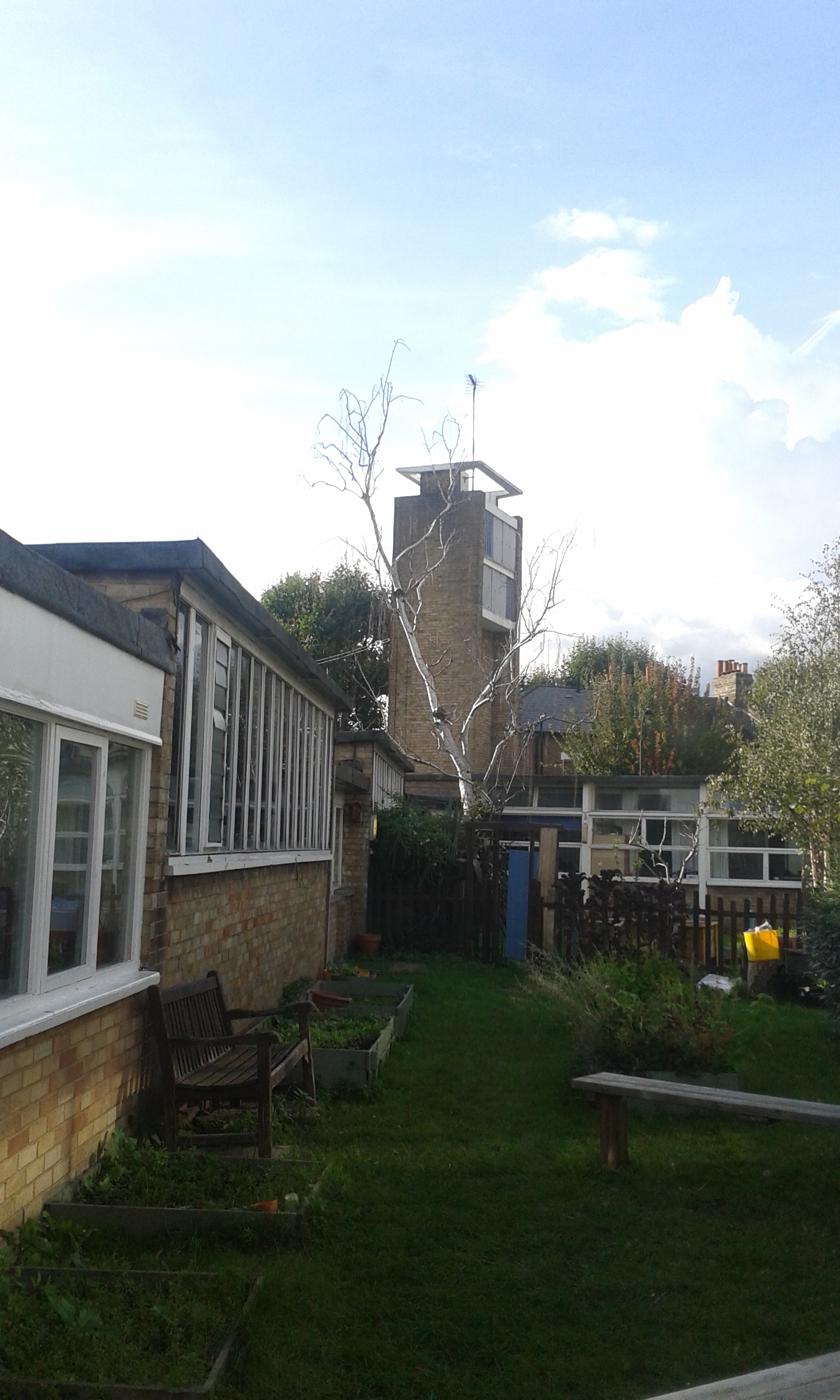
View of the school

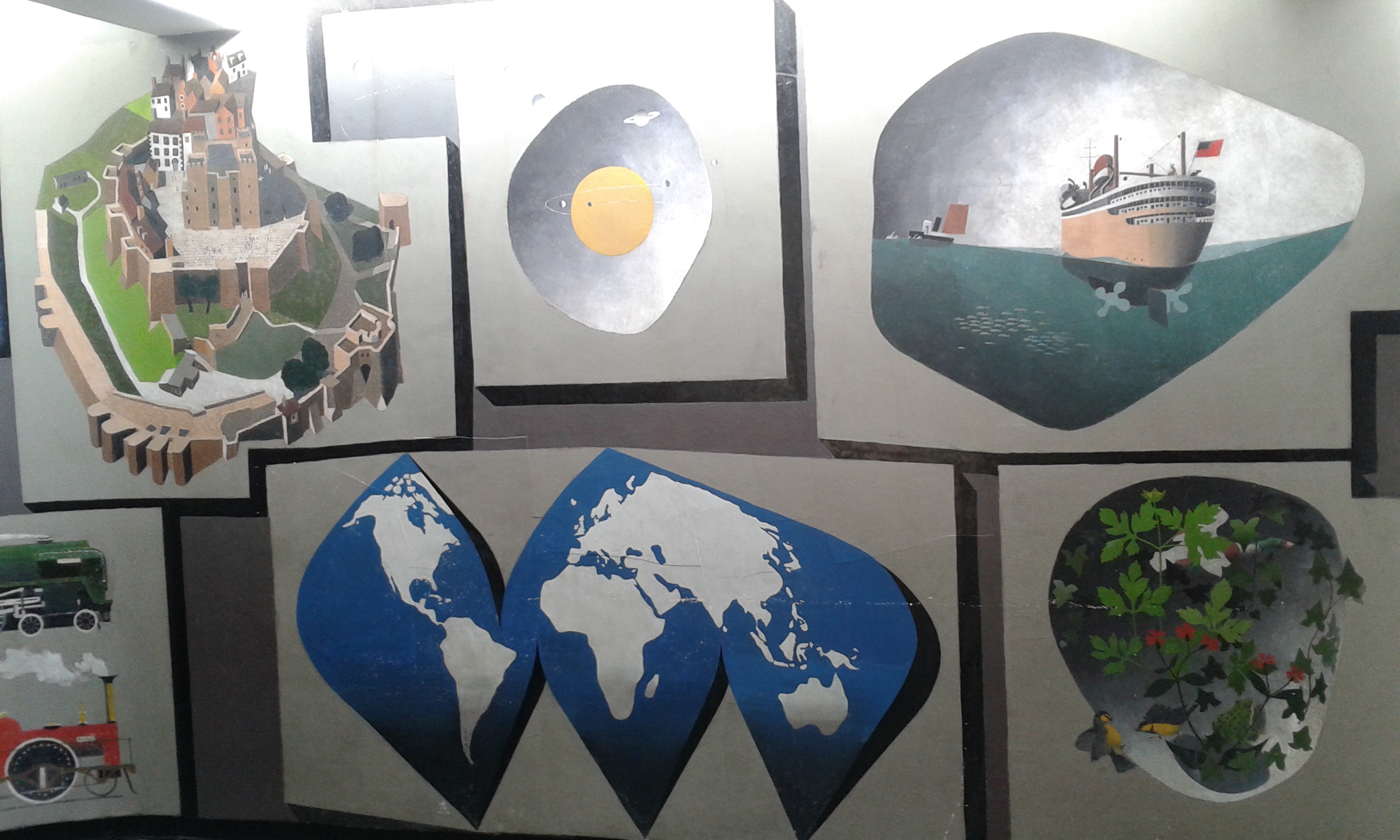
Partial view of the mural by Gordon Cullen

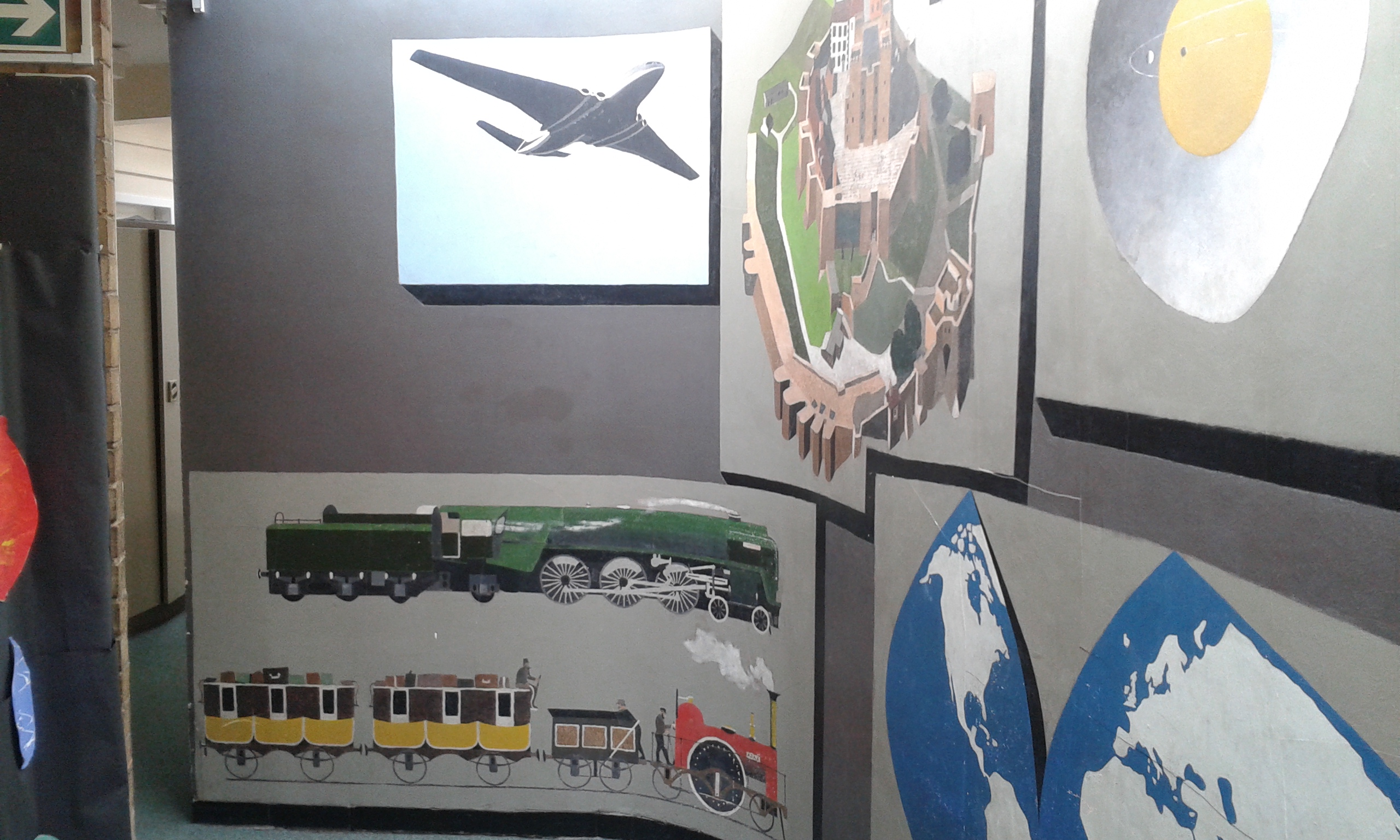
Partial view of the mural by Gordon Cullen

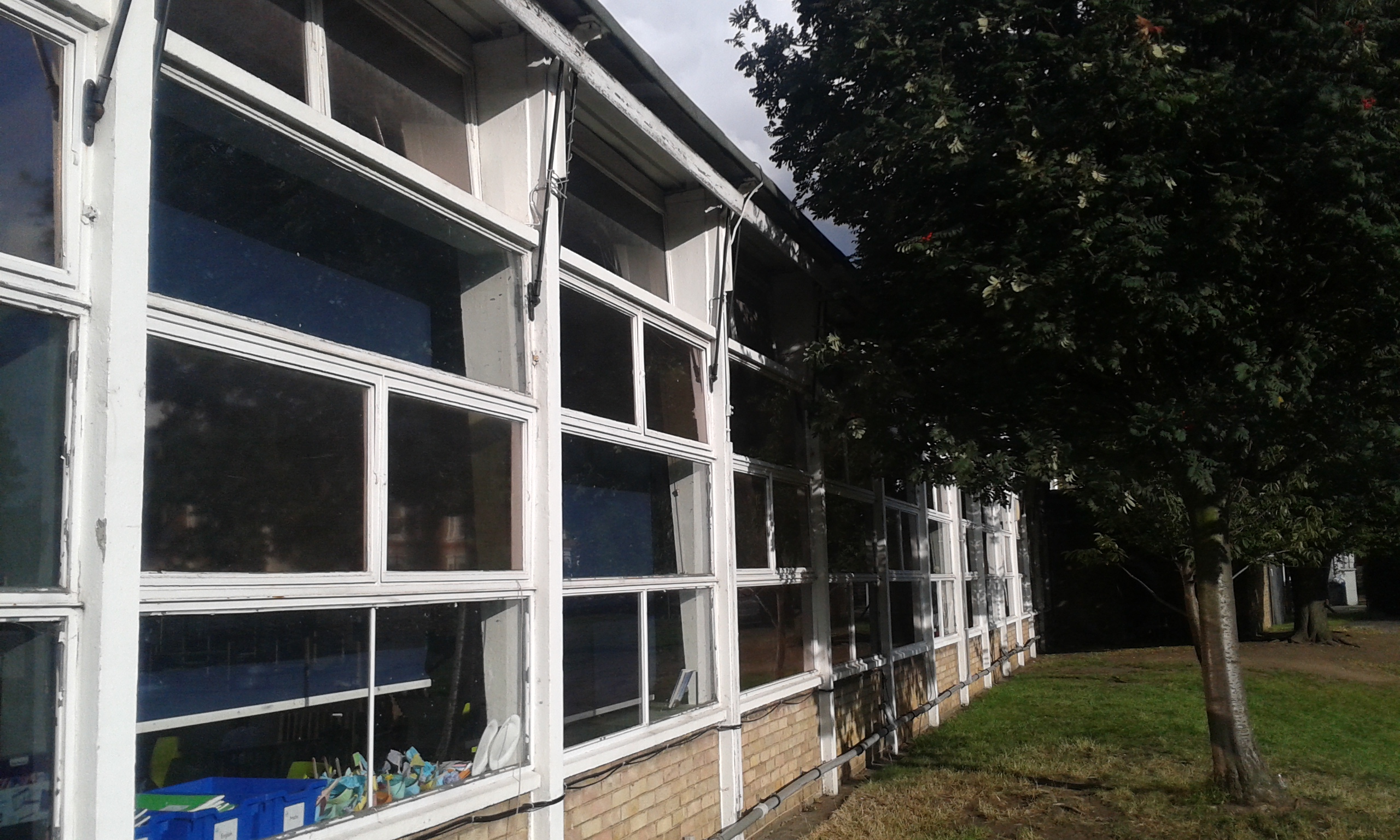
View of one of the facades of the school

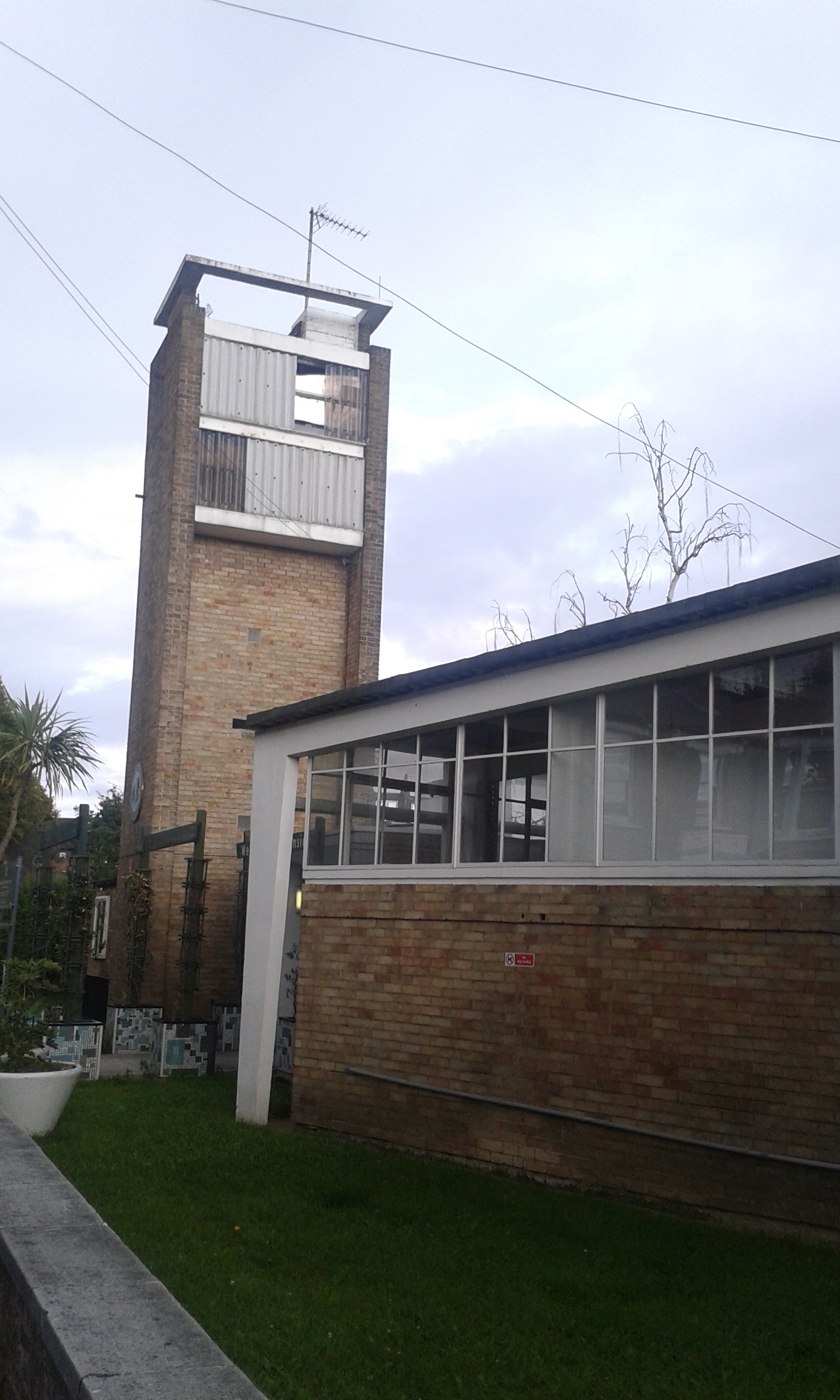
View of the school

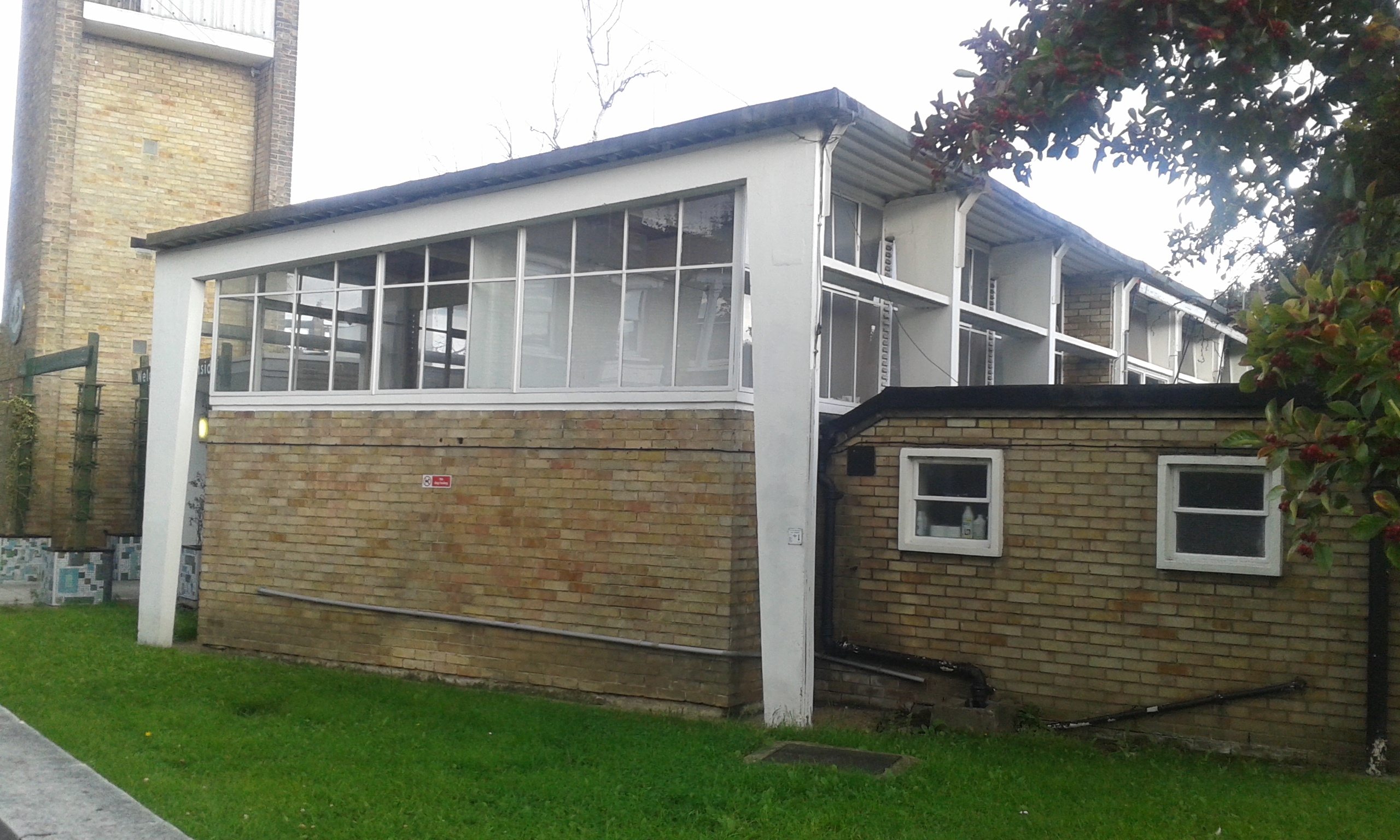
View of the school
