= Brandlehow School =

Brandlehow Primary School
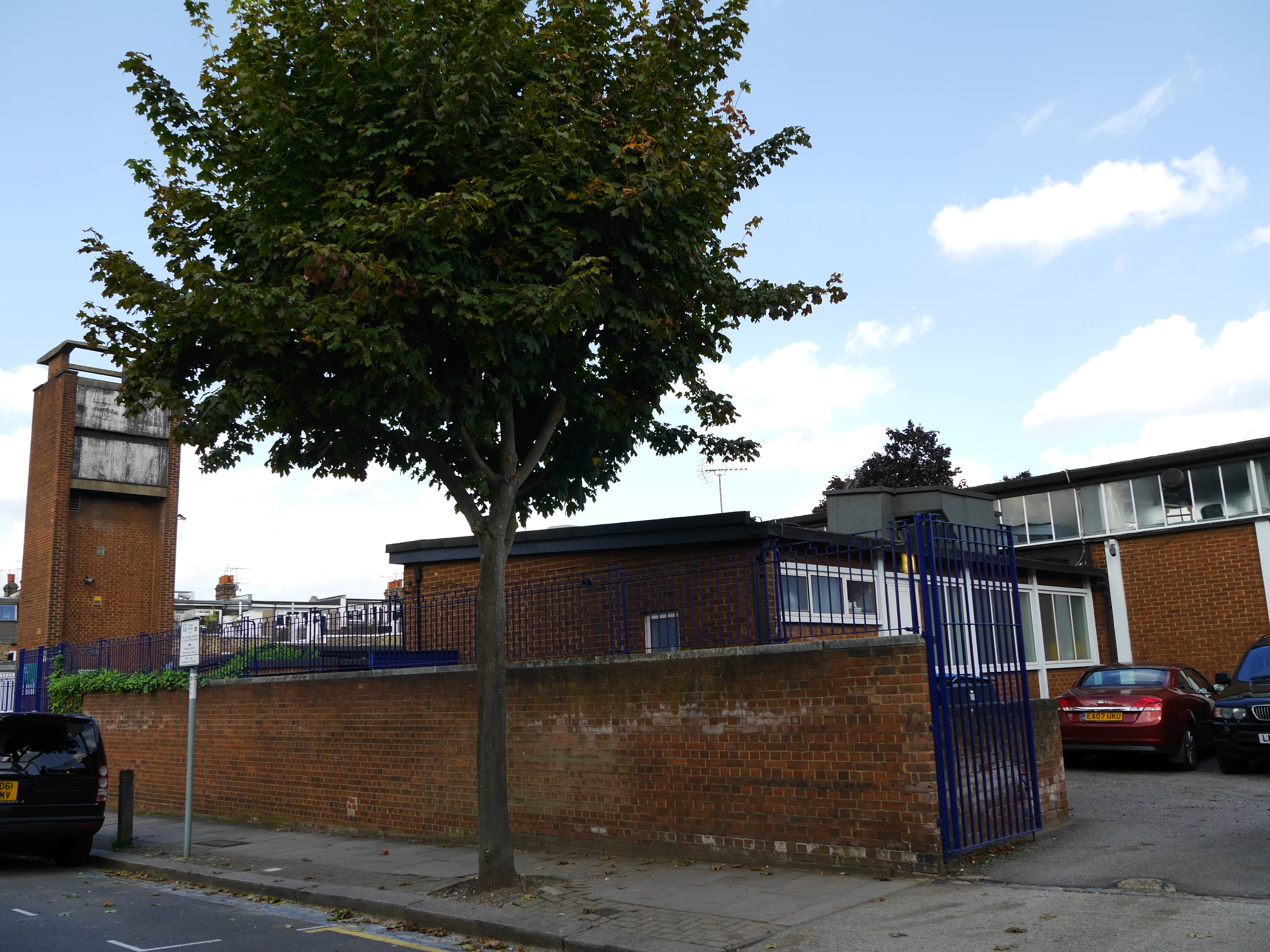

Location
- Brandlehow Road; Putney; London, SW15 2ED; England; 51.461370°N 0.206841°W

Information
- Type: Community school
- Established: 1950
- Local authority: Wandsworth
- Department for Education URN: 101001 Tables
- Ofsted: Reports
- Headteacher: James Lacey
- Gender: Co-educational
- Age: 3 to 11
- Enrollment: 305
- Capacity: 350
- Website: www.brandlehowschool.org.uk

Brandlehow Primary School is in Putney in the London Borough of Wandsworth, the building was designed by Ernő Goldfinger and is Grade II listed.

== Location ==
The school is in Putney SW15 on the east side of Brandlehow Road, south of Wandsworth Park and north of the railway line between Putney station and Wandsworth town station.

== Site history ==
The original 'Brandlehow Road School' was a three storey building and opened on the site in February 1902, the site was hit during bombing in World War Two, the London County Council Bomb Damage Map (1945) shows many buildings were damaged beyond repair.

== Building ==
The existing building was designed by Ernő Goldfinger, it was built in 1950 and then opened by broadcaster Wilfred Pickles in June 1952.

Goldfinger's design used his own innovative prefabricated reinforced concrete-frame system, also used at Greenside Primary School in Hammersmith and which used half the steel of standard steel-framed buildings at the time. The building frame was infilled with red bricks in an L-shaped layout around the playground, with a single storey, including a taller assembly hall with full-height windows looking into the playground on the west side, with classrooms on the north side, and a brick tower at the site entrance.

An extension was designed by Goldfinger in the 1960s, this was not prefabricated and had less glazing.

The building was listed as Grade II on 30 March 1993.

== Recent additions ==
In 2005 an extension by team 51.5° architects was added also using prefabricated techniques, the new building opened in 2006 and included a new wooden playground.

The original Goldfinger designed school keeper's cottage was illegally demolished in 2007 by developer Rajiv Laxman, Director of Abrus Ltd. Laxman was fined £37,000 plus costs of £3,000 under the Planning (Listed Building and Conservation Areas) Act 1990 and the cottage was subsequently restored in 2013 as part of a residential project.

Further plans for building on the school were proposed in 2019.
