= Albemarle Street =

Street in Mayfair, London, England

Coordinates: 51.5091°N 0.1421°W

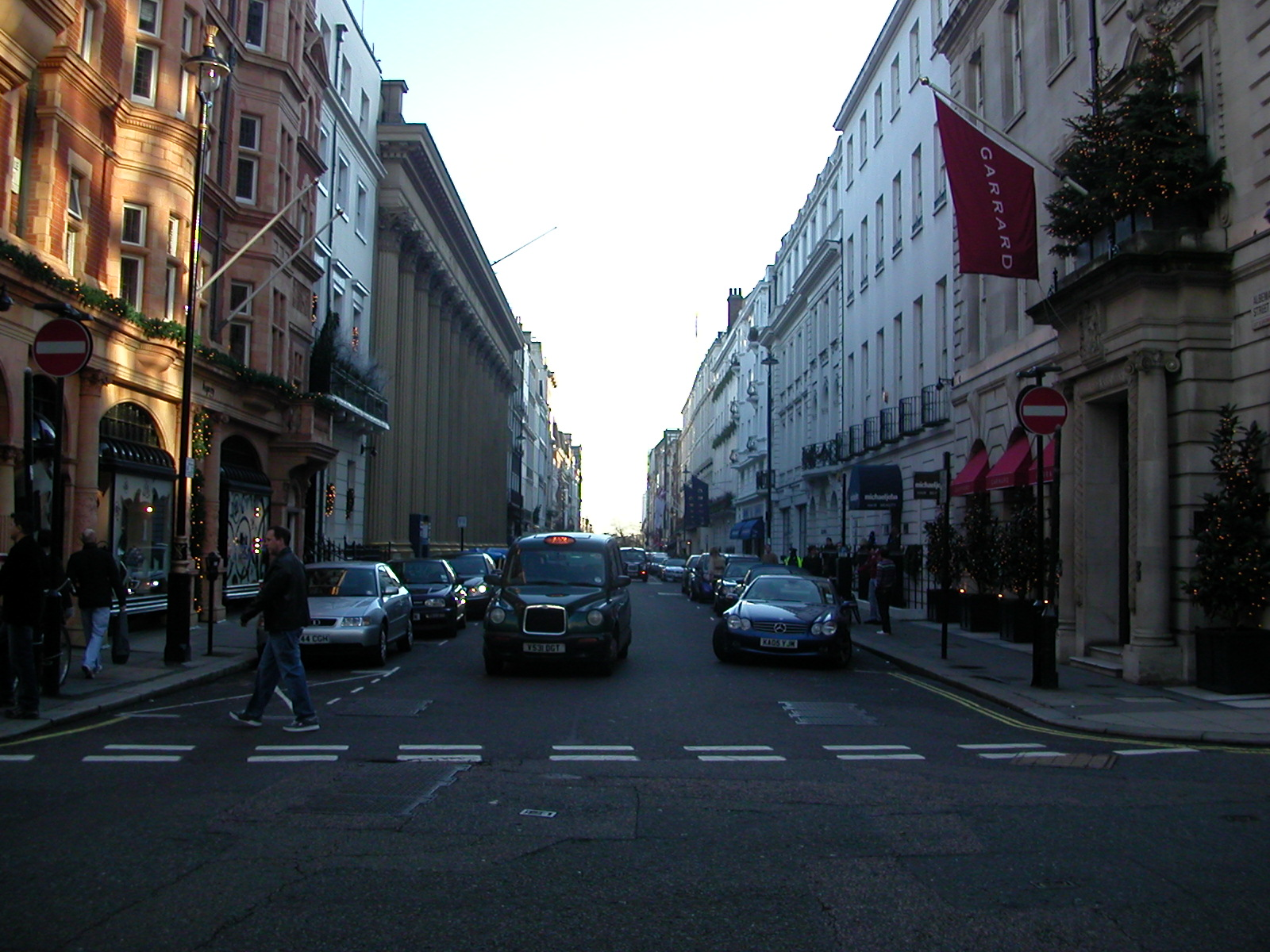
Southward view of Albemarle Street, from the Grafton Street junction.

Albemarle Street is a street in Mayfair in central London, off Piccadilly. It has historic associations with Lord Byron, whose publisher John Murray was based here, and Oscar Wilde, a member of the Albemarle Club, where an insult he received led to his suing for libel and to his eventual imprisonment. It is also known for its art galleries and the Brown's Hotel is located at 33 Albemarle Street.

== History ==
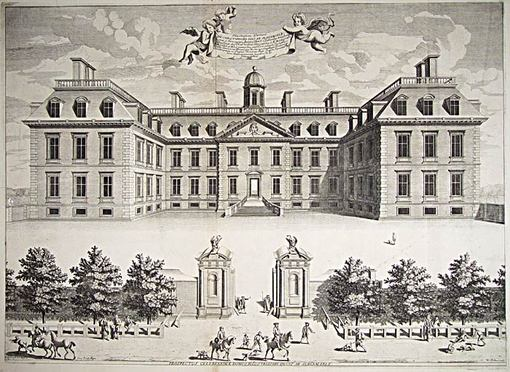
View of Clarendon House, now demolished. Albemarle Street runs through the centre of the site of the house.

Albemarle Street was built by a syndicate of developers headed by Sir Thomas Bond. The syndicate purchased a Piccadilly mansion called Clarendon House from Christopher Monck, 2nd Duke of Albemarle in 1684, which had fallen into ruin due to neglect caused by the dissolute duke's spendthrift ways. It was sold for £20,000, a fifth less than the duke had paid for it only nine years previously despite the land values in the area increasing in the intervening period. The house was demolished and the syndicate proceeded to develop the area. At that time the house backed onto open fields and the development of the various estates in Mayfair was just getting underway. The syndicate also built Old Bond Street, Dover Street and Stafford Street.

Albemarle Street was the first one-way street created for the purpose of better traffic flow in London. The decision was taken after a series of lectures by Humphry Davy at the Royal Institution caused long traffic jams in the capital because of the horrendous queues formed by horsedrawn carriages bringing in the eager audience. Albemarle Street was made a one-way street to avoid further incidents of such congestion.

== Notable residents ==
Robert Harley, 1st Earl of Oxford and Earl Mortimer (1661–1724), a leading minister of Queen Anne, had a house in Albemarle Street where he died in 1724.

Victor Spencer, 1st Viscount Churchill (1864–1934), a Page of Honour to Queen Victoria and British peer, was born at 32 Albemarle Street.

Anne Lister (1791–1840), a notable early 19th-century lesbian, stayed at 29 Albemarle Street in rooms owned by Hawkins, who also had premises in Dover Street. In June 1834 Anne Lister stayed at number 13 with her wife Ann Walker (1803–1854).

The Albemarle Club was originally in Albemarle Street and relocated to Dover Street nearby before its closure. Oscar Wilde was a member. In 1895, the Marquess of Queensberry left his calling card for Wilde with the infamous note "For Oscar Wilde, posing as a somdomite" [sic]. This led to Wilde's failed libel action and subsequent criminal prosecution.

The publisher John Murray was located at 50 Albemarle Street during the 19th and 20th centuries. Lord Byron's memoirs were destroyed in the fireplace on the first floor after his death. Sir John Betjeman, the poet and broadcaster was another Murray author. Murray also published Charles Darwin's The Origin of Species in 1859.

Captain O.M.WATTS, at 49 Albemarle Street was once the large showroom and mail order department of O. M. Watts a master mariner and nautical author who founded and ran his ship chandlers and yacht brokerage until his death in 1985.

Frenchman Alexander Grillion opened Grillion's Hotel at No. 7 in 1803. Louis XVIII stayed here in 1814, before his return to France. It was also the meeting place of Grillion's dining club. The Royal Thames Yacht Club was later based here.

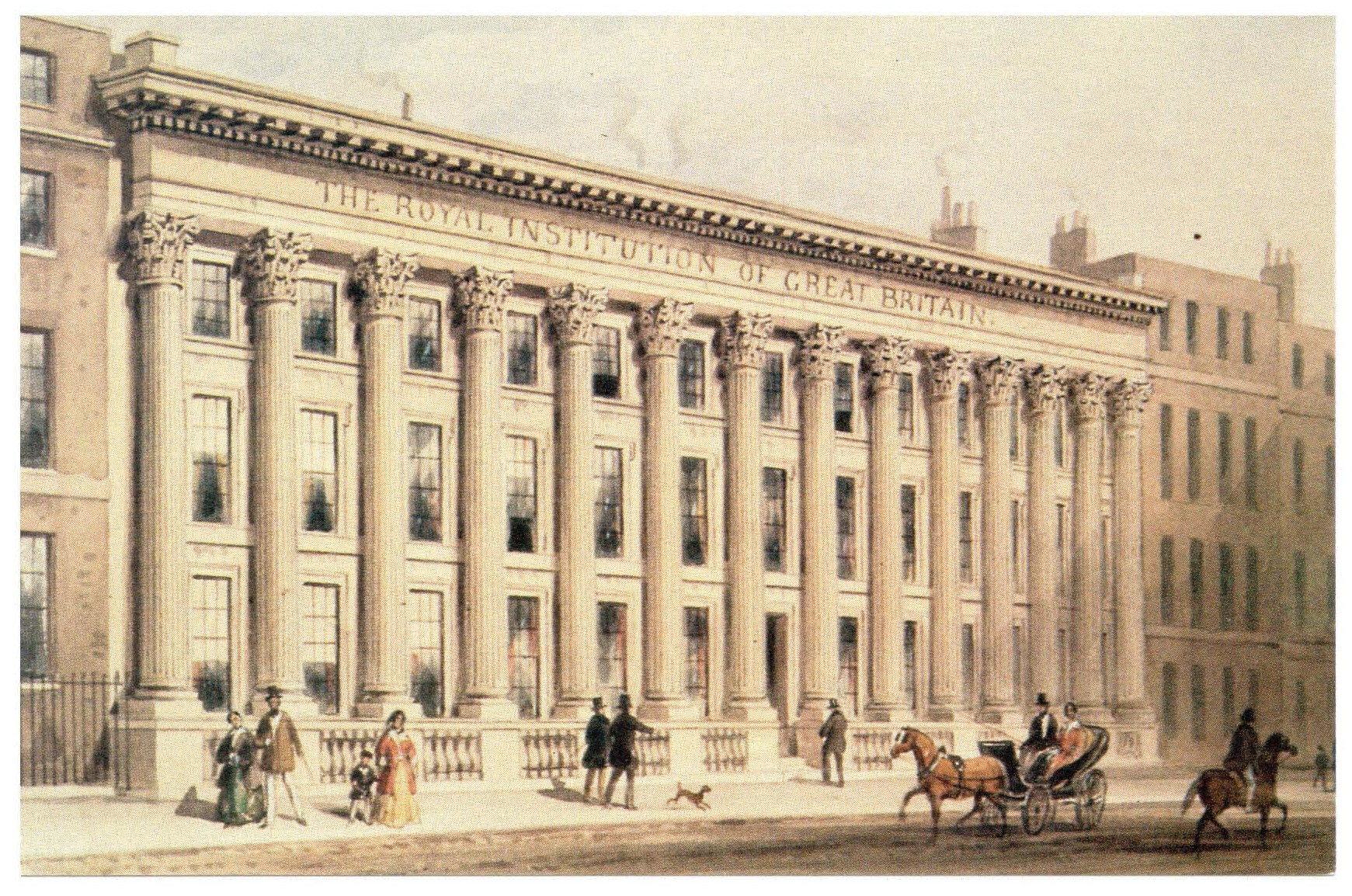
The Royal Institution in Albemarle Street, c. 1838

The Royal Institution is at 21 Albemarle Street and forms an imposing backdrop on the street with its row of classical columns on its frontage. The building has been greatly enlarged and redeveloped since 1799 when the Institution was founded, and is now a Grade I listed building. Because of the Institution's popularity (through its scientific lectures), Albemarle Street became London's first one-way street to avoid traffic problems.

The naturalist Thomas Huxley founded the X Club as a dining club meeting for the first time on 3 November 1864 at St George's Hotel, Albemarle Street, with a select membership of nine proponents of the evolutionary "new reformation" in naturalism who supported the ideas of Charles Darwin and became increasingly influential in late 19th century science.

Rev. William Webb Ellis (1806–1872) was an Anglican clergyman who is famous for allegedly being the inventor of Rugby football whilst a pupil at Rugby School. He graduated from Oxford with a BA in 1829 and received his MA in 1831. He entered the Church and became chaplain of St George's Chapel, Albemarle Street, London (c. 1800–1903). Here he published his Sermons: Preached in St. George's Chapel, Albemarle Street; to Which Is Added, an Essay On the Prophecies Relative to Christ. The Chapel was built on instructions of Lord Suffield who lived on Albemarle Street and leased land at number 27 on which at some time between 1800 and 1811 a proprietary chapel, St George's, was built (demolished in the early twentieth century).

The Beaux-Arts building, the Mellier, at 26b Albemarle Street originally the home and showroom of Charles Mellier & Co. Mellier was born in France and became a successful high quality cabinet maker and decorator; one of his most famous commissions was for the liner RMS Mauretania.

In 1921 Lendrum Motors moved to Mayfair, taking the recently vacated ground floor and basement premises of the Mellier building, creating a fashionable and stylish motor showroom, renamed it ‘Buick House’ and from 1923 known as Lendrum & Hartman Limited. It was a major London importer, and sole UK concessionaires of Buick and Cadillac cars from North America between 1919 and 1968. It became the most prestigious car dealership in the country, having sold a Buick to the Prince of Wales, later King Edward VIII in 1935. Today the building is renamed the Mellier again, has been transformed by architect Eric Parry from commercial use into apartments.

In the 1950s, Ernő Goldfinger's design for two office buildings at 45–46 Albemarle Street was praised for its sensitivity to the surrounding Georgian architecture.

The private member's club Oswald's is based in a town house at 25 Albemarle Street.

== Galleries ==
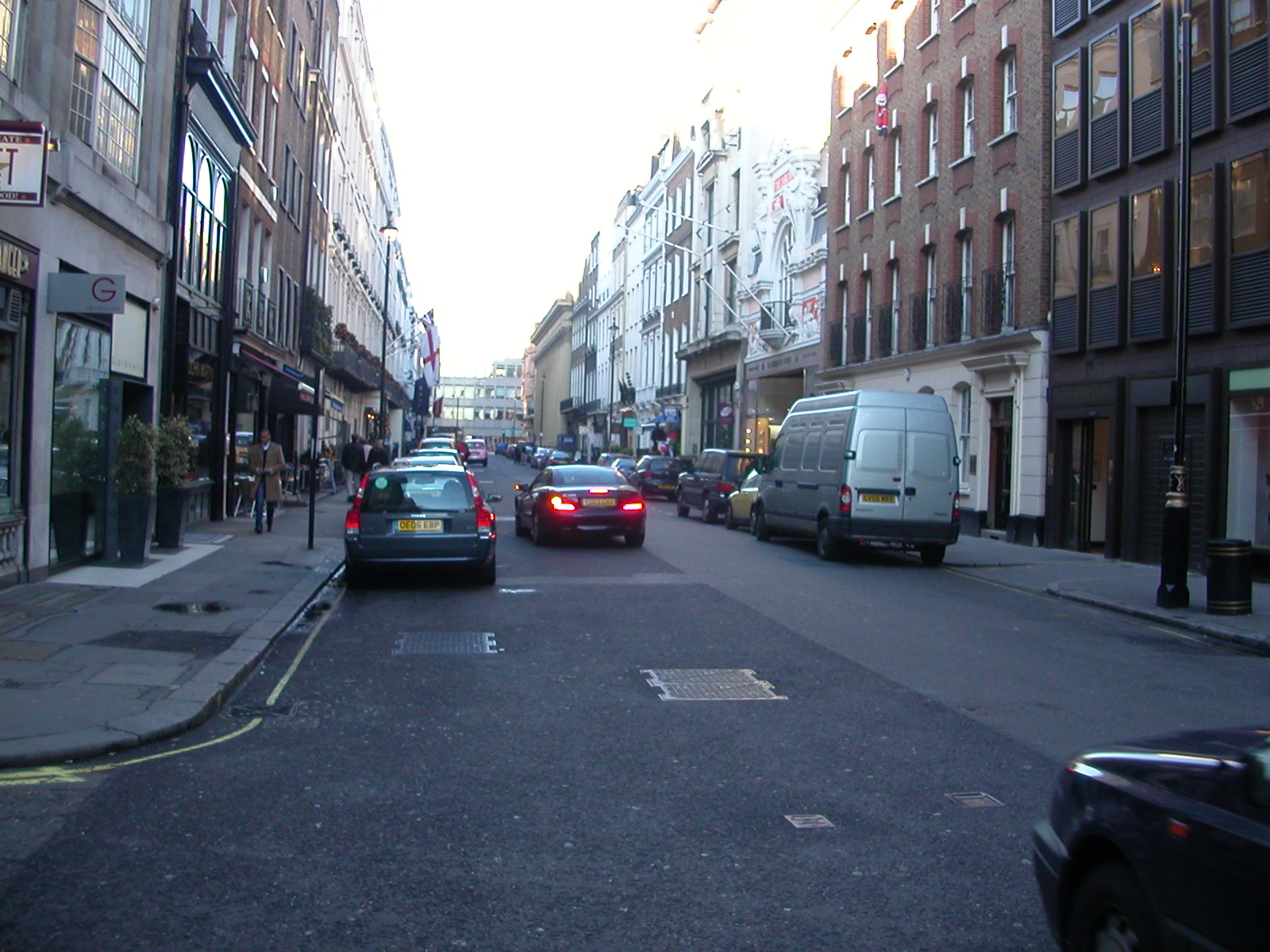
Northward view of Albemarle Street, from the Stafford Street junction.

The street is host to a number of art galleries. These include:

- Connaught Brown, 2 Albemarle Street
- The Archeus Gallery, 3 Albemarle Street
- Marlborough Fine Art, 6 Albemarle Street
- W. H. Patterson Fine Arts, 19 Albemarle Street – until 2012
- Phillips de Pury & Company, 25–26 Albemarle Street
- Mazzoleni Art, 27 Albemarle Street – until 2022
- The Grosvenor Gallery, 37 Albemarle Street
- John Martin of London, 38 Albemarle Street
- Gallery of African Art, 45 Albemarle Street
- The Albemarle Gallery, 49 Albemarle Street
- Faggionato Fine Arts, 49 Albemarle Street (first floor)

== Location ==
To the south-east, the street adjoins Piccadilly. Running parallel with Albemarle Street to the south-west is Dover Street and to the north-east are New Bond Street and Old Bond Street. The nearest tube station is Green Park.

== See also ==
- Duke of Albemarle
- Earl of Albemarle
- List of eponymous roads in London
