= Skipton House =

British government office building in the Elephant and Castle area of central London

Coordinates: 51.49603°N 0.10065°W

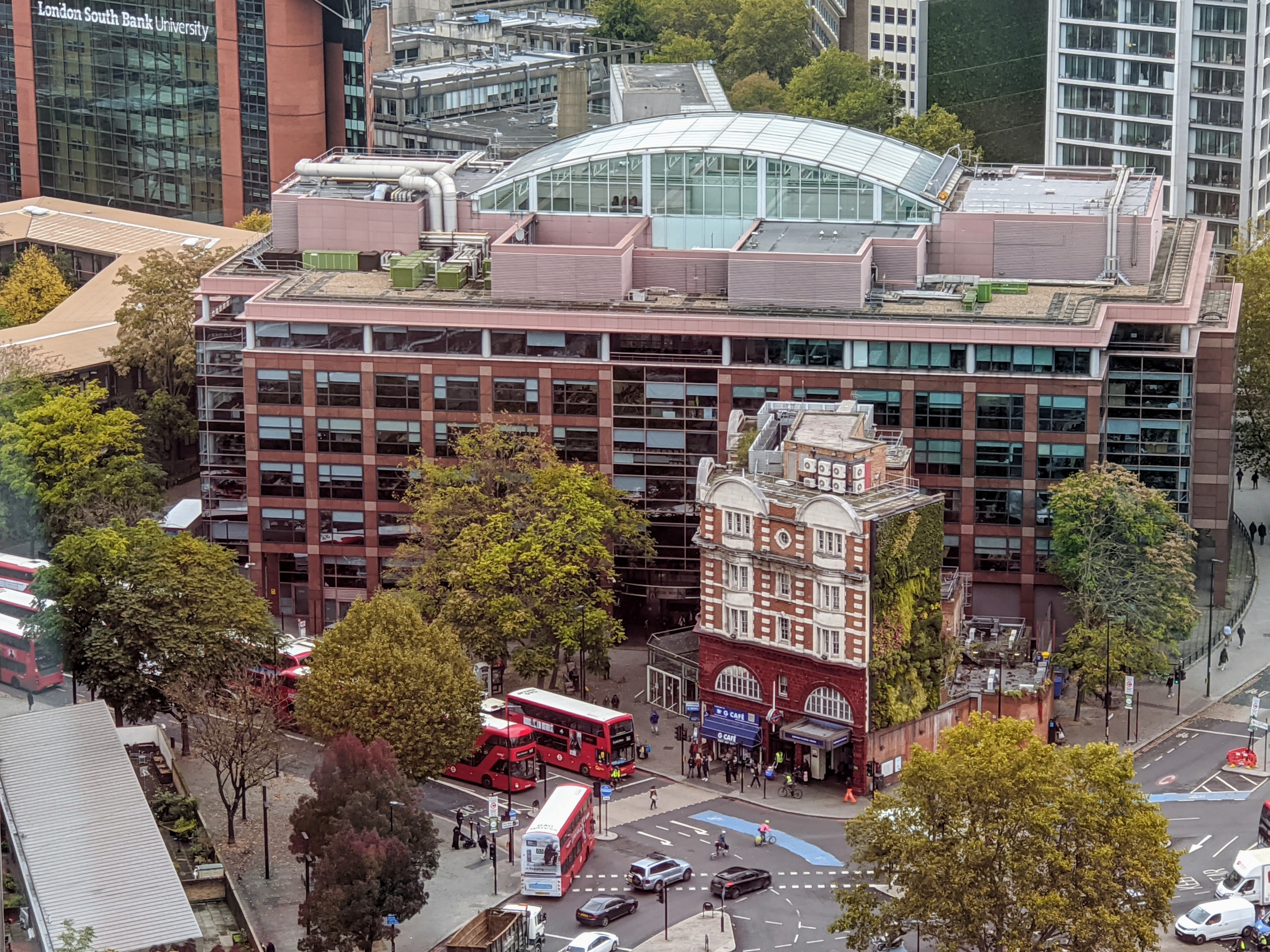
Skipton House, October 2019 (with the Bakerloo line Elephant & Castle tube station in front)

Skipton House is a high specification office building in Elephant and Castle, Central London.

It was built for a Japanese bank and then sold on to accommodate staff of the Department of Health who were moved out of Alexander Fleming House. The project architect was Paul Cayford. Its address is 80 London Road SE1 6LH, next to the Bakerloo line entrance to Elephant & Castle tube station. It was opened by Virginia Bottomley, who was then Secretary of State for Health, on 15 February 1993. Its floor area is 250,000 sq ft (23,000 m^{2}).

From outside, the two outstanding characteristics are the dark brown marble cladding and the impressive entranceway. Inside, there is a large glass-topped central atrium, with the second to sixth floors having balconies.

When the Information Centre for Health and Social Care was created on April 1, 2005, its London office was in Skipton House. It has since moved to Leeds, West Yorkshire. Furthermore, during 2005 substantial numbers of Department of Health staff were moved in from nearby Eileen House and Hannibal House where those leases had expired. In 2011 a further tranche of Department of Health staff were moved in from nearby New Kings Beam House. It is the headquarters of the NHS Counter Fraud Authority.

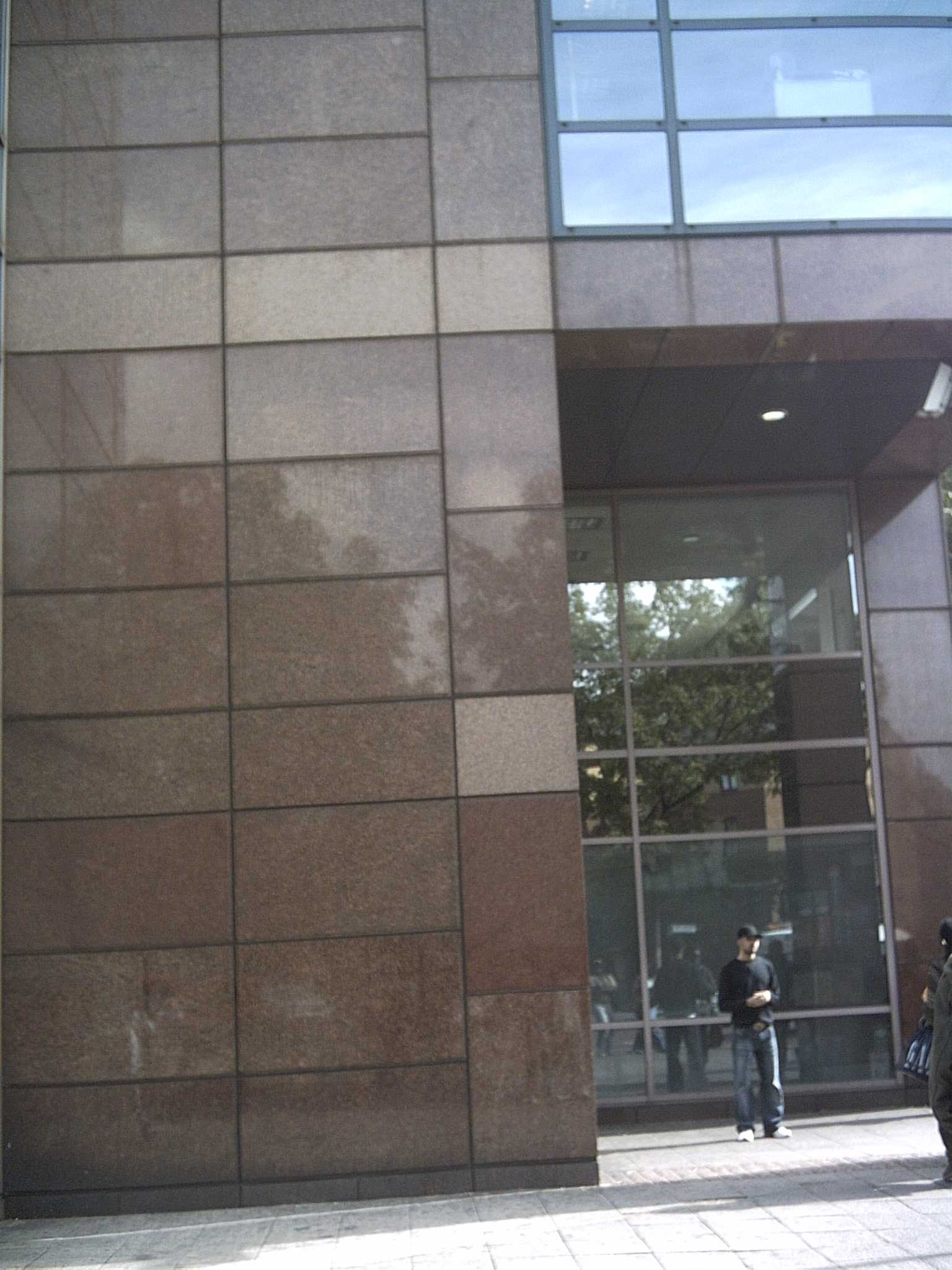
The marble cladding

== Redevelopment plans ==
Plans were approved in 2016 to demolish Skipton House as well as the adjacent hostel and London South Bank University Perry Library to make way for a mixed-use development designed by Skidmore, Owings & Merrill containing high-end flats, offices and restaurants. The plans were subsequently withdrawn due to a lack of agreement between the landowners and in 2019 a new planning application was submitted to re-clad and add six more storeys to the existing building. The application was referred back to Southwark London Borough Council by the Greater London Authority on the basis that it "does not comply with the London Plan and the draft London Plan". The GLA suggested possible remedies including contributing towards the cost of a new Elephant and Castle Northern line London Underground station, the developer submitted an updated plan to Southwark London Borough Council which approved it in November 2020 and the plans now await approval by the Mayor of London.
