= Swedish Quays =

Coordinates: 51°29′39″N 0°02′15″W

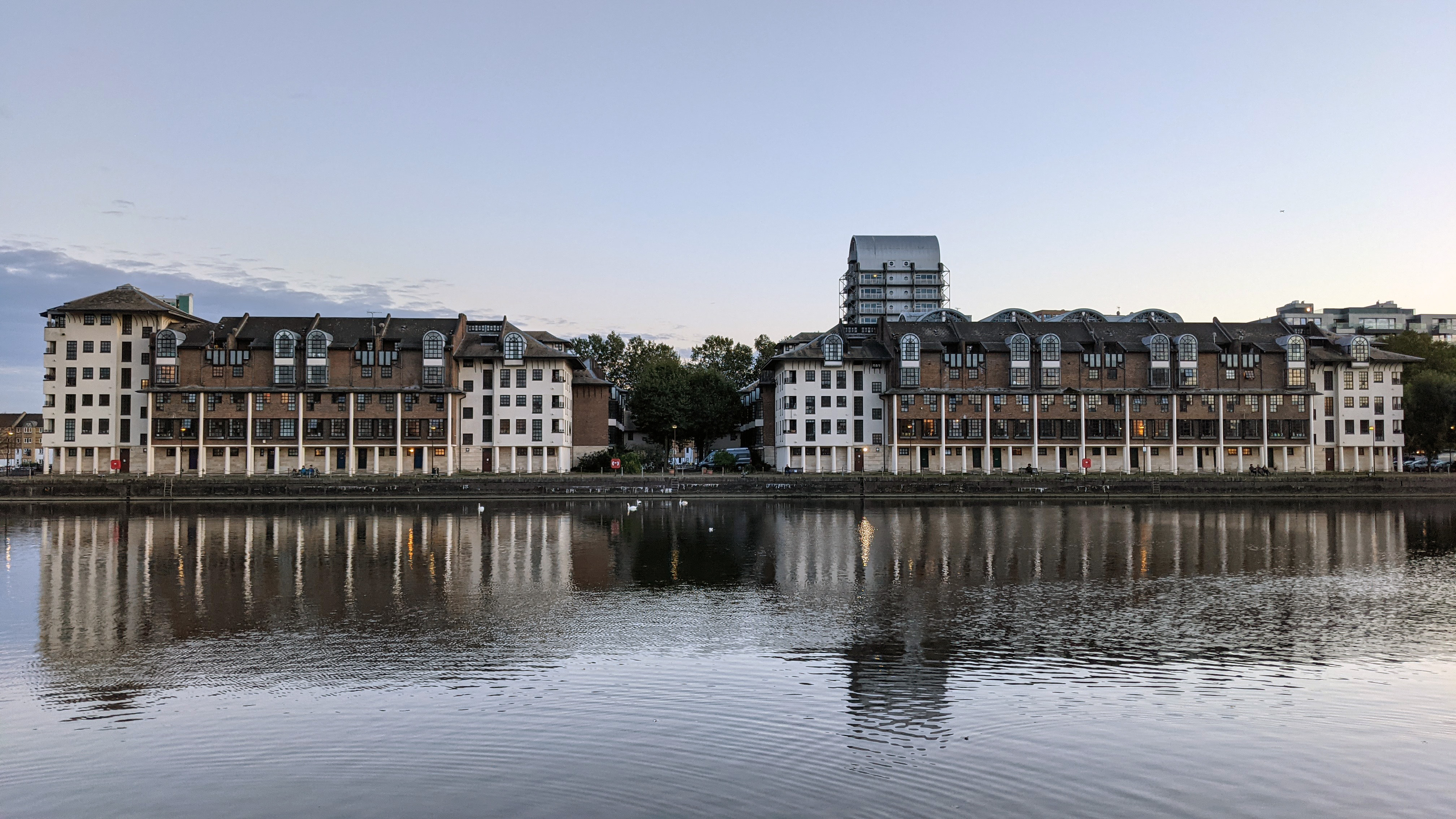
Swedish Quays viewed from the Greenland Dock side

Swedish Quays at 1–95 Rope Street, London, is a group of flats and houses that is Grade II listed with Historic England. It was built between 1986 and 1990 and designed by David Price and Gordon Cullen.
