= 2 Willow Road =

Historic property in Hampstead, England

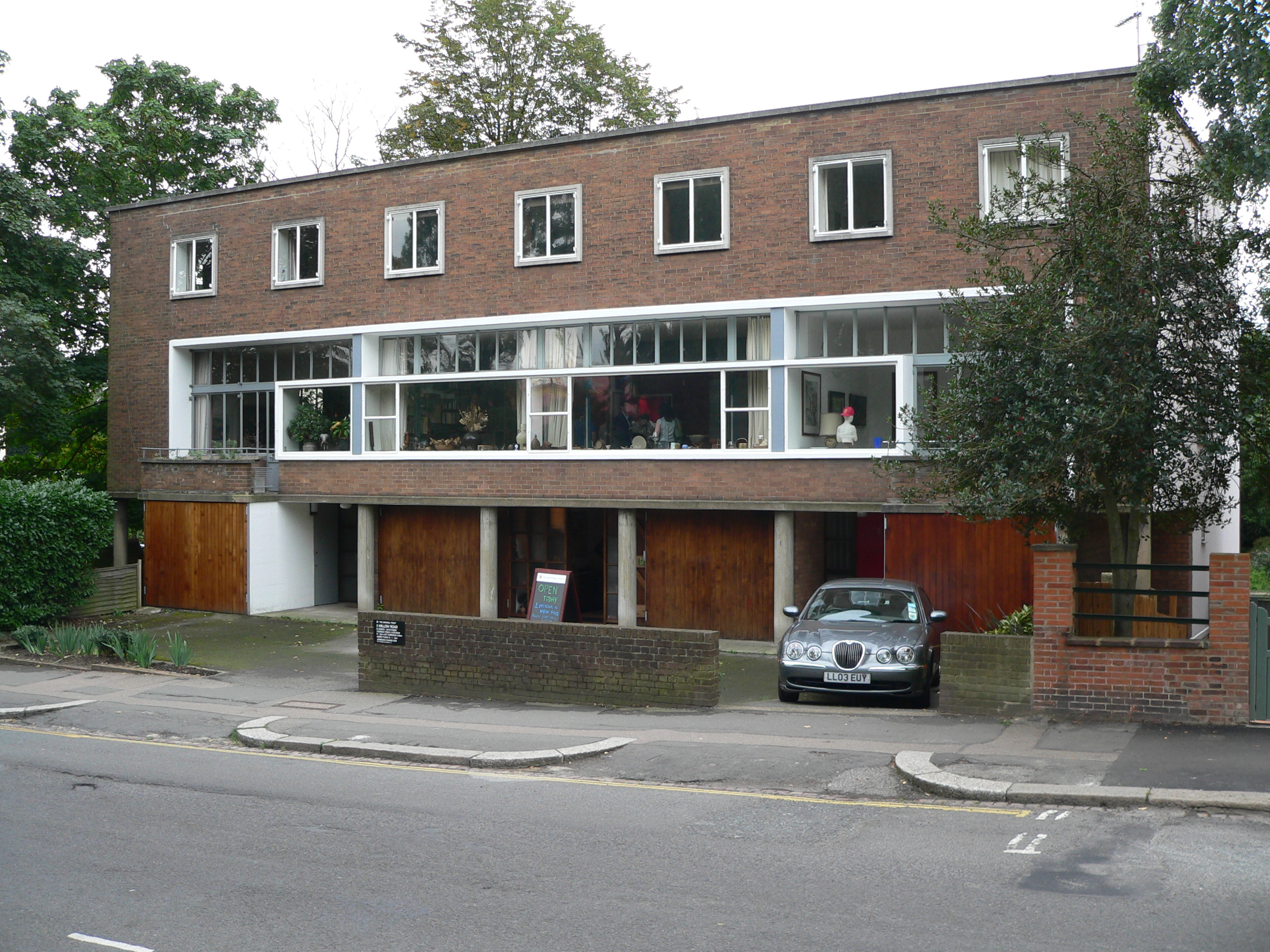
- 1–3 Willow Road

- Location within London Borough of Camden

General information
- Type: Terraced house
- Architectural style: Modernist
- Location: Hampstead; London, NW3; England
- Coordinates: 51.5572°N 0.1691°W
- Completed: 1939; 87 years ago
- Owner: National Trust

Design and construction
- Architects: Ernő Goldfinger

Listed Building – Grade II*
- Official name: 1, 2 and 3, Willow Road
- Designated: 14 May 1974
- Reference no.: 1379196

Website
- www.nationaltrust.org.uk/2-willow-road

2 Willow Road is part of a terrace of three houses in Hampstead, London designed by architect Ernő Goldfinger and completed in 1939. It has been managed by the National Trust since 1995 and is open to the public. It was one of the first Modernist buildings acquired by the Trust, giving rise to some controversy. Goldfinger lived there with his wife Ursula and their children until his death in 1987.

== History ==
Initially, Goldfinger planned to build a block of studio flats, believing that flat living was a more socially conscious choice for modern architects. This idea was rejected by the London County Council in 1936. He then revised his designs to include a block of three houses, retaining the concrete frame integral to Goldfinger's Modernist philosophy. He submitted these revised plans at the end of 1937. The construction of 2 Willow Road, was completed in the summer of 1939 constructed from concrete and a facing of red brick.

A number of cottages were demolished to allow for the construction, which was strongly opposed by a number of local residents including novelist Ian Fleming and the future Conservative Home Secretary Henry Brooke. This incident led Fleming to name his villain Auric Goldfinger by way of revenge. No. 2, which Goldfinger designed specifically as his own family home, is the largest of the three houses and features a spiral staircase designed by engineer Ove Arup at its core. The building is supported by a concrete frame, part of which is external, leaving room for a spacious uncluttered interior, perhaps inspired by the Raumplan ideas of modernist architect Adolf Loos.

== Today ==
Goldfinger himself designed much of the furniture in No. 2, and the house also contains a significant collection of 20th-century art by Bridget Riley, Prunella Clough, Marcel Duchamp, Eduardo Paolozzi, Henry Moore and Max Ernst.

Nos. 1 and 3 remain private homes.

== In popular culture ==
Restoration of an artwork from the house featured in Series 3, Episode 5 of the BBC TV series, Hidden Treasures of the National Trust.
