= Metro Central Heights =

Grade II listed building in London, England

Coordinates: 51.49581°N 0.09924°W

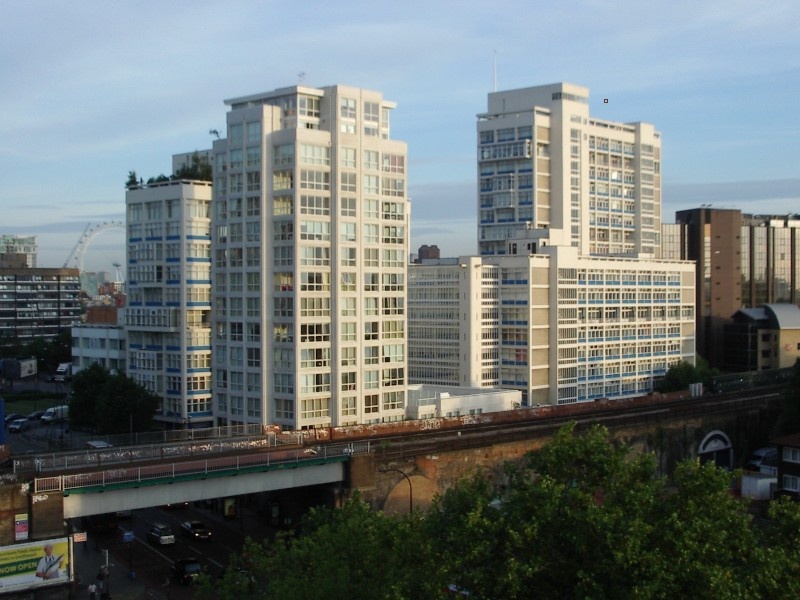
Metro Central Heights

Metro Central Heights is a group of residential buildings in Walworth in the London Borough of Southwark. It was originally known as Alexander Fleming House, a multi-storey office complex designed by Hungarian-born modernist architect Ernő Goldfinger and constructed in the early 1960s for Arnold Lee of Imry Properties.

== Design ==
The design was favoured both by the property developer Imry and by the London County Council as it promised the largest amount of lettable space and therefore the best financial return for the site. Standing at a height of approximately 55 metres at its highest point, the initial plan included three freestanding blocks. Among these, two were seven stories tall, and one was eighteen stories tall, arranged around a central piazza.

It is located on Newington Causeway on the east side of the busy Elephant and Castle junction in inner south-east London.

Ernő Goldfinger proposed three main components of modern architecture, "the permanent structure; the much less permanent services and an even more fleeting component, the human requirements". These applied directly to the development where its eventual use was not known at the time of construction. Therefore, the internal design of the building was made as flexible as possible, providing open decks which could be readily subdivided and services re-routed.

The building's original tenant was the Department of Health and Social Security, known as the Ministry of Health at the time, which probably led to its being named Alexander Fleming House, after the discoverer of penicillin. The development became its headquarters, and shortly afterwards Ernő Goldfinger was commissioned to design two additional blocks, D and E.

The building received a Civic Trust Award in 1964.

The Health Department's headquarters became notorious for sick building syndrome and the DHSS civil servants were moved out in the early 1990s to a new headquarters across the road, first of all to Hannibal House and then Skipton House. The Executive staff moved to new headquarters on Whitehall, Richmond House.

The design flexibility served the building well when it was saved from demolition and converted into a residential development and renamed "Metro Central Heights" by St George Plc (a division of Berkeley Group Holdings) in 1997. It was narrowly missed off English Heritage's roll of post-war buildings worthy of listing around the same time. The conversion cured the sick building syndrome, and added a gym and swimming pool to the complex. It now contains some 400 studio to three-bedroom flats which are in constant demand, especially by "young urban professionals" who value Elephant and Castle's proximity to the City and West End. At the time of conversion the distinctive bare concrete specified by Goldfinger was painted white.

Planning permission was granted on appeal for a further 15-storey block by St George Plc named Vantage Metro Central on what was formerly the development's surface car park in February 2004. This was completed in late 2008.

This had originally been the site of both the Odeon cinema, also designed by Ernő Goldfinger but demolished by Imry in 1988, and the huge Trocadero cinema that was cleared for blocks D and E of the development itself.

Metro Central Heights became a listed building on 9 July 2013, when the Minister for Culture, Ed Vaizey MP accepted English Heritage's recommendation that it should be listed at Grade II.

== See also ==
- Balfron Tower
