= Ernő Goldfinger =

Hungarian-born architect and furniture designer (1902-1987)

- Born: 11 September 1902; Budapest, Hungary
- Died: 15 November 1987 (aged 85); London, England
- Education: Beaux-Arts de Paris
- Occupations: Architect; furniture designer
- Spouse: Ursula Blackwell
- Children: 3
- Buildings: 2 Willow Road; Alexander Fleming House; Balfron Tower; Carradale House; Trellick Tower

Ernő Goldfinger RA (11 September 1902 – 15 November 1987) was a Hungarian-born British architect and furniture designer. He moved to the United Kingdom in the 1930s, and became a key member of the Modernist architectural movement. He is most prominently remembered for designing residential tower blocks, some of which are now listed buildings.

== Biography ==
Goldfinger was born in Budapest to a Jewish family. The family business was forestry and saw-mills, which led Goldfinger to consider a career in engineering until he became interested in architecture after reading Hermann Muthesius's Das englische Haus, a description of English domestic architecture around the turn of the twentieth century.

Goldfinger moved to Paris in 1921, after the defeat and collapse of the Austro-Hungarian Empire. In 1923, he went to study at the Beaux-Arts de Paris in the atelier of Léon Jaussely, and in the following years got to know many other Paris-based architects, including Auguste Perret, Mies van der Rohe and Le Corbusier. In 1929, before finishing his studies, Goldfinger established a partnership and worked on a number of interior designs and an extension to a holiday home at Le Touquet.

He was strongly influenced by the publication of Le Corbusier's Vers une architecture, and became a fervent admirer of Le Corbusier's former mentor, Auguste Perret, an expert in designing reinforced concrete structures and an inspiration for Goldfinger when designing his own home. In the early 1930s, Goldfinger met and married Ursula Blackwell, heiress to the Crosse & Blackwell fortune. Goldfinger was based in the UK for the remainder of his career.

=== Modernist in London ===
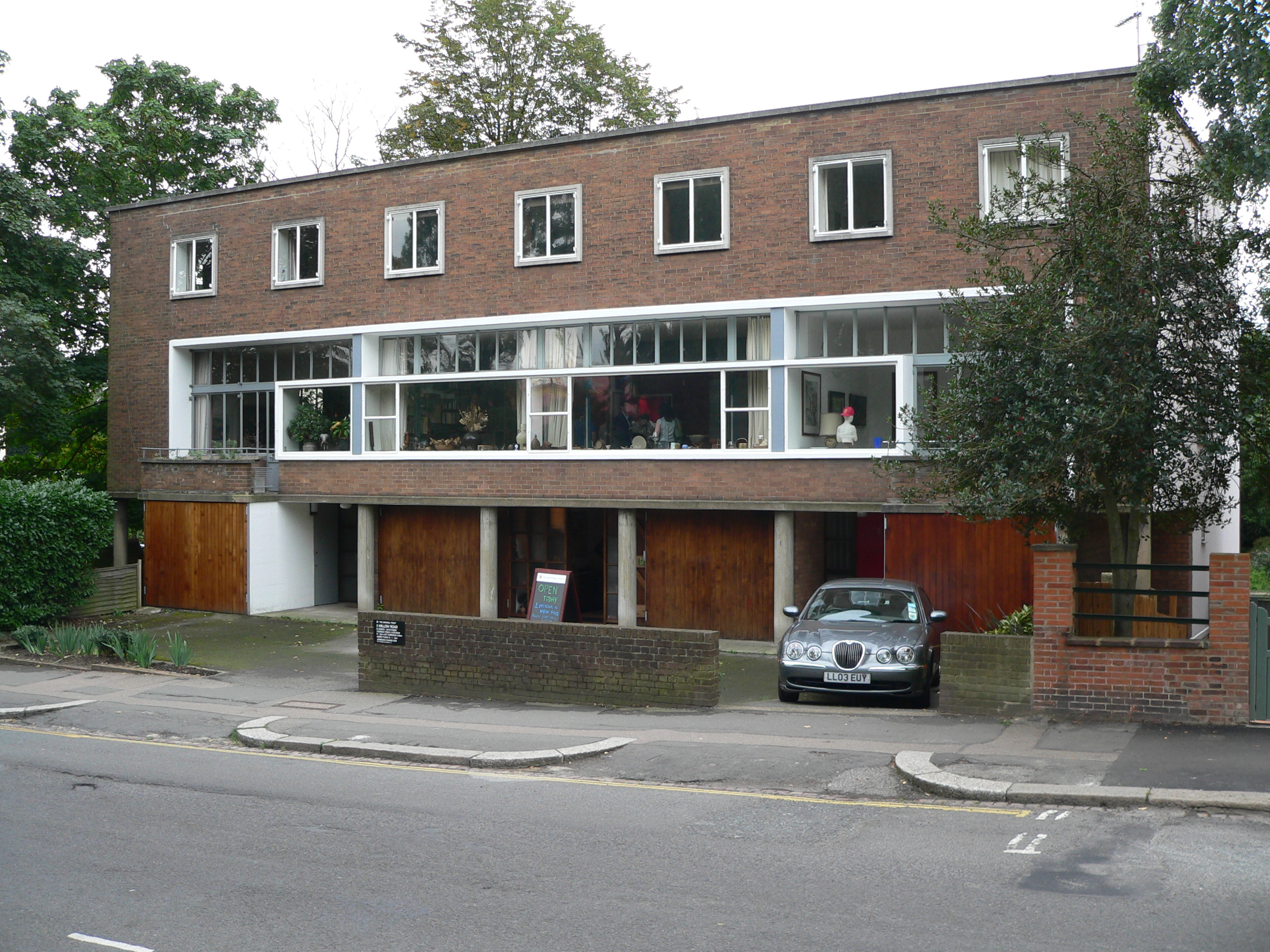
1–3 Willow Road

In 1934, Ernő and his wife, Ursula, moved to a flat in Highpoint I, London. Before World War II, Goldfinger built three houses (including his own) at 1–3 Willow Road in Hampstead, North London, and another at Broxted, Essex. His own house, 2 Willow Road, is now in the care of the National Trust.

=== Post-World War II ===
After the war, Goldfinger was commissioned to build new offices for the Daily Worker newspaper and the headquarters of the British Communist Party. In the 1950s, he designed two London primary schools, including Greenside Primary School in west London, from prefabricated pre-cast concrete with brick infill for the London County Council. A cottage forming part of one of these schools, Brandlehow School in Putney, was demolished by a rogue developer who was prosecuted in 2008, and ordered to restore the building to "exactly match" its former appearance. The other school was Westville Road School in Shepherd's Bush, renamed Greenside Primary School in 1987, now a Grade II* listed building.

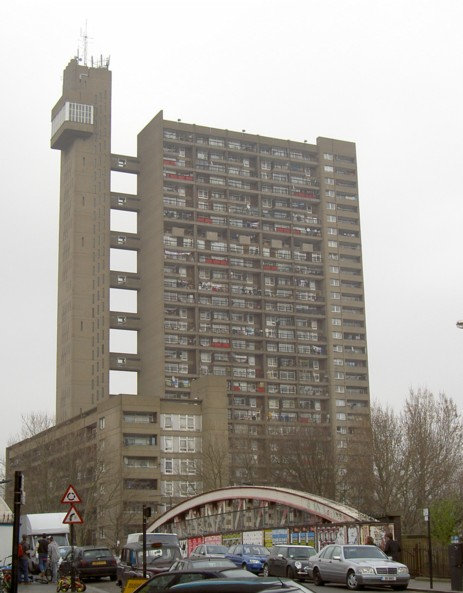
Trellick Tower, Kensal Town

On the site of George Coles's Trocadero cinema in south-east London, Goldfinger built Alexander Fleming House for the Ministry of Health, and the Odeon Elephant & Castle, which opened in 1966, and has since been demolished.

==== Rise of the high rise ====
In an attempt to solve the huge shortage of housing in the country following World War II, during which nearly 4 million houses had been destroyed or damaged, the British Government began to see high-rise buildings as a solution. Goldfinger rose to prominence in England as a designer of tower blocks.

Among his most notable buildings of the period were the 27-floor Balfron Tower and the adjacent eleven-storey Carradale House in Poplar, which served as models for the similar 31-floor Trellick Tower in Kensal Town (started 1968, completed 1972). These three buildings are notable examples of Brutalist architecture.

=== Personal life ===
Goldfinger was known as a humourless man given to notorious rages. He sometimes fired his assistants if they were inappropriately jocular, and once forcibly ejected two prospective clients for imposing restrictions on his design.

A discussion on a golf course about Ernő with Goldfinger's cousin prompted Ian Fleming to name the James Bond adversary and villain Auric Goldfinger after Ernő—Fleming had been among the objectors to the pre-war demolition of the cottages in Hampstead that were removed to make way for Goldfinger's house at 2 Willow Road. Goldfinger consulted his lawyers when Goldfinger was published in 1959, which prompted Fleming to threaten to rename the character 'Goldprick', but eventually decided not to sue; Fleming's publishers agreed to pay his costs and gave him six free copies of the book.

Goldfinger married Ursula Blackwell in 1933 in Paris. They had three children: Peter, Liz and Michael. He died on 15 November 1987, at the age of 85.

== Legacy ==
Although Goldfinger enjoyed living in his own buildings, they were unpopular among both the public and many post-modernist architects. Towards the end of the 20th century Goldfinger's work became more appreciated. Trellick Tower is now a Grade II* listed building and has become something of a design icon, appearing on T-shirts, paintings, and in the lyrics of the song "Best Days" by Blur. The few privately owned flats within fetch high prices at sale. Balfron Tower and Carradale House are also listed Grade II, while an adjacent building by Goldfinger's studio, the 14-storey Glenkerry House, is run as a housing co-operative and is regarded as a model for management of buildings of the type.

In 2000, Ernő Goldfinger's estate endowed a sum of money to foster links between Hungary and the United Kingdom by sponsoring young Hungarian architectural students to study, travel, or work in the UK. Their intention was to honour his achievements, his commitment to his profession, and his lifelong support for his compatriots. Six RIBA Goldfinger Scholarships were awarded from 2002 to 2011.

== Buildings ==
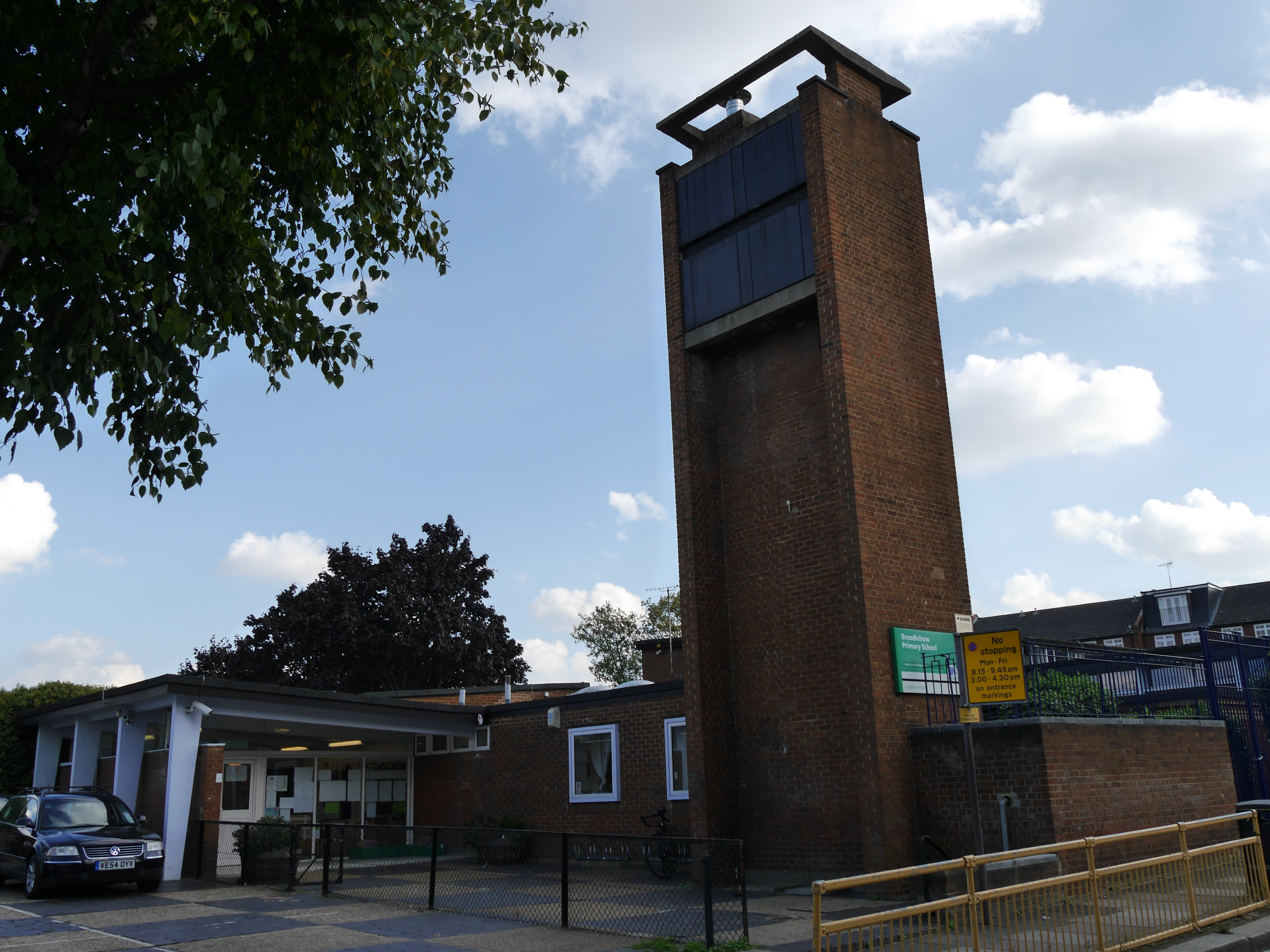
Brandlehow School, Putney, London

- 1, 2 & 3 Willow Road, Hampstead, London. (Listed II*, 1974)
- 10 Regent's Park Road, Camden, London. (Listed II, 1998)
- 45-46 Albemarle St, Green Park, London. (Listed II, 1991)
- Balfron Tower, Tower Hamlets, London. (Listed II, 1996; II* 2014)

- Carradale House (Listed II, 2000)
- Glenkerry House (Listed II, 2015)

- Benjamin's Mount, Windlesham. (Listed II*, 1999)
- Brandlehow School, Putney, London. (Listed II, 1993) And the attached caretaker's cottage
- Cheltenham Estate and Edenham Way, Kensington & Chelsea (Listed II, 2012)

- Trellick Tower (Listed II*, 1998)

- Fulton House, on the campus of Swansea University
- Goldfinger House (Listed II, 1995), Shirley, West Midlands.
- Greenside School, Hammersmith, London. (Listed II*, 1993)
- Haggerston Girls' School and School House, (Listed II, 2004)
- Hille House, Watford
- Metro Central Heights (Alexander Fleming House), Southwark, London. (Listed II, 2013)
- Weiss shop – 2/2a Golders Green Road, London. (Built 1935)

== Bibliography ==
- Goldfinger: "The sensation of space", "Urbanism and the spatial order" and "The elements of enclosed space", three seminal articles published in Architectural Review, November 1941 to January 1942

== Sources ==
- Nigel Warburton, Ernő Goldfinger: The Life of an Architect. Routledge, London, 2004; ISBN 978-0-415-37945-8.
