= 00 Agent =

James Bond franchise agent designation

00 Agents
- James Bond novels organization
- First appearance: Casino Royale
- Created by: Ian Fleming
- Genre: Spy/Espionage

In-universe information
- Type: Field agent

In Ian Fleming's James Bond novels and the derived films, the 00 Section of MI6 is considered the secret service's elite. A 00 (pronounced "Double O") is a field agent who holds a licence to kill in the field, at their discretion, to complete any mission. The novel Moonraker establishes that the section routinely has three agents concurrently; the film series, in Thunderball, establishes a minimum number of nine 00 agents active at that time.

== Inspiration ==
The origins of the Double O title may date to Ian Fleming's wartime service. According to World War II historian Damien Lewis in his book Churchill's Secret Warriors, agents of the Special Operations Executive (SOE) were given a "0" prefix when they became "zero-rated" upon completion of training in how to kill. As part of his role as assistant to the head of naval intelligence, Rear Admiral John Godfrey (himself the inspiration for M), Fleming acted as liaison to the SOE.

Another hypothesis holds that Fleming, who at one time owned a house in St Margarets Bay outside Dover, was inspired by the local 007 bus route which ran between Canterbury and the Kent coast. Having found the codename for his protagonist, it may be that this was then expanded to a host of "00" agents of which Bond was numbered seventh. The 007 route still exists to this day, operated by National Express as a coach service between Victoria coach station and Dover.

== Description ==
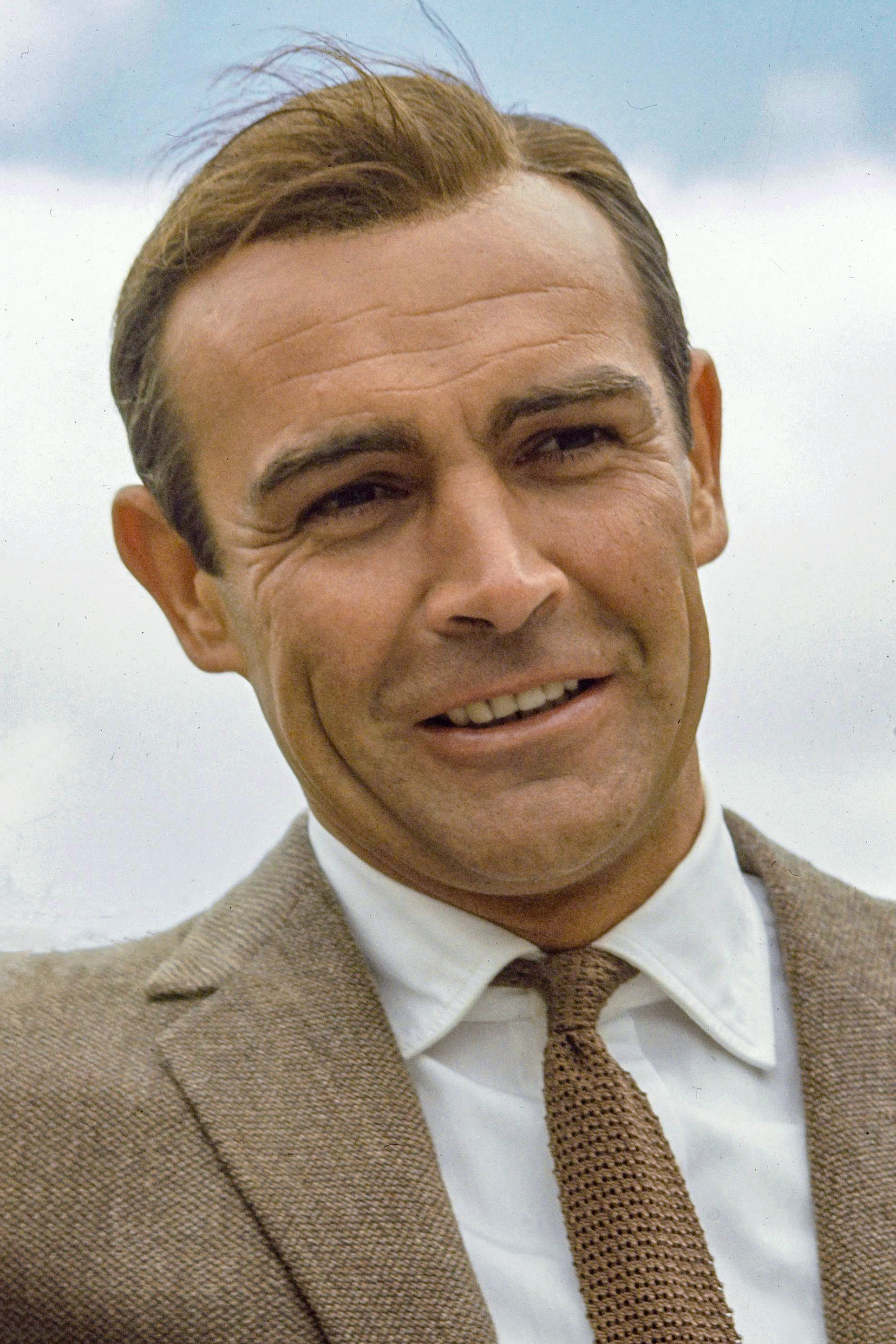
Sean Connery as James Bond during the shooting of Goldfinger (1964) in Andermatt, Switzerland

In the first novel, Casino Royale, and the 2006 film adaptation, the 00 concept is introduced and, in James Bond's words, "means you've had to kill a chap in cold blood in the course of some job". Bond's 00 number (007) was awarded to him because he twice killed in fulfilling assignments. (This differentiates from deadly force used by non-00 agents in the course of self-defence or offensive action; plus, in the original time frame of the novel—the early 1950s—many MI6 agents would have had recent war service.) In the second novel, Live and Let Die, the 00 number designates a past killing; not until the third novel, Moonraker, does the 00 number designate a licence to kill. Thereafter, the novels are ambiguous about whether a 00 agent's licence to kill is limited, with varying accounts in Dr. No, Goldfinger, and The Man with the Golden Gun.

Per Fleming's Moonraker, 00 agents face mandatory retirement at 45; John Gardner contradicts this in his novels, depicting a 00 agent in his fifties. Sebastian Faulks' Devil May Care features M giving Bond a choice of when to retire.

Fleming himself mentions only five 00 agents in all. According to Moonraker, James Bond is the most senior of three 00 agents; the two others were 008 and 0011. The three men share an office and a secretary named Loelia Ponsonby. Later novels feature two more 00 agents; 009 is mentioned in Thunderball and 006 is mentioned in On Her Majesty's Secret Service. Other authors have elaborated and expanded upon the 00 agents. While they presumably have been sent on dangerous missions as Bond has, little has been revealed about most of them.

In the films, the 00 section is a discrete area of MI6, whose agents report directly to M, and tend to be sent on special assignments and troubleshooting missions, often involving rogue agents (from Britain or other countries) or situations where an "ordinary" intelligence operation uncovers or reveals terrorist or criminal activity too sensitive to be dealt with using ordinary procedural or legal measures, and where the aforementioned discretionary "licence to kill" is deemed necessary or useful in rectifying the situation. The World Is Not Enough introduces a special insignia for the 00 Section. Bond's fellow 00 agents appear receiving briefings in Thunderball and The World Is Not Enough. The latter film shows a woman in one of the 00 chairs. In Thunderball, there are nine chairs for the 00 agents; Moneypenny says every 00 agent in Europe has been recalled, not every 00 agent in the world. Behind the scenes photos of the film reveal that one of the agents in the chairs is female as well. As with the books, other writers have elaborated and expanded upon the 00 agents in the films and in other media. In GoldenEye, 006 is an alias for Alec Trevelyan (Sean Bean), while in No Time to Die the 007 codename is assigned to Nomi (Lashana Lynch) after Bond (Daniel Craig)'s retirement from MI6. As of 2021, Trevelyan and Nomi are the only 00 agents other than Bond to play a major role in an Eon Productions film, with all other appearances either being brief or dialogue references only.

== List of 00s ==
The following lists are of the known 00 agents of the British Secret Service who exist in the Ian Fleming novels and short stories, the officially licensed novels, the EON movies, or in the official video games or comic strips.

=== From Ian Fleming's Bond stories ===
00-agent	Name	Description
006	Unnamed	006, a Royal Marine commando, is mentioned in the novel On Her Majesty's Secret Service.
007	James Bond	James Bond is the only Agent 007. In the novel You Only Live Twice, Bond was transferred into another branch and given the number 7777, suggesting there was no active agent 007 in that time; he is later reinstated as 007 in the novel The Man with the Golden Gun.
008	Bill	In the novel Moonraker, 008 (called "Bill" by Bond) is mentioned as being on recuperative leave after returning from a mission behind the Iron Curtain. In the novel Goldfinger, Bond thinks that 008 would likely avenge Bond by killing Auric Goldfinger. As Bond thinks this, he ruminates that 008 is "a good man, more careful than Bond".
009	Unnamed	Referred to in the novel Thunderball.
0011	Unnamed	Mentioned in the novel Moonraker as vanishing while on assignment in Singapore.

=== From Bond stories by other authors ===
00-agent	Name	Description
000	Conrad Harthrop-Vane	Mentioned in the Kim Sherwood novel Double or Nothing chapter 4 as having recently been on a mission with 005. He is nicknamed Triple-O.
001	Edward Donne	Appears in the Raymond Benson novel DoubleShot providing security for a peace conference in Gibraltar.
002	Elizabeth Dumont	Mentioned in the Kim Sherwood novel Double or Nothing chapter 4 as having recently been killed in Dubai.
003	Johanna Harwood	Appears in the Kim Sherwood novel Double or Nothing as a main character. She was formerly a surgeon and girlfriend of James Bond before coming to MI-6.
004	Frederick Wardner, Scarlett Papava, Joseph Dryden	A 004 appears in the Raymond Benson novel The Facts of Death. In the Sebastian Faulks novel Devil May Care, Bond girl Scarlett Papava is unveiled as 004, replacing the previous agent who was killed in Berlin. Joseph Dryden appears in the Kim Sherwood novel Double or Nothing as a main character. He was formerly an SAS soldier in Afghanistan before being injured and moving to MI-6.
005	Stuart Thomas, Ventnor	Was 005 until defective eyesight impaired his marksmanship, and he was made head of Station G (Greece) in the Kingsley Amis novel Colonel Sun. Ventnor is mentioned in the Kim Sherwood novel Double or Nothing chapter 4 as having recently fallen to his death on a mission with 000 Harthrop-Vane.
006	Major Jack Giddings	In The Moneypenny Diaries: Guardian Angel, 006 is named as Major Jack Giddings and second to Bond in the 00 section.
007	James Bond	As above. In the John Gardner novels, agent 007 is the remaining active 00-agent as the section was disbanded in the 1980s. This was later contradicted in the Raymond Benson novels. In Anthony Horowitz's continuation novel, set before the events of Casino Royale, an unnamed agent 007 is murdered, which leads to James Bond taking over the code-number in Forever and A Day, thus marking his first ever assignment as a 00-agent.
008	Donovan	Mentioned in the Kim Sherwood novel Double or Nothing chapter 1 as having recently been killed in the Central African Republic.
009	Sid Bashir	Appears in the Kim Sherwood novel Double or Nothing as a main character. He was personally mentored by James Bond.
0010	Unnamed, Anna Savarin	Unnamed agent referred to in the Benson novel The Man with the Red Tattoo. Anna Savarin is mentioned in the Kim Sherwood novel Double or Nothing chapter 4 as having recently been killed in Basra.
0011	Harry Mace	Mentioned in the Kim Sherwood novel Double or Nothing chapter 4 as having recently disappeared on assignment in Singapore. This is in keeping with Fleming's use of the code number (see above).
0012	Sam Johnston	Although unmentioned on screen, Benson's The World Is Not Enough novelization has Bond investigating 0012's death at story's start (seen in a photograph of a dark-haired man, in the film).

=== From the Eon film franchise ===
00-agent	Name	Description
001	Unnamed	A 001 appeared in Thunderball.
002	Bill Fairbanks; John	A 002 first appears in Thunderball. In The Man with the Golden Gun, 002, named Bill Fairbanks, is stated to have been shot through the neck and killed by Francisco Scaramanga, in Beirut, Lebanon, in 1969. In The Living Daylights film, another Agent 002, named "John", played by Glyn Baker; was training at Gibraltar, with 004 and 007. 002 was "killed" and eliminated from the exercise when he landed close to a waiting SAS guard.
003	Unnamed	003 first appears in Thunderball and is the first 00 agent to be played by a woman. A different 003 (this time played by a man) is found dead, in Siberia, in A View to a Kill.
004	Unnamed	004 first appears in Thunderball, where he is played by Frederick Warder. In The Living Daylights, either he or another 004 accompanied 002 and 007 to Gibraltar; he is murdered by an imposter KGB agent who tags the body with "Death to Spies" in Russian after his support rope is cut and he is sent plummeting down a cliff to his death.
005	Unnamed	005 appears in Thunderball.
006	Alec Trevelyan	A 006 first appears in Thunderball, where he is portrayed by Peter Roy. When 006 was used again thirty years later in GoldenEye it was not mentioned whether this was meant to be the same character or a replacement. In GoldenEye 006 was named Alec Trevelyan, and portrayed by Sean Bean. He is apparently shot and killed while on a mission with Bond, but later reveals that he faked his death, and is the main antagonist in the film.
007	James Bond; Nomi	See above. Three years after the retirement of James Bond in Spectre, Nomi is assigned the 007 name and maintains it for two years before she temporarily transfers it back to Bond in No Time to Die.
008	Unnamed	In Goldfinger M threatens to replace 007 with agent 008. Later in the film, Bond tells Auric Goldfinger, "...if I fail to report, 008 replaces me," and Goldfinger sarcastically replies, "I trust he will be more successful." A 008 later appears in Thunderball. Whether it is the same one mentioned in Goldfinger is unknown. In The Living Daylights, M again threatens to replace 007 saying: "I'll recall 008 from Hong Kong."
009	Unnamed	009 first appears in Thunderball. Either he or another 009 (dressed as a clown) was killed by Mischka and Grischka after the opening credits in Octopussy by throwing a knife into his back as he tries to escape them. Bond later avenges 009 by killing them both. In The World Is Not Enough, M assigned another 009 to kill Renard; despite putting a bullet in his head, Renard lives, with the bullet slowly killing off his senses. In Spectre, Q laments that a new Aston Martin originally intended to be used by 007, has been reassigned to 009 following Bond's destruction of several buildings in Mexico City. A switch inside the car labelled "Atmosphere" is later revealed to begin playing 009's personal choices in music.
Unknown	Unidentified	Two films, Thunderball and The World Is Not Enough, have scenes in which Bond joins groups of other 00 agents for briefings. In Thunderball, only fleeting glimpses of these individuals are provided. In The World Is Not Enough several are visible as they receive instructions from M and her assistant, Bill Tanner, including one female 00 agent.

=== From computer and video games ===
00-agent	Name	Description
003	Jack Mason	In the Everything or Nothing video game (2004), 003 is Jack Mason, who is shot in the gut and killed by Nikolai Diavolo, a villain connected with the villain Max Zorin from A View to a Kill.
004	Aidan Flemmings	In the GoldenEye 007 video game, on the Silo mission briefing, Q mentions to 007 to "remember to treat the timed explosives with respect – you remember what happened to 004 in Beirut"; it is unclear whether he speaks of another agent or one of the ones in the EON films.
007	James Bond	See above.
008	Bill Timothy	In the video game James Bond 007, 008 gives Bond an exploding pen before dying.
009	Rhys Beckett	A rogue 009 featured in 007 First Light, described as "a master manipulator". Beckett is one of three 00-agents who were falsely identified as moles by MI6's quantum computer THEIA and framed by its creator Nicholas Webb, causing the 00 program to be shut down. After years in hiding, Beckett resurfaces to expose THEIA's mistakes, but is murdered by Webb's forces.
Unknown	Jonathan "GoldenEye" Hunter	A former 00-agent featured in GoldenEye: Rogue Agent. He was shot in the right eye, and was dismissed by MI6 for "reckless brutality". He joined up with Auric Goldfinger against the shooter, Dr. Julius No, and eventually received a gold-hued artificial eye as a replacement, which granted him several hidden abilities. After killing both Goldfinger and Dr. No, he becomes Ernst Stavro Blofeld's personal bodyguard.
Unknown (possibly 007)	John Greenway	A former 00-agent featured in 007 First Light, who is reassigned to a desk job after the 00 program was initially shuttered, and later brought on to train new recruits when the 00 program is reactivated. While his former number is never confirmed, the game implies he was the original 007.

=== From other official media ===
00-agent	Name	Description
002	John Winter	Winter, agent 002, is kidnapped and brainwashed by renegade Russian operative Col. Lev Makar in the 1983 Semic comic Liquidate Bond. Winter is described as tough, ruthless, and cunning, with almost superhuman strength, and is used to assassinate multiple public figures. He almost kills Bond multiple times, before being himself killed by Russian troops.
003	Unnamed	A 003 appears in an anthology comic book by Dynamite Entertainment, Reflections of Death. Described as the best due to "always thinking a step ahead of everyone", he is a treacherous entity who gave up state secrets when he was captured and tortured by a rogue group of disavowed operatives and imprisoned in the Kuril Islands. Bond sets off for his rescue, but eventually finds 003 irredeemable when the latter drops his loyalty to his country.
007	James Bond	See above.
008	Bill Timothy	008 is mentioned to have been murdered in the comic book VARGR for which 007 himself avenges the death of his colleague by taking the life of the latter's killer.
009	Peter Smith	The graphic novels Deadly Double and Serpent's Tooth feature a fourth Agent 009.
0013	Briony Thorne	A female 00-agent appearing in the comic strip Fear Face (published 18 January 1971 to 20 April 1971 in The Daily Express). Thorne is revealed to be a double agent for China.
Unknown	Agent York	Killed in the comic strip River of Death (published 24 June 1969 to 29 November 1969 in The Daily Express). Agent York is a 00 agent but his number is not revealed.
Unknown	Suzi Kew	A recurring character in the Daily Express comic strip series of the 1960s and 1970s, Suzi Kew is a 00 agent but her number is not revealed.

=== False 00 agents from Casino Royale (1967) ===
The 1967 film adaptation of Fleming's first novel, Casino Royale, spoofed the EON film series. As part of its storyline, Sir James Bond (David Niven), after having assumed the position of M, mandates that all MI6 agents – male and female – be renamed James Bond 007 in order to confuse enemy agents of SMERSH.

00-agent	Name	Description
007	Evelyn Tremble	Baccarat master. Portrayed by Peter Sellers.
007	Vesper Lynd	Bond's former lover. Portrayed by Eva Green in Casino Royale (2006) as well as portrayed by Ursula Andress in the 1967 Casino Royale parody .
007	Miss Moneypenny	Daughter of Bond's retired secretary, with the same name as her mother. Portrayed by Barbara Bouchet.
007	Mata Bond	Illegitimate daughter of Bond and Mata Hari. Portrayed by Joanna Pettet.
007	The Detainer	A female agent who ultimately is the one to defeat the villain, Dr. Noah. Real name unrevealed. Portrayed by Daliah Lavi.
007	Cooper	An agent who closely resembles the stereotypical image of Bond. Portrayed by Terence Cooper.
007	Jimmy Bond	Nephew of Sir James Bond who, tired of being looked down upon (due to his short stature and meek demeanour), creates the persona of Dr. Noah, head of the evil organization SMERSH. As his duplicity is not known until late in the film, he technically falls under his uncle's naming edict. Portrayed by Woody Allen.
007	"James Bond"	Prior to renaming all MI6 agents, Sir James mentions that the agency had given "my name and number" to another individual. Two dialogue references are made to this Bond: one has McTerry (M) expressing concern that he may be targeted by assassins; later in the film, it is said that he has left the service and entered the world of television.

== See also ==
- List of James Bond parodies and spin-offs
