= Bond girl =

Female love interest or sidekick of James Bond

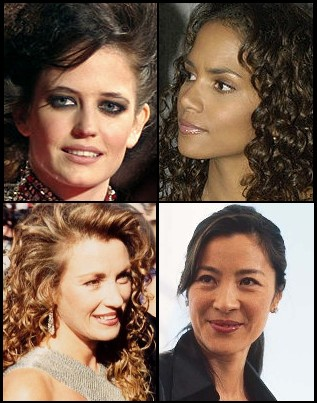
Clockwise from top left are actresses Eva Green, Halle Berry, Michelle Yeoh, and Jane Seymour

"Bond girl" is a term for a female character who is a love interest, ally or adversary of the character James Bond in a novel, film, or video game. According to Lisa Funnell, an editor of multiple books about the James Bond series, the "Bond girl" is a staple of the franchise and has been a powerful contributor to its worldwide success. Funnell believes the term is overused in popular discourse, as it is applied to almost every female character who appears in a Bond film.

== Inspiration ==
James Bond was created by the author Ian Fleming, who wrote a series of novels featuring the character. Ben Macintyre of The Times has speculated that Fleming's lover Muriel Wright may have been a powerful inspiration for his female characters. Macintyre describes both Wright and Bond girls as "pliant and undemanding, beautiful but innocent, outdoorsy, physically tough, implicitly vulnerable and uncomplaining, and then tragically dead, before or soon after marriage." Wright was a wealthy model, a skilled skier and a talented polo player. After her death in 1944, a devastated Fleming called her "too good to be true".

== In film ==
According to Fox News Magazine, Ursula Andress (as Honey Ryder) in Dr. No (1962) is widely regarded as the first Bond girl, although Eunice Gayson as Sylvia Trench and Zena Marshall as Miss Taro appeared onscreen before Andress in the same film. Goldfinger (1964), the third film, established the Bond girl as regularly appearing in Bond films.

There is no set rule on what kind of person a Bond girl will be or what role she will play. She may be an ally or an enemy of Bond, pivotal to the mission or simply there for her beauty or sex appeal. There are female characters such as Judi Dench's M; Camille Montes (Olga Kurylenko), a Bolivian intelligence agent who teams up with Bond in Quantum of Solace; and Bibi Dahl (Lynn-Holly Johnson) in For Your Eyes Only, who are not romantic interests of Bond, and hence may not be considered Bond girls. It has been argued that M's pivotal role in the plot of Skyfall qualifies her as a Bond girl or Bond woman.

There have been many attempts to break down the numerous Bond girls into a top 10 list for the entire series; characters who often appear in these lists include Anya Amasova (from The Spy Who Loved Me, portrayed by Barbara Bach); Pussy Galore (from Goldfinger, portrayed by Honor Blackman); Contessa Teresa di Vicenzo (from On Her Majesty's Secret Service, portrayed by Diana Rigg); and often ranked Number 1 on the list, Honey Ryder (from Dr. No, portrayed by Ursula Andress). Entertainment Weekly put "Bond bathing suits" on its 2009 end-of-the-decade "best-of" list.

=== Roles and impact ===
Roald Dahl said that when writing the script for You Only Live Twice, he was advised to use three Bond girls: The first should die "preferably in Bond's arms" early, the second a villain whom Bond seduces before she dies in an unusual and gory way midway, and the third survives to the end of the film. In several, the Bond girl is revealed, after her tryst with Bond, to be a villainess. Examples are Fatima Blush (Barbara Carrera) in Never Say Never Again (1983), Elektra King (Sophie Marceau) in The World Is Not Enough (1999), and Miranda Frost (Rosamund Pike) in Die Another Day (2002). The Timothy Dalton films of the 1980s introduced the "Bond woman", who is equal to and challenges Bond, but he remains the heterosexual hero; they are depicted with Dalton and later Bonds and their cars and gadgets, implying that all are possessions that Bond can use and dispose.

As of 2013, there had been only two films in which James Bond falls in love with the Bond girl. The first was On Her Majesty's Secret Service (1969), in which Countess Tracy di Vicenzo (Diana Rigg) marries Bond but is shot dead by Irma Bunt and Ernst Stavro Blofeld at the story's end. The second was Vesper Lynd (Eva Green) in Casino Royale (2006). Bond confesses his love to her and resigns from MI6 so that they can have a normal life together. He later learns that she had been a double agent working for his enemies. The enemy organisation Quantum had kidnapped her former lover and had been blackmailing her to secure her cooperation. She ends up actually falling in love with Bond, but dies, as Quantum is closing in on her, by drowning in a lift in a building under renovation in Venice.

=== Effect on career ===
The role of a Bond girl, as it has evolved in the films, is typically a high-profile part that can sometimes give a major boost to the career of unestablished actresses, although a number of Bond girls were well-established beforehand. For instance, Diana Rigg and Honor Blackman were both cast as Bond girls after they had already become stars in the United Kingdom for their roles in the television series The Avengers. Teri Hatcher was already known for her role as Lois Lane in the television series Lois & Clark: The New Adventures of Superman before she was cast in Tomorrow Never Dies. A few years after playing a Bond girl, she became one of the most highly paid actresses on television, starring in Desperate Housewives.

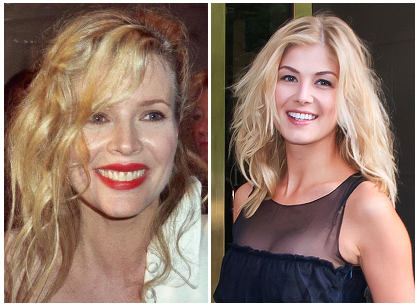
Kim Basinger, who played Domino Petachi in Never Say Never Again (1983), and Rosamund Pike, who played Miranda Frost in Die Another Day (2002)

Albert R. Broccoli's original choice for the role of Domino Derval was Julie Christie following her performance in Billy Liar in 1963. It seems he was disappointed when he met her so instead he considered Raquel Welch after seeing her on the cover of the October 1964 issue of Life magazine. Welch, however, was hired by Richard Zanuck of 20th Century Fox to appear in the film Fantastic Voyage the same year instead. French actress Claudine Auger was ultimately cast in the role. Thunderball launched Auger into a successful European film career but did little for her in the United States.

The producers encountered difficulty in casting the female lead in Casino Royale (2006), due to the perception among many leading actresses that appearing in a Bond film could hinder their careers. Catherine Zeta Jones was one of several actresses who turned down a role in the film. However, there is plenty of evidence to the contrary, with several former Bond girls going on to have very high profile acting careers. Of the earlier actresses, Ursula Andress and Honor Blackman both had well regarded careers, and Jane Seymour—who was an unknown when she was cast in Live and Let Die—later won a Primetime Emmy Award for Outstanding Supporting Actress in a Limited or Anthology Series or Movie at the 40th Primetime Emmy Awards in 1988 for playing Maria Callas in the TV movie Onassis: The Richest Man in the World and then became a household name playing the title role of Dr. Michaela Quinn in her TV series Dr. Quinn, Medicine Woman. Since Michael G. Wilson and Barbara Broccoli took over producing the films in the mid-1990s, several actresses have also won or been nominated for an Oscar: Kim Basinger in 1998 (Best Supporting Actress for L.A. Confidential), Halle Berry in 2002 (who won Best Actress for Monster's Ball while she was filming Die Another Day), Rosamund Pike (nominated for Best Actress for Gone Girl in 2015), and Michelle Yeoh in 2023 (Best Actress for Everything Everywhere All at Once). Ultimately, the up-and-coming actress Eva Green was cast as Vesper Lynd, and won BAFTA's Rising Star Award for her performance at the 60th British Academy Film Awards.

=== Multiple appearances ===
Prior to the series being rebooted in 2006 with Casino Royale, Sylvia Trench was the only Bond girl character to appear in more than one film (Dr. No in 1962 and From Russia with Love in 1963). She was meant to be Bond's regular girlfriend, but was dropped after her appearance in the second film. Léa Seydoux, who played Madeleine Swann in Spectre, reprised her role in No Time to Die (2021).

In the Eon series, three actresses have made reappearances as different Bond girls: Martine Beswick and Nadja Regin both first appeared in From Russia with Love, and then appeared in Thunderball and Goldfinger, respectively. Maud Adams played Andrea Anders in The Man with the Golden Gun (1974) and the eponymous character in Octopussy (1983).

If the non-Eon produced films, Casino Royale (1967) and Never Say Never Again (1983), are included, several other actresses have also been a Bond girl more than once: Ursula Andress in Dr. No (1962) and Casino Royale (1967); Angela Scoular in On Her Majesty's Secret Service (1969) and Casino Royale (1967); Valerie Leon in The Spy Who Loved Me (1977) and Never Say Never Again.

== Criticism ==
Naomie Harris, who plays Eve Moneypenny in three Bond films, has criticised the term "Bond girl". In 2015, she called it demeaning and suggested that it be replaced with "Bond woman". Monica Bellucci, who became the oldest "Bond girl" at the age of 50, when she was cast in Spectre, stated: "I can't say I'm a Bond girl because I'm too mature to be a Bond girl. I say Bond lady; Bond woman."

== List of Bond girls ==
=== Ian Fleming stories ===
Title (publication date)	Bond girl
Casino Royale (1953)	Vesper Lynd
Live and Let Die (1954)	Simone "Solitaire" Latrelle
Moonraker (1955)	Gala Brand
Diamonds Are Forever (1956)	Tiffany Case
From Russia, with Love (1957)	Corporal Tatiana Romanova
Dr. No (1958)	Honeychile Rider
Goldfinger (1959)	Pussy Galore; Jill Masterton; Tilly Masterton
"From a View to a Kill" (1960)	Mary Ann Russell
"For Your Eyes Only" (1960)	Judy Havelock
"Quantum of Solace" (1960)	—N/a
"Risico" (1960)	Lisl Baum
"The Hildebrand Rarity" (1960)	Liz Krest
Thunderball (1961)	Dominetta "Domino" Vitali; Patricia Fearing
The Spy Who Loved Me (1962)	Vivienne Michel
On Her Majesty's Secret Service (1963)	Teresa di Vicenzo; Ruby Windsor
You Only Live Twice (1964)	Kissy Suzuki; Mariko Ichiban; unnamed girl
The Man with the Golden Gun (1965, posthumously)	Mary Goodnight
"The Living Daylights" (1966, posth.)	Trigger
"The Property of a Lady" (1966, posth.)	Maria Freudenstein
"Octopussy" (1966, posth.)	—N/a
"007 in New York" (1966, posth.)	Solange

Mary Goodnight was a supporting character in several Bond novels before graduating to full Bond girl in The Man with the Golden Gun. Several short stories, such as "Quantum of Solace", "The Hildebrand Rarity", "The Living Daylights", and "The Property of a Lady", feature female characters in prominent roles, but none of these women interact with Bond in a romantic way.

=== Post-Fleming stories ===
Title (publication date)	Author	Bond girl
Colonel Sun (1968)	Kingsley Amis, as Robert Markham	Ariadne Alexandrou
Licence Renewed (1981)	John Gardner	Lavender Peacock
For Special Services (1982)	John Gardner	Cedar Leiter; Nena Bismaquer
Icebreaker (1983)	John Gardner	Paula Vacker; Rivke Ingber
Role of Honour (1984)	John Gardner	Persephone "Percy" Proud
Nobody Lives for Ever (1986)	John Gardner	Sukie Tempesta
No Deals, Mr. Bond (1987)	John Gardner	Ebbie Heritage
Scorpius (1988)	John Gardner	Harriett Horner
Win, Lose or Die (1989)	John Gardner	Clover Pennington; Beatrice Maria da Ricci
Brokenclaw (1990)	John Gardner	Sue Chi-Ho
The Man from Barbarossa (1991)	John Gardner	Stephanie Adoré; Nina Bibikova
Death is Forever (1992)	John Gardner	Elizabeth "Easy" St. John
Never Send Flowers (1993)	John Gardner	Fredericka "Flicka" von Grüsse
SeaFire (1994)	John Gardner	Fredericka "Flicka" von Grüsse
COLD (1996)	John Gardner	Sukie Tempesta; Beatrice Maria da Ricci
"Blast From the Past" (1997)	Raymond Benson	—N/a
Zero Minus Ten (1997)	Raymond Benson	Sunni Pei
The Facts of Death (1998)	Raymond Benson	Niki Mirakos; Hera Volopoulos
"Midsummer Night's Doom" (1999)	Raymond Benson	Lisa Dergan; Victoria Zdrok
High Time to Kill (1999)	Raymond Benson	Helena Marksbury; Hope Kendal
"Live at Five" (1999)	Raymond Benson	Janet Davies
DoubleShot (2000)	Raymond Benson	Kimberly Feare; Heidi Taunt; Hedi Taunt
Never Dream of Dying (2001)	Raymond Benson	Tylyn Mignonne
The Man with the Red Tattoo (2002)	Raymond Benson	Reiko Tamura; Mayumi McMahon
Devil May Care (2008)	Sebastian Faulks	Scarlett Papava
Carte Blanche (2011)	Jeffery Deaver	Felicity Willing; Ophelia "Philly" Maidenstone
Solo (2013)	William Boyd	Bryce Fitzjohn; Efua Blessing Ogilvy-Grant
Trigger Mortis (2015)	Anthony Horowitz	Jeopardy Lane; Logan Fairfax; Pussy Galore
Forever and a Day (2018)	Anthony Horowitz	Joanne "Sixtine / Madame 16" Brochet
With a Mind to Kill (2022)	Anthony Horowitz	Katya Leonova
On His Majesty's Secret Service (2023)	Charlie Higson	Ragneiður Radnarsdóttir
King Zero (2026)	Charlie Higson	
All In (2026)	Dan Jones	Tiffany Case

=== Eon Productions films ===
There are several different archetypes for Bond girls: romantic interests, those who assist him, femmes fatales (who make an attempt on Bond's life), and sacrificial lambs (female allies or associates of Bond who wind up dead). Since it is debatable whether certain female characters fulfil certain tropes, the following criteria are used for determining inclusion: romantic interests have (implied) sexual encounters with Bond; those women who have a principal role in assisting Bond; femmes fatales attempt to kill Bond; sacrificial lambs have an allegiance to or affiliation with Bond, and their deaths are instigated by the main villain or his henchmen. Prominent female characters that are not included are those that may fit certain roles but not a direct category, such as women that Bond rejects (e.g. Bibi Dahl (Lynn-Holly Johnson) from For Your Eyes Only) or women that Bond has no attraction or lasting camaraderie with (e.g. Paloma (Ana de Armas) from No Time to Die).

Film	Sexual partner(s)	Main sidekick(s)	Femme(s) fatale(s)	Sacrificial lamb(s)
Dr. No	Sylvia Trench (Eunice Gayson); Miss Taro (Zena Marshall); Honey Ryder (Ursula Andress)	Honey Ryder	Miss Taro	—N/a
From Russia with Love	Sylvia Trench (Eunice Gayson); Vida (Aliza Gur); Zora (Martine Beswick); Tatiana Romanova (Daniela Bianchi)	Tatiana Romanova	Rosa Klebb (Lotte Lenya)	—N/a
Goldfinger	Jill Masterson (Shirley Eaton); Pussy Galore (Honor Blackman)	Pussy Galore	Bonita (Nadja Regin)	Jill Masterson; Tilly Masterson (Tania Mallet)
Thunderball	Patricia "Pat" Fearing (Molly Peters); Fiona Volpe (Luciana Paluzzi); Domino Derval (Claudine Auger)	Paula Caplan (Martine Beswick); Domino Derval	Fiona Volpe	Paula Caplan
You Only Live Twice	Aki (Akiko Wakabayashi); Helga Brandt (Karin Dor); Kissy Suzuki (Mie Hama)	Kissy Suzuki	Helga Brandt	Aki
On Her Majesty's Secret Service	Countess Teresa di Vicenzo (Diana Rigg); Ruby Bartlett (Angela Scoular); Nancy (Catherine Schell)	Countess Teresa di Vicenzo	Irma Bunt (Ilse Steppat)	Countess Teresa di Vicenzo
Diamonds Are Forever	Tiffany Case (Jill St. John)	Tiffany Case	Bambi (Lola Larson); Thumper (Trina Parks)	Plenty O'Toole (Lana Wood)
Live and Let Die	Miss Caruso (Madeline Smith); Rosie Carver (Gloria Hendry); Solitaire (Jane Seymour)	Solitaire	—N/a	Rosie Carver
The Man with the Golden Gun	Andrea Anders (Maud Adams); Mary Goodnight (Britt Ekland)	Mary Goodnight	—N/a	Andrea Anders
The Spy Who Loved Me	Log Cabin Girl (Sue Vanner); Harem Tent Girl (Dawn Rodrigues); Anya Amasova (Barbara Bach)	Anya Amasova	Naomi (Caroline Munro)	Felicca (Olga Bisera)
Moonraker	Corinne Dufour (Corinne Cléry); Manuela (Emily Bolton); Holly Goodhead (Lois Chiles)	Holly Goodhead	Private Jet Hostess (Leila Shenna); Blonde Beauty (Irka Bochenko)	Corinne Dufour
For Your Eyes Only	Countess Lisl von Schlaf (Cassandra Harris); Melina Havelock (Carole Bouquet)	Melina Havelock	—N/a	Countess Lisl von Schlaf
Octopussy	Magda (Kristina Wayborn); Octopussy (Maud Adams)	Octopussy	—N/a	—N/a
A View to a Kill	Kimberley Jones (Mary Stävin); May Day (Grace Jones); Pola Ivanova (Fiona Fullerton); Stacey Sutton (Tanya Roberts)	Stacey Sutton	May Day; Jenny Flex (Alison Doody); Pan Ho (Papillon Soo Soo)	May Day
The Living Daylights	Linda (Kell Tyler); Kara Milovy (Maryam d'Abo)	Kara Milovy	—N/a	—N/a
Licence to Kill	Pam Bouvier (Carey Lowell); Lupe Lamora (Talisa Soto)	Pam Bouvier	—N/a	Della Churchill (Priscilla Barnes)
GoldenEye	Caroline (Serena Gordon); Natalya Simonova (Izabella Scorupco)	Natalya Simonova	Xenia Onatopp (Famke Janssen)	—N/a
Tomorrow Never Dies	Prof. Inga Bergstrøm (Cecilie Thomsen); Paris Carver (Teri Hatcher); Wai Lin (Michelle Yeoh)	Wai Lin	—N/a	Paris Carver
The World Is Not Enough	Dr. Molly Warmflash (Serena Scott Thomas); Elektra King (Sophie Marceau); Dr. Christmas Jones (Denise Richards)	Dr. Christmas Jones	Giulietta da Vinci (Maria Grazia Cucinotta); Elektra King	—N/a
Die Another Day	Giacinta "Jinx" Johnson (Halle Berry); Miranda Frost (Rosamund Pike)	Giacinta "Jinx" Johnson	Miranda Frost	—N/a
Casino Royale	Vesper Lynd (Eva Green)	Vesper Lynd	Valenka (Ivana Miličević)	Solange Dimitrios (Caterina Murino); Vesper Lynd
Quantum of Solace	Strawberry Fields (Gemma Arterton)	Camille Montes (Olga Kurylenko)	—N/a	Strawberry Fields
Skyfall	Bond's Lover (Tonia Sotiropoulou); Sévérine (Bérénice Marlohe)	Eve Moneypenny (Naomie Harris)	—N/a	Sévérine; M (Judi Dench)
Spectre	Lucia Sciarra (Monica Bellucci); Dr. Madeleine Swann (Léa Seydoux)	Dr. Madeleine Swann	—N/a	—N/a
No Time to Die	Dr. Madeleine Swann (Léa Seydoux)	Dr. Madeleine Swann; Nomi (Lashana Lynch)	—N/a	—N/a

=== Non-Eon films ===
In addition to the Eon Productions films, there have been two Bond films produced by other studios and one television production.

The women featured in the 1967 film Casino Royale are somewhat difficult to categorise due to its nature as a spoof and its plot involving multiple "James Bonds." In this table, "romantic interests" are women to whom the original Sir James Bond shows a romantic or sexual attraction; "main sidekicks" are those who are part of Sir James' team combating SMERSH; and "femmes fatales" are those who attempt to murder any of the Bonds.

Film	Romantic interest(s)	Main sidekick(s)	Femme(s) fatale(s)	Sacrificial lamb(s)
Casino Royale (1954 television production)	Valerie Mathis (Linda Christian)	Valerie Mathis	—N/a	—N/a
Casino Royale (1967 film)	Agent Mimi (Deborah Kerr); Buttercup (Angela Scoular)	Vesper Lynd (Ursula Andress); Miss Moneypenny (Barbara Bouchet); The Detainer (Daliah Lavi); Mata Bond (Joanna Pettet)	Frau Hoffner (Anna Quayle); Giovanna Goodthighs (Jacqueline Bisset)	—N/a
Never Say Never Again	Patricia Fearing (Prunella Gee); Fatima Blush (Barbara Carrera); Lady in Bahamas (Valerie Leon); Domino Petachi (Kim Basinger)	Domino Petachi	Fatima Blush	Nicole (Saskia Cohen Tanugi)

=== Video games ===
Game	Bond girl	Actress
Agent Under Fire	Zoe Nightshade	Sydney Rainin-Smith (voice)
Agent Under Fire	Adrian Malprave	Corina Harmon (voice)
Agent Under Fire	Dr. Natalya Damescu	Beatie Edney (voice)
Nightfire	Dominique Paradis	Lena Reno (voice)
Nightfire	Zoe Nightshade	Jeanne Mori (voice)
Nightfire	Alura McCall	Kimberley Davies (voice)
Nightfire	Makiko Hayashi	Tamlyn Tomita (voice)
Everything or Nothing	Serena St. Germaine	Shannon Elizabeth
Everything or Nothing	Dr. Katya Nadanova	Heidi Klum
Everything or Nothing	Miss Nagai	Misaki Ito
Everything or Nothing	Mya Starling	Mýa
GoldenEye: Rogue Agent	Pussy Galore	Jeannie Elias (voice)
GoldenEye: Rogue Agent	Xenia Onatopp	Jenya Lano (voice)
From Russia with Love	Tatiana Romanova	Daniela Bianchi (likeness), Kari Wahlgren (voice)
From Russia with Love	Eva Adara	Maria Menounos
From Russia with Love	Elizabeth Stark	Natasha Bedingfield
Blood Stone	Nicole Hunter	Joss Stone (likeness and voice)
GoldenEye 007	Xenia Onatopp	Kate Magowan (likeness and voice)
GoldenEye 007	Natalya Simonova	Kirsty Mitchell (likeness and voice)
007 Legends	Holly Goodhead	Jane Perry
007 Legends	Tracy Draco	Diana Rigg (likeness), Nicola Walker (voice)
007 Legends	Pam Bouvier	Carey Lowell
007 Legends	Jinx	Gabriela Montaraz (likeness), Madalena Alberto (voice)
007 Legends	Pussy Galore	Honor Blackman (likeness), Natasha Little (voice)
First Light	Isola Vale	Noémie Nakai (likeness and voice)
First Light	Theresa Lorca	Raquel Ciprian (likeness and voice)

== Documentary ==
In 2002, former Bond girl Maryam d'Abo co-wrote the book Bond Girls Are Forever: The Women of James Bond. This book later became a DVD exclusive documentary featuring d'Abo and other Bond girls, including Ursula Andress. In some locations, the documentary was released as a gift with the purchase of Die Another Day on DVD. The featurette was included on the DVD release of Casino Royale (2006).

== See also ==
- List of female action heroes and villains

== Works cited ==
- Comentale, Edward P; Watt, Stephen; Willman, Skip (2005). Ian Fleming & James Bond: the cultural politics of 007. Indiana University Press. ISBN 978-0-253-21743-1.
- Jütting, Kerstin (2007). "Grow Up, 007!": James Bond Over the Decades: Formula Vs. Innovation. GRIN Verlag. ISBN 978-3-638-85372-9.
- Lipp, Deborah (2006). The Ultimate James Bond Fan Book. New York: Sterling & Ross Publishers. ISBN 978-0-9766372-8-8.
