= James Bond (literary character) =

Fictional spy

- James Bond character
- Ian Fleming's image of James Bond; commissioned to aid the Daily Express comic strip artists.
- First appearance: Casino Royale (1953)
- Created by: Ian Fleming

In-universe information
- Alias: 007
- Gender: Male
- Title: Commander (Royal Naval Reserve)
- Occupation: Intelligence agent
- Family: Andrew Bond (father); Monique Delacroix Bond (mother)
- Spouse: Teresa di Vicenzo (widowed)
- Significant other: Kissy Suzuki
- Children: James Suzuki
- Relatives: Charmian Bond (aunt); Max Bond (uncle); James Bond Jr. (nephew)
- Nationality: British

James Bond is a character created by the British journalist and novelist Ian Fleming in 1953. He is the protagonist of the James Bond series of novels, films, comics and video games. Fleming wrote twelve Bond novels and two short story collections. His final two books—The Man with the Golden Gun (1965) and Octopussy and The Living Daylights (1966)—were published posthumously.

The character is a Secret Service officer, code number 007 (pronounced "double-O[/oʊ/]-seven"), residing in London but active internationally. Bond was a composite character who was based on a number of commandos whom Fleming knew during his service in the Naval Intelligence Division during the Second World War, to whom Fleming added his own style and a number of his own tastes. Bond's name may have been appropriated from the American ornithologist of the same name, although it is possible that Fleming took the name from a Welsh agent with whom he served, James C. Bond. Bond has a number of consistent character traits which run throughout the books, including a love of cars, food, drink and sex, and an average intake of sixty custom-made cigarettes a day.

Since Fleming's death in 1964, there have been other authorised writers of Bond material, including John Gardner, who wrote fourteen novels and two novelizations; Raymond Benson, who wrote six novels, three novelizations and three short stories; and Anthony Horowitz, who has written three novels. There have also been other authors who wrote one book each: Kingsley Amis (under the pseudonym Robert Markham), Sebastian Faulks, Jeffery Deaver and William Boyd. Additionally, a series of novels based on Bond's youth—Young Bond—was written by Charlie Higson and later Stephen Cole.

As a spin-off from the original literary work, Casino Royale, a television adaptation was made, "Casino Royale", in which Bond (Barry Nelson) was depicted as an American agent. A comic strip series also ran in the Daily Express newspaper. There have been twenty-seven Bond films; seven actors have played Bond in the films.

== Background and inspiration ==
The central figure in Ian Fleming's work is the fictional character of James Bond, an intelligence officer in the "Secret Service". Bond is also known by his code number, 007, and was a Royal Naval Reserve Commander.

James Bond is the culmination of an important but much-maligned tradition in English literature. As a boy, Fleming devoured the Bulldog Drummond tales of Lieutenant Colonel Herman Cyril McNeile (aka "Sapper") and the Richard Hannay stories of John Buchan. His genius was to repackage these antiquated adventures to fit the fashion of postwar Britain ... In Bond, he created a Bulldog Drummond for the jet age.

— William Cook in the New Statesman

During the Second World War, Ian Fleming had mentioned to friends that he wanted to write a spy novel. It was not until 1952, however, shortly before his wedding to his pregnant girlfriend, Ann Charteris, that Fleming began to write his first book, Casino Royale, to distract himself from his forthcoming nuptials. Fleming started writing the novel at his Goldeneye estate in Oracabessa, Jamaica on 17 February 1952, typing out 2,000 words in the morning, directly from his own experiences and imagination. He finished work on the manuscript in just over a month, completing it on 18 March 1952. Describing the work as his "dreadful oafish opus", Fleming showed it to an ex-girlfriend, Clare Blanchard, who advised him not to publish it at all, but that if he did so, it should be under another name. Despite that advice, Fleming went on to write a total of twelve Bond novels and two short story collections before his death on 12 August 1964. The last two books—The Man with the Golden Gun and Octopussy and The Living Daylights—were published posthumously.

=== Inspiration for the character ===
Fleming based his creation on a number of individuals which he came across during his time in the Naval Intelligence Division during the Second World War, admitting that Bond "was a compound of all the secret agents and commando types I met during the war". Among those types were his brother, Peter, whom Fleming worshipped and who had been involved in behind-the-lines operations in Norway and Greece during the war.

Aside from Fleming's brother, a number of others also provided some aspects of Bond's make up, including Conrad O'Brien-ffrench, a skiing spy whom Fleming had met in Kitzbühel in the 1930s, Patrick Dalzel-Job, who served with distinction in 30 AU during the war, and Bill "Biffy" Dunderdale, station head of MI6 in Paris, who wore cuff-links and handmade suits and was chauffeured around Paris in a Rolls-Royce. Sir Fitzroy Maclean was another figure mentioned as a possibility, based on his wartime work behind enemy lines in the Balkans, as was the MI6 double agent Dušan Popov.

In 2016, a BBC Radio 4 documentary explored the possibility that the character of Bond was inspired by author and mentor to Fleming, Phyllis Bottome in her 1946 novel, The Lifeline. Distinct similarities between the protagonist in The Lifeline, Mark Chalmers, and Bond have been highlighted by spy writer Nigel West.

=== Origins of the name ===
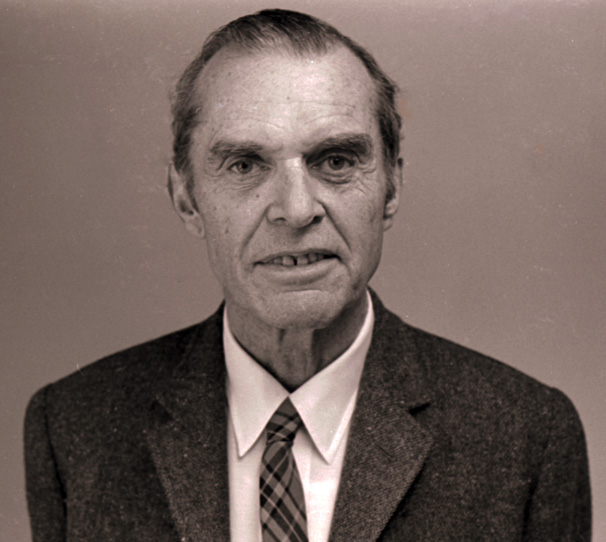
James Bond, ornithologist; the accepted provider of Bond's name

Fleming took the name for his character from that of the American ornithologist Dr James Bond, an expert on Caribbean birds based at the Academy of Natural Sciences of Philadelphia and author of the definitive field guide Birds of the West Indies, first published in 1936. Fleming, a keen birdwatcher himself, had a copy of Bond's guide and he later explained to the ornithologist's wife that "It struck me that this brief, unromantic, Anglo-Saxon and yet very masculine name was just what I needed, and so a second James Bond was born".

When I wrote the first one in 1953, I wanted Bond to be an extremely dull, uninteresting man to whom things happened; I wanted him to be a blunt instrument ... when I was casting around for a name for my protagonist I thought by God, [James Bond] is the dullest name I ever heard. — Ian Fleming, The New Yorker, 21 April 1962

On another occasion Fleming said: "I wanted the simplest, dullest, plainest-sounding name I could find, 'James Bond' was much better than something more interesting, like 'Peregrine Carruthers'. Exotic things would happen to and around him, but he would be a neutral figure—an anonymous, blunt instrument wielded by a government department." After Fleming met the ornithologist and his wife, he described them as "a charming couple who are amused by the whole joke". In the first draft of Casino Royale he decided to use the name James Secretan as Bond's cover name while on missions.

In 2018 the family of James Charles Bond, who had served under Fleming as a member of the Special Operations Executive, claimed that the name could have been linked with him.

Bond's code number—007—was assigned by Fleming in reference to one of British naval intelligence's key achievements of First World War: the breaking of the German diplomatic code. One of the German documents cracked and read by the British was the Zimmermann Telegram, which was coded 0075, and which was one of the factors that led to the US entering the war.

== Characterisation ==
=== Appearance ===
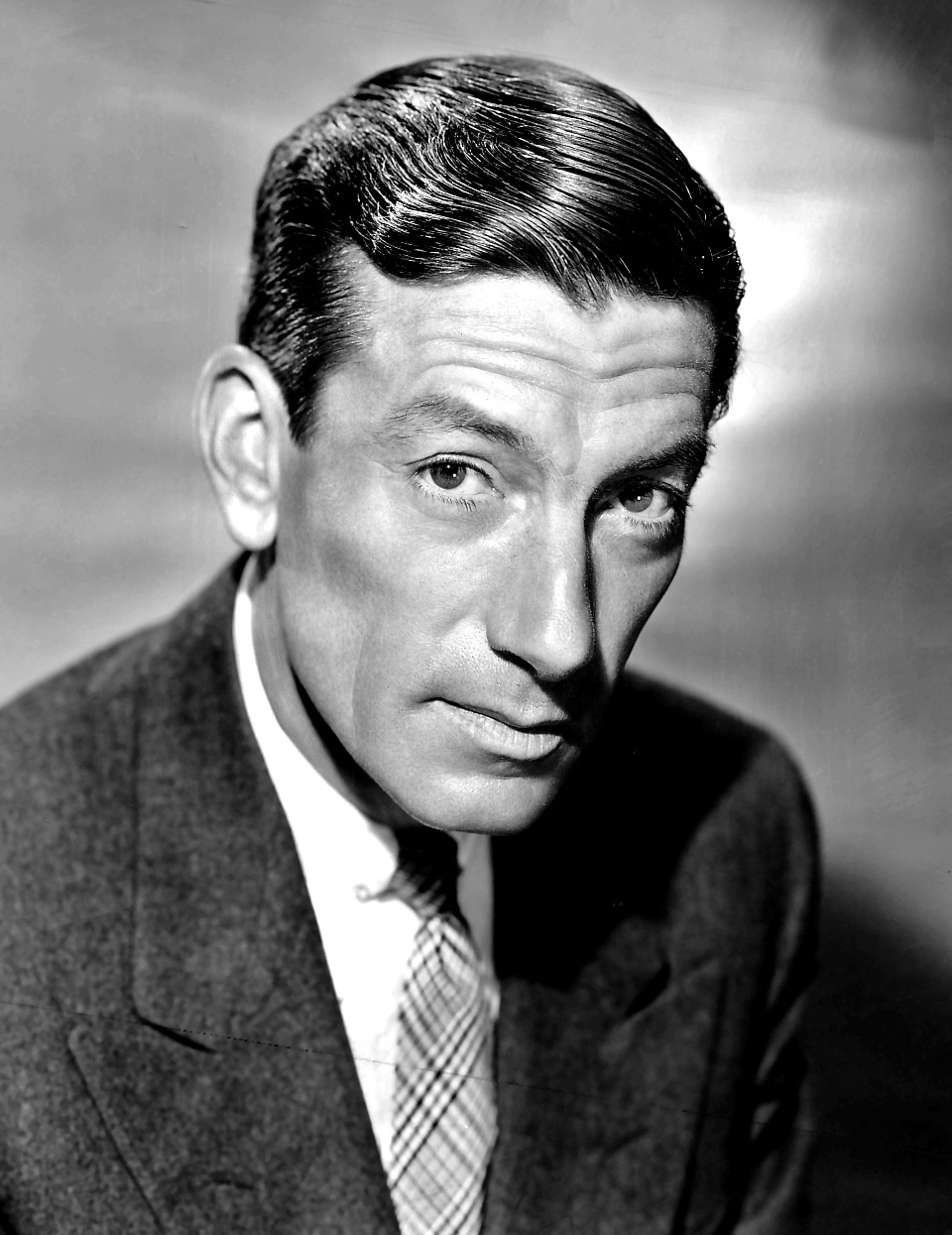
Fleming compared Bond's appearance to Hoagy Carmichael.

Facially, Bond resembles the composer, singer and actor Hoagy Carmichael. In Casino Royale, Vesper Lynd remarks, "Bond reminds me rather of Hoagy Carmichael, but there is something cold and ruthless." Likewise, in Moonraker, Special Branch Officer Gala Brand thinks that Bond is "certainly good-looking ... Rather like Hoagy Carmichael in a way. That black hair falling down over the right eyebrow. Much the same bones. But there was something a bit cruel in the mouth, and the eyes were cold." Others, such as journalist Ben Macintyre, identify aspects of Fleming's own looks in his description of Bond. General references in the novels describe Bond as having "dark, rather cruel good looks".

In the novels (notably From Russia, with Love), Bond's physical description has generally been consistent: slim build; a 3 in (76 mm) long, thin vertical scar on his right cheek; blue-grey eyes; a "cruel" mouth; short, black hair, a comma of which rests on his forehead. Physically he is described as 1.83 m (6 ft 0 in) in height and 76 kg (168 lb) in weight. During Casino Royale, a SMERSH agent carves the Russian Cyrillic letter "Ш" (SH) (for Shpion: "Spy") into the back of Bond's right hand; by the start of Live and Let Die, Bond has had a skin graft to hide the scars.

=== Background ===
==== Early life ====
In Fleming's stories, Bond is in his mid-to-late thirties, but does not age. In Moonraker, he admits to being eight years shy of mandatory retirement age from the 00 section—45—which would mean he was 37 at the time. Fleming did not provide Bond's date of birth, but John Pearson's fictional biography of Bond, James Bond: The Authorized Biography of 007, gives him a birth date of 11 November 1920, while a study by Bond scholar John Griswold puts the date at 11 November 1921. According to Griswold, the Fleming novels take place between around May 1951, to February 1964, by which time Bond was aged 42.

If the quality of these books, or their degree of veracity, had been any higher, the author would certainly have been prosecuted under the Official Secrets Act. It is a measure of the disdain in which these fictions are held at the Ministry, that action has not yet—I emphasize the qualification—been taken against the author and publisher of these high-flown and romanticized caricatures of episodes in the career of an outstanding public servant.

— You Only Live Twice, Chapter 21: Obit:

Coat of arms of the Bond family

Fleming wrote On Her Majesty's Secret Service while Dr. No was being filmed in Jamaica and was influenced by the casting of Scottish actor Sean Connery to give Bond Scottish ancestry. It was not until the penultimate novel, You Only Live Twice, that Fleming gave Bond a more complete sense of family background, using a fictional obituary, purportedly from The Times. The novel reveals Bond's parents were Andrew Bond, of Glencoe, and Monique Delacroix, of the Canton de Vaud. The book was the first to be written after the release of Dr. No in cinemas and Connery's depiction of Bond affected Fleming's interpretation of the character, to give Bond a sense of humour that was not present in the previous stories. Bond spends much of his early life abroad, becoming multilingual in German and French because of his father's work as a Vickers armaments company representative. Bond is orphaned at age 11 after his parents are killed in a mountain climbing accident in the Aiguilles Rouges near Chamonix.

After the death of his parents, Bond went to live with his aunt, Miss Charmian Bond, in the village of Pett Bottom, where he completed his early education. Later, he briefly attended Eton College at "12 or thereabouts", but was expelled after two halves because of girl trouble with a maid. After being sent down from Eton, Bond was sent to Fettes College in Scotland, his father's school. On his first visit to Paris at the age of 16, Bond lost his virginity, later reminiscing about the event in "From a View to a Kill". Fleming referenced his own upbringing for his creation, with Bond alluding to briefly attending the University of Geneva (as did Fleming), before being taught to ski in Kitzbühel (as was Fleming) by Hannes Oberhauser, who is later killed in "Octopussy".

Bond joined the Secret Service in 1938–as described by a Russian dossier about him in From Russia, with Love. He spent two months in 1939 at the Monte Carlo Casino watching a Romanian group cheating before he and the Deuxième Bureau closed them down. Bond's obituary in You Only Live Twice states that, in 1941, he joined "a branch of what was subsequently to become the Ministry of Defence", where he rose to the rank of principal officer. The same year he became a lieutenant in the Royal Naval Volunteer Reserve, ending the war as a commander.

At the start of Fleming's first book, Casino Royale, Bond is already a 00 agent, having been given the position after killing two enemy agents, a Japanese spy on the thirty-sixth floor of the RCA Building at Rockefeller Center (then housing the headquarters of British Security Co-ordination – BSC) in New York City and a Norwegian double agent who had betrayed two British agents; it is suggested by Bond scholar John Griswold that these were part of Bond's wartime service with Special Operations Executive, a British Second World War covert military organisation. Bond is made a Companion of the Order of St Michael and St George in either 1953–as described by a Russian dossier about Bond in From Russia, with Love—or 1954, as described by Bond's obituary in You Only Live Twice.

=== Personal life ===
Bond lives in a flat off the King's Road in Chelsea. Continuation authors John Pearson and William Boyd both identify the location as Wellington Square. The former believed the address was No. 30, and the latter No. 25. His flat is looked after by an elderly Scottish housekeeper named May Maxwell. May's name was taken from May Maxwell, the housekeeper of Fleming's close friend, the American Ivar Bryce. In 1955, Bond earned around £2,000 a year net (equivalent to £45,000 in 2025), although, when on assignment, he worked on an unlimited expense account. Much of Fleming's own daily routine while working at The Sunday Times was woven into the Bond stories, and he summarised it at the beginning of Moonraker:

... elastic office hours from around ten to six; lunch, generally in the canteen; evenings spent playing cards in the company of a few close friends, or at Crockford's; or making love, with rather cold passion, to one of three similarly disposed married women; weekends playing golf for high stakes at one of the clubs near London.

— Moonraker, Chapter 1: Secret paper-work

Only once in the series does Fleming have a partner for Bond in his flat, with the arrival of Tiffany Case, following Bond's mission to the US in Diamonds Are Forever. By the start of the following book, From Russia, With Love, Case has left to marry an American. Bond is married only once, in On Her Majesty's Secret Service, to Teresa "Tracy" di Vicenzo, but their marriage ends tragically when she is killed on their wedding day by Bond's nemesis Ernst Stavro Blofeld.

In the penultimate novel of the series, You Only Live Twice, Bond suffers from amnesia and has a relationship with an Ama diving girl, Kissy Suzuki. As a result of the relationship, Kissy becomes pregnant, although she does not reveal this to Bond before he leaves the island.

=== Tastes and style ===
==== Drinks ====
Fleming biographer Andrew Lycett noted that, "within the first few pages [of Casino Royale] Ian had introduced most of Bond's idiosyncrasies and trademarks", which included his looks, his Bentley and his smoking and drinking habits. The full details of Bond's martini were kept until chapter seven of the book and Bond eventually named it "The Vesper", after his love interest Vesper Lynd.

'A dry martini,' he said. 'One. In a deep champagne goblet.'

'Oui, monsieur.'

'Just a moment. Three measures of Gordon's, one of vodka, half a measure of Kina Lillet. Shake it very well until it's ice-cold, then add a large thin slice of lemon peel. Got it?'

'Certainly monsieur.' The barman seemed pleased with the idea.

'Gosh, that's certainly a drink,' said Leiter.

Bond laughed. 'When I'm ... er ... concentrating,' he explained, 'I never have more than one drink before dinner. But I do like that one to be large and very strong and very cold, and very well-made. I hate small portions of anything, particularly when they taste bad. This drink's my own invention. I'm going to patent it when I think of a good name.'

— Casino Royale, Chapter 7: Rouge et Noir

Bond's drinking habits run throughout the series of books. During the course of On Her Majesty's Secret Service alone, Bond consumes forty-six drinks: Pouilly-Fuissé, Riquewihr and Marsala wines, most of a bottle of Algerian wine, some 1953 Château Mouton Rothschild claret, along with Taittinger and Krug champagnes and Babycham; for whiskies, he consumes three bourbon and waters, half a pint of I.W. Harper bourbon, Jack Daniel's whiskey, two double bourbons on the rocks, two whisky and sodas, two neat scotches and one glass of neat whisky; vodka consumption totalled four vodka and tonics and three double vodka martinis; other spirits included two double brandies with ginger ale, a flask of Enzian schnapps and a double gin: he also washes this down with four steins of German beer. Bond's alcohol intake does not seem to affect his performance.

Regarding non-alcoholic drinks, Bond eschews tea, calling it "mud" and blaming it for the downfall of the British Empire. He instead prefers to drink strong coffee, typically brewed in a Chemex Coffeemaker.

==== Food ====
When in England and not on a mission, Bond dines as simply as Fleming did on dishes such as grilled sole, oeufs en cocotte and cold roast beef with potato salad. When on a mission, however, Bond eats more extravagantly. This was partly because in 1953, when Casino Royale was published, many items of food were still rationed in the UK, and Bond was "the ideal antidote to Britain's postwar austerity, rationing and the looming premonition of lost power". This extravagance was more noteworthy with his contemporary readers for Bond eating exotic, local foods when abroad, at a time when most of his readership did not travel abroad.

On 1 April 1958, Fleming wrote to The Manchester Guardian in defence of his work, referring to that paper's review of Dr. No. While referring to Bond's food and wine consumption as "gimmickery", Fleming bemoaned that "it has become an unfortunate trade-mark. I myself abhor Wine-and-Foodmanship. My own favourite food is scrambled eggs." Fleming was so keen on scrambled eggs that he used his short story, "007 in New York", to provide his favourite recipe for the dish: in the story, this came from the housekeeper of Fleming's friend Ivar Bryce, May, who gave her name to Bond's own housekeeper. Academic Edward Biddulph observed that Fleming fully described seventy meals within the book series and that while a number of these had items in common—such as scrambled eggs and steaks—each meal was different from the others.

==== Smoking ====
Bond is a heavy smoker, at one point smoking 70 cigarettes a day. Bond has his cigarettes custom-made by Morland of Grosvenor Street, mixing Balkan and Turkish tobacco and having a higher nicotine content than normal; the cigarettes have three gold bands on the filter. Bond carried his cigarettes in a wide gunmetal cigarette case which carried fifty; he also used a black oxidised Ronson lighter. The cigarettes were the same as Fleming's, who had been buying his at Morland since the 1930s; the three gold bands on the filter were added during the war to mirror his naval Commander's rank. On average, Bond smokes sixty cigarettes a day, although he cut back to around twenty-five a day after his visit to a health farm in Thunderball: Fleming himself smoked up to 80 cigarettes a day.

==== Drugs ====
Bond occasionally supplements his alcohol consumption with the use of other drugs, for both functional and recreational reasons: Moonraker sees Bond consume a quantity of the amphetamine benzedrine accompanied by champagne, before his bridge game with Sir Hugo Drax (also consuming a carafe of vintage Riga vodka and a vodka martini); he also uses the drug for stimulation on missions, such as swimming across Shark Bay in Live and Let Die, or remaining awake and alert when threatened in the Dreamy Pines Motor Court in The Spy Who Loved Me.

==== Cars ====
Bond was a car enthusiast and took great interest in his vehicles. In Moonraker, Fleming writes that "Bond had once dabbled on the fringe of the racing world", implying Bond had raced in the past. Over the course of the 14 books, Bond owns three cars, all Bentleys. For the first three books of the series, Bond drives a supercharged 1930 Bentley 4½ Litre, painted battleship grey, that he bought in 1933. During the War he kept the car in storage. He wrecks this car in May 1954 during the events of Moonraker.

Bond subsequently purchases a Bentley Mark VI drophead coupé, using the money he won from Hugo Drax at Blades. This car is also painted battleship grey and has dark blue upholstery. Fleming refers to this car as a 1953 model, even though the last year for the mark was 1952. It is possible the 1953 year refers to the coachwork, which in this case would probably make it a Graber-bodied car.

In Thunderball, Bond buys the wreck of a Bentley R-Type Continental with a sports saloon body and 4.5 L engine. Produced between 1952 and 1955, Bentley built 208 of these cars, 193 of which had H. J. Mulliner bodies. Bond's car would have been built before July 1954, as the engines fitted after this time were 4.9 L. Fleming curiously calls this car a "Mark II", a term which was never used. Bond replaces the engine with a Mark IV 4.9 L and commissions a body from Mulliners that was a "rather square convertible two-seater affair." He paints this car battleship grey and upholsters it in black. Later, against the advice of Bentley, he adds an Arnott supercharger. In 1957, Fleming had written to Rolls-Royce's Chairman, Whitney Straight, to get information about a new car for Bond. Fleming wanted the car to be a cross between a Bentley Continental and a Ford Thunderbird. Straight pointed Fleming to chassis number BC63LC, which was probably the inspiration for the vehicle that ended up in the book. This car had been delivered in May 1954 to a Mr Silva as a Mulliner-bodied coupé. After he rolled the car and wrecked the body, Silva commissioned Mulliner to convert it to a drophead. However, Mulliner's price was too high and Silva eventually had the body built by Henri Chapron, with the work completed in July 1958. In 2008, the coachwork on this car was modified to match the proposed Mulliner conversion more closely.

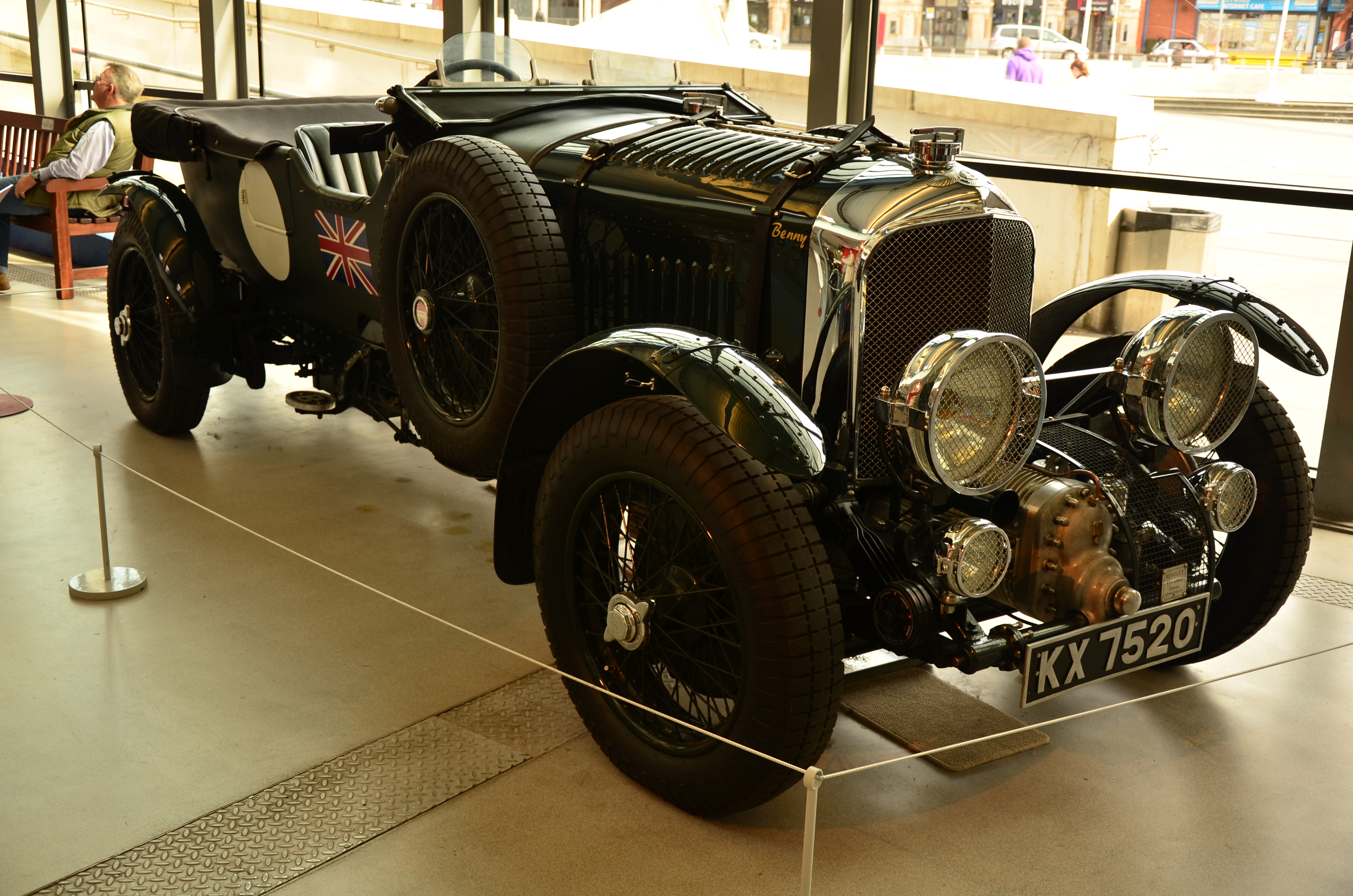
1930 4.5 Litre Blower Bentley

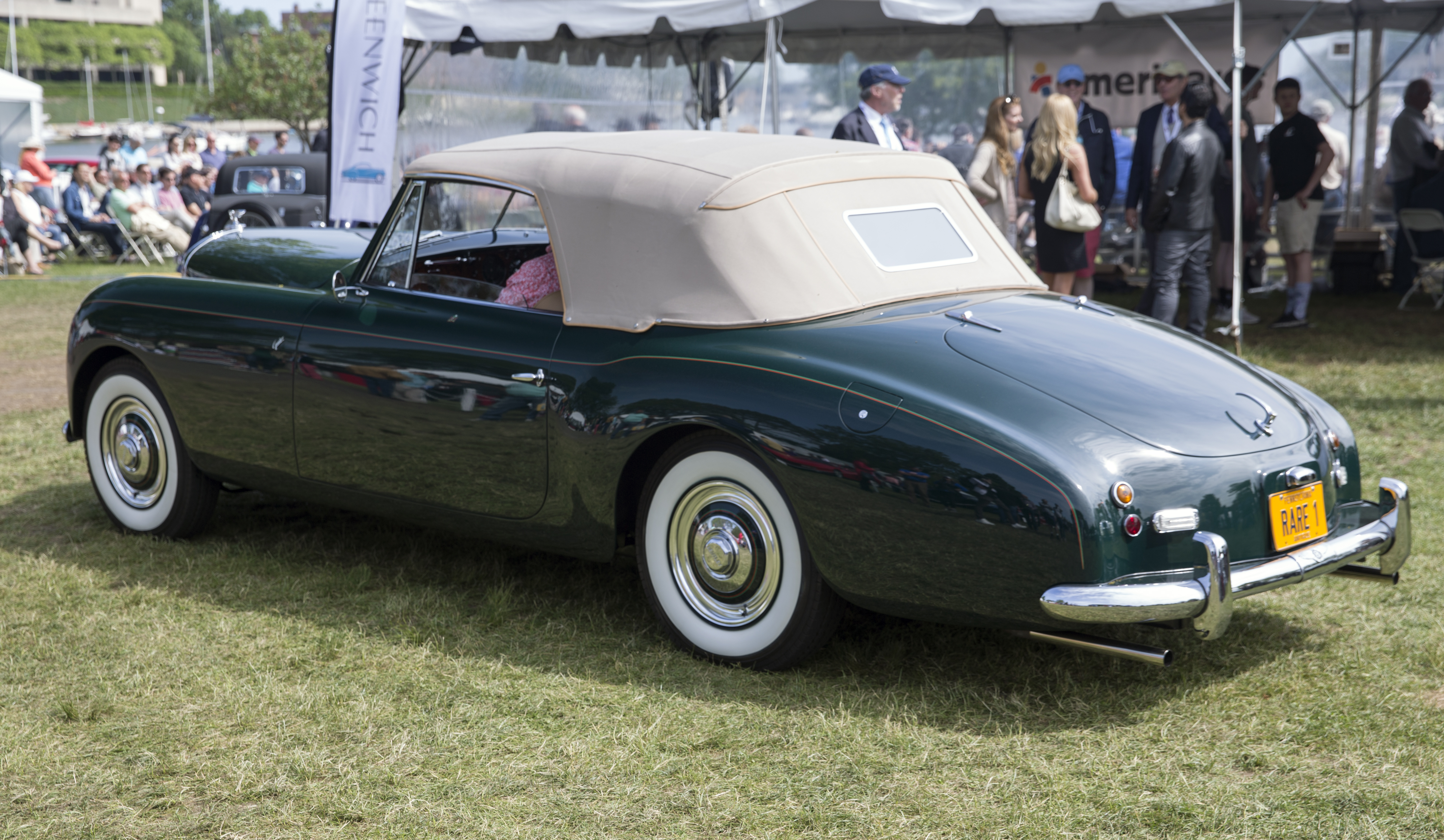
1951 Bentley Mark VI with 1953 Graber body

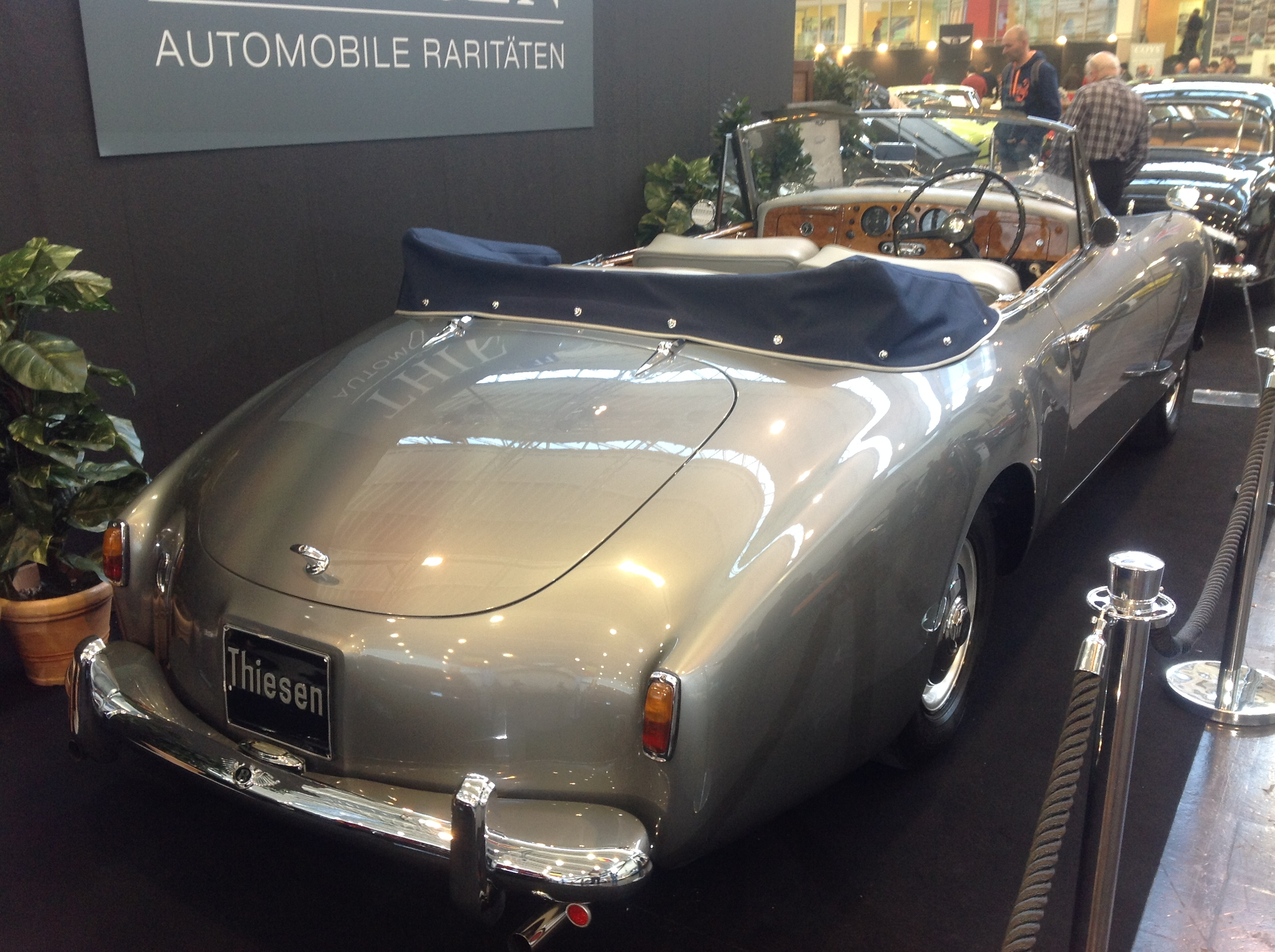
Bentley R-Type Continental

=== Attitudes ===
According to academic Jeremy Black, Bond is written as a complex character, even though he was also often the voice of Fleming's prejudices. Throughout Fleming's books, Bond expresses racist, sexist and homophobic attitudes. The output of these prejudices, combined with the tales of Bond's actions, led journalist Yuri Zhukov to write an article in 1965 for the Soviet daily newspaper Pravda, describing Bond's values:

James Bond lives in a nightmarish world where laws are written at the point of a gun, where coercion and rape are considered valour and murder is a funny trick ... Bond's job is to guard the interests of the property class, and he is no better than the youths Hitler boasted he would bring up like wild beasts to be able to kill without thinking.

— Yuri Zhukov, Pravda, 30 September 1965.

Black does not consider Bond to be the unthinking wild beast Zhukov writes about, however. In From Russia, with Love, Bond watches Kerim Bey shoot the Bulgarian killer Krilencu and Bond observes that he had never killed anyone in cold blood. In "The Living Daylights", Bond deliberately misses his target, realising the sniper, codenamed Trigger, that he has been sent to kill is not a professional, but simply a beautiful female cello player. Bond settles this in his mind by thinking that "It wasn't exactly murder. Pretty near it, though." Goldfinger opens with Bond thinking through the experience of killing a Mexican assassin days earlier. He is philosophical about it:

It was part of his profession to kill people. He had never liked doing it and when he had to kill he did it as well as he knew how and forgot about it. As a secret agent who held the rare double-O prefix—the licence to kill in the Secret Service—it was his duty to be as cool about death as a surgeon. If it happened, it happened. Regret was unprofessional—worse, it was a death-watch beetle in the soul.

— Goldfinger, Chapter 1: Reflections in a Double Bourbon

In response to a reviewer's criticism of Bond as villainous, Fleming said in a 1964 Playboy interview that he did not consider his character to be particularly evil or good: "I don't think that he is necessarily a good guy or a bad guy. Who is? He's got his vices and very few perceptible virtues except patriotism and courage, which are probably not virtues anyway ... But I didn't intend for him to be a particularly likeable person." Fleming agreed with some critics' characterisation of Bond as an unthinking killer, but expressed that he was a product of his time: "James Bond is a healthy, violent, noncerebral man in his middle-thirties, and a creature of his era. I wouldn't say he's particularly typical of our times, but he's certainly of the times."

Another general attitude and prejudice of Fleming's that Bond gives voice to includes his approach to homosexuality. While Fleming had a number of gay friends, including Noël Coward and his editor, William Plomer, he said that his books were "written for warm-blooded heterosexuals". His attitude went further, with Bond opining that homosexuals were "a herd of unhappy sexual misfits—barren and full of frustrations, the women wanting to dominate and the men to be nannied", adding that "he was sorry for them, but he had no time for them."

=== Abilities ===
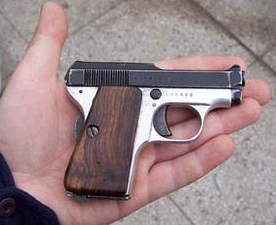
An easily concealed Beretta 418 pistol that was Bond's original choice of sidearm

From Casino Royale to From Russia, with Love Bond's preferred weapon is a .25 ACP Beretta automatic pistol carried in a light-weight chamois leather holster. However, Fleming was contacted by a Bond enthusiast and gun expert, Geoffrey Boothroyd, who criticised Fleming's choice of firearm for Bond and suggested a Walther PPK 7.65mm instead. Fleming used the suggestion in Dr. No, also taking advice that it should be used with the Berns-Martin triple draw shoulder holster. By way of thanks, the Secret Service Armourer who gives Bond his gun was given the name Major Boothroyd, and is introduced by M, Chief of the Secret Intelligence Service, as "the greatest small-arms expert in the world".

I wish to point out that a man in James Bond's position would never consider using a .25 Beretta. It's really a lady's gun—and not a very nice lady at that! Dare I suggest that Bond should be armed with a .38 or a nine millimetre—let's say a German Walther PPK? That's far more appropriate.

— Geoffrey Boothroyd, letter to Ian Fleming, 1956

Kingsley Amis, in The James Bond Dossier, noted that although Bond is a very good shot and the best in the Secret Service, he is still beaten by the instructor, something that added realism to Bond's character. Amis identified a number of skills where Bond is very good, but is still beatable by others. These included skiing, hand-to-hand combat (elaborated in the SMERSH dossier on Bond in From Russia, With Love as proficiency in boxing with a good practical knowledge of judo holds), underwater swimming and golf. Driving was also an ability Amis identified where Bond was good, but others were better; one of those who is a better driver than Bond is Sir Hugo Drax, who causes Bond to write off his battleship-grey supercharged Bentley 4½ Litre. Bond subsequently drives a Mark II Continental Bentley, which he uses in the remaining books of the series, although he is issued an Aston Martin DB Mark III with a homing device during the course of Goldfinger.

== Continuation Bond works ==
=== Kingsley Amis ===
In 1967, four years after Fleming's death, his literary executors, Glidrose Productions, approached Kingsley Amis and offered him £10,000 (£159,341 in 2025 pounds) to write the first continuation Bond novel. The result was Colonel Sun published in 1968 under the pen-name Robert Markham. Journalist James Harker noted that although the book was not literary, it was stylish. Raymond Benson noted that Bond's character and events from previous novels were all maintained in Colonel Sun, saying "he is the same darkly handsome man first introduced in Casino Royale".

=== John Gardner ===
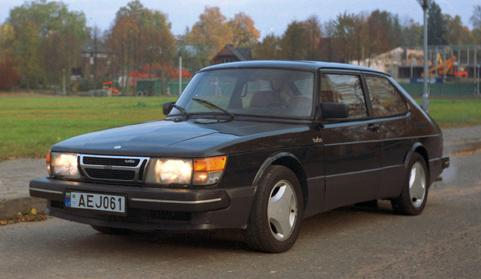
The Saab 900 Turbo: Bond's car of the 1980s

In 1981, writer John Gardner was approached by the Fleming estate and asked to write a continuation novel for Bond. Although he initially almost turned the series down, Gardner subsequently wrote 14 original novels and two novelizations of the films between Licence Renewed in 1981 and COLD in 1996. With the influence of the American publishers, Putnam's, the Gardner novels showed an increase in the number of Americanisms used in the book, such as a waiter wearing "pants", rather than trousers, in The Man from Barbarossa. James Harker, writing in The Guardian, considered that the Gardner books were "dogged by silliness", giving examples of Scorpius, where much of the action is set in Chippenham, and Win, Lose or Die, where "Bond gets chummy with an unconvincing Maggie Thatcher". Ill health forced Gardner to retire from writing the Bond novels in 1996.

Gardner stated that he wanted "to bring Mr Bond into the 1980s", although he retained the ages of the characters as they were when Fleming had left them. Even though Gardner kept the ages the same, he made Bond grey at the temples as a nod to the passing of the years. Other 1980s effects also took place, with Bond smoking low-tar cigarettes and becoming increasingly health conscious.

The return of Bond in 1981 saw media reports on the more politically correct Bond and his choice of car—a Saab 900 Turbo; Gardner later put him in a Bentley Mulsanne Turbo. Gardner also updated Bond's firearm: under Gardner, Bond is initially issued with the Browning 9mm before changing to a Heckler & Koch VP70 and then a Heckler & Koch P7. Bond is also revealed to have taken part in the 1982 Falklands War. Gardner updated Fleming's characters and used contemporary political leaders in his novels; he also used the high-tech apparatus of Q Branch from the films, although Jeremy Black observed that Bond is more reliant on technology than his own individual abilities. Gardner's series linked Bond to the Fleming novels rather than the film incarnations and referred to events covered in the Fleming stories.

=== Raymond Benson ===
Following the retirement of John Gardner, Raymond Benson took over as Bond author in 1996; as the first American author of Bond it was a controversial choice. Benson had previously written the non-fiction The James Bond Bedside Companion, first published in 1984. Benson's first work was a short story, "Blast from the Past", published in 1997. By the time he moved on to other projects in 2002, Benson had written six Bond novels, three novelizations and three short stories. His final Bond work was The Man with the Red Tattoo, published in 2002.

In Bond novels and their ilk, the plot must threaten not only our hero but civilization as we know it. The icing on the cake is using exotic locales that "normal people" only fantasize about visiting, and slipping in essential dollops of sex and violence to build interest.

— Raymond Benson

Benson followed Gardner's pattern of setting Bond in the contemporary timeframe of the 1990s and, according to Jeremy Black, had more echoes of Fleming's style than John Gardner, he also changed Bond's gun back to the Walther PPK, put him behind the wheel of a Jaguar XK8 and made him swear more. James Harker noted that "whilst Fleming's Bond had been an Express reader; Benson's is positively red top. He's the first to have group sex ... and the first to visit a prostitute", whilst Black notes an increased level of crudity lacking in either Fleming or Gardner. In a 1998 interview Benson described his version of Bond as a more ruthless and darker character, stating that "Bond is not a nice guy. Bond is a killer ... He is an anti-hero."

=== Others ===
==== Sebastian Faulks ====
After Gardner and Benson had followed Amis, there was a gap of six years until Sebastian Faulks was commissioned by Ian Fleming Publications to write a new Bond novel, which was released on 28 May 2008, the one hundredth anniversary of Ian Fleming's birth. The book—entitled Devil May Care—was published in the UK by Penguin Books and by Doubleday in the US.

Faulks ignored the timeframe established by Gardner and Benson and instead reverted to that used by Fleming and Amis, basing his novel in the 1960s; he also managed to use a number of the cultural touchstones of the sixties in the book. Faulks was true to Bond's original character and background too, and provided "a Flemingesque hero" who drove a battleship grey 1967 T-series Bentley.

==== Jeffery Deaver ====
On 26 May 2011 American writer Jeffery Deaver, commissioned by Ian Fleming Publications, released Carte Blanche. Deaver restarted the chronology of Bond, separate from the timelines of any of the previous authors, by stating he was born in 1980; the novel also saw Bond in a post-9/11 agency, independent of either MI5 or MI6.

The films didn't influence me at all and nor did the continuation novels. I wanted to get back to the original Bond who's dark and edgy, has quite a sense of irony and humour and is extremely patriotic and willing to sacrifice himself for Queen and country. He is extremely loyal but he has this dark pall over him because he's a hired killer – and he wrestles with that. I've always found him to be quite a representative of the modern era.

— Jeffery Deaver

Whilst the chronology changed, Deaver included a number of elements from the Fleming novels, including Bond's tastes for food and wine, his gadgets and "the rather preposterous names of some of the female characters".

==== William Boyd ====
In 2013 William Boyd's continuation novel, Solo, was released; it ignored Deaver's new timeframe and was set in 1969.

==== Anthony Horowitz ====
In September 2015 the author Anthony Horowitz released Trigger Mortis; a novel containing material written, but previously unreleased, by Fleming. It is set in 1957, two weeks after the events of Fleming's novel Goldfinger.

In May 2018 Horowitz released Forever and a Day; again containing unreleased material from Fleming. It is set in 1950, before the events of Casino Royale, and thoroughly details the events leading up to Bond's promotion to 00-status, and becoming the character he is by the original Fleming novel.

Horowitz released a third Bond novel, With a Mind to Kill, in 2022. This novel is set after the events of The Man with the Golden Gun and features MI6 sending Bond back to Russia to infiltrate the same group that brainwashed him to try and kill M, planting fake evidence that Bond succeeded in his mission. Bond is able to eliminate Colonel Boris, the head of the group and thwart a planned assassination, but the novel ends with him deciding to leave the service as he has grown jaded with his own role in the work, to the extent that he is in a position where he could be the target of a sniper and he expresses no concern about his fate.

== Young Bond ==
In 2005, the author and comedian Charlie Higson released SilverFin, the first of five novels and one short story in the life of a young James Bond; his final work was the short story "A Hard Man to Kill", released as part of the companion volume Danger Society: The Young Bond Dossier, the companion book to the Young Bond series. Young Bond is set in the 1930s, which would fit the chronology with that of Fleming.

I deliberately steered clear of anything post-Fleming. My books are designed to fit in with what Fleming wrote and nothing else. I also didn't want to be influenced by any of the other books ... for now my Bible is Fleming.

— Charlie Higson

Higson stated that he was instructed by the Fleming estate to ignore all other interpretations of Bond, except the original Fleming version. As the background to Bond's childhood, Higson used Bond's obituary in You Only Live Twice as well as his own and Fleming's childhoods. In forming the early Bond character, Higson created the origins of some of Bond's character traits, including his love of cars and fine wine.

Steve Cole continued the Young Bond storyline with four more novels. Higson went on to write an adult Bond novel, On His Majesty's Secret Service.

== Adaptations ==
John McLusky's rendition of James Bond.

Adaptations of Bond started early in Fleming's writings, with CBS paying him $1,000 ($12,000 in 2025 dollars) to adapt his first novel, Casino Royale, into a one-hour television adventure; this was broadcast on 21 October 1954. The Bond character, played by Barry Nelson, was changed to "Card Sense" Jimmy Bond, an American agent working for "Combined Intelligence".

In 1957 the Daily Express newspaper adapted Fleming's stories into comic strip format. In order to help the artists, Fleming commissioned a sketch to show how he saw Bond; illustrator John McLusky considered Fleming's version too "outdated" and "pre-war" and changed Bond to give him a more masculine look.

In 1962 Eon Productions, the company of Canadian Harry Saltzman and American Albert R. "Cubby" Broccoli released the first cinema adaptation of a Fleming novel, Dr. No, featuring Sean Connery as 007. Connery was the first of seven actors to play Bond on the cinema screen, six of whom appeared in the Eon series of films. As well as looking different, each of the actors has interpreted the role of Bond in a different way. Besides Connery, Bond has been portrayed on film by David Niven, George Lazenby, Roger Moore, Timothy Dalton, Pierce Brosnan and Daniel Craig. On November 16 2026 it was announced that Robert Pattinson would be the 8th actor to portray James Bond on film.

== See also ==
- List of James Bond vehicles
- Outline of James Bond
- List of James Bond novels and short stories
- Bibliography of works on James Bond

== Bibliography ==
- Amis, Kingsley (1966). The James Bond Dossier. London: Pan Books.
- Bennett, Tony; Woollacott, Janet (2003). "The Moments of Bond". In Lindner, Christoph (ed.). The James Bond Phenomenon: a Critical Reader. Manchester: Manchester University Press. ISBN 978-0-7190-6541-5.
- Benson, Raymond (1988). The James Bond Bedside Companion. London: Boxtree Ltd. ISBN 978-1-85283-233-9.
- Black, Jeremy (2005). The Politics of James Bond: from Fleming's Novel to the Big Screen. University of Nebraska Press. ISBN 978-0-8032-6240-9.
- Buckton, Oliver (2021). The World is Not Enough: A Biography of Ian Fleming. Rowman & Littlefield. ISBN 978-1-53-813858-8.
- Britton, Wesley Alan (2004). Spy television (2 ed.). Greenwood Publishing Group. ISBN 978-0-275-98163-1.
- Cabrera Infante, Guillermo (1985). Holy Smoke. New York: Harper & Row. ISBN 978-0-06-015432-5.
- Chancellor, Henry (2005). James Bond: The Man and His World. London: John Murray. ISBN 978-0-7195-6815-2.
- Comentale, Edward P; Watt, Stephen; Willman, Skip (2005). Ian Fleming & James Bond: the cultural politics of 007. Indiana University Press. ISBN 978-0-253-21743-1.
- Cork, John; Stutz, Collin (2007). James Bond Encyclopedia. London: Dorling Kindersley. ISBN 978-1-4053-3427-3.
- Fleming, Ian (2006a). Casino Royale. London: Jonathan Cape. ISBN 978-0-14-102830-9.
- Fleming, Ian (2006b). You Only Live Twice. London: Jonathan Cape. ISBN 978-0-14-102826-2.
- Fleming, Ian (2006c). Moonraker. London: Jonathan Cape. ISBN 978-0-14-102833-0.
- Fleming, Ian (2006d). Goldfinger. London: Jonathan Cape. ISBN 978-0-14-102831-6.
- Fleming, Ian (2006e). Octopussy and The Living Daylights. London: Jonathan Cape. ISBN 978-0-14-102834-7.
- Golson, G. Barry (1983). The Playboy Interview Volume II. London: Perigee Books. ISBN 978-0-399-50769-4.
- Griswold, John (2006). Ian Fleming's James Bond: Annotations And Chronologies for Ian Fleming's Bond Stories. AuthorHouse. ISBN 978-1-4259-3100-1.
- Jütting, Kerstin (2007). "Grow Up, 007!" – James Bond Over the Decades: Formula Vs. Innovation. GRIN Verlag. ISBN 978-3-638-85372-9.
- Lindner, Christoph (2009). The James Bond Phenomenon: a Critical Reader. Manchester University Press. ISBN 978-0-7190-6541-5.
- Lycett, Andrew (1996). Ian Fleming. London: Phoenix. ISBN 978-1-85799-783-5.
- Macintyre, Ben (2008). For Your Eyes Only. London: Bloomsbury Publishing. ISBN 978-0-7475-9527-4.
- Pearson, John (2008). James Bond: The Authorised Biography. Random House. ISBN 978-0-09-950292-0.
- Simpson, Paul (2002). The Rough Guide to James Bond. Rough Guides. ISBN 978-1-84353-142-5.
