= James Bond uncollected short stories =

Uncollected short stories by Ian Fleming

In the 1950s and 1960s, Ian Fleming, creator of the fictional secret agent, James Bond, wrote a number of short stories featuring his creation that appeared in the collections For Your Eyes Only and Octopussy and The Living Daylights. Since 1997, several more short stories featuring Bond or set within the official James Bond universe have been published by authors who continued chronicling the world of Fleming's creation. The majority of these stories have, as of 2008, never been collected in book form, unlike the Fleming works. There are five exceptions: "Blast from the Past", "Midsummer Night's Doom" and "Live at Five" by Raymond Benson, "Your Deal, Mr. Bond" by Phillip and Robert King, and "Bond Strikes Camp" by Cyril Connolly which are discussed below.

== Raymond Benson ==
In the late 1990s, Raymond Benson, who at the time was the official novelist of the James Bond literary franchise, became the first author since Fleming to write officially sanctioned short stories featuring Bond.

Just before his sudden departure from writing Bond novels at the start of 2003, Benson had indicated his intention to write more short pieces and publish a short story collection along the lines of Fleming's For Your Eyes Only and Octopussy and The Living Daylights. As of 2025, however, no such collection has materialised.

As of 2025, these three stories remain the only pieces of James Bond literature that have never officially been published in Great Britain. Additionally, between 2001 and 2002, Benson wrote a fourth short story he planned to title "The Heart of Erzulie", but it was never published.

=== "Blast from the Past" ===
"Blast from the Past" was first published in Playboy in January 1997. In publication order, it follows Cold and precedes Zero Minus Ten.

Benson's first Bond story, "Blast from the Past" is a direct sequel to Fleming's novel You Only Live Twice and appears to exist outside the timeline of either Benson's or John Gardner's other Bond stories.

Bond receives a message, apparently from his son James Suzuki (Suzuki's mother is Kissy Suzuki from You Only Live Twice, now dead from ovarian cancer) asking him to come to New York City on an urgent matter. When Bond arrives, he finds his son murdered, having been poisoned with fugu. With the aid of an SIS agent, Bond learns that Irma Bunt, Ernst Stavro Blofeld's henchwoman, killed James Suzuki as revenge for Blofeld's death (again in You Only Live Twice). Bond ultimately kills Bunt, but his victory is hollow; he must live with having lost his son, and with the knowledge that he was never a real father to him.

The name of Bond's son, James Suzuki, is taken from John Pearson's faux biography, James Bond: The Authorised Biography of 007.

On its original publication, Playboy cut a third of the story for space reasons. The full version was translated for French and Italian magazines, and the original English version was finally published in the 2008 omnibus release The Union Trilogy, along with three of Benson's Bond novels. This made "Blast from the Past" the first non-Fleming Bond short story to be published in book form.

=== "Midsummer Night's Doom" ===
"Midsummer Night's Doom" was first published in Playboy in January 1999. In publication order, it follows The Facts of Death and precedes High Time to Kill.

Playboy founder Hugh Hefner commissioned "Midsummer Night's Doom" to celebrate the magazine's 45th anniversary, with the requirements that it feature Hefner, his Playboy Mansion, and two Playboy Playmates. Benson has described the story as "not ... a real 007 adventure" but rather "a novelty—a whimsical bit of fun to celebrate Playboy's connection with Bond".

In the story, Bond is assigned to attend a party at the Playboy Mansion in Beverly Hills, California, where Ministry of Defence secrets are expected to be sold to a representative of the Russian mafia. While there, Bond meets Hefner, who is aware of his mission and who actually provides Bond with several gadgets à la Q. Bond also has time to enjoy a quick romance with real-life Playmate Lisa Dergan, flirt with other Playmates including Victoria Zdrok, and rub elbows with the likes of actor Robert Culp and singer Mel Tormé.

Dergan thus gained the distinction of being the first real person ever to be awarded the status of Bond girl, though Benson later wrote in a letter to Playboy that Zdrok was also a Bond girl in the story.

The story was included in the 2010 omnibus release Choice of Weapons, along with Benson's three Bond novels not collected in The Union Trilogy.

=== "Live at Five" ===
"Live at Five" was first published in TV Guide's 13–19 November 1999 issue. In publication order, it follows the novelization of The World is Not Enough and precedes Doubleshot.

The story was commissioned by TV Guide for a special James Bond-themed issue (released the week that The World Is Not Enough hit American cinemas) with the directive that it have "something to do with television". It is a brief episode in which Bond, en route to a date with reporter Janet Davies, recalls how he once helped a Russian figure skating champion defect in full view of TV cameras.

Davies, a friend of Benson and at the time a reporter for Chicago's WLS-TV, thus became the third real person to be a Bond girl.

Like "Midsummer Night's Doom", "Live at Five" was reprinted in Choice of Weapons.

=== "The Heart of Erzulie" (unpublished) ===
A fourth short story, titled "The Heart of Erzulie", was written by Raymond Benson in-between Never Dream of Dying and The Man with the Red Tattoo, but it was never published because Ian Fleming Publications felt it was "too much of a Fleming pastiche." Benson himself acknowledges that it was little more than a time-killer in the interim between the two book projects. The story has since been published in Benson's 2015 e-book anthology 12+1--Twelve Short Thrillers and a Play with all references to James Bond removed.

== Samantha Weinberg/Kate Westbrook ==
In 2006, two additional short stories were written and published by Samantha Weinberg under the pseudonym "Kate Westbrook". These stories are part of The Moneypenny Diaries series, an officially licensed spin-off from the Bond novels series focusing on the character of Miss Moneypenny. In September 2020, both stories were republished as a free ebook titled The Moneypenny Diaries: Secret Chapters.

=== "For Your Eyes Only, James" ===
"For Your Eyes Only, James" was first published in Tatler in November 2006. Set in September 1956, the story tells of a weekend Bond and Moneypenny share at Royale-les-Eaux.

=== "Moneypenny's First Date with Bond" ===
"Moneypenny's First Date with Bond" was first published in The Spectator on 11 November 2006. This story, set just after Bond's assignment to the 00 Section and before the events of Casino Royale, tells of Bond and Moneypenny's first meeting.

== Other authorised works ==
=== "A Hard Man to Kill" ===
The Young Bond short story "A Hard Man to Kill", written by Charlie Higson, is included in the companion book Danger Society: The Young Bond Dossier, which was published by Puffin Books on 29 October 2009. As of its publication, it was the longest James Bond short story yet written.

=== "William Boyd Interviews James Bond" ===
"William Boyd Interviews James Bond" was first published in The Guardian on 28 September 2013.

Written to promote the publication of Boyd's Bond novel Solo, the story sees Boyd time-travel back to 1969 to interview James Bond. Boyd walks through 1960s London to Bond's flat, meets his new housekeeper, Donalda, a character introduced in Solo, and then Bond himself. The two share a drink and then go out for a meal, where Boyd accidentally alludes to his time of origin. The two men part after a friendly warning from Bond to not ask too many questions about him.

The Guardian also published a Q&A by Boyd from this same fictional interview.

=== "Bond Strikes Camp" ===
"Bond Strikes Camp", written by Cyril Connolly, was first published in The London Magazine on April 1963.

The story was personally authorised by Ian Fleming. Connolly was a personal friend of Fleming and as chief reviewer at The Sunday Times had an office along the same hallway as him. His 1952 account of the Cambridge spy ring, The Missing Diplomats, was an inspiration for the creation of Fleming's Bond character. Although a parody, the story clearly mentions Bond by name and code number. An expensive, privately printed edition of 50 copies was made by the Shenval Press in 1963. Soon after, the story appeared in Connolly's miscellany collection Previous Convictions.

Author, critic and Bond author Kingsley Amis compared the story unfavourably to The Harvard Lampoon spoof Bond novel Alligator by claiming that "Parodies have their laughter-value, but the laughter is partly affectionate, and the successful parodist is moved partly by wanting to write like his original by wishing he'd thought of doing so first. Mr Cyril Connolly no doubt doesn't wish this in regard to Mr Fleming; his 'Bond Strikes Camp', in which M orders Bond to dress up as a woman, ostensibly for purposes of espionage, and then tries to get him into bed, is much too far from the original, never catches the note, gets elementary details wrong. E.g. M is made to call Bond 'Bond'. This happened last in 1954 (Live and Let Die, ch. 2). Every Fleming fan knows it's either 'James' or '007'."

== Significant unauthorised works ==
=== "Some Are Born Great" ===
"Some Are Born Great" by Johanna Harwood, credited as J.M. Harwood, was first published in 'Nursery World on 3 September 1959. It was reprinted in Now & Then (Jonathan Cape's in-house magazine) in spring 1960, and Movie Classics in 2012. The story, which is less than a page in length, details an intense card game with Bond facing off against an unseen opponent, only to reveal in the end that it's a game of Snap and this is a prepubescent Bond playing against a nanny. Harwood subsequently co-wrote the first two James Bond films, Dr. No and From Russia With Love.

=== "Holmes Meets 007" ===
Then I noticed the crestfallen figure standing near the window. "What should we do with Bond?" I asked. "Bond? Oh, send him back to his little bureaucratic niche, I expect. Really, I couldn't be less concerned."

"Holmes Meets 007", written by Donald Stanley, was first published in The San Francisco Examiner on 29 November 1964.

The story is narrated by Dr. John Watson, Sherlock Holmes' assistant. M and Bond visit Holmes and Watson at Holmes' Baker Street address. Holmes' deductive abilities impress M, who wishes Bond had the same talent. Bond questions if such intuitive talents could hold up against a SMERSH assassin. Bond confronts Holmes about the latter's drug addiction and accuses Watson of being the source of Holmes' narcotics supplier. Once Holmes admits it, Bond aims his Walther PPF [sic] at Watson and announces that Watson is an impostor, and none other than Bond's arch-enemy Ernst Stavro Blofeld - the man who killed Bond's wife Tracy. Holmes throughout the meeting has been fiddling his Stradivarius - much to everyone's annoyance - and brings it crashing down, knocking Bond's gun away. Holmes plunges a needle containing morphine into M's arm, quickly rendering him unconscious. Holmes reveals that M is none other than Professor Moriarty; Bond is nothing more than a "fairly ignorant tool" who had been unaware of his boss's treachery all this time.

The Beaune Press (San Francisco) published 247 numbered seven-page copies in December 1967. Copy 222 was numbered 221B, while copies 223–247 were numbered I–XXV.

=== "Toadstool" ===
The Harvard Lampoon, responsible for the Bond spoof Alligator, published another "J*mes B*nd" story. "Toadstool" appeared in PL*YB*Y, the 1966 Harvard Lampoon parody of Playboy magazine.

=== "License to Hug" ===
"License to Hug", written by Will Self, was first published in Esquire on November 1995.

Bond goes to Holland to kill an IRA hitman involved in drug smuggling. This story, part thriller, part satire on modern life, also mentions Bond by name and code number. Sorrell Kerbel notes that "Self proves just as adept at skewering by mimicry the stiff upper lip style and macho substance of Ian Fleming's James Bond books as he is at pillorying the brave new world of political correctness (with its very own thought police) in which the 'Therapeutic Hug and Stroke' is the weapon of choice."

=== "Your Deal, Mr. Bond" ===
The title piece of Phillip and Robert King's 2002 collection of bridge-related short stories, "Your Deal, Mr. Bond" features a James Bond who is assigned by M to defeat a villain named Saladin. Bond impersonates real-life bridge expert Zia Mahmood in order to combat Saladin at the bridge table. The short story includes bridge game charts in a similar fashion to that used by Ian Fleming in Moonraker, in which Bond similarly plays a high-stakes game of bridge against that novel's villain.

The book, despite being issued by a major publisher and containing undisguised references to the Bond characters, contains no reference to Ian Fleming Publications, suggesting the use of Bond, M and Miss Moneypenny is unofficial, and rendering this story likely apocryphal. Its placement in the Bond canon, therefore, is unknown. The story contains a cultural reference to Star Trek, however, which sets it outside of Fleming's timeline. It should not be confused with the 1987 John Gardner Bond novel, No Deals, Mr. Bond.

The authors previously wrote a similar book in 1996: Farewell, My Dummy, which likewise featured several novellas about bridge, each parodying a different author: Jeffrey Archer, Jane Austen, Raymond Chandler, Arthur Conan Doyle and Victor Mollo.

=== Licence Expired: The Unauthorized James Bond ===
On 1 January 2015, the original Ian Fleming novels and short stories entered the public domain in Canada and other countries in which the length of copyright remains at the Berne Convention minimum of the life of the author plus 50 years. As a result, it is now legal in those countries for the original writings of Ian Fleming to be republished, or adapted into other media, without permission of the Fleming estate or its agent, Ian Fleming Publications (formerly known as Gildrose Publications). It is also now legal in those countries for original material based on Bond and other characters and concepts introduced in Fleming's written works (though not those elements that are unique to Eon Production's Bond movies) to be published.

In late 2015, independent Canadian publishing house ChiZine Publications released Licence Expired: The Unauthorized James Bond, an anthology of 19 Bond short stories written by various Canadian and non-Canadian authors including Jeffrey Ford, Charles Stross, A.M. Dellamonica, James Alan Gardner, Corey Redekop, Jacqueline Baker, Richard Lee Byers, Laird Barron, Kathryn Kuitenbrouwer, Karl Schroeder, Claude Lalumiere, Robert Wiersema, and Ian Rogers. The stories examine different stages of the character's life from childhood to old age. The book's introduction states explicitly that due to copyright issues, it is not authorized for sale outside Canada. Thus, while the stories within have been collected, they remain unpublished officially outside Canada as of 2023.

== See also ==
- Outline of James Bond
