= Podsednik =

Podsednik may refer to:

- Scott Podsednik, former professional baseball player for Major League Baseball
- Lisa Dergan Podsednik, wife of Scott Podsednik
