= Zoe Nightshade (disambiguation) =

The name Zoe Nightshade can refer to either of the following fictional characters:

- Zoë Nightshade, from the Percy Jackson & the Olympians series
- Zoe Nightshade, a Bond girl from Agent Under Fire and Nightfire video games
