= A Hard Day's Death =

2008 novel by Raymond Benson

- Front cover
- Author: Raymond Benson
- Language: English
- Genre: Mystery novel, Thriller novel
- Publisher: Leisure Books
- Publication date: April 2008
- Publication place: United States
- Media type: Print

A Hard Day's Death is the first of a series of original mystery/thrillers by former James Bond author Raymond Benson. Published in April 2008 by Leisure Books, it has a rock and roll setting and features a detective named Spike Berenger. The book's title derives from The Beatles' album A Hard Day's Night.

A second book was published in 2009, titled Dark Side of the Morgue based on Pink Floyd's album The Dark Side of the Moon.
