= The Black Stiletto =

2011 novel by Raymond Benson

- First edition cover
- Author: Raymond Benson
- Language: English
- Series: The Black Stiletto
- Genre: Thriller
- Publisher: Oceanview Publishing
- Publication date: 5 September 2011
- Publication place: United States
- Pages: 288
- ISBN: 978-1-60809-020-4
- Followed by: The Black Stiletto: Black & White

The Black Stiletto is a thriller novel written by Raymond Benson; it was published in the US in September 2011. The first book in a series, it is the story of Judy Cooper, a young woman in late 1950s New York City, who becomes a masked vigilante. A parallel storyline in the present involves Judy as an elderly Alzheimer's patient being cared for by her grown son, Martin Talbot, who learns of Judy's secret through a series of diaries and ephemera that she kept hidden and in trust for him should she become incapacitated. Book series was optioned by Lonetree Entertainment in 2012. On October 14, 2015, it was announced that Mila Kunis will be executive producing a television series based on the book series for ABC Studios.

== Plot ==
Martin Talbot is an accountant whose mother—Judy Cooper Talbot—is in sheltered accommodation for sufferers of Alzheimer’s. Martin was given copies of his mother's diaries, written when she was younger.

Through the diaries Martin learns that she ran away from her abusive stepfather, took a bus to New York, and swore revenge on him. She found work in a diner and a room above a gym; she tried to take lessons in self-defence, but no-one would help as women in the mid-1950s were not supposed to fight. Taking a job at the gym, she persuaded the gym owner to teach her boxing. Subsequently, she attended a dojo and learned karate and other martial arts. Judy also learnt how to use a knife from a boyfriend connected to the mafia. After trying a number of different knives she settled on a stiletto and became a vigilante.

Judy's alter-ego, the Black Stiletto, was active for five years in New York and Los Angeles between 1958-1962 and then mysteriously disappeared. Since that time, the vigilante's image and mystique was exploited by the media in comics, films, and action figures. "Who was the Black Stiletto?" became a catch-question like "Who shot JFK?"

== Release and reception ==
The Black Stiletto was released in the US on 5 September 2011. As part of the promotional process for the novel, a free downloadable teaser short story, "The Black Stiletto's Autograph" was made available on the official website.

Reviewing The Black Stiletto, academic Dr Wesley Britton noted that "verisimilitude is one strength of what could have been just a comic-book romp without pictures" and that because of this, the novel was "a fast read, you don’t have to be a feminist to enjoy this fresh approach to super-heroes". Britton also commented on Benson's abilities, saying that he "is a master of description and pacing, so every page is both believable and tightly sketched. While this novel is self-contained, Benson leaves open a number of questions and threads so that at least one sequel is inevitable."

The reviewer for Popcorn Reads considered that "The writing ... is so well done that it flows beautifully for the reader", going on to say that the finished product is "a completely believable suspense novel". Overall the reviewer acknowledged that they "completely enjoyed every minute of this fast-paced novel ... WooHoo! A new series to look forward to!"

Library Journal described the book favorably as a "mashup of the work of Gloria Steinem, Ian Fleming, and Mario Puzo, all under the editorship of Stan Lee." Booklist gave the novel a starred review, calling it "prime escapism."

The novel's sequel, The Black Stiletto: Black & White, was published in May 2012. The third book, The Black Stiletto: Stars & Stripes was published April 2013. The final two books in the saga, The Black Stiletto: Secrets & Lies and The Black Stiletto: Endings & Beginnings, were published in January and November 2014, respectively. Benson has also made available a free teaser short story, "The Black Stiletto's Autograph", and a "Black Stiletto Song" (by Will Arrington), both of which can be downloaded from the official website.
