= Lisa Dergan =

American model and sportscaster

Playboy centerfold appearance
- July 1998
- Preceded by: Maria Luisa Gil
- Succeeded by: Angela Little

Personal details
- Born: August 10, 1970 (age 55) Corpus Christi, Texas
- Height: 5 ft 8.5 in (1.74 m)
- Official website

Lisa Dergan (born August 10, 1970) is an American model, actress, media personality, and sportscaster. She was Playboy's Playmate of the Month for July 1998.

Dergan has established a career beyond Playboy, in particular in the world of sportscasting. Her big break came in 2001, when she was hired to work a weekend sports show alongside Jim Hill at KCBS in Los Angeles. She joined Fox Sports Net in 2002. She has interviewed subjects such as Tiger Woods, John Elway, and Chuck Liddell, and has reported from such events as the Super Bowl, the Kentucky Derby, and the U.S. Open golf tournament.

She served as the co-host with Ken Ober on the USA Network game show Smush. In 2003, she hosted the reality wedding competition Race to the Altar, which featured wedding and lifestyle guru Colin Cowie.

She co-starred in the film The Arena with fellow Playmate Karen McDougal in 2001.

She was the St. Pauli Girl spokesmodel in 2003.

By appearing in the 1999 James Bond short story "Midsummer Night's Doom" by Raymond Benson (in which 007 visits the Playboy Mansion), Dergan has the distinction of being the first real person (rather than an actress playing a non-fictional character) ever to be awarded the status of Bond girl, as she has a relationship with Bond in the story.

== Personal life ==
In 2008, Dergan married baseball player Scott Podsednik. They divorced in the spring of 2017. She had previously dated film director Michael Bay.

Heather Kozar	Julia Schultz	Marliece Andrada	Holly Joan Hart	Deanna Brooks	Maria Luisa Gil
Lisa Dergan	Angela Little	Vanessa Gleason	Laura Cover	Tiffany Taylor	Dahm triplets
