= Are You Afraid of the Dark? The Tale of Orpheo's Curse =

1994 video game

- Developer: Viacom New Media
- Publisher: Viacom New Media
- Writer: Raymond Benson
- Composer: George Sanger
- Series: Are You Afraid of the Dark?
- Platforms: MS-DOS, Classic Mac OS
- Release: 1994
- Genres: Adventure, Horror
- Mode: Single-player

Are You Afraid of the Dark: The Tale of Orpheo's Curse is an adventure video game for MS-DOS and Classic Mac OS developed and published by Viacom New Media. Released in 1994, it is based on the TV show Are You Afraid of the Dark?. It has been described as a Myst clone and having Myst-like graphics. Producers from the network behind the brand collaborated with developers and oversaw the games.

== Development ==
Donna L. Friedman served as managing producer for Nickelodeon Interactive/Viacom New Media, where she led Nickelodeon's entry into the multimedia publishing business with games such as Are You Afraid of the Dark? and The Tale of Orpheo's Curse. A.l. Nilsen, VP-marketing for Viacom New Media, said "We have gone to great lengths to re-create the actual text and content of the TV programs our viewers enjoy in an interactive platform." Louis Fournier, Cinar VP of sales and marketing said "the CD-ROM is the strongest extension of the TV show that you’ll find today. And it is reaching the audience in a different fashion; the CD-ROM will enrich the viewers". Raymond Benson co-designed the game and wrote the screenplay.

The game was part of a trend that saw Hollywood studios making video game adaptions of projects. This posed a challenge for the Screen Actors Guild due to residuals, actor salaries, dense scripts, and the realities of filming.

In December 1994, Viacom was in the final testing phase of the game. The game didn't receive much advertising, and as a result, is rare.

== Reception ==
Much of the critical reception surrounded the game's lack of violence.

Mr. Bill's Adventureland said the game was "engrossing entertainment". Electronic Entertainment felt the game offered "limitless possibilities". The Washington Post wrote the game is "proof that interactive fiction doesn't need violence, gore or sex". (This was only a year or two after the video game violence congressional hearings over Mortal Kombat and Night Trap.) Sun-Sentinel said the game had a spooky atmosphere but was ultimately harmless. Just Adventure deemed it a great game for kids, and bemoaned its lack of sequels. MacHome felt the non-violent theme would be appealing to parents. Gamecreate deemed it "clunky". Adventure Gamers wrote that at the core of the title is a clever idea, implemented well.
