= Race to the Altar =

- Genre: Reality
- Presented by: Lisa Dergan
- Narrated by: Mitch Lewis
- Country of origin: United States
- Original language: English
- No. of seasons: 1

Production
- Executive producers: Robert Horowitz; Bill Paolantonio; Eric Schotz
- Running time: 44 minutes

Original release
- Network: NBC
- Release: July 30 – September 13, 2003

Race to the Altar is an American reality television series hosted by Lisa Dergan. The series premiered July 30, 2003, on NBC. The show found 8 engaged couples to compete in a series of physical and mental challenges designed to test the strength of their relationship. Couples who won the challenges become power couples and have the authority to eliminate other couples. The audience voted on the winning couple in the second-to-last episode and then in the last episode the winning couple gets the prize, a fantasy wedding planned by Colin Cowie. A two-hour series finale aired September 13, 2003.

== Link ==
Official Website
