= Corey Redekop =

Canadian novelist and short story writer

Corey Redekop is a Canadian novelist and short story writer. He is best known for his 2012 novel Husk, which was a finalist for the ReLit Award for Fiction in 2013.

Redekop was born and raised in Thompson, Manitoba and lived in Winnipeg before relocating to Fredericton, New Brunswick. His debut novel Shelf Monkey was published in 2007. His short stories have also appeared in the anthologies Licence Expired: The Unauthorized James Bond, The Exile Book of New Canadian Noir, The Bestiary, Superhero Universe and Those Who Make Us: Creature, Myth, and Monster Stories.
