= The James Bond Bedside Companion =

Non-fiction book by Raymond Benson

- First edition
- Author: Raymond Benson
- Publication date: 1984
- ISBN: 9780396083849

The James Bond Bedside Companion is a non-fiction book written by the official James Bond author, Raymond Benson, first published in 1984. It was later updated in 1988. The book was nominated for the Edgar Allan Poe Award for Best Biographical/Critical Work in 1985.

== Content ==
The book, split in five parts, includes information on "The James Bond Phenomenon", a biography on Ian Fleming the creator of James Bond, a biography on the fictional character James Bond, information on the novels, and finally information on the films.

Raymond Benson goes into considerable detail for each novel including continuation novels by authors Kingsley Amis (writing as Robert Markham) and John Gardner. Likewise it details information on every film from the first official Bond film Dr. No, to the then-recent Bond film Octopussy. Additionally, it discusses the two unofficial adaptations of Casino Royale and the remake of Thunderball called Never Say Never Again. The 1988 publication included information on A View to a Kill (1985) and The Living Daylights (1987) as well as the books written by John Gardner since the 1984 edition. In 2001 the now defunct PublishingOnline company created a print-on-demand "facsimile" edition from scans of the 1988 edition (the production plates were long lost). This edition suffered from poor scanning and is now out of print along with earlier 1980s editions.

As of January 2012, Crossroad Press has re-published the 1988 edition, with a new Foreword by Benson, as an e-book for Kindle, Nook, and other e-readers. Plans are underway by Crossroad to make the book available as a downloadable audiobook and a new print edition.

Author Raymond Benson also wrote modules for the James Bond 007 role playing game and, from 1997 to 2002, was commissioned by Ian Fleming Publications to succeed John Gardner as the author of the James Bond novels series.

== See also ==
- Outline of James Bond
