= Dark Side of the Morgue =

2009 novel by Raymond Benson

- First edition
- Author: Raymond Benson
- Language: English
- Genre: Mystery novel, Thriller novel
- Publisher: Leisure Books
- Publication date: March 2009
- Publication place: United States
- Media type: Print

Dark Side of the Morgue is the second of a series of original mystery/thrillers by former James Bond author Raymond Benson. Published in March 2009 by Leisure Books it has a rock and roll setting and features a detective named Spike Berenger. The book's title derives from Pink Floyd's album The Dark Side of the Moon.

In 2010, the novel was nominated for a Shamus Award for Best Paperback Original PI Novel of 2009 by the Private Eye Writers of America.
