= High Time to Kill =

Novel by Raymond Benson

- First edition cover
- Author: Raymond Benson
- Language: English
- Series: James Bond
- Genre: Spy fiction
- Publisher: Hodder & Stoughton
- Publication date: 6 May 1999
- Publication place: United Kingdom
- Media type: Print (Hardcover and Paperback)
- Pages: 304 pp (first edition, hardback)
- ISBN: 0-340-73876-6 (first edition, hardback)
- OCLC: 40681844
- Preceded by: Midsummer Night's Doom
- Followed by: The World Is Not Enough

High Time to Kill, published in 1999, is the fourth novel by Raymond Benson featuring Ian Fleming's secret agent, James Bond (including Benson's novelization of Tomorrow Never Dies). This is the first James Bond novel copyrighted by Ian Fleming Publications (formerly Glidrose Publications). It was published in the United Kingdom by Hodder & Stoughton and in the United States by Putnam. The novel's working title was A Better Way to Die.

== Plot summary ==
Bond faces off against a ruthless terrorist organisation called "The Union", whose trademark assassination technique is throat-slitting. Bond and his girlfriend Helena are attending a dinner party thrown by a former Governor of the Bahamas. The Governor, who owes a gambling debt to a member of The Union, has refused to pay up since he believes he was cheated. Accordingly, there is a heightened security presence at the event. However, an assassin disguises himself as one of the guards and kills the Governor, just as Bond realises the danger. Bond almost catches the assassin, who commits suicide before he can be interrogated.

A top secret British formula hidden in microfilm, codenamed "Skin 17", is stolen by two traitors, scientist Steven Harding and RAF officer Roland Marquis. The microdot is surgically implanted in the pacemaker of an unhealthy old man named Lee Ming, a former Chinese intelligence agent. Bond is sent to recover it before the Union can sell the microfilm to a foreign power.

Bond tracks Harding and Lee to Belgium, but they slip away while Bond fights and kills Harding's bodyguard Basil. MI6 tracks Lee to Nepal. It turns out, however, that Harding plans to double-cross the Union by having the plane carrying Lee hijacked. Le Gerant, the blind leader of The Union, immediately deduces Harding's double-cross and has him executed; Harding's body later washes up on the beach at Gibraltar.

The plane carrying Lee crashes in the Himalayas, so a deadly race between several parties commences to recover Skin 17. Bond, sexy mountaineer Hope Kendall, and Marquis, who was Bond's rival in their schoolboy days, lead one of the expeditions. Early on, they destroy the Chinese base camp, forcing that team to withdraw. Not long after, however, everyone on the British expedition is killed, save for Bond, Hope and Marquis. It turns out that Marquis was in on the theft with Harding, though they don't plan to sell it to The Union. The race climaxes with Bond battling Marquis atop the peak of Kangchenjunga. After a physical high-elevation fight, Bond trades oxygen from a mortally wounded Marquis for Skin 17. Bond and Hope return to base camp to find Paul Baack, a team member believed to have died with the rest, who reveals his affiliation with the Union and demands Skin 17. Bond and Hope manage to kill Baack and Skin 17 is returned to the British.

Meanwhile, Helena reveals herself to be a reluctant agent for The Union, who threatened to harm her family if she did not do their bidding, but she is killed before Bond can reach her.

=== Locations ===
Locations where the book takes place include:

- The Bahamas
- London
- Buckinghamshire
- Hampshire
- Belgium
- Delhi, India
- Morocco
- Kathmandu, Nepal
- Mt. Kangchenjunga
- Brighton

== Publication history ==
- UK first hardback edition: May 1999 Hodder & Stoughton
- US first hardback edition: June 1999 Putnam
- UK first paperback edition: July 1999 Coronet Books
- US first paperback edition: June 2000 Jove Books

== Reception ==
A reviewer for Publishers Weekly commended the author's skills by writing "the action he provides is fast and furious and Bond fans will note the narrative scores."

== See also ==
- Outline of James Bond
