= Never Dream of Dying =

2001 novel by Raymond Benson

- 2001 Coronet Books British paperback edition.
- Author: Raymond Benson
- Cover artist: Steve Stone
- Language: English
- Series: James Bond
- Genre: Spy fiction
- Publisher: Hodder & Stoughton
- Publication date: 2001
- Publication place: United Kingdom
- Media type: Print (Hardcover and Paperback)

Never Dream of Dying, first published in 2001, was the seventh novel by Raymond Benson featuring Ian Fleming's secret agent, James Bond (including film novelisations). Carrying the Ian Fleming Publications copyright, it was first published in the United Kingdom by Hodder & Stoughton and in the United States by Putnam.

== Plot summary ==
It begins when a police raid goes horribly wrong, killing innocent men, women, and even children. Bond knows the Union is behind the carnage, and vows to take them down once and for all. His hunt takes him to Paris, into a deadly game of predator and prey, and a fateful meeting with the seductive Tylyn Mignonne, a movie star with a sordid past, who may lead Bond to his final target—or his own violent end. Eventually it leads him to the Union's latest attack on society, which involves Tylyn's husband, Leon Essinger, and his new movie, Pirate Island, which stars Tylyn.

The conclusion to Benson's Union Trilogy. Locations are Nice, Paris, Cannes, Monte Carlo and Corsica (also briefly in Los Angeles, Japan and Chicago).

== Publication history ==
- UK first hardback edition: 3 May 2001 Hodder & Stoughton
- US first hardback edition: June 2001 Putnam
- UK first paperback edition: November 2001 Coronet Books
- US first paperback edition: May 2002 Jove Books

== See also ==
- Outline of James Bond
