= DoubleShot =

Novel by Raymond Benson

- 2000 Coronet Books British paperback edition.
- Author: Raymond Benson
- Language: English
- Series: James Bond
- Genre: Spy fiction
- Publisher: Hodder & Stoughton
- Publication date: 4 May 2000
- Publication place: United Kingdom
- Media type: Print (hardback & paperback)
- Pages: 320 pp (first edition, hardback)
- ISBN: 0-340-75168-1 (first edition, hardback)
- OCLC: 43341081

DoubleShot, first published in 2000, was the sixth novel by Raymond Benson featuring Ian Fleming's secret agent, James Bond (including film novelizations). Carrying the Ian Fleming Publications copyright, it was first published in the United Kingdom by Hodder & Stoughton and in the United States by Putnam. The novel's working title was Doppelganger.

== Plot summary ==
DoubleShot, the second novel in Raymond Benson's Union trilogy, again sets James Bond, 007 against the evil terrorist organization called the Union. Still smarting from their last encounter with 007 when he foiled their plans to get Skin 17 in High Time to Kill, the Union has decided that Britain and James Bond are their new number one priority, and targets. Coming up with an elaborate plan to plunge Britain into war and destroy Bond's reputation in the process, the Union sets up their scheme. Domingo Espada, a Spanish Nationalist/Gangster/Ex-Matador who wishes to see Gibraltar returned to Spain from Britain, is approached by Nadir Yassasin, the Union's master strategist, as the centrepiece to their plan. They plan to help Espada forcefully take control of Gibraltar, killing the British Prime Minister and the Governor of Gibraltar, and having a Bond-Double do it, thus ruining Bond's career and life. But first, through an elaborate series of events, they convince Bond he is losing his mind, and force him to investigate these happenings on his own, without approval from M or SIS.

Since Bond's return from the Himalayas, he begins experiencing terrible headaches, hallucinations, and black-outs. This leads him to Dr. Kimberly Feare. She diagnoses a lesion on the back of Bond's skull that is causing these symptoms. After getting Dr. Feare in bed, Bond wakes up to find her murdered, her throat slit ear-to-ear, the Union's mark. This causes Bond to leave England. Bond's trek takes him from England to Tangier, where he encounters the Taunt twins, Heidi and Hedy, CIA agents asked by M to bring him back to London. Here Bond finds the connection between the Union and Espada, and that he has some part in the Union's plan. Convincing M and the Taunts to play out his hand, Bond goes to Spain. On arrival in Spain, he encounters Margareta Piel, Espada's female assassin and a member of the Union. Followed closely by the climax of Bond vs. his double in Espada's practice bullfighting ring, and the culmination of the Union's plot at the Gibraltar peace conference, Bond takes his double's place and along with the Taunt twins, prevent the assassinations, kills Espada, Piel, Jimmy Powers (a high-ranking American in the Union, and their number one expert in stealth and tailing), and captures Yassasin, foiling the Union's plans once again.

== Publication history ==
- UK first hardback edition: April 2000 Hodder & Stoughton
- US first hardback edition: June 2000 Putnam
- UK first paperback edition: 3 August 2000 Coronet Books
- US first paperback edition: June 2001 Jove Books

== See also ==
- Outline of James Bond
