= The Man with the Red Tattoo =

Novel by Raymond Benson

- First edition
- Author: Raymond Benson
- Language: English
- Series: James Bond
- Genre: Spy fiction
- Publisher: Hodder & Stoughton
- Publication date: 2 May 2002
- Publication place: United Kingdom
- Media type: Print (Hardcover and Paperback)
- Pages: 320 pp (first edition, hardback)
- ISBN: 0-340-81914-6 (first edition, hardback)
- OCLC: 48837119
- Dewey Decimal: 813/.54 22
- LC Class: PS3552.E547666 M36 2002b

The Man with the Red Tattoo, first published in 2002, was the sixth and final original novel by Raymond Benson featuring Ian Fleming's character James Bond. Carrying the Ian Fleming Publications copyright, it was first published in the United Kingdom by Hodder & Stoughton and in the United States by Putnam. It was later published in Japan in 2003. The novel's working title was Red Widow Dawn.

After the publication of The Man with the Red Tattoo, Benson wrote the novelisation of Die Another Day, which was published later in the year. Die Another Day is considered Benson's final James Bond novel, the following Bond stories being a series of novels about a teenage James Bond in the 1930s by Charlie Higson (see Young Bond), and a trilogy of faux-autobiographies by Samantha Weinberg entitled The Moneypenny Diaries, focusing on Miss Moneypenny. On 28 August 2005 Ian Fleming Publications confirmed that it was planning to publish a one-off adult Bond novel in 2008 to mark the 100th anniversary of Ian Fleming's birth. In July 2007 it was confirmed that the book had been completed by Sebastian Faulks, titled Devil May Care.

Benson at one time had plans to release a collection of short Bond stories, but after abruptly announcing his retirement in early 2003 from writing Bond novels, the project was never pursued. Not counting novelisations, The Man with the Red Tattoo marks the 35th original James Bond novel (including short story collections) since Ian Fleming introduced the character nearly 50 years earlier.

== Plot introduction ==
On a flight from Japan to the United Kingdom, a young Japanese woman dies of a mysterious illness. The illness is a mutated version of the West Nile virus. James Bond finds out that not only was she the daughter of an important Japanese businessman, her entire family is also dead. James Bond travels to Japan in search of the killer. Here Bond reunites with his longtime friend Tiger Tanaka, who introduces him to a female Japanese agent who is later killed by the mutant virus.

== Publication history ==
- UK first hardback edition: 2 May 2002 Hodder & Stoughton
- US first hardback edition: 6 June 2002 Putnam
- UK first paperback edition: 9 June 2003 Coronet Books
- US first paperback edition: May 2003 Jove Books

== See also ==
- Outline of James Bond
