= Raymond Benson =

American writer

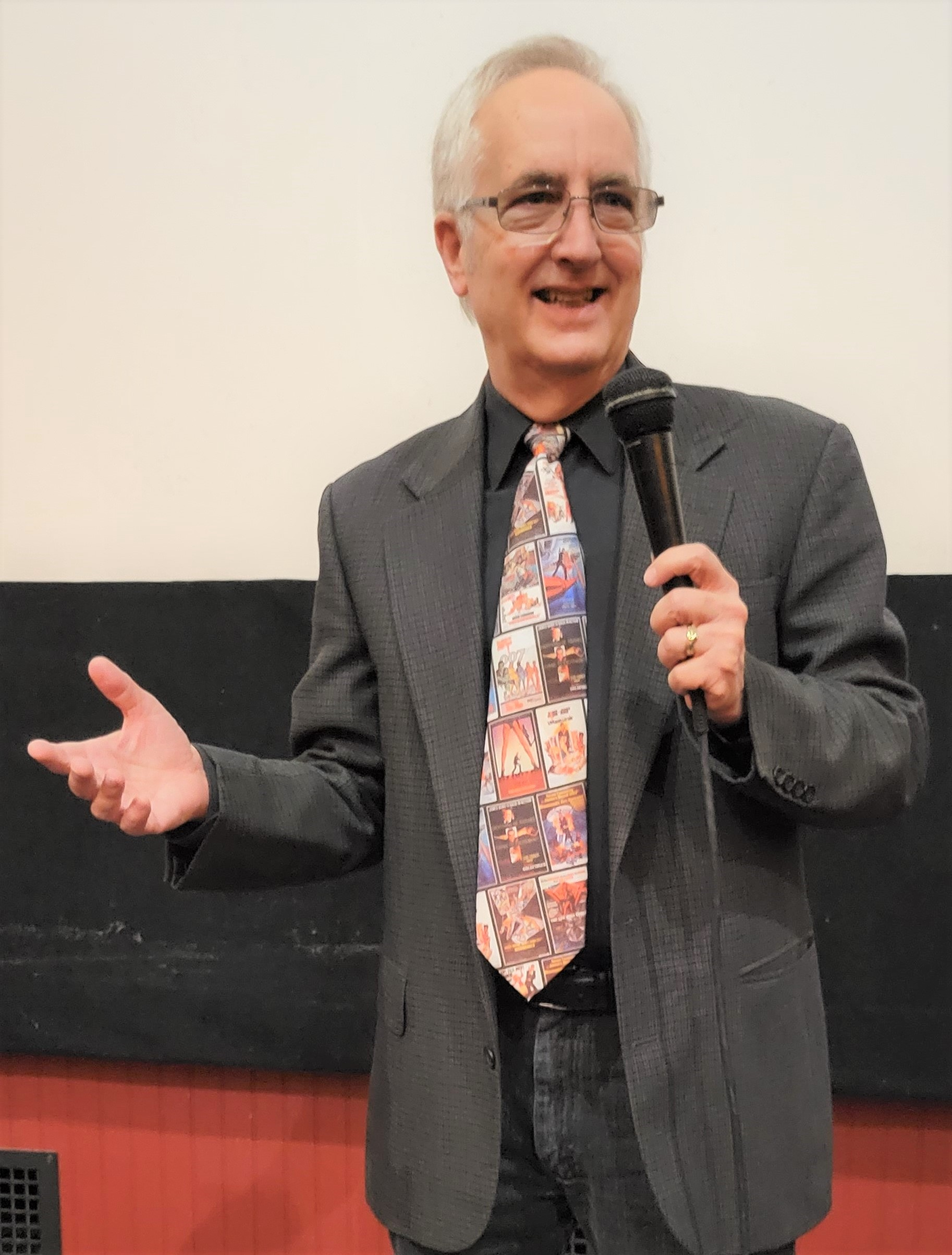
- Benson in Park Ridge, IL, 2022
- Born: 1955 (age 70–71); Midland, Texas, U.S.
- Education: University of Texas at Austin
- Occupation: Writer
- Writing career
- Genres: Spy fiction, suspense thriller

Raymond Benson (born 1955) is an American writer known for his James Bond novels published between 1997 and 2003.

== Early life and education ==
Benson was born in Midland, Texas and graduated from Permian High School in Odessa in 1973. In primary school Benson took an interest in the piano which would later in his life develop into an interest in composing music, mostly for theatrical productions. Benson also took part in drama at school and became the vice president of his high school's drama department, an interest that he would later pursue by directing stage productions in New York City after attending and receiving a degree in Drama Production—Directing from the University of Texas at Austin.

== James Bond works ==
In 1984, Benson wrote The James Bond Bedside Companion, a book dedicated to Ian Fleming, the official novels, and the films. The book was updated in 1988 and has since been re-released digitally without further updating. It was nominated for an Edgar Award by Mystery Writers of America in the Best Biographical/Critical Work category.

In 1985, he worked as a designer and writer on the computer game James Bond 007: A View to a Kill. He followed this in 1986 with work on a computer game version of Goldfinger and co-authoring the You Only Live Twice II module of the popular role-playing game James Bond 007.

In 1996, John Gardner resigned from writing Bond books. Glidrose Publications promptly chose Benson to replace him. As a James Bond novelist, Raymond Benson was initially controversial for being American, and for ignoring much of the continuity established by Gardner. The author did much to placate these concerns, however, and promptly embarked on regular tours to promote his novels in the UK, as well as occasional trips to mainland Europe. Several signing sessions were held at the offices of his UK publisher Hodder & Stoughton, and at London booksellers Murder One and James Bond specialists Adrian Harrington Ltd. In total, Benson wrote six James Bond novels, three novelizations, and three short stories. He was the first Bond author since Ian Fleming to write short stories (published in Playboy and TV Guide magazines and collected in anthologies published in 2008 and 2010).

Glidrose changed its name to Ian Fleming Publications commencing with Benson's novel, High Time to Kill. Benson resigned from writing Bond books in 2003.

1. "Blast from the Past" (short story, 1997)
2. Zero Minus Ten (1997)
3. Tomorrow Never Dies (novelization, 1997)
4. The Facts of Death (1998)
5. "Midsummer Night's Doom" (short story, 1999)
6. "Live at Five" (short story, 1999)
7. The World Is Not Enough (novelization, 1999)
8. High Time to Kill (1999)
9. DoubleShot (2000)
10. Never Dream of Dying (2001)
11. The Man with the Red Tattoo (2002)
12. Die Another Day (novelization, 2002)
13. The Hook and the Eye (Felix Leiter Novel, 2025)

Benson's novel The Man with the Red Tattoo inspired the government of Japan's Kagawa Prefecture in 2005 to erect a museum (the "007 Man with the Red Tattoo Museum", dedicated to the book) and honor Benson with the title of Goodwill Ambassador.

In 2008 High Time to Kill, Doubleshot, Never Dream of Dying and an extended version of his 1997 short story "Blast from the Past" (a sequel to Fleming's novel, You Only Live Twice) were grouped and released as an omnibus called The Union Trilogy: Three 007 Novels. A second anthology entitled Choice of Weapons was published in 2010 and contained Zero Minus Ten, The Facts of Death, The Man with the Red Tattoo, and the short stories "Midsummer Night's Doom" and "Live at Five".

In April 2014, Benson and former Bond author Jeffery Deaver collaborated—the first such collaboration between former Bond continuation authors—as co-editors of Ice Cold--Tales of Intrigue from the Cold War, an anthology sponsored by Mystery Writers of America containing short stories about the Cold War.

On August 12, 2023, Ian Fleming Publications announced that Benson's first novel, Zero Minus Ten, would be reprinted in the U.K. along with other continuation authors' works. Subsequently, on January 29, 2024, Ian Fleming Publications announced the publication of an e-book omnibus, James Bond: The Raymond Benson Years, containing his six original 007 novels.

In 2025, Ian Fleming Publications published the first-ever Felix Leiter novel (James Bond's American friend and ally), written by Benson. The Hook and the Eye is set in Fleming's 1950s timeline and was published first as a serial e-book in June, followed by a print publication in October. In 2026, The Hook and the Eye won the Scribe Award in the Best Original Novel—General category from the International Association of Media Tie-In Writers.

== Other works ==
Since authoring Bond novels, Benson has had a number of books published, including original suspense novels Face Blind (2003), Evil Hours (2004), the Shamus Award-nominated Dark Side of the Morgue (2009), The Secrets on Chicory Lane (2017), and The Mad, Mad Murders of Marigold Way (2022), as well as the non-fiction work The Pocket Essential Guide to Jethro Tull (Jethro Tull biography) (2002).

Benson was awarded the IPPY Gold (1st Place, tied) Medal in the Mystery Category from the Independent Publisher Book Awards for The Mad, Mad Murders of Marigold Way.

In 2004, Benson began writing the first of two books based on the acclaimed video game series, Splinter Cell, although both are credited to the pseudonym, David Michaels. Further titles in the Splinter Cell series have also been credited to David Michaels, but were not authored by Benson. The first book, Tom Clancy's Splinter Cell was published in 2004 followed by Tom Clancy's Splinter Cell: Operation Barracuda in 2005.

In 2008, Benson wrote A Hard Day's Death about a private investigator who looks into the death of a rock star. The book spawned a second novel in 2009 called Dark Side of the Morgue, which was nominated for a Shamus Award for Best Paperback Original PI Novel by the Private Eye Writers of America. The two novels plus a short story, "On the Threshold of a Death", were collected in 2011 as an e-book anthology, The Rock 'n' Roll Detective's Greatest Hits.

Benson also wrote the novelization of the video game Metal Gear Solid in 2008 and followed it in 2009 with a novelization of Metal Gear Solid 2: Sons of Liberty. His entry in the Gabriel Hunt pulp adventure series, Hunt Through Napoleon's Web, appeared as an e-book in 2010 and was published in print in 2011.

Further video game novelizations continued in 2011, when Benson co-authored Homefront--the Voice of Freedom with John Milius, as a prequel to the THQ videogame Homefront. 2012 saw the announcement that Benson would also write Hitman: Damnation, a prequel to the Square Enix videogame Hitman: Absolution.

Benson's first novel in a series of "women's action/adventure thrillers," The Black Stiletto, was published in September 2011. In anticipation of the book's publication, Benson released a free downloadable e-book short story, "The Black Stiletto's Autograph". The second book in the series, The Black Stiletto: Black & White, was published on May 30, 2012. The Black Stiletto: Stars & Stripes, was published in 2013, and The Black Stiletto: Secrets & Lies was published in early 2014. The fifth and final book of the saga, The Black Stiletto: Endings & Beginnings, was published in November 2014.

On October 14, 2015, it was announced that Mila Kunis will be executive producing a television series based on The Black Stiletto book series for ABC Studios.

== Bibliography ==
=== Fiction ===
- 1997 Zero Minus Ten (novel)
- 1997 Tomorrow Never Dies (novelization, based on the screenplay)
- 1998 The Facts of Death (novel)
- 1999 High Time to Kill (novel)
- 1999 The World Is Not Enough (novelization, based on the screenplay)
- 2000 DoubleShot (novel)
- 2001 Evil Hours (novel, revised edition published 2004)
- 2001 Never Dream of Dying (novel)
- 2002 The Man with the Red Tattoo (novel)
- 2002 Die Another Day (novelization, based on the screenplay)
- 2003 Face Blind (novel)
- 2004 Tom Clancy's Splinter Cell (original novel based on the Ubisoft videogame series, writing as "David Michaels")
- 2005 Tom Clancy's Splinter Cell: Operation Barracuda (original novel based on the Ubisoft videogame series, writing as "David Michaels")
- 2006 Sweetie's Diamonds (novel)
- 2008 A Hard Day's Death (novel)
- 2008 Metal Gear Solid (novelization, based on the Konami videogame)
- 2008 The Union Trilogy (anthology; contains three novels and one short story)
- 2009 Dark Side of the Morgue (novel)
- 2009 Metal Gear Solid 2: Sons of Liberty (novelization, based on the Konami videogame)
- 2010 Choice of Weapons (anthology; contains three novels and two short stories)
- 2010 Hunt Through Napoleon's Web (novel, writing "with" fictional character Gabriel Hunt)
- 2011 Homefront: The Voice of Freedom (novel, co-written with John Milius, based on the THQ videogame)
- 2011 Artifact of Evil (novel)
- 2011 Torment: A Love Story (novel)
- 2011 The Rock 'n' Roll Detective's Greatest Hits (anthology; contains two novels and a short story)
- 2011 The Black Stiletto (novel)
- 2012 The Black Stiletto: Black & White (novel)
- 2012 Hitman: Damnation (novel, based on the IO Interactive videogame series)
- 2013 The Black Stiletto: Stars & Stripes (novel)
- 2014 The Black Stiletto: Secrets & Lies (novel)
- 2014 The Black Stiletto: Endings & Beginnings (novel)
- 2015 The Black Stiletto: The Complete Saga (e-book only anthology of all five Black Stiletto novels)
- 2016 Dying Light: Nightmare Row (novel; prequel story to Techland's videogame; Polish edition was published in 2015)
- 2017 The Secrets on Chicory Lane (novel)
- 2018 In the Hush of the Night (novel)
- 2019 Blues in the Dark (novel)
- 2020 Hotel Destiny: A Ghost Noir (novel)
- 2022 The Mad, Mad Murders of Marigold Way (novel)
- 2024 James Bond: The Raymond Benson Years (e-book anthology of Benson's six original 007 novels)
- 2025 The Hook and the Eye (Felix Leiter Novel)

=== Non-fiction ===
- 1984 The James Bond Bedside Companion (UK and updated edition published in 1988)
- 2002 The Pocket Essential Guide to Jethro Tull

=== Short stories ===
- 1997 "Blast from the Past" (Playboy Magazine, January 1997 issue)
- 1999 "Midsummer Night's Doom" (Playboy Magazine, January 1999 issue)
- 1999 "Live at Five" (TV Guide Magazine, November 13, 1999, issue)
- 2006 "Thumbs Down" (published by Amazon Shorts)
- 2006 "The Plagiarist" (published by Amazon Shorts)
- 2006 "Another Rock 'n' Roll Hit" (published in crime anthology These Guns for Hire)
- 2009 "On the Threshold of a Death" (Crimespree Magazine, May 2009 issue)
- 2009 "After the Gig" (Popcorn Fiction)
- 2011 "The Devil is a Gentleman" (published in fantasy anthology Boondocks Fantasy)
- 2011 "The Black Stiletto's Autograph" (teaser to The Black Stiletto novel, published by Smashwords)
- 2013 "Once Upon a Time in the Woods" (published in crime anthology Kwik Krimes)
- 2014 "Ghosts" (included in Mystery Writers of America Presents Ice Cold--Tales of Intrigue from the Cold War, a short story anthology co-edited by Jeffery Deaver and Benson)
- 2014 "To Be or Not to Be" (published in anthology Europa Universalis IV--What If?)
- 2015 12+1—Twelve Short Thrillers and a Play (an anthology of previously published and unpublished short works)
- 2016 "The Purple Bag" (six-part serial thriller published online)
- 2017 "The MacGuffin" (e-book of complete online serial originally titled "The Purple Bag")
- 2023 "Sea People" (published in anthology Thrilling Adventure Yarns 2022)
- 2023 "The Beat" (published in anthology Brutal & Strange: Stories Inspired by the Songs of Elvis Costello)

=== Produced musical composition for theatre and film ===
- 1972 On Borrowed Time (book by Paul Osborne)
- 1974 Out of Gas (book and lyrics by Michael Robert David)
- 1975 Hugo Martyr (book and lyrics by Jeffrey Kindley)
- 1975 The Resurrection of Jackie Cramer (book and lyrics by Frank Gagliano, subsequent productions 1976, 1979, 1980)
- 1976 Primer for City Dwellers (book and lyrics by Bertolt Brecht)
- 1976 Paper Tiger (book and lyrics by Thomas Brasch, subsequent production 1980)
- 1977 Clue (lyrics by Stuart Howard)
- 1978 Alice in Wonderland (lyrics by Lewis Carroll)
- 1979 Miss Julie (play by August Strindberg, subsequent production 1982)
- 1981 I Can't Imagine Tomorrow (play by Tennessee Williams)
- 1981 Deirdre (book and lyrics by Norman Morrow)
- 1984 The Man Who Could See Through Time (play by Terri Wagener)
- 1984 Charlotte's Web (play by Joe Robinette based on the novel, subsequent production 1985)
- 1987 The Lucky Chance (play by Aphra Behn)
- 1989 Hyde Park (play by James Shirley)
- 2019 Ghosts in the Ink (short film by Phil McCarron and Igor Lewicki)

=== Produced plays ===
- 1977 Clue (book and score)
- 2005 Second Chance (co-written by Doug Redenius)

=== Computer games ===
- 1985 Stephen King's The Mist (Designer/Writer; Mindscape)
- 1985 A View to a Kill (Designer/Writer; Mindscape)
- 1986 Goldfinger (Designer/Writer; Mindscape)
- 1992 Ultima VII: The Black Gate (Story Direction, Head Writer, Composer--"Love Theme"; Origin Systems)
- 1992 Ultima: Runes of Virtue (Score Co-composer; Origin Systems)
- 1993 Ultima VII Part Two: Serpent Isle (Co-Writer; Origin Systems)
- 1993 Return of the Phantom (Designer/Writer; MicroProse)
- 1994 Are You Afraid of the Dark? The Tale of Orpheo's Curse (Story Direction, Head Writer; Composer--"Frederico's Song"; Viacom New Media)
- 1995 The Indian in the Cupboard (Designer/Writer; Viacom New Media)
- 1995 Dark Seed II (Designer/Writer; Cyberdreams)

=== Role-playing game ===
- 1986 You Only Live Twice II: Back of Beyond (Designer/Writer; Victory Games, Inc.)

== See also ==
- List of novelists from the United States
