= List of James Bond allies =

Characters in the films and novels

This is a list of allies of James Bond who appear throughout the film series and novels.

== MI6 ==
=== M ===
Secret Intelligence Service M is a Rear Admiral of the Royal Navy, and the head of the Secret Intelligence Service. Ian Fleming based the character on a number of people he knew who commanded sections of British intelligence. M has appeared in the novels by Fleming and seven continuation authors, as well as 24 films. M has been portrayed by Bernard Lee, Robert Brown, Judi Dench, Ralph Fiennes, John Huston and Edward Fox.

=== Miss Moneypenny ===
Secret Intelligence Service Miss Moneypenny is the secretary to M. The films depict her as having a reserved romantic interest in James Bond, although Fleming's novels do not imply such a relationship while the John Gardner and Raymond Benson novels emphasise it more. In the film series, Moneypenny has been portrayed by Lois Maxwell, Barbara Bouchet, Pamela Salem, Caroline Bliss, Samantha Bond and Naomie Harris.

=== Q ===
Secret Intelligence Service Q (standing for Quartermaster) is the head of Q Branch (or later Q Division), the fictional research and development division of the British Secret Service. His real name is Major Geoffrey Boothroyd, but Bond and M never use his name. He has appeared in 20 of 23 Eon Bond films; all except Live and Let Die, Casino Royale and Quantum of Solace. The character was also featured in the non-Eon Bond films Casino Royale (1967) and Never Say Never Again. He has been portrayed by Desmond Llewelyn for most of the films, and by Peter Burton, Geoffrey Bayldon, Alec McCowen, John Cleese (first as R in The World Is Not Enough), and Ben Whishaw.

=== Bill Tanner ===
Chief of Staff

William "Bill" Tanner is MI6's Chief of Staff. Tanner is a Bond ally appearing regularly in the novels of Ian Fleming and John Gardner, as well as in Kingsley Amis' Colonel Sun, but did not become a regular cinematic character until the Pierce Brosnan and Daniel Craig era of films. Among his most prominent cinematic roles was in For Your Eyes Only (1981), in which Tanner was given a bigger part while M was "on leave", due to Bernard Lee's death that prevented him from reprising his role as M in the film. He otherwise has minor roles in The Man with the Golden Gun (1974), and appears in two of the four Brosnan films. Tanner appears in four of the five Craig films, taking on an increased role as M's chief aide and a friend and ally of Bond.

In 1965, Amis wrote the authorised spin-off The Book of Bond, or Every Man His Own 007, a tongue-in-cheek guide to being a spy. The book is not credited to Amis, but rather to Lt. Col. William "Bill" Tanner.

- Michael Goodliffe (1974) (uncredited)
- James Villiers (1981)
- Michael Kitchen (1995–1999)
- Rory Kinnear (2008–2021)

=== Mary Goodnight ===
Mary Goodnight is Bond's second personal secretary. She first appears in the novel On Her Majesty's Secret Service, then again in You Only Live Twice. By the time of her appearance in The Man with the Golden Gun, she has been assigned to the Kingston station of the service, although she has a much larger role. She appears later in the Jeffery Deaver novel Carte Blanche. She is shown to have a strong friendship with Miss Moneypenny.

She appears in the film The Man with the Golden Gun as a Bond girl, played by Britt Ekland.

=== Loelia Ponsonby ===
Loelia Ponsonby is Bond's shared personal secretary in many of the Bond novels. She is also the secretary for 008 and 0011, both of whom share an office with Bond. She retires and is replaced in On Her Majesty's Secret Service by Mary Goodnight after she marries a member of the Baltic Exchange. For the films, her flirtatious relationship with Bond is transferred to and replaced by Miss Moneypenny. Ponsonby nearly made an appearance in GoldenEye, but she was removed from the final draft. The name of the character may be based on the Duchess of Westminster of the same name.

=== Charles Robinson ===
Charles Robinson is the Deputy Chief of Staff at MI6. He first appears in Tomorrow Never Dies, then later in The World Is Not Enough, and Die Another Day. Played by Colin Salmon, Robinson appears to be M's right-hand man and is often seen at her side. When Bond reports in with MI6, he often does so to Robinson.

=== Smithers ===
One of Q's assistants, Smithers makes two film appearances: in For Your Eyes Only and Octopussy. He is played by Jeremy Bulloch. He is a distinct character from Colonel Smithers (Richard Vernon), a Bank of England official whom Bond (Sean Connery) consults in the novel Goldfinger and its film version.

=== 00 agents ===
The 00 Section of MI6 is considered the elite of the Secret Service. Agents with the 00 prefix have proven themselves capable enough in the field to be entrusted with the licence to kill: the authorisation to, at their own discretion, commit acts of assassination and other controversial activities in order to complete their missions, without having to first seek permission from headquarters.

The following 00 agents have been referenced onscreen in the James Bond films. Additional 00 agents, ranging from 001 to 0012, have been referenced in literature and in comic strips.

- 002 – Mentioned in The Man with the Golden Gun, named Bill Fairbanks and killed by Francisco Scaramanga (Christopher Lee). A different 002 (name not revealed but played by Glyn Baker) appears during the opening sequence of The Living Daylights.
- 003 – Body found in a snowbank at the start of A View to a Kill.
- 004 – Killed during the opening sequence of The Living Daylights. Played by Frederick Warder.
- 005 – Seen attending a meeting during Thunderball. Played by Charles Price.
- 006 – Named Alec Trevelyan (Sean Bean), a one-time ally and friend of Bond who is presumed dead for nine years; he is the primary antagonist in GoldenEye.
- 007 – Can refer to both James Bond and Nomi (Lashana Lynch), MI6 agent holder of the codename in No Time to Die.
- 008 – Mentioned by M in Goldfinger as a potential replacement for Bond if his mission fails. Bond also mentions this to Auric Goldfinger (Gert Fröbe) himself. 008 is also mentioned in The Living Daylights as an alternate choice to assassinate General Leonid Pushkin (John Rhys-Davies) if Bond (Timothy Dalton) refuses to do so.
- 009 – Seen early in Octopussy and played by Andy Bradford, he is killed by Mischka (David Meyer) and Grischka (Anthony Meyer), twins working for General Orlov (Steven Berkoff). However, 009 still manages to complete his mission by returning a forged Fabergé egg and Bond later avenges his death. 009 is also mentioned in the film The World Is Not Enough as the agent who initially shoots Viktor Zokas (Robert Carlyle). 009 is mentioned again in Spectre as the intended recipient of the Aston Martin DB10 after it was reassigned from Bond. Bond steals the car for use in his own mission, leaving 009 without it.

Additional unidentified 00 agents are seen briefly in Thunderball and The World Is Not Enough.

== Recurring allies ==
=== Felix Leiter ===
Central Intelligence Agency

- Jack Lord (1962)
- Cec Linder (1964)
- Rik Van Nutter (1965)
- Norman Burton (1971)
- David Hedison (1973 & 1989)
- Bernie Casey (1983)
- John Terry (1987)
- Jeffrey Wright (2006, 2008 & 2021)

A revised version of the character of Felix Leiter appears in the 1954 television adaptation of Casino Royale. In that version, Leiter is a British agent named Clarence Leiter and is played by Michael Pate.

=== General Anatoly Gogol ===
General Anatoly Gogol is the head of the KGB in the films The Spy Who Loved Me, Moonraker, For Your Eyes Only, Octopussy, and A View to a Kill. In his final appearance, in The Living Daylights, the character has become a post-Glasnost envoy in the Foreign Service and is succeeded as head of the KGB by General Leonid Pushkin. In the end credits of the film, his first name is listed as "Anatol", although in The Spy Who Loved Me, M referred to him as Alexis.

Gogol is played by Walter Gotell (who also played SPECTRE henchman Morzeny in From Russia with Love). With the KGB, Gogol often allies himself with Bond to stave off the possibility of war with the West, an ideal that is not always shared with his comrades—such as when he argues against Soviet General Orlov's reckless proposal of military conquest in Octopussy, and uncovers Orlov's theft of priceless jewels from the Kremlin.

Only in For Your Eyes Only and A View to a Kill does Gogol act as an enemy, but even then his actions are more those of a respectful competitor. He particularly opposes the methods of the villain Max Zorin (Christopher Walken) in A View to a Kill. General Gogol has a secretary named Miss Rublevitch, played by Eva Rueber-Staier, being some sort of Soviet counterpart to Miss Moneypenny.

=== Sir Frederick Gray ===
Sir Frederick Gray is the Minister of Defence in the films The Spy Who Loved Me, Moonraker, For Your Eyes Only, Octopussy, A View to a Kill, and The Living Daylights. He is always listed in the closing credits as "Minister of Defence", and is played by Geoffrey Keen.

In The Spy Who Loved Me, after being briefed on his forthcoming mission to Egypt, Bond holds a private discussion with Gray, to whom he refers as "Freddie". It is never revealed how they know each other well enough for Bond to be so informal. In the next few films, Bond calls Gray "Minister", for most of their scenes include other officials. It is also suggested that he belongs to no particular political party; direct references are made to Margaret Thatcher in For Your Eyes Only, even though he had also held the post in The Spy Who Loved Me and Moonraker – which were both made during the Wilson-Callaghan government.

=== Marc-Ange Draco ===
Draco is the head of the Unione Corse, a (real-life) major European crime syndicate and a rival of SPECTRE. Also an industrialist, his business empire acts as front for his activities. He appears in the novel On Her Majesty's Secret Service, working as an ally of Bond. His daughter Countess Teresa "Tracy" Draco di Vicenzo marries Bond but is killed shortly thereafter. He reappears in the novel Never Dream of Dying, where 007's former father-in-law turns out to be linked to the villain of the Union. He also appears in the film On Her Majesty's Secret Service, portrayed by Gabriele Ferzetti.

=== May Maxwell ===
May Maxwell is Bond's loyal and elderly Scottish housekeeper, who is often mentioned in Ian Fleming's Bond novels. She also appears in several John Gardner novels and the Anthony Horowitz novel Trigger Mortis, as well making a cameo appearance in the first Young James Bond novel, SilverFin. She has yet to make an appearance in any of the Bond films. May is named after the housekeeper of Ivar Bryce, a friend of Fleming.

=== René Mathis ===
Mathis is a long-time friend of Bond and an agent of the French secret service Service de Documentation Extérieure et de Contre-Espionnage (SDECE). He is a main character in Casino Royale and a supporting character in From Russia, with Love, Never Dream of Dying and Devil May Care. Mathis captures the SMERSH villain Rosa Klebb, and uses cardiopulmonary resuscitation to keep Bond alive until a doctor arrives after Bond is poisoned by Klebb. In Casino Royale, it is revealed that he originally met Bond on assignment in Monte Carlo prior to World War II, when Bond was trying to crack down on a group of Romanians cheating at a local casino with the use of invisible ink. Mathis is reassigned to work with Bond at the time of the events in Casino Royale, where he poses as a radio salesman, assisting Bond and introducing him to Vesper Lynd.

In the novel Thunderball, Bill Tanner asks Moneypenny to send a copy of SPECTRE's ransom demand letter to Mathis at the Deuxième Bureau. In Never Dream of Dying, he is captured by the head of the Union Le Gérant and is blinded with lasers. Bond later saves him from imprisonment. A younger version of Mathis appears in the Young Bond short story "A Hard Man to Kill".

The characters of Mathis and Vesper Lynd are combined to form Valerie Mathis (Linda Christian) in the original 1954 Climax! production of "Casino Royale". Mathis first appears onscreen in the 1967 version of Casino Royale, played by Duncan Macrae. Here, he is a police officer, prompting Evelyn Tremble (Peter Sellers) to state that it has been worrying him that despite his supposed nationality, Mathis has a Scots accent: "Aye, it worries me too", Mathis replies.

In the 2006 adaptation of Casino Royale, Mathis is a French secret service agent, played by Giancarlo Giannini. Mathis is suspected of being a traitor and informant to Le Chiffre (Mads Mikkelsen) and arrested. Upon the discovery that Vesper (Eva Green) was the real traitor, Bond advises that MI6 should continue interrogating Mathis because his innocence has not yet been established. Mathis appears again in Quantum of Solace, having retired to an Italian villa given to him by MI6 as compensation for his interrogation and imprisonment. He joins Bond to bring down Dominic Greene (Mathieu Amalric), only to be killed by corrupt policemen working for Greene. Before dying, Mathis asks Bond to forgive Vesper and make peace with her death.

=== Sir James Molony ===
A noted neurologist whose expertise is frequently employed by M and the Secret Services, Molony appears in the novels Dr. No, Thunderball, You Only Live Twice, and The Man with the Golden Gun.

=== Sheriff J. W. Pepper ===
Sheriff John Wayne (J. W.) Pepper is a parish sheriff in Louisiana. He appears in the films Live and Let Die and The Man with the Golden Gun. Played by Clifton James, he is mostly used as comic relief.

In Live and Let Die, he chases Bond (Roger Moore)'s and Dr. Kananga (Yaphet Kotto)'s speedboats, believing them to be young people joyriding. His first film appearance also reveals a comedic rivalry with Louisiana State Police troopers, who are shown kidding him when his car is destroyed by a fallen speedboat of Kananga's. After a chase that destroys several police cars, the state police tell him that Bond is a spy and Pepper quips, "On whose side??"

In The Man with the Golden Gun, a vacationing Pepper is shown having a boat tour with his wife in Thailand and briefly seeing Bond on another boat. He is later seen trying an AMC Hornet that Bond steals from a showroom, and, convinced he is chasing communists, helps Bond in the subsequent car chase with Francisco Scaramanga's AMC Matador, only to be arrested by the Royal Thai Police together with the British operative.

Both of Pepper's appearances, particularly in the latter film, have been criticised by some Bond fans who view him as symptomatic of the overly comic and slapstick nature of some of the Moore-era movies. Roger Moore said "He gave my first two films a great, fun character", on actor Clifton James's death.

=== Quarrel ===
Quarrel is a Cayman Islander living in Jamaica. He first appears in the novel Live and Let Die as Bond's guide while 007 is investigating Mr. Big. Quarrel later appears in the novel Dr. No to help Bond infiltrate Dr. Julius No's island, Crab Key. The only Bond film in which Quarrel appears is the 1962 film Dr. No, played by John Kitzmiller where, as in the novel, he is killed by Dr. No (Joseph Wiseman)'s mythical "dragon", which is actually a flamethrower-equipped vehicle.

As the films were made out of sequence from the novels, for the film adaptation of Live and Let Die, Quarrel was changed to his son Quarrel Jr., played by Roy Stewart, whom Bond teams up with, helping him destroy Dr. Kananga's poppy fields.

=== John Strangways and Mary Trueblood ===
John Strangways is a former Lieutenant Commander in the special branch of the Royal Naval Volunteer Reserve. He makes his first appearance in the novel Live and Let Die as the chief Secret Service agent in the Caribbean. Strangways is roughly 35 years old and wears a black patch over one eye. He later appears in the novel Dr. No, where he and his Number 2, Mary Trueblood (a former Chief Officer in the Women's Royal Naval Service), are assassinated for prying into Dr. Julius No's business. Mary Trueblood is based on Fleming's secretary from The Sunday Times, Una Trueblood. Strangways makes his only appearance in the films in Dr. No, where, as in the novel, he is killed for investigating the title character. Unlike in the novel, however, Strangways does not wear an eyepatch in the film. He is portrayed by Timothy Moxon and voiced by Robert Rietty (who later voiced villains Emilio Largo in Thunderball and Ernst Stavro Blofeld in For Your Eyes Only). Mary is portrayed by Dolores Keator and dubbed by Nikki van der Zyl; both were Jamaican residents and were not in London for the final dubbing of the film.

=== Tiger Tanaka ===
Japanese Secret Service

Tiger Tanaka is an ally to Bond in the novel You Only Live Twice and its film adaptation. He is the head of the Japanese Secret Service (Koan-Chosa-Kyoku) and resides within a secret underground office complex beneath the streets of Tokyo, his identity being the most closely guarded secret in Japan. Tanaka helps Bond disguise himself to look Japanese so that Blofeld will not recognise him. Tanaka arranges for Bond to marry a girl native to the land, Kissy Suzuki (Mie Hama), in order to provide extra cover. In the film, Tanaka is portrayed by Tetsurō Tamba. He supplies an army of ninjas to attack Ernst Stavro Blofeld (Donald Pleasence) and leads the attack on Blofeld's volcano base. Tanaka also appears in the novel The Man with the Red Tattoo and in the Dynamite Entertainment-published spin-off comic book, Felix Leiter.

In the novel, the character was based on one of Fleming's friends, Torao Saito – although he was not connected to Japanese intelligence, but was in fact a well-known polymath in Japan, being a journalist, writer, photographer and architect.

=== Ronnie Vallance ===
Vallance appears in four of the Bond novels: Moonraker, Diamonds Are Forever, On Her Majesty's Secret Service and Colonel Sun, as well as two of the short stories: "The Property of a Lady" and "Risico". He is the head of Special Branch, with the Metropolitan Police rank of Assistant Commissioner, and the boss of Gala Brand.

=== Jack Wade ===
Central Intelligence Agency Jack Wade is an American CIA agent who appears in the films GoldenEye and Tomorrow Never Dies. He is played by Joe Don Baker. Eight years before GoldenEye, Baker played villain Brad Whitaker in The Living Daylights.

=== Valentin Dmitrovich Zukovsky ===
KGB Valentin Dmitrovich Zukovsky (Russian: Вaлeнтин Дмитриeвич Зуковский) is a former KGB agent turned Russian mafia head who runs a bar, a casino, and a caviar factory. When he was younger (and a KGB agent), a conflict with Bond ended with Bond shooting Zukovsky in the leg, causing him to walk with a limp. After leaving the KGB, Zukovsky at first holds a grudge towards Bond, almost shooting him in his manhood. However, he soon realizes when dealing with Bond means turning a profit. Played by Robbie Coltrane, Zukovsky makes two appearances in the films, his first being in GoldenEye before being shot and mortally wounded by Elektra King (Sophie Marceau) in The World Is Not Enough. He lives long enough after being shot to execute a trick shot using his cane gun, enabling Bond to escape King's trap.

=== Dr. Madeleine Swann ===
Dr. Madeleine Swann is a psychiatrist and daughter of recurring villain Mr. White (Jesper Christensen), who assists Bond in his mission and becomes his love interest in the film Spectre and continues to be a central character in the subsequent film No Time to Die. Swann is the second Bond girl to appear in multiple films, the second to marry Bond and the first to have a child with him.

The two fell in love through the course of SPECTRE in a manner similar to Diana Rigg's Tracy di Vicenzo in On Her Majesty's Secret Service, including similar setpieces and in No Time to Die, Bond believed that Swann had betrayed him to SPECTRE, leading him to abandon her without knowing of her pregnancy. After five years, the two met again while following leads and reconnected. Later, when Bond was infected with a nanobot weapon that would inevitably kill both Swann and his child were they to be exposed, he sacrificed himself to save the lives of Swann and his daughter.

== Film allies ==
This section lists allies who each appear in only one film.

Film	Character	Actor/actress	Affiliation	Status
Dr. No	Honey Ryder	Ursula Andress	Bond girls	Active
Dr. No	Quarrel	John Kitzmiller	Central Intelligence Agency	Deceased
Dr. No	Pleydell-Smith	Louis Blaazer		Active
Dr. No	Puss-Feller	Lester Prendergast (uncredited)		Active
From Russia with Love	Tatiana Romanova	Daniela Bianchi	Bond girls	Active
From Russia with Love	Kerim Bey	Pedro Armendáriz	British Intelligence	Deceased
Goldfinger	Pussy Galore	Honor Blackman	Auric Industries Bond girls	Active
Goldfinger	Jill Masterson	Shirley Eaton	Bond girls	Deceased
Goldfinger	Tilly Masterson	Tania Mallet	Bond girls	Deceased
Goldfinger	Colonel Smithers	Richard Vernon	Bank of England	Active
Thunderball	Dominique "Domino" Derval	Claudine Auger	Bond girls	Active
Thunderball	Patricia Fearing	Molly Peters	Shrublands Spa	Active
Thunderball	Paula Caplan	Martine Beswick	Bond girls	Deceased
You Only Live Twice	Tiger Tanaka	Tetsurō Tamba	Japanese Secret Service	Active
You Only Live Twice	Aki	Akiko Wakabayashi	Japanese Secret Service	Deceased
You Only Live Twice	Kissy Suzuki	Mie Hama	Bond girls	Active
You Only Live Twice	Dikko Henderson	Charles Gray	British Intelligence	Deceased
You Only Live Twice	Ling	Tsai Chin	British Intelligence	Active
On Her Majesty's Secret Service	Tracy Bond	Diana Rigg	Wife of James Bond	Deceased
On Her Majesty's Secret Service	Marc-Ange Draco	Gabriele Ferzetti	British Intelligence	Active
On Her Majesty's Secret Service	Campbell	Bernard Horsfall	British Intelligence	Deceased
On Her Majesty's Secret Service	Sir Hilary Bray	George Baker	Royal College of Arms	Active
Diamonds Are Forever	Tiffany Case	Jill St. John	Unnamed syndicate	Active
Diamonds Are Forever	Sir Donald Munger	Laurence Naismith	British Intelligence	Active
Diamonds Are Forever	Willard Whyte	Jimmy Dean	British Intelligence	Active
Diamonds Are Forever	Plenty O'Toole	Lana Wood	Bond girls	Deceased
Live and Let Die	Solitaire	Jane Seymour	Dr. Kananga	Active
Live and Let Die	Harold Strutter	Lon Satton	CIA	Deceased
Live and Let Die	Quarrel Jr.	Roy Stewart	Central Intelligence Agency	Active
Live and Let Die	Rosie Carver	Gloria Hendry	Dr. Kananga	Deceased
The Man with the Golden Gun	Colthorpe	James Cossins	MI6	Active
The Man with the Golden Gun	Mary Goodnight	Britt Ekland	Bond girls	Active
The Man with the Golden Gun	Lieutenant Hip	Soon-Tek Oh	MI6	Active
The Man with the Golden Gun	Andrea Anders	Maud Adams	Francisco Scaramanga	Deceased
The Spy Who Loved Me	Agent XXX Major Anya Amasova	Barbara Bach	Soviet Army/KGB	Active
The Spy Who Loved Me	Admiral Hargreaves	Robert Brown	Royal Navy	Active
The Spy Who Loved Me	Commander Carter	Shane Rimmer	U.S. Navy	Active
The Spy Who Loved Me	Sheikh Hosein	Edward De Souza	British Intelligence	Active
Moonraker	Holly Goodhead	Lois Chiles	Bond girls	Active
Moonraker	Corinne Dufour	Corinne Cléry	Drax Industries	Deceased
Moonraker	Manuela	Emily Bolton	British Intelligence	Active
Moonraker	Jaws	Richard Kiel	Hugo Drax	Active
Moonraker	Dolly	Blanche Ravalec	Jaws	Active
For Your Eyes Only	Melina Havelock	Carole Bouquet		Active
For Your Eyes Only	Milos Columbo	Chaim Topol	Self-employed	Active
For Your Eyes Only	Bibi Dahl	Lynn-Holly Johnson		Active
For Your Eyes Only	Jacoba Brink	Jill Bennett		Active
Octopussy	Octopussy	Maud Adams	Self-employed/Kamal Khan, Bond girls	Active
Octopussy	Magda	Kristina Wayborn	Octopussy/Kamal Khan	Active
Octopussy	Penelope Smallbone	Michaela Clavell	MI6	Active
Octopussy	Jim Fanning	Douglas Wilmer	British Intelligence	Active
Octopussy	Vijay	Vijay Amritraj	British Intelligence	Deceased
Octopussy	Bianca	Tina Hudson	British Intelligence	Active
A View to a Kill	Stacey Sutton	Tanya Roberts	Bond girls	Active
A View to a Kill	Kimberley Jones	Mary Stävin	Bond girls	Active
A View to a Kill	Achille Aubergine	Jean Rougerie	Sûreté	Deceased
A View to a Kill	Sir Godfrey Tibbett	Patrick Macnee	Central Intelligence Agency	Deceased
A View to a Kill	Pola Ivanova	Fiona Fullerton	KGB	Active
A View to a Kill	Chuck Lee	David Yip	Central Intelligence Agency	Deceased
A View to a Kill	May Day	Grace Jones	Max Zorin	Deceased
The Living Daylights	Kara Milovy	Maryam d'Abo		Active
The Living Daylights	Saunders	Thomas Wheatley	British Intelligence	Deceased
The Living Daylights	General Leonid Pushkin	John Rhys-Davies	KGB	Active
The Living Daylights	Kamran Shah	Art Malik	Mujahideen	Active
Licence to Kill	Pam Bouvier	Carey Lowell	CIA, Bond girls	Active
Licence to Kill	Lupe Lamora	Talisa Soto	Franz Sanchez	Active
Licence to Kill	Sharkey	Frank McRae	Central Intelligence Agency	Deceased
Licence to Kill	Kwang	Cary-Hiroyuki Tagawa	Narcotics Bureau, Hong Kong Police	Deceased
GoldenEye	Natalya Fyodorovna Simonova	Izabella Scorupco	Russian government, Bond girls	Active
Tomorrow Never Dies	Wai Lin	Michelle Yeoh	Chinese Intelligence, Bond girls	Active
Tomorrow Never Dies	Paris Carver	Teri Hatcher	Elliot Carver	Deceased
Tomorrow Never Dies	Admiral Roebuck	Geoffrey Palmer	British Navy	Active
The World Is Not Enough	Sir Robert King	David Calder	MI6	Deceased
The World Is Not Enough	Dr. Christmas Jones	Denise Richards	Bond girls	Active
The World Is Not Enough	Elektra King	Sophie Marceau		Deceased
The World Is Not Enough	Dr. Molly Warmflash	Serena Scott Thomas	MI6	Active
Die Another Day	Giacinta "Jinx" Johnson	Halle Berry	NSA, Bond girls	Active
Die Another Day	Raoul	Emilio Echevarría	British Intelligence	Active
Die Another Day	Damian Falco	Michael Madsen	National Security Agency NSA	Active
Die Another Day	Mr. Chang	Ho Yi	Chinese Intelligence	Active
Die Another Day	General Moon	Kenneth Tsang	Korean People's Army	Deceased
Casino Royale	Vesper Lynd	Eva Green	HM Treasury	Deceased
Casino Royale	Carter	Joseph Millson	British Intelligence	Active
Casino Royale	Mendel	Ludger Pistor	British Intelligence	Active
Casino Royale	Villers	Tobias Menzies	British Intelligence	Active
Casino Royale	Solange Dimitrios	Caterina Murino	Alex Dimitrios	Deceased
Quantum of Solace	Camille Montes	Olga Kurylenko	Dominic Greene	Active
Quantum of Solace	Strawberry Fields	Gemma Arterton	MI6	Deceased
Quantum of Solace	Foreign Secretary	Tim Pigott-Smith	MI6	Active
Skyfall	Sévérine	Bérénice Marlohe	Raoul Silva	Deceased
Skyfall	Kincade	Albert Finney	Skyfall Estate	Active
Skyfall	Ronson	Bill Buckhurst	British Intelligence	Deceased
No Time to Die	Paloma	Ana de Armas	CIA	Active
No Time to Die	Dr. Vogel	Brigitte Millar	MI6	Active
No Time to Die	Nomi	Lashana Lynch	MI6	Active

(*) Robert Brown also played M in Octopussy, A View to a Kill, The Living Daylights and Licence to Kill. As M's real name and background are not revealed in any of these films, it is possible Brown's M may in fact be Hargreaves.

=== Additional allies ===
Thunderball:

- Major François Derval (played by Paul Stassino)
- Foreign Secretary (played by Roland Culver)
- Sir John (played by Edward Underdown)
- Kenniston (played by Reginald Beckwith)
- Ladislav Kutze (played by George Pravda)
- Group Captain Pritchard (played by Leonard Sachs)

Casino Royale (1967 version):

- Mata Bond (played by Joanna Pettet)
- Sir James Bond's Butler (played by Erik Chitty)
- Captain Carlton-Towers (played by Bernard Cribbins)
- Chinese General (played by Burt Kwouk)
- Cooper (played by Terence Cooper)
- "The Detainer" (played by Daliah Lavi)
- French Legionnaire (played by Jean-Paul Belmondo)
- Le Grand (played by Charles Boyer)
- Agent Mimi/Lady Fiona McTarry (played by Deborah Kerr)
- Ransome (played by William Holden)
- Mr. Slymington-Jones (played by Colin Gordon)
- Smernov (played by Kurt Kasznar)
- Evelyn Tremble (played by Peter Sellers)

Never Say Never Again:

- Nigel Small-Fawcett (played by Rowan Atkinson)
- Lord Ambrose (played by Anthony Sharp)
- Gen. Miler (played by Manning Redwood)
- Nicole (played by Saskia Cohen-Tanugi)
- Capt. Pederson (played by Billy J. Mitchell)

== See also ==
- Outline of James Bond
