= Aki (James Bond) =

- James Bond character
- Akiko Wakabayashi as Aki in You Only Live Twice
- First appearance: You Only Live Twice (1967 film)
- Last appearance: You Only Live Twice (1967 film)
- Created by: Roald Dahl
- Portrayed by: Akiko Wakabayashi

In-universe information
- Gender: Female
- Occupation: Secret agent
- Affiliation: Japanese Secret Service
- Nationality: Japanese
- Classification: Bond girl
- Age: 26
- Status: Deceased

Aki is a fictional character created for the 1967 James Bond film You Only Live Twice. In the film, Aki, played by Akiko Wakabayashi, is a female ninja agent with the fictional Japanese Secret Intelligence Service (SIS).

== Creation ==
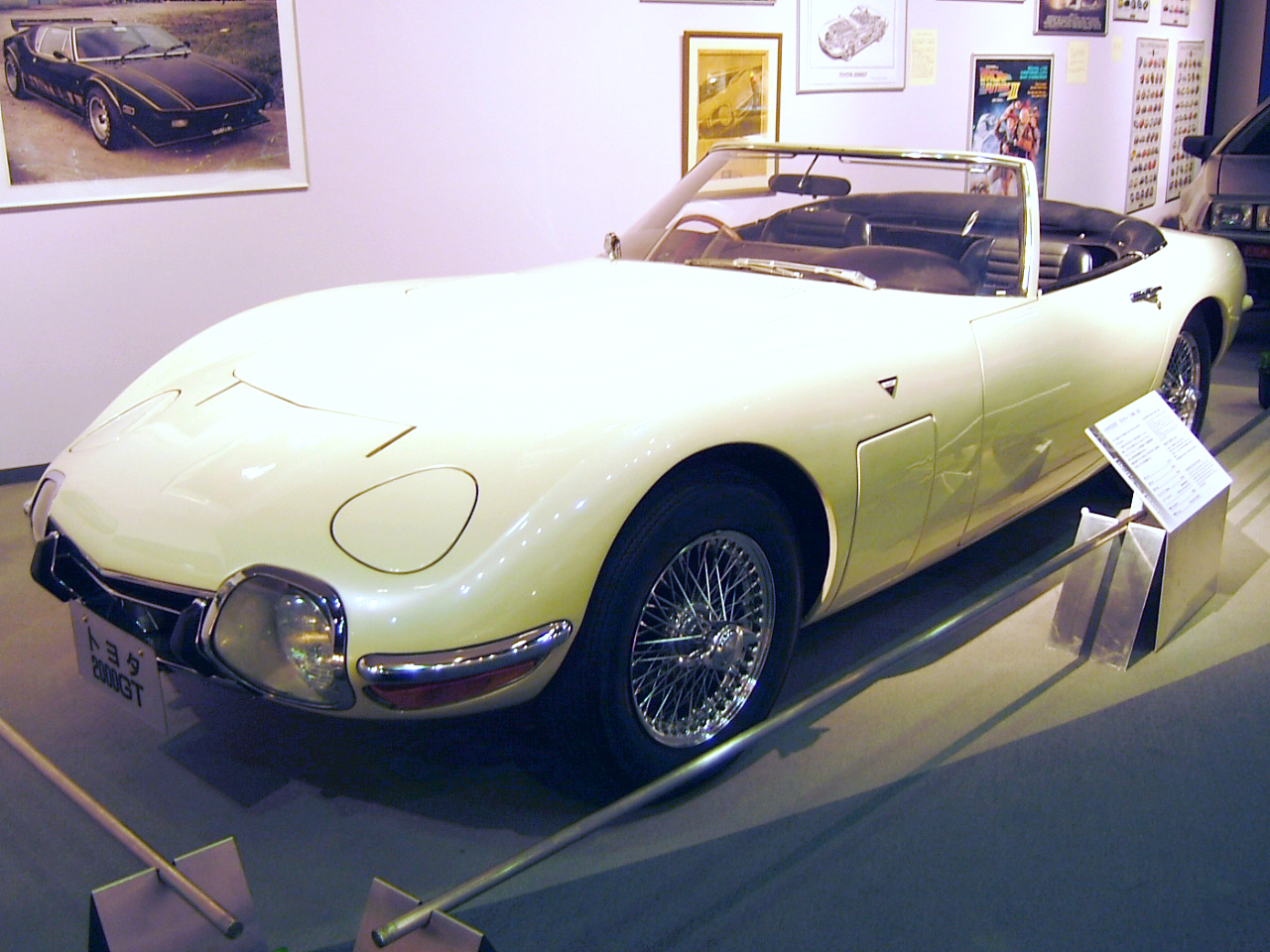
Aki's Toyota 2000GT Open-Top on display at the Toyota Automobile Museum. It was ranked as the seventh best car in the James Bond series by Complex in 2011.

Aki does not appear in Ian Fleming's 1964 novel. She was originally named Suki in Roald Dahl's screenplay. According to The James Bond Films, the character was "Dahl's tribute to the Japanese woman of the Sixties". The character is portrayed as an attractive female Japanese SIS agent, a skilled ninja and an expert driver who often uses her skills at driving her white Toyota 2000GT sports car equipped with several high-tech communication devices.

Mie Hama was cast to play Suki, but she had trouble learning English; to solve the problem, she and Akiko Wakabayashi, originally cast to play the part of almost-silent Kissy Suzuki, decided to swap their respective roles. Wakabayashi then convinced director Lewis Gilbert to change the name of her character to Aki.

== Character ==
Aki is first seen when James Bond 007 (Sean Connery) meets her at a sumo wrestling show. Bond is there to meet a contact who will take him to Dikko Henderson (Charles Gray), M (Bernard Lee)'s recommended contact in Japan. He confirms that Aki is his contact by saying the code words "I love you" to her. Aki takes Bond to meet Henderson in her car. After Henderson is killed during their meeting, Bond attacks and kills one of Henderson's killers. Taking the man's place, he is driven to the Osato Chemical Works HQ, where he is discovered by the villains. Aki rescues him, using her skills as a driver, then takes him to meet her boss, Tiger Tanaka (Tetsurō Tamba). It is after this meeting that a bikini-clad Aki invites Bond to spend the night with her, famously saying "I think I will enjoy very much serving under you", before Bond carries her to bed.

The next morning, Bond returns to the Osato Chemical Works and meets Ernst Stavro Blofeld (Donald Pleasence)'s henchman Mr. Osato (Teru Shimada). Leaving after the meeting, he is pursued by SPECTRE gunmen, from whom Aki rescues him again. The gunmen chase Aki's car and she leads them out into the countryside, where a SIS helicopter lifts the gunmen's car off the road with a giant magnet and drops it into the sea (in 2012, Complex ranked it as the sixth best James Bond chase scene). She then takes him to a quayside to investigate a ship he suspects is being used by the villains. When investigating the ship Bond and Aki are attacked by SPECTRE henchmen. Bond tells her to leave and report to Tanaka; Aki refuses to leave Bond at first, but eventually complies.

Aki next appears after Bond is captured and almost killed by Helga Brandt (Karin Dor), when she meets with him back at Tanaka's headquarters and Bond is about to go on another mission that she cannot accompany him on. When Bond returns to the base in Kyoto, Aki meets him there to discuss the plan to disrupt SPECTRE's plot. She had hoped to play the part of Bond's "wife" in the cover operation, however this was vetoed as she was not a native of the Ama island.

While still in Kyoto, Aki helps Bond assume his Japanese disguise and they spend the night together. While they are sleeping, a ninja assassin (David Toguri) stealthily enters the bedroom and tries to poison Bond by dripping poison down a thread. (Dahl took inspiration for this by watching a similar scene in the first film in the Shinobi no Mono ninja film series.) It is a method often attributed to Ishikawa Goemon. Bond, however, moves in his sleep and Aki, also still sleeping, moves to his position and unwittingly takes the poison instead. Aki starts to breathe heavily and gasp, waking Bond who then kills the assassin. Aki tries to speak but dies before she can say anything. The scene was accompanied by the musical track "The Death of Aki" by John Barry which is included on the film's soundtrack album.

Bond moves on from Aki's death straight away and continues with his ninja training. Soon after he is introduced to Kissy Suzuki (Mie Hama) who had already been chosen to play the part of his cover wife.

== Reception ==
Various lists frequently ranked Aki among the best Bond girls ever, including as tenth by Zimbio in 2008 ("So beautiful you almost forget that Sean Connery has been ridiculously made up to look Japanese. Almost"), ninth by Postmedia News the same year ("Kissy Suzuki is considered the 'main' Bond girl in this film, but Aki has a bigger role and is more memorable"), and eight by WagerWeb in 2009 ("Hot Japanese agent, she kicks ass and looks damn fine doing it. Besides, she dies to save James Bond, you have to give her some extra credit for that"). According to UGO, "although Akiko Wakabayashi is charming in the role, her chemistry with Bond is disappointing, and she lacks both the look and the attitude to make her a good Bond girl," but in another article UGO praised her as "Bond's super-hot guardian angel". Den of Geek included her in their 2008 list of ten James Bond characters who deserve their own spin-off. Esquire magazine dubbed Aki "the Girl Friday of Tiger Tanaka" and "Tiger's Pussycat".
