= Kissy Suzuki =

James Bond character

- James Bond character
- Mie Hama as Kissy Suzuki
- First appearance: You Only Live Twice (novel, 1964)
- Last appearance: You Only Live Twice (film, 1967)
- Created by: Ian Fleming
- Portrayed by: Mie Hama
- Voiced by: Nikki van der Zyl

In-universe information
- Gender: Female
- Occupation: Secret agent
- Affiliation: Japanese Secret Service
- Children: James Suzuki
- Classification: Bond girl / Henchwoman

Kissy Suzuki is a fictional character introduced in Ian Fleming's 1964 James Bond novel, You Only Live Twice and featured in the 1967 film adaptation played by Mie Hama.

Despite James Bond's womanizing, the literary version of Kissy Suzuki remains the only character known who bears a child by Bond: a son named James Suzuki. The treatment of Kissy varies greatly between the novel and the film, where she is much less developed as a character compared to within the novel.

== Novel version ==
In the book You Only Live Twice, Kissy Suzuki is an Ama diver and former Hollywood actress. She is distantly related to a local police superintendent working with Tiger Tanaka, head of the Japanese Secret Service and is, therefore, asked to assist James Bond. Bond stays with Kissy's family on an island near the castle where Ernst Stavro Blofeld maintains a "suicide garden" where people come to die (and are killed by the "gardeners" if they change their mind). Bond is also seeking revenge on Blofeld for the murder of his wife Tracy Bond at the conclusion of the previous novel, On Her Majesty's Secret Service. Bond enters the castle alone, succeeds in killing Blofeld and then destroys the castle.

Bond then sustains amnesia in the aftermath of his attack with Blofeld and is believed dead by his superiors; in reality, he comes to believe he is a fisherman named Tado Todoroki and lives with Kissy for several months. Kissy decides that she will not stop him if he decides to pursue his true identity, but will encourage the cover story that allowed him to stay with her until something else happens. When Bond decides to leave for the Soviet Union, believing the answers to his identity are there, Kissy does not follow; unknown to Bond, she is pregnant with his child.

Kissy Suzuki does not appear again in the Bond canon, and Bond's child is not mentioned again until "Blast From the Past", a short story published in 1996 by Raymond Benson as a direct sequel to You Only Live Twice. In this story, it is revealed that Bond did eventually learn about his child, a son named James Suzuki. After the events of You Only Live Twice, Kissy and James Suzuki moved to the United States, where she raised him. Bond had little involvement in raising James aside from paying for his university education, and Kissy died from ovarian cancer a few years before the story's timeline. At the start of the story, James Suzuki is a young adult living in New York City and working for a Japanese bank. Bond receives a message, apparently from James, asking him to come to New York City on an urgent matter. When Bond arrives, he finds James murdered, having been cut on his arm with a razor blade coated in fugu poison. With the aid of Cheryl Haven, an SIS agent, Bond learns that Irma Bunt, Ernst Stavro Blofeld's henchwoman, killed James Suzuki as revenge for Blofeld's death (again in You Only Live Twice). Bond ultimately kills Bunt, but his victory is hollow; he must live with the loss of James and with the knowledge that he was never a real father to him.

== Film version ==
In the 1967 film adaptation, Kissy (Mie Hama) is one of the ninja agents working for Tiger Tanaka (Tetsurō Tamba). She is introduced shortly after Aki (Akiko Wakabayashi) is killed and is first seen in a mock wedding ceremony as James Bond (Sean Connery) goes undercover, posing as a Japanese fisherman. Bond and Kissy eventually find Ernst Stavro Blofeld (Donald Pleasence)'s secret base, hidden within a volcano and Kissy is sent to alert Tanaka. While swimming to her destination, she is pursued and fired upon by a SPECTRE helicopter, but her experience as a pearl diver enables her to dive underwater and stay there long enough to convince her pursuers that she drowned. After alerting Tanaka, she joins the raid that manages to foil Blofeld's scheme, thereby averting the outbreak of World War III.

In the movie, Kissy is played by Mie Hama. She was originally cast to be played by Akiko Wakabayashi; however, Hama had trouble learning English for the much bigger role of Aki, so the two decided to swap their roles. When Hama became ill during shooting, Sean Connery's wife Diane Cilento doubled for her in the swimming sequence. Her lines were dubbed by Nikki van der Zyl.

== Cultural impact ==
A limited number of Kissy Suzuki dolls were produced in 1967; today, these dolls are valuable on the collector market. Mie Hama also appeared in Playboy magazine in a 1967 nude pictorial "007's Oriental Eyefuls" as the first Asian woman to appear in the magazine, a source of controversy in Japan. Pajiba included Hama on the list of the 15 most embarrassing post-Bond roles for Bond Girls at number seven for King Kong Escapes.

UGO.com offered a mixed review of the character: "Although Mie Hama is attractive in her bikini, this also looks extremely out of place. Similarly inconsistent is her acting, which is charming but forgettable." In another article, UGO called her "sexy yet cute-as-a-kimono." A 2006 retrospective CBS featurette called her "stunning", ranking her as the 23rd best Bond girl. She also placed 18th on the list of the Best Bond girls by LIFE, while Fandango ranked her as 23rd. Yahoo! Movies had her name included in the 2012 list of the best Bond girl names.
