= List of James Bond characters =

List of James Bond characters includes:

- List of James Bond allies
- List of James Bond villains

== See also ==
- James Bond (film character)
- James Bond (literary character)
- James Bond (franchise)
- Outline of James Bond
