= John Beck (producer) =

American film producer

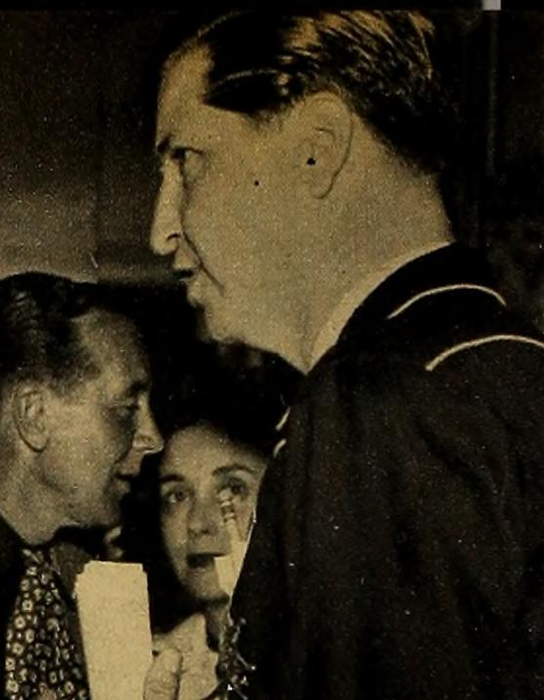
- Beck in 1950
- Born: Jonathan Beck; October 24, 1909; Pomona, California, U.S.
- Died: July 18, 1993 (aged 83); Woodland Hills, Los Angeles, California, U.S.
- Occupation: Film producer

Jonathan Beck was an American film producer in the 1950s and 1960s.

== Career ==
Beck spent his career as a Film producer. Producing such films as One Touch of Venus, Harvey, and Fury at Showdown. He assisted with the merger of Universal Pictures and International Pictures.

In the early 1960s, Willis H. O'Brien (special effects technician of the original 1933 King Kong film) approached Beck about producing a new King Kong film in color, handing over a story outline that O'Brien had written titled King Kong vs. Frankenstein. Beck hired George Worthing Yates to turn O'Brien's outline into a full screenplay, retitled as King Kong vs. Prometheus in reference to the original Mary Shelley novel, and met with several directors. Beck failed to secure funding for the project in Hollywood and reached out overseas until Japanese studio Toho (producers of the Godzilla franchise) expressed interest.

Toho was more interested in acquiring the King Kong character rather than O'Brien's story and as a result, the film was redeveloped as King Kong vs. Godzilla. Beck was granted exclusive distribution rights (theatrical and television) for the United States, Canada, Alaska, the United Kingdom, and Israel, while Toho retained exclusive distribution for the Far East, as well as rights to produce his own version of the film. Beck produced a localized version with new footage and repurposed stock music and sold his version to Universal International, who made a deal to retain copyrights to the American version for 40 years. Beck's deal with Toho was done without O'Brien's knowledge or consent and as a result, O'Brien attempted to sue Beck but dropped his lawsuit due to mounting attorney fees.

The last film Beck produced was The Private Navy of Sgt. O'Farrell. Afterwards, he worked on lesser known projects, and he later died of cancer on July 18, 1993, at the age of 83.
