= Samurai Pirate =

- Theatrical release poster
- Directed by: Senkichi Taniguchi
- Screenplay by: Takeshi Kimura; Shinichi Sekizawa
- Story by: Kikuo Yasumi
- Produced by: Tomoyuki Tanaka; Kenichiro Tsunoda
- Starring: Toshiro Mifune; Ichirō Arishima; Mie Hama; Kumi Mizuno
- Cinematography: Takao Saito
- Edited by: Yoshitami Kuroiwa
- Music by: Masaru Sato
- Production company: Toho
- Distributed by: Toho
- Release date: October 26, 1963 (Japan)
- Running time: 96 minutes
- Country: Japan
- Language: Japanese
- Box office: ¥230 million

Samurai Pirate (Japanese: 大盗賊, Hepburn: Daitōzoku; lit. 'The Great Thief') is a 1963 Japanese drama action film directed by Senkichi Taniguchi, with special effects by Eiji Tsuburaya. The film stars Toshiro Mifune and Mie Hama.

The film is often confused with the theme of fantasy instead of tokusatsu, but the book Toho Special Effects All Monster Encyclopedia specifically identifies it in the genre of tokusatsu fantasy. The film was released in the United States by American International Pictures as The Lost World of Sinbad.

== Cast ==
- Toshiro Mifune as Sukezaemon Naya/Sinbad
- Makoto Sato as the Black Pirate
- Jun Funato as Ming, the Prince of Thailand
- Ichiro Arishima as Sennin the Wizard
- Mie Hama as Princess Yaya
- Kumi Mizuno as Miwa
- Akiko Wakabayashi as Yaya's maid

== Production ==
The film was based on a screenplay by Takeshi Kimura and Shinichi Sekizawa which was based on a treatment by Toshio Yasumi.

== Release ==
Samurai Pirate was distributed theatrically in Japan by Toho on October 26, 1963. The film was Toho's third highest-grossing film in Japan in 1963 and the 10th highest grossing in the USA.

An English dubbed version, produced by Titra Studios, was distributed by American International Pictures in the United States as The Lost World of Sinbad. The film was released as a double feature in the United States with War of the Zombies on March 17, 1965. It was released in the United Kingdom in 1976.

== See also ==
- List of Japanese films of 1963
