= Akiko (film) =

1961 film

- Directed by: Luigi Filippo D'Amico
- Written by: Gaspare Cataldo; Luigi Filippo D'Amico; Ernesto Gastaldi; Ugo Guerra
- Starring: Akiko Wakabayashi
- Cinematography: Alfio Contini
- Edited by: Jolanda Benvenuti
- Music by: Teo Usuelli
- Release date: 1961
- Running time: 95 minute
- Country: Italy
- Language: Italian

Akiko is a 1961 Italian comedy film written and directed by Luigi Filippo D'Amico.

== Plot ==
In Rome, Mrs. Ottavia Colasanto has not had news of her husband since he went to Japan eighteen years ago. She is considered practically a widow. One day, a very beautiful young Japanese girl arrives. She notifies the Colasanto family that she is the biological daughter of Ottavia's (presumably) deceased husband.

== Cast ==
- Akiko Wakabayashi as Akiko
- Pierre Brice as Duilio
- Marisa Merlini as Ottavia Colasanto
- Memmo Carotenuto as Armando Piffero
- Vicky Ludovisi as Anita Colasanto
- Valeria Fabrizi as Tosca
- Andrea Checchi as Sor Egisto
- Marcello Paolini as Serse Colasanto
- Giacomo Furia as Peppe, aka "Er Campanaro"
- Giuseppe Chinnici as the commissioner
- Mario Meniconi as the referee in the ring
- Paolo Ferrari as "Terzo Braccio"
- Paolo Panelli as Felice
- Carlo Taranto
- Giancarlo Zarfati as little boy asking for a cigarette
- Francesco Sormano
- Ettore Zamperini
- Luigi Moneta
- Roberto Ceccacci
- Nino Fuscagni
