= Kokusai himitsu keisatsu: Kagi no kagi =

1965 Japanese comedy-spy film

- Theatrical release poster
- Directed by: Senkichi Taniguchi
- Written by: Hideo Ando
- Produced by: Shin Morita; Tomoyuki Tanaka
- Starring: Tatsuya Mihashi; Akiko Wakabayashi; Mie Hama; Tadao Nakamaru; Susumu Kurobe; Sachio Sakai; Hideyo Amamoto; Tetsu Nakamura; Akemi Kita
- Cinematography: Kazuo Yamada
- Music by: Sadao Bekku
- Distributed by: Toho
- Release date: October 23, 1965 (Japan)
- Running time: 93 minutes
- Country: Japan
- Language: Japanese

Kokusai himitsu keisatsu: Kagi no kagi (Japanese: 国際秘密警察 鍵の鍵; International Secret Police: Key of Keys), also known as Key of Keys, is a 1965 Japanese comedy-spy film directed by Senkichi Taniguchi. It is the fourth installment in the Kokusai himitsu keisatsu series, a parody of James Bond-style spy movies.

Woody Allen used footage from Kokusai himitsu keisatsu: Kayaku no taru (Japanese: 国際秘密警察:火薬の樽; International Secret Police: Keg of Gunpowder), the third installment, along with Key of Keys, for his directorial debut, What's Up, Tiger Lily? (1966). In the Woody Allen film, the original dialogue is redubbed in English, transforming the plot into a comedic story centered around a secret egg salad recipe.

== Plot ==
In Tonwan, where he infiltrated, Kitami received a request from Suritai, the country's intelligence chief, to steal a large sum of hidden funds from Gegeng, the leader of the anti-government guerrilla group called Yami. Kitami, along with Meichin and Shiran, arrived in Japan to track down Gegeng's gang, which profited from illegal gambling and prostitution. They joined forces with Cai, a gangster who was enraged by Gegeng's encroachment on their Yokohama territory. Disguised and aboard their ship, they aimed to seize Gegeng's funds but were met with a surprise—instead of cash, they discovered a coded message on a piece of paper.

== Cast ==
- Tatsuya Mihashi as Agent Jiro Kitami
- Susumu Kurobe as He-Qing Cai (Triad boss)
- Tadao Nakamaru as Gegen (Chief of the rebel guerrilla association "Darkness")
- Mie Hama as Mi Chen (Tonwanian spy)
- Akiko Wakabayashi as White Orchid (Safe-cracking thief)
- Tetsu Nakamura as Suritai (Director of National Intelligence)
- Shoji Oki as Dorodo (Gegen's minion)
- Sachio Sakai as Inagawa (Cai's minion)
- Eisei Amamoto as Ikeguchi (Cai's minion)
- Monica Bead as Barro
- Akemi Kita as Yoko (Call girl)
- Nadao Kirno as Cho (Tonwan Army Officer)
- Koji Iwamoto as Ton Won man 1
- Toru Ibuki as Ton Won man 2
- Koji Uruki as Ton Won man 3
- J. Jones as White Caucasian woman
- Seiji Ikeda
- Hiroshi Akitsu
- Akira Kishoji
