= King Kong vs. Godzilla =

1962 film directed by Ishirō Honda

- Theatrical release poster

Japanese name
- Kanji: キングコング対ゴジラ
Transcriptions
- Revised Hepburn: Kingu Kongu tai Gojira
- Directed by: Ishirō Honda
- Special effects by: Eiji Tsuburaya
- Written by: Shinichi Sekizawa
- Produced by: Tomoyuki Tanaka
- Starring: Shoichi Hirose; Haruo Nakajima; Tadao Takashima; Kenji Sahara; Yū Fujiki; Ichirō Arishima; Mie Hama
- Cinematography: Hajime Koizumi
- Edited by: Reiko Kaneko
- Music by: Akira Ifukube
- Production company: Toho Co., Ltd
- Distributed by: Toho
- Release date: August 11, 1962 (Japan)
- Running time: 97 minutes
- Country: Japan
- Languages: Japanese; English
- Budget: $432,000 (Note: The Japanese version cost ¥150 million ($420,000), while the American version reportedly cost an additional $12,000.)
- Box office: $8.7 million (est.)

King Kong vs. Godzilla (Japanese: キングコング対ゴジラ, Hepburn: Kingu Kongu tai Gojira) is a 1962 Japanese kaiju film directed by Ishirō Honda, with special effects by Eiji Tsuburaya. Produced and distributed by Toho Co., Ltd, it is the third film in both the Godzilla and King Kong franchises, as well as the first Toho-produced film featuring King Kong. It is also the first time that each character appeared on film in color and widescreen. The film stars Shoichi Hirose as King Kong and Haruo Nakajima as Godzilla with Tadao Takashima, Kenji Sahara, Yū Fujiki, Ichirō Arishima, and Mie Hama playing other prominent roles. In the film, Godzilla is reawakened by an American submarine and a pharmaceutical company captures King Kong for promotional uses, culminating in a battle on Mount Fuji.

The project began with a story outline devised by King Kong stop motion animator Willis O'Brien around 1960, in which Kong battles a giant Frankenstein's monster; O'Brien gave the outline to producer John Beck for development. Behind O'Brien's back and without his knowledge, Beck gave the project to Toho to produce the film, replacing the giant Frankenstein's monster with Godzilla and scrapping O'Brien's original story.

King Kong vs. Godzilla was released theatrically in Japan on August 11, 1962, and grossed ¥352 million, making it the second-highest-grossing Japanese film in history upon its release. The film remains the most attended Godzilla film in Japan to date, and is credited with encouraging Toho to prioritize the continuation of the Godzilla series after seven years of dormancy. A heavily re-edited "Americanized" version of the film was released theatrically in the United States by Universal International Inc. on June 26, 1963 as Universal's first King Kong film, the second being King Kong Escapes on June 19, 1968, and the third being the second remake of the 1933 film on December 14, 2005.

The film was followed by Mothra vs. Godzilla, released on April 29, 1964.

== Plot ==
Mr. Tako, head of Pacific Pharmaceutical, is frustrated with the television shows his company is sponsoring and wants something to boost his ratings. When a doctor tells Tako about a giant monster he discovered on the small Faro Island, Tako believes that it would be a brilliant idea to use the monster to gain publicity. Tako sends two men, Osamu Sakurai and Kinsaburo Furue, to find and bring back the monster. Meanwhile, the United Nations nuclear submarine Seahawk gets caught in an iceberg. The iceberg collapses, unleashing Godzilla, who had been trapped within it since 1955. (Note: As depicted in Godzilla Raids Again (1955)) Godzilla destroys the submarine and makes its way towards Japan, attacking a military base as it journeys southward.

On Faro Island, a gigantic octopus crawls ashore and attacks the native village in search of Farolacton juice, taken from a species of red berry native to the island. The mysterious Faro monster, revealed to be King Kong, arrives and defeats the octopus. Kong drinks several vases full of the juice while the islanders perform a ceremony, which causes him to fall asleep. Sakurai and Furue place Kong on a large raft and begin to transport him back to Japan. Mr. Tako arrives on the ship transporting Kong, but a JSDF ship stops them and orders that Kong must be kept out of Japan. Meanwhile, Godzilla arrives in Japan and terrorizes the countryside. Kong wakes up and breaks free from the raft. Reaching the mainland, Kong confronts Godzilla and proceeds to throw giant rocks at Godzilla. Godzilla is not fazed by King Kong's rock attack and uses its heat ray to burn him. Kong retreats after realizing that he is not yet ready to take on Godzilla.

The JSDF digs a large pit laden with explosives and poison gas and lures Godzilla into it, but Godzilla is unharmed. They next string up a barrier of power lines around the city filled with 1,000,000 volts of electricity, which proves effective against Godzilla. Kong approaches Tokyo and tears through the power lines, feeding off the electricity, which seems to make Kong stronger. Kong then enters Tokyo and captures Fumiko, Sakurai's sister, taking her to the National Diet Building which he then scales. The JSDF launches capsules full of vaporised Farolacton juice, which puts Kong to sleep, and rescue Fumiko. The JSDF decides to transport Kong via balloons to Godzilla, in hopes that they will kill each other.

The next morning, Kong is deployed by helicopters next to Godzilla at the summit of Mount Fuji and the two engage in battle. Godzilla initially has the advantage, dazing Kong with a devastating dropkick and repeated tail blows to his head. Godzilla attempts to burn Kong to death by using its atomic breath to set fire to the foliage around Kong's body. A bolt of lightning from thunder clouds strikes Kong, reviving him and charging him up, and the battle resumes. Godzilla and King Kong fight their way down the mountain and into Atami, where the two monsters destroy Atami Castle while trading blows, before falling off a cliff together into Sagami Bay. After a brief underwater battle, only Kong resurfaces from the water, and he swims back toward his home island. There is no sign of Godzilla, but the JSDF speculates that it may have survived.

== Cast ==
=== Japanese version ===
- Shoichi Hirose as King Kong
- Haruo Nakajima as Godzilla
  - Katsumi Tezuka as Godzilla (assistant)
- Tadao Takashima as Osamu Sakurai
- Kenji Sahara (Note: Miscredited as "Keji Sahaka" in the American version of the film.) as Kazuo Fujita
- Yū Fujiki as Kinsaburo Furue
- Ichirō Arishima as Mr. Tako
- Mie Hama as Fumiko Sakurai
- Jun Tazaki as General Masami Shinzo
- Akiko Wakabayashi as Tamie
- Akihiko Hirata as Defense Minister Shigezawa
- Somesho Matsumoto (Note: Sometimes miscredited as "Somekichi Matsumoto.") as Dr. Ohnuki
- Akemi Negishi as Chikiro's mother, Faro Island native
- Senkichi Omura as Konno, TTV Translator
- Sachio Sakai as Obayashi, Mr. Tako's assistant
- Haruya Kato as Obayashi's assistant
- Yoshio Kosugi as Faro Island chief
- Yoshifumi Tajima as ship captain
- Harold S. Conway as a researcher on Seahawk
- Osman Yusuf as a researcher on Seahawk

=== American version ===
- Michael Keith as Eric Carter, U.N. reporter
- Harry Holcombe as Dr. Arnold Johnson
- James Yagi as Yutaka Omura
- Les Tremayne as Narrator, General Shinzo, various characters (voice dubbing)
- Paul Mason as Misc. characters (voice dubbing)
- Bruce Howard as Misc. characters (voice dubbing)

Cast taken from Japan's Favorite Mon-Star, except where cited otherwise.

== Production ==
=== Crew ===
- Ishirō Honda (Note: Miscredited as "Inoshiro Honda" in the American version of the film.) – director
- Eiji Tsuburaya – special effects director
- Kōji Kajita – assistant director
- Toshio Takashima – lighting
- Takeo Kita – art director
- Teruaki Abe – art director
- Akira Watanabe – special effects art director
- Kuichirō Kishida – special effects lighting
- Masao Fujiyoshi – sound recording

==== American version ====
- Thomas Montgomery – director
- John Beck – producer
- Paul Mason – writer
- Bruce Howard – writer
- Peter Zinner – editorial and music supervision

Personnel taken from Japan's Favorite Mon-Star.

=== Conception ===
A painting done by Willis O'Brien for the proposed King Kong Meets Frankenstein. The project evolved into King Kong vs. Godzilla, with Godzilla replacing the giant Frankenstein's monster as King Kong's opponent.

King Kong vs. Godzilla had its roots in an earlier concept for a new King Kong feature developed by Willis O'Brien, animator of the original stop-motion Kong. Around 1960, O'Brien came up with a proposed treatment, King Kong Meets Frankenstein, where Kong would fight against a giant Frankenstein's monster in San Francisco. O'Brien took the project (which consisted of some concept art and a screenplay treatment) to RKO to secure permission to use the King Kong character. During this time, the story was renamed King Kong vs. the Ginko when it was believed that Universal had the rights to the Frankenstein name. O'Brien was introduced to producer John Beck, who promised to find a studio to make the film (at this point, RKO was no longer a production company). Beck took the story treatment and hired George Worthing Yates to write the screenplay for the film. The story was slightly altered and the title changed to King Kong vs. Prometheus, returning the name to the original Frankenstein concept (The Modern Prometheus is the subtitle to the original novel).

The November 2, 1960 issue of Variety reported that Beck had even asked a filmmaker named Jerry Guran (a possible misspelling of filmmaker Nathan Juran's pseudonym Jerry Juran) to direct the film. However, the cost of stop-motion animation discouraged potential studios from putting the film into production. After shopping the script around overseas, Beck eventually attracted the interest of the Japanese studio Toho, which had long wanted to make a King Kong film. (Note: According to special effects director Teruyoshi Nakano, Tomoyuki Tanaka and Eiji Tsuburaya wanted to make a King Kong film for Toho as early as 1954 because he was "world-famous".) After purchasing the script, they decided to replace the giant Frankenstein's monster with Godzilla to be King Kong's opponent and would have Shinichi Sekizawa rewrite Yates' script. (Note: The concept of a giant Frankenstein Monster would be used later by Toho in Frankenstein Conquers the World (1965) and its sequel The War of the Gargantuas (1966). O'Brien, however, was never credited for the concept.) The studio thought that it would be the perfect way to celebrate its 30th year in production. It was one of five big banner releases for the company to celebrate the anniversary alongside Sanjuro, Chūshingura, Lonely Lane, and Born in Sin.

John Beck's dealings with Willis O'Brien's project were done behind his back, and O'Brien was never credited for his idea. O'Brien attempted to sue Beck, but lacked the money to do so, and on November 8, 1962, he died in his home in Los Angeles at the age of 76. O'Brien's wife Darlyne later cited "the frustration of the King Kong vs. Frankenstein deal" as the cause of his death. Merian C. Cooper, the producer and co-director of the 1933 King Kong film, was bitterly opposed to the project, stating in a letter addressed to his friend Douglas Burden, "I was indignant when some Japanese company made a belittling thing, to a creative mind, called King Kong vs. Godzilla. I believe they even stooped so low as to use a man in a gorilla suit, which I have spoken out against so often in the early days of King Kong".

In 1963, he filed a lawsuit to enjoin distribution of the movie against John Beck, as well as Toho and Universal (the film's U.S. copyright holder) claiming that he outright owned the King Kong character, but the lawsuit never went through, as it turned out he was not Kong's sole legal owner as he had previously believed.

=== Themes ===
Director Ishirō Honda wanted the theme of the movie to be a satire of the television industry in Japan. In April 1962, TV networks and their various sponsors started producing outrageous programming and publicity stunts to grab audiences' attention after two elderly viewers reportedly died at home while watching a violent wrestling match on TV.

The various rating wars between the networks and banal programming that followed this event caused widespread debate over how TV would affect Japanese culture with Sōichi Ōya stating TV was creating "a nation of 100 million idiots". Honda stated "People were making a big deal out of ratings, but my own view of TV shows was that they did not take the viewer seriously, that they took the audience for granted...so I decided to show that through my movie" and "the reason I showed the monster battle through the prism of a ratings war was to depict the reality of the times".

Honda addressed this by having a pharmaceutical company sponsor a TV show and going to extremes for a publicity stunt for ratings by capturing a giant monster stating "All a medicine company would have to do is just produce good medicines you know? But the company doesn't think that way. They think they will get ahead of their competitors if they use a monster to promote their product." Honda would work with screenwriter Shinichi Sekizawa on developing the story stating that "Back then Sekizawa was working on pop songs and TV shows so he really had a clear insight into television". Sekizawa remembered the excitement about the project stating "I remember thinking, I might get to write about that guy who climbed the Empire State Building."

=== Filming ===
The excitement about making a King Kong movie in Japan was much greater than making a new Godzilla film.

— Special Effects crew member Koichi Kawakita.

Special effects director Eiji Tsuburaya was planning on working on other projects at this point in time such as a new version of a fairy tale film script called Princess Kaguya, but he postponed those to work on this project with Toho instead since he was such a huge fan of King Kong. He stated in an early 1960s interview with the Mainichi Newspaper, "But my movie company has produced a very interesting script that combined King Kong and Godzilla, so I couldn't help working on this instead of my other fantasy films. The script is special to me; it makes me emotional because it was King Kong that got me interested in the world of special photographic techniques when I saw it in 1933."

Early drafts of the script were sent back with notes from the studio asking that the monster antics be made as "funny as possible". This comical approach was embraced by Tsuburaya, who wanted to appeal to children's sensibilities and broaden the genre's audience. Much of the monster battle was filmed to contain a great deal of humor but the approach was not favoured by most of the effects crew, who "couldn't believe" some of the things Tsuburaya asked them to do, such as Kong and Godzilla volleying a giant boulder back and forth. With the exception of the next film, Mothra vs. Godzilla, this film began the trend to portray Godzilla and the monsters with more and more anthropomorphism as the series progressed, to appeal more to younger children. Ishirō Honda was not a fan of the dumbing down of the monsters. Years later, Honda stated in an interview. "I don't think a monster should ever be a comical character," and "The public is more entertained when the great King Kong strikes fear into the hearts of the little characters." Honda also believed that if Godzilla acted like a human, it showed off the fact that it was a man in a suit. The decision was also taken to shoot the film in a (2.35:1) scope ratio (TohoScope) and to film in color (Eastman Color), marking both monsters' first widescreen and color portrayals.

Toho originally planned to shoot the film on location in Sri Lanka, but abandoned the idea after being forced to pay RKO roughly ¥80 million ($220,000) for the rights to the King Kong character, which forced the company to scale down their original production costs. The bulk of the film was shot on the Japanese island of Izu Ōshima instead. The movie's production budget came out to ¥150 million ($420,000).

Suit actors Shoichi Hirose (as King Kong) and Haruo Nakajima (as Godzilla) were given mostly free rein by Tsuburaya to choreograph their own moves. The men would rehearse for hours and would base their moves on those of professional wrestling (a sport that was growing in popularity in Japan), in particular the moves of Toyonobori.

During pre-production, Tsuburaya toyed with the idea of using Willis O'Brien's stop-motion technique instead of the suitmation process used in the first two Godzilla films, but budgetary concerns prevented him from using the process, and the more cost-efficient suitmation was used instead. However, some brief stop-motion was used in a couple of quick sequences. Two of these sequences were animated by Minoru Nakano.

Eiji Tsuburaya directs Shoichi Hirose (in the King Kong suit) and Haruo Nakajima (in the Godzilla suit) on the Mount Fuji set during filming.

A brand new Godzilla suit was designed for this film and some slight alterations were done to its overall appearance. These alterations included the removal of its tiny ears, three toes on each foot rather than four, enlarged central dorsal fins, and a bulkier body. These new features gave Godzilla a more reptilian/dinosaurian appearance. Outside of the suit, a meter-high model and a small puppet were also built. Another puppet (from the waist up) was also designed that had a nozzle in the mouth to spray out liquid mist simulating Godzilla's atomic breath. However the shots in the film where this prop was employed (far away shots of Godzilla breathing its atomic breath during its attack on the Arctic Military base) were ultimately cut from the film. These cut scenes can be seen in the Japanese theatrical trailer. Finally, a separate prop of Godzilla's tail was also built for close-up practical shots when its tail would be used (such as the scene where Godzilla trips Kong with its tail). The tail prop would be swung offscreen by a stagehand.

Sadamasa Arikawa (who worked with Tsuburaya) said that the sculptors had a hard time coming up with a King Kong suit that appeased Tsuburaya. The first suit was rejected for being too fat with long legs giving Kong what the crew considered an almost cute look. A few other designs were done before Tsuburaya would approve the final look that was ultimately used in the film. The suit's body design was a team effort by brothers Koei Yagi and Kanji Yagi and was covered with expensive yak hair, which Eizō Kaimai hand-dyed brown.

Because RKO instructed that the face must be different from the original's design, sculptor Teizō Toshimitsu based Kong's face on the Japanese macaque rather than a gorilla, and designed two separate masks. As well, two separate pairs of arms were also created. One pair were extended arms operated by poles inside the suit to give Kong a gorilla-like illusion, while the other pair were at normal arms-length and featured gloves that were used for scenes that required Kong to grab items and wrestle with Godzilla. Suit actor Hirose was sewn into the suit in order to hide the zipper. This would force him to be trapped inside the suit for large amounts of time and would cause him much physical discomfort. In the scene where Kong drinks the berry juice and falls asleep, he was trapped in the suit for three hours. Besides the suit with the two separate arm attachments, a meter-high model and a puppet of Kong (used for closeups) were also built. As well, a huge prop of Kong's hand was built for the scene where he grabs Mie Hama (Fumiko) and carries her off.

For the attack of the giant octopus, four live octopuses were used. They were forced to move among the miniature huts by having hot air blown onto them. After the filming of that scene was finished, three of the four octopuses were released. The fourth became special effects director Tsuburaya's dinner. These sequences were filmed on a miniature set outdoors on the Miura Coast, According to assistant special effects cinematographer Kōichi Kawakita, the crew had difficulty getting the live octopuses to move. Along with the live animals, two rubber octopus puppets were built, with the larger one being covered with plastic wrap to simulate mucous. Some stop-motion tentacles were also created for the scene where the octopus grabs a native and tosses him. These sequences were shot indoors at Toho's studios.

The special effects crew filmed a sequence in which Godzilla rampages through Takasaki, Gunma Prefecture, and destroys the Takasaki Kannon Statue, but this scene was cut from the final film. Despite this scene being cut, Godzilla is still said to have passed through Takasaki in the film.

Since King Kong was seen as the bigger draw and Godzilla was still considered a 'villain' at this point in the series, the decision was made to not only give King Kong top billing (Note: Shinichi Sekizawa also stated that the studio wanted to give King Kong top billing "To honor the American star".) but also to present him as the winner of the climactic fight. While the ending of the film does look somewhat ambiguous, Toho confirmed that King Kong was indeed the winner in their 1962–63 English-language film program Toho Films Vol. 8, which states in the film's plot synopsis, "A spectacular duel is arranged on the summit of Mt. Fuji and King Kong is victorious. But after he has won..." While producer Tomoyuki Tanaka stated in a pair of books he wrote in the 1980s that he believed the battle ended in a draw, Toho still maintains that Kong was the victor on their global website in 2023.

== Release ==
=== Theatrical ===
King Kong vs. Godzilla was released in Japan by Toho on August 11, 1962, where it played alongside Myself and I for two weeks, afterward, it was extended by one more week and screened alongside the anime film Touring the World. The film was re-released twice as part of the Toho Champion Festival, a children's festival centered on marathon screenings of kaiju films and cartoons. The film was first heavily re-cut and screened at the festival on March 21, 1970, and again on March 19, 1977, to coincide with the Japanese release of the 1976 version of King Kong. The 1970 Champion Festival version was edited by the film’s director Ishirō Honda, who shortened the runtime to just 74 minutes. In 1983, the film was screened across Japan alongside 9 other kaiju films as part of the Godzilla 1983 Revival Festival. The festival's success became the catalyst for relaunching the Godzilla series with The Return of Godzilla.

In North America, King Kong vs. Godzilla premiered in New York City on June 26, 1963. The film was also released in many international markets. In Germany, it was known as Die Rückkehr des King Kong ("The Return of King Kong") and in Italy as Il trionfo di King Kong ("The Triumph of King Kong").

To celebrate the film's 50th anniversary, Bay Area Film Events (BAFE) planned to screen the film at the Historic BAL Theatre in San Leandro, California, on June 16, 2012, as a double feature with Godzilla, Mothra and King Ghidorah: Giant Monsters All-Out Attack.

=== American version ===
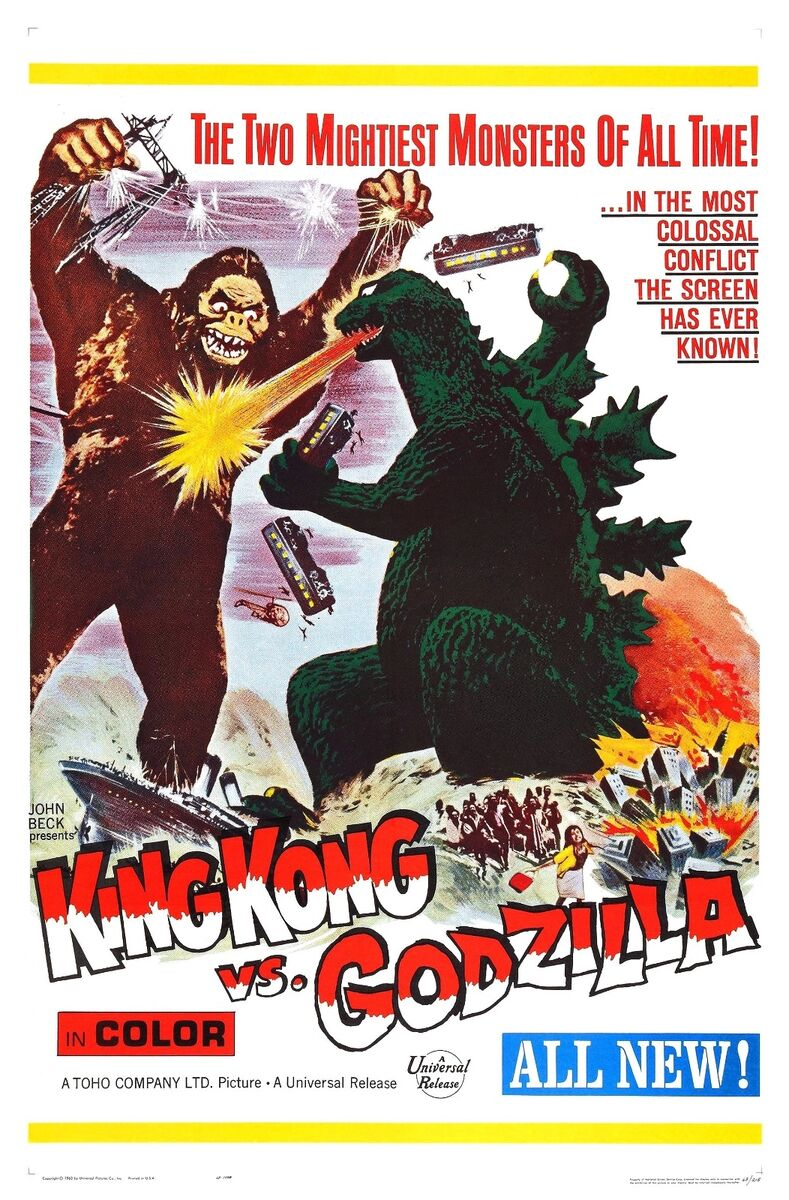
Theatrical poster for the U.S. release of the film by Universal-International. The American version made several alterations to the original involving scenes, actors, and music.

When John Beck sold the King Kong vs Prometheus script to Toho (which became King Kong vs. Godzilla), he was given exclusive rights to produce a version of the film for release in non-Asian territories. He was able to line up a couple of potential distributors in Warner Bros. and Universal-International even before the film began production. Beck, accompanied by two Warner Bros. representatives, attended at least two private screenings of the film on the Toho Studios lot before it was released in Japan.

John Beck enlisted the help of two Hollywood writers, Paul Mason and Bruce Howard, to write a new screenplay. After discussions with Beck, the two wrote the American version and worked with editor Peter Zinner to remove scenes, recut others, and change the sequence of several events. To give the film more of an American feel, Mason and Howard decided to insert new footage that would convey the impression that the film was actually a newscast. The television actor Michael Keith played newscaster Eric Carter, a United Nations reporter who spends much of the time commenting on the action from the U.N. Headquarters via an International Communications Satellite (ICS) broadcast. Harry Holcombe was cast as Dr. Arnold Johnson, the head of the Museum of Natural History in New York City, who tries to explain Godzilla's origin and his and Kong's motivations.

Beck and his crew were able to obtain library music from a host of older films, including Creature from the Black Lagoon (1954). Cues from these scores were used to almost completely replace the original Japanese score by Akira Ifukube and give the film a more Western sound. They also obtained stock footage from the film The Mysterians from RKO (the film's U.S. copyright holder at the time) which was used not only to represent the ICS, but which was also utilized during the film's climax. Stock footage of a massive earthquake from The Mysterians was employed to make the earthquake caused by Kong and Godzilla's plummet into the ocean much more violent than the comparatively tame tremor seen in the Japanese version. This added footage features massive tidal waves, flooded valleys, and the ground splitting open swallowing up various huts.

Beck spent roughly $12,000 making his English version and sold the film to Universal-International for roughly $200,000 on April 29, 1963. The film was released theatrically in the United States on June 26 of that year, as a double feature with The Traitors.

Starting in 1963, Toho's international sales booklets began advertising an English dub of King Kong vs. Godzilla alongside Toho-commissioned, unedited international dubs of movies such as Varan the Unbelievable and The Last War. By association, it is thought that this King Kong vs. Godzilla dub is an unedited English-language international version not known to have been released on home video.

=== Home media ===
In July 2014, the Japanese version was released for the first time on Blu-ray in Japan as part of Toho's plan to release the entire series on the Blu-ray format for Godzilla's 60th anniversary. Universal Pictures released the English-language version of the film on Blu-ray on April 1, 2014, along with King Kong Escapes. The Blu-ray sold $738,063 in domestic video sales. In 2019, the Japanese and American versions were included in a Blu-ray box set released by The Criterion Collection, which included all 15 films from the franchise's Shōwa era. The 4K remaster of the Japanese version was released on Blu-ray and 4K Blu-ray in May 2021. The special features for the 2021 Blu-ray include one of the Toho Champion Festival reissues of the film, the film's theatrical trailer, and a still gallery.

== Reception ==
=== Box office ===
In Japan, this film has the highest box office attendance figures of all of the Godzilla films to date. It sold 11.2 million tickets during its initial theatrical run, accumulating ¥352 million ($972,000) in distribution rental earnings. The film became the second-highest-grossing Japanese-produced film in history upon its release and was the fourth-highest-grossing film released in Japan that year as well as Toho's second-biggest release. At an average 1962 Japanese ticket price, 11.2 million ticket sales were equivalent to estimated gross receipts of approximately ¥1.29 billion ($3.58 million). Haruo Nakajima recalled how he and Shoichi Hirose were given bonuses for their work stating, "It was the one and only time that they gave us a bonus. The film was that big of a hit".

Including re-releases, the film accumulated a lifetime figure of 12.55 million tickets sold in Japan, with distribution rental earnings of ¥430 million. The 1970 re-release sold 870,000 tickets, equivalent to estimated gross receipts of approximately ¥280 million ($780,000). The 1977 re-release sold 480,000 tickets, equivalent to estimated gross receipts of approximately ¥440 million ($1.64 million). This adds up to total estimated Japanese gross receipts of approximately ¥2 billion ($6 million). In the United States, the film grossed $2.7 million, accumulating a profit (via rentals) of $1.25 million. Overall, the film is estimated to have earned $8,700,000 worldwide.

=== Critical response ===
On the review aggregator website Rotten Tomatoes, 52% of 21 critics' reviews are positive, with an average rating of 5.1/10. Metacritic, which uses a weighted average, assigned the film a score of 40 out of 100, based on 4 critics, indicating "mixed or average" reviews.

The reviews tended to evaluate the film as an exploitation or children's film. Some of the more positive reviews were from James Powers of The Hollywood Reporter who wrote "A funny monster picture? That's what Universal has in "King Kong Versus Godzilla [sic]". Audiences which patronize this kind of picture will eat it up. It should be a big success via the multiple booking, exploitation route." While the review from Box Office stated "Exploitation-minded exhibitors should have a field day with this Japanese import. While the story is preposterous and loaded with stilted dialogue...the special effects are unusual and merit considerable praise". John Cutts of Films and Filming wrote "Sublime stuff. Richly comic, briskly paced, oddly touching, and thoroughly irresistible. Outrageous of course, and deplorably acted and atrociously dubbed to boot. But what matters most is the sheer invention of its exemplary trick work."

The review from Variety stated "To the list of this century's great preliminary bouts—Dempsey-Firpo, Sullivan-Paar, Nixon-Kennedy, Paterson-Liston, Steve Reeves-Gordon Scott—add the main event "King Kong Versus Godzilla [sic]". From the mysterious East comes the monstrosity to end all monstrosities, the epic clash between the 30-year-old, breast-beating, Hollywood-born-and-bred gorilla with the overactive pituitary and the seven-year-old, pea-brained, flame-throated, tail-wagging cross between a Stegosaurus and a Tyrannosaurus rex who fights out of Tokyo, Japan. Onward and upward with the arts". While Eugene Archer of The New York Times said "King Kong Versus Godzilla [sic] should be explicit enough title for anyone. Viewers who attend the ridiculous melodrama unveiled at neighborhood theaters should know exactly what to expect and get what they deserve. The one real surprise of this cheap reprise of earlier Hollywood and Japanese horror films is the ineptitude of its fakery. When the pair of prehistoric monsters finally get together for their battle royal, the effect is nothing more than a couple of dressed-up stuntmen throwing cardboard rocks at each other."

Den of Geek ranked the film at number eight in their 2019 ranking of the Shōwa Godzilla films, writing that the film has a "sturdy, surprisingly crafty story" but calling Kong's design and appearance a "major drawback." Variety listed it number sixteen on their 2021 ranking of every Godzilla film. Collider ranked the film number two on their Shōwa Godzilla list in 2022, describing the fight choreography as "beautiful."

== Preservation ==
The original Japanese version of King Kong vs. Godzilla is infamous for being one of the most poorly-preserved tokusatsu films. In 1970, director Ishirō Honda prepared an edited version of the film for the Toho Champion Festival, a children's matinee program that showcased edited re-releases of older kaiju films along with cartoons and then-new kaiju films. Honda cut 24 minutes from the film's original negative and, as a result, the highest quality source for the cut footage was lost. For years, all that was thought to remain of the uncut 1962 version was a faded, heavily damaged 16mm element from which rental prints were made. 1980s restorations for home video integrated the 16mm deleted scenes into the 35mm Champion cut, resulting in wildly inconsistent picture quality.

On July 14, 2016, a 4K restoration of a completely 35mm sourced version of the film aired on The Godzilla First Impact, a series of 4K broadcasts of Godzilla films on the Nihon Eiga Senmon Channel.

== Legacy ==
It was such an entertaining film. The house was packed, you know? We could barely get a seat.

— Masaaki Tezuka (director of Godzilla vs. Megaguirus, Godzilla Against Mechagodzilla, and Godzilla: Tokyo S.O.S.) reminisces on watching the film in his childhood.

Due to the great box office success of this film, Toho wanted to produce a sequel immediately. Shinichi Sekizawa was brought back to write the screenplay tentatively titled Continuation: King Kong vs. Godzilla (続 キングコング対ゴジラ, Zoku Kingu Kongu tai Gojira). Sekizawa revealed that Kong killed Godzilla during their underwater battle in Sagami Bay with a line of dialogue stating "Godzilla, who sank and died in the waters off Atami". As the story progressed, Godzilla's body is salvaged from the Ocean by a group of entrepreneurs who hope to display the remains at a planned resort. Meanwhile, King Kong is found in Africa where he had been protecting a baby (the sole survivor of a plane crash). After the baby is rescued by investigators, and is taken back to Japan, Kong follows the group and rampages through the country looking for the infant. Godzilla is then revived with hopes of driving off Kong. The story ends with both monsters plummeting into a volcano. The project was ultimately cancelled. A couple of years later, United Productions of America (UPA) and Toho conceived the idea to pit Godzilla against a giant Frankenstein's monster and commissioned Takeshi Kimura to write a screenplay titled Frankenstein vs. Godzilla, with Jerry Sohl and Reuben Bercovitch writing the story and synopsis for the film. However, Toho would cancel this project as well and instead decided to match Mothra against Godzilla in Mothra vs. Godzilla. This began a formula where kaiju from past Toho films would be added into the Godzilla franchise.

Toho was interested in producing a series around their version of King Kong but were refused by RKO. However, Toho would handle the character once more in 1967 to help Rankin/Bass co-produce their film King Kong Escapes, which was loosely based on a cartoon series Rankin/Bass produced.

Henry G. Saperstein was impressed with the giant octopus scene and requested a giant octopus to appear in Frankenstein Conquers the World and The War of the Gargantuas. The giant octopus appeared in an alternate ending for Frankenstein Conquers the World that was intended for overseas markets, but went unused. As a result, the octopus instead appeared in the opening of The War of the Gargantuas. The film's King Kong suit was recycled and altered to depict Goro in the second episode of Ultra Q, and the suit's torso was later reused to portray King Kong in the water scenes of King Kong Escapes.

Filmmaker Shizuo Nakajima recreated several scenes from this film in his 1983 fan film Legendary Giant Beast Wolfman vs. Godzilla, including the scenes where Godzilla emerges from an iceberg and attacks a train during his rampage on the Japanese mainland.

In 1990, Toho expressed interest in remaking the film as Godzilla vs. King Kong. However, producer Tomoyuki Tanaka stated that obtaining the rights to King Kong proved difficult. Toho then considered producing Godzilla vs. Mechani-Kong but effects director Koichi Kawakita confirmed that obtaining the likeness of King Kong also proved difficult. Mechani-Kong was replaced by Mechagodzilla, and the project was developed into Godzilla vs. Mechagodzilla II in 1993.

In October 2015, Legendary Pictures announced plans for a King Kong vs Godzilla film of their own (unrelated to Toho's version), which was released in the United States on March 31, 2021, simultaneously in theaters and on HBO Max, the film generated its own sequels that expanded into a shared-universe franchise titled the Monsterverse.

=== Dual ending myth ===
For many years, a popular myth has persisted that in the Japanese version of the film, Godzilla emerges as the winner. The myth originated in the pages of Spacemen magazine, a 1960s sister magazine to the influential publication Famous Monsters of Filmland. In an article about the film, it is incorrectly stated that there were two endings and "If you see King Kong vs Godzilla in Japan, Hong Kong or some Oriental sector of the world, Godzilla wins!" The article was reprinted in various issues of Famous Monsters of Filmland in the years following, such as in issues #51 and #114. This misinformation would be accepted as fact and persist for decades. For example, a question in the "Genus III" edition of the popular board game Trivial Pursuit asked, "Who wins in the Japanese version of King Kong vs. Godzilla?" and stated that the correct answer was "Godzilla". Various media have repeated this falsehood, including the Los Angeles Times.

There are technically minor differences in the ending between both versions. For example, in the Japanese version, both Godzilla and King Kong's roars are heard during the film's fade to black while in the American version only Kong's roar is heard. However in both versions, the final shot of Kong swimming away alone is unchanged.

== See also ==
- List of American films of 1963
- Godzilla vs. Kong
