= The World's Most Beautiful Swindlers =

1964 anthology film

- French theatrical release poster
- French: Les plus belles escroqueries du monde
- Directed by: Claude Chabrol; Jean-Luc Godard; Ugo Gregoretti; Hiromichi Horikawa; Roman Polanski
- Written by: Gérard Brach; Claude Chabrol; Paul Gégauff; Jean-Luc Godard; Ugo Gregoretti; Roman Polanski
- Produced by: Pierre Roustang
- Starring: Catherine Deneuve; Charles Denner; Jean Seberg; Mie Hama
- Cinematography: Raoul Coutard; Tonino Delli Colli; Jerzy Lipman; Asakazu Nakai; Jean Rabier
- Edited by: Jacques Gaillard; Agnès Guillemot; Rita van Royen; Hervé de Luze
- Music by: Serge Gainsbourg; Pierre Jansen; Krzysztof Komeda; Michel Legrand; Keitaro Miho; Piero Umiliani
- Production companies: Ulysse Productions; Primex Films; Lux Films; Vides; Toho; Caesar Films
- Distributed by: Lux Compagnie Cinématographique de France (France); Paramount Films of Italy (Italy)
- Release dates: 14 August 1964 (France); 4 October 1964 (Japan); 1964 (Italy); 12 November 1965 (Netherlands)
- Running time: 111 minutes
- Countries: France; Netherlands; Japan; Italy
- Languages: French; Dutch; Japanese; Italian
- Box office: $679,824

The World's Most Beautiful Swindlers (French: Les plus belles escroqueries du monde) is a 1964 crime comedy anthology film composed of five segments, each of which was created with a different set of writers, directors, and actors.

== Cast ==
- Mie Hama as a bar hostess (segment "Les Cinq Bienfaiteurs de Fumiko")
- Ken Mitsuda as a rich client (segment "Les Cinq Bienfaiteurs de Fumiko")
- Nicole Karen as a French tourist (segment "La rivière de diamants")
- Jan Teulings as a Dutch man (segment "La rivière de diamants")
- Gabriella Giorgelli (segment "La Feuille de Route")
- Guido Guiseppone (segment "La Feuille de Route")
- Giuseppe Mannajuolo (segment "La Feuille de Route")
- Jean-Pierre Cassel as Alain des Arcys (segment "L'homme qui vendit la Tour Eiffel")
- Francis Blanche as Mr. Umlaut (segment "L'homme qui vendit la Tour Eiffel")
- Catherine Deneuve as a swindler (segment "L'homme qui vendit la Tour Eiffel")
- Jean Seberg as Patricia (segment "Le Grand escroc")
- Charles Denner as a con man (segment "Le Grand escroc")
- Laszlo Szabo as a police inspector (segment "Le Grand escroc")

== Release ==
The World's Most Beautiful Swindlers was released in France in August 1964, in Italy in 1964, in Japan on 4 October 1964 and in the Netherlands on 12 November 1965. In the United States, the film was released on 12 September 1967 by Ellis Films and Continental Distributing.

The film was unavailable for many decades, until it was restored and released on home video in France on 23 September 2016 and in the United States on 25 April 2017.

Roman Polanski's segment of the film, "La rivière de diamants" ("A River of Diamonds"), has been removed, at his direct request, and that portion is thus still unavailable.
