= Akiko Wakabayashi =

Japanese actress (born 1939)

- 若林 映子
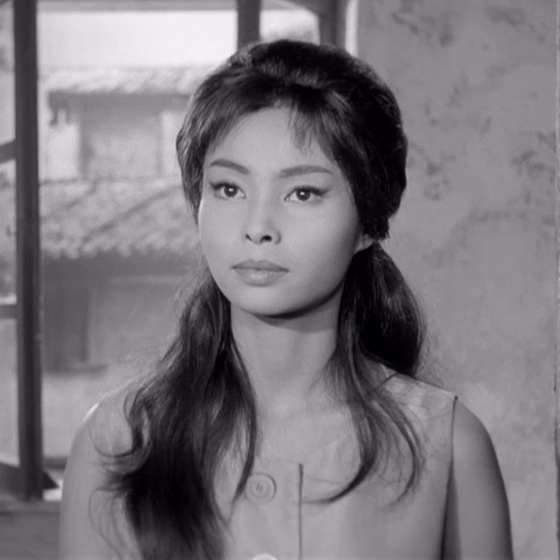
- Akiko Wakabayashi in Akiko (1961)
- Born: 13 December 1939 (age 86); Ōta, Tokyo, Japan
- Occupation: Actress
- Years active: 1958–1971
- Known for: You Only Live Twice as Bond girl Aki

Akiko Wakabayashi (若林 映子, Wakabayashi Akiko; born 13 December 1939) is a retired Japanese actress.

== Career ==
Wakabayashi is best known in English-speaking countries for her role as Bond girl Aki in the 1967 James Bond film You Only Live Twice. Before this, she had made many films in her native Japan, especially Toho Studio's monster films, such as Dogora, the Space Monster (1964) and Ghidorah, the Three-Headed Monster (1964), both of which were also released under various other titles. In Ghidorah, she played a mystical princess, who could predict the future and was also a prophetess.

When production of You Only Live Twice began, Wakabayashi was slated to play the role of Kissy Suzuki while her co-star Mie Hama played Suki, one of Tiger Tanaka's top agents. When learning English proved to be a major hurdle to Hama, the women switched roles, with Hama playing the smaller part of Kissy and Wakabayashi playing the larger part of Suki. At her suggestion, the character of Suki was renamed Aki. They had acted together in King Kong vs. Godzilla (1962) and Kokusai himitsu keisatsu: Kagi no kagi (1965), from which footage was recut to make Woody Allen's What's Up, Tiger Lily?

In 1971, she made an appearance in an episode of Shirley's World. Wakabayashi made only one more film (and a guest TV appearance) before disappearing from both the big and small screen. In an interview in G-FAN magazine (No. 76), Wakabayashi said she retired from acting owing to injuries sustained while making a film.

== Selected filmography ==
- Song for a Bride (1958)
- Josei SOS (1958)
- Yajû shisubeshi (1959)
- Osorubeki hiasobi (1959)
- Le orientali (1960) as Sadako
- Shin santô jûyaku: Ataru mo hakke no maki (1960) as Haruko Momoyama
- Akiko (1961) as Akiko
- Girl from Hong Kong (1961) as Anna Suh
- Yato kaze no naka o hashiru (1961) as Sawa
- Ganba (1961)
- Ai no uzu shio (1962)
- Kurenai no sora (1962)
- King Kong vs. Godzilla (1962) as Tamiye
- Gekkyû dorobo (1962)
- Ankokugai no kiba (1962)
- Nippon jitsuwa jidai (1963)
- Kokusai himitsu keisatsu: shirei dai hachigo (1963) as Mie Tsugawa
- Walleyed Nippon (1963) as Nashiko
- The Lost World of Sinbad (1963) as Yaya's maid
- Kon'nichiwa akachan (1964) as Shizuko Nagata
- Dogora, the Space Monster (1964) as Gangster Hamako
- Kokusai himitsu keisatsu: Kayaku no taru (1964) as Girl Taken at Haneda
- Ghidorah, the Three-Headed Monster (1964) as Princess of Sergina
- Kokusai himitsu keisatsu: Kagi no kagi (1965, footage used to make What's Up, Tiger Lily?) as Bai-Lan
- The Stranger Within a Woman (1966) as Sayuri Sugimoto
- Kiganjô no bôken (1966) as Spuria, Chamberlain's daughter
- Arupusu no wakadaishô (1966)
- You Only Live Twice (1967) as Aki
- Diamonds of the Andes (1968) as Reiko
