= Tracy Bond =

James Bond character

- James Bond character
- Diana Rigg as Tracy
- First appearance: Novel: On Her Majesty's Secret Service (1963); Film: On Her Majesty's Secret Service (1969)
- Created by: Ian Fleming
- Portrayed by: Diana Rigg

In-universe information
- Full name: Teresa Draco di Vicenzo
- Gender: Female
- Title(s): Teresa, Countess di Vicenzo
- Occupation: Countess
- Spouses: James Bond (husband); Count Giulio di Vicenzo (former husband)
- Children: Unnamed daughter
- Relatives: Marc-Ange Draco (father)
- Classification: Bond girl

Teresa "Tracy" Bond (née Draco, also known as Contessa Teresa di Vicenzo) is a fictional character and the main Bond girl in the 1963 James Bond novel On Her Majesty's Secret Service, where she becomes the first Bond girl to marry 007. In the novel’s 1969 film adaptation, Tracy is played by the actress Diana Rigg.

It is suggested that the inspiration for Tracy Bond came from Ian Fleming's wartime romance with Muriel Wright, whom he met while skiing in Kitzbühel. Wright's sudden death in her London flat in 1944 from a bombing raid during The Blitz and Fleming's subsequent grief are reflected in Tracy's unexpected death and its effect on Bond, evident in the succeeding novels and film adaptations.

== Biography ==
Born Teresa Draco in 1943 (1937 in the novel), she is the only child of Marc-Ange Draco, the head of a powerful Unione Corse, or Corsican mafia crime family – not quite as large as SPECTRE, but with substantially larger "legal" operations, including Draco Construction. Teresa goes by "Tracy", because she feels "Teresa" does not suit her. As she introduced herself to Bond, she stated, "Teresa is a saint; I'm known as Tracy."

Tracy's mother was an English governess who died in 1955. Her father then sent her to a boarding school in Switzerland. Deprived of a stable home life, Tracy joined the "international fast set", committing "one scandal after another". When Draco cut off her allowance, Tracy committed "a greater folly" out of spite. She married into the Italian nobility, Count Giulio di Vicenzo, who got hold of a large portion of her money before leaving her. Draco paid him off for a divorce, but di Vicenzo died while driving a Maserati in the company of one of his mistresses. Tracy had his child, who later died of spinal meningitis.

Diana Rigg and George Lazenby as the newlywed Bonds in On Her Majesty's Secret Service (1969).

Desperate with grief for her child, Tracy attempts suicide by walking into the sea in Portugal, but is rescued by James Bond.

When her father meets Bond, he pleads with Bond to continue to see her, claiming that their relationship has changed her for the better. Bond initially refuses, but he changes his mind when Marc-Ange offers his resources for anything Bond desires. Since the events of Thunderball and the demise of SPECTRE, Bond had been hunting for Ernst Stavro Blofeld, and at one point was willing to retire from MI6 because he felt the hunt was folly and that his services and abilities could be used better. Using Draco's resources, however, Bond is able to track Blofeld to Switzerland. In return, Bond continues to see Tracy and eventually falls in love with her. On their wedding day, Blofeld and his henchwoman Irma Bunt engage Bond and Tracy in a drive-by shooting and Tracy is killed.

In the film, Tracy drives a red 1969 model Mercury Cougar XR-7 convertible.

== Legacy ==
In Fleming's novels, Bond is a broken man after Tracy's death. In You Only Live Twice, he has begun drinking heavily, which has affected his work. M is forced to acknowledge that Bond is no longer fit for service, but he decides to give Bond one last chance and assigns him to an intelligence-related diplomatic affair in Japan. This in turn leads to a duel to the death with Blofeld in the climax of the novel, and Bond is finally awarded his revenge but suffers a head injury that leaves him with amnesia.

In the films, James Bond is tracking Blofeld in the pre-title credits sequence of Diamonds Are Forever. The film does not explain why nor does it mention Tracy. Originally, it had been planned that On Her Majesty's Secret Service would end with Bond and Tracy driving away from their wedding. The scenes where she was shot were filmed at the same time with the intention that they would form the pre-title sequence of Diamonds Are Forever. As a result of George Lazenby leaving the role, these scenes ended up being part of On Her Majesty's Secret Service.

Subsequent films, until the original timeline's end in 2002, reference the fact that Bond was previously married, but only fleetingly:

- In The Spy Who Loved Me, when Bond meets Anya Amasova in the Mujaba Club bar, in Cairo, she summarises his career and personal life to him. When she notes, "... many lady friends, but married only once. Wife killed —", Bond cuts her short by saying, "Alright, you've made your point". Anya comments that he is sensitive. Bond replies, "About certain things, yes".

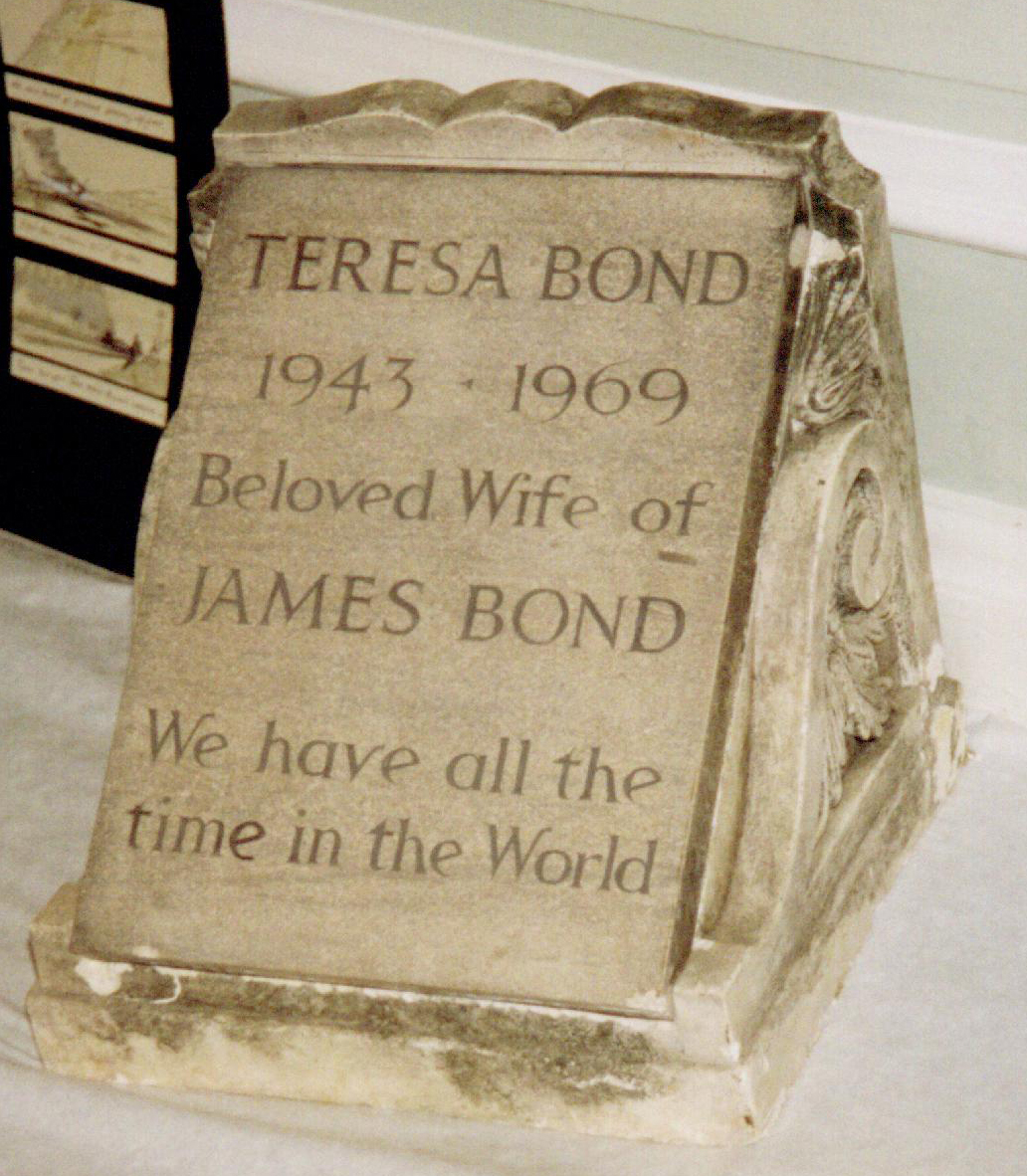
The tombstone of James Bond's wife, Teresa, which Bond visits in For Your Eyes Only. Shown at a James Bond convention in 1992.

- In For Your Eyes Only, in the pre-title sequence, Bond lays flowers at Tracy's grave in the churchyard of St Giles, Stoke Poges before boarding a helicopter. The headstone reads: "TERESA BOND, 1943–1969, Beloved Wife of JAMES BOND / We have all the time in the World" – referring to the final words in On Her Majesty's Secret Service, which became that movie's theme song. The headstone shows Tracy died in 1969, the same year On Her Majesty's Secret Service was released.
- In Licence to Kill, after Felix Leiter's wedding, Felix's new wife Della offers her garter to Bond, saying, "the next one who catches this is the next one who ..." Bond turns it down and leaves. Felix tells Della, "He was married once, but it was a long time ago."
- In The World Is Not Enough, Elektra King asks Bond if he's "ever lost a loved one." Bond pauses and brushes off the question. The title of the film is taken from the Bond family motto, which he learned in On Her Majesty's Secret Service.

== Movie props ==
Tracy's wedding dress is now kept at the Admiral Hotel in Milan, along with a collection of James Bond and Chitty-Chitty-Bang-Bang items.
