= Mie Hama =

Japanese actress (born 1943)

- 浜美枝
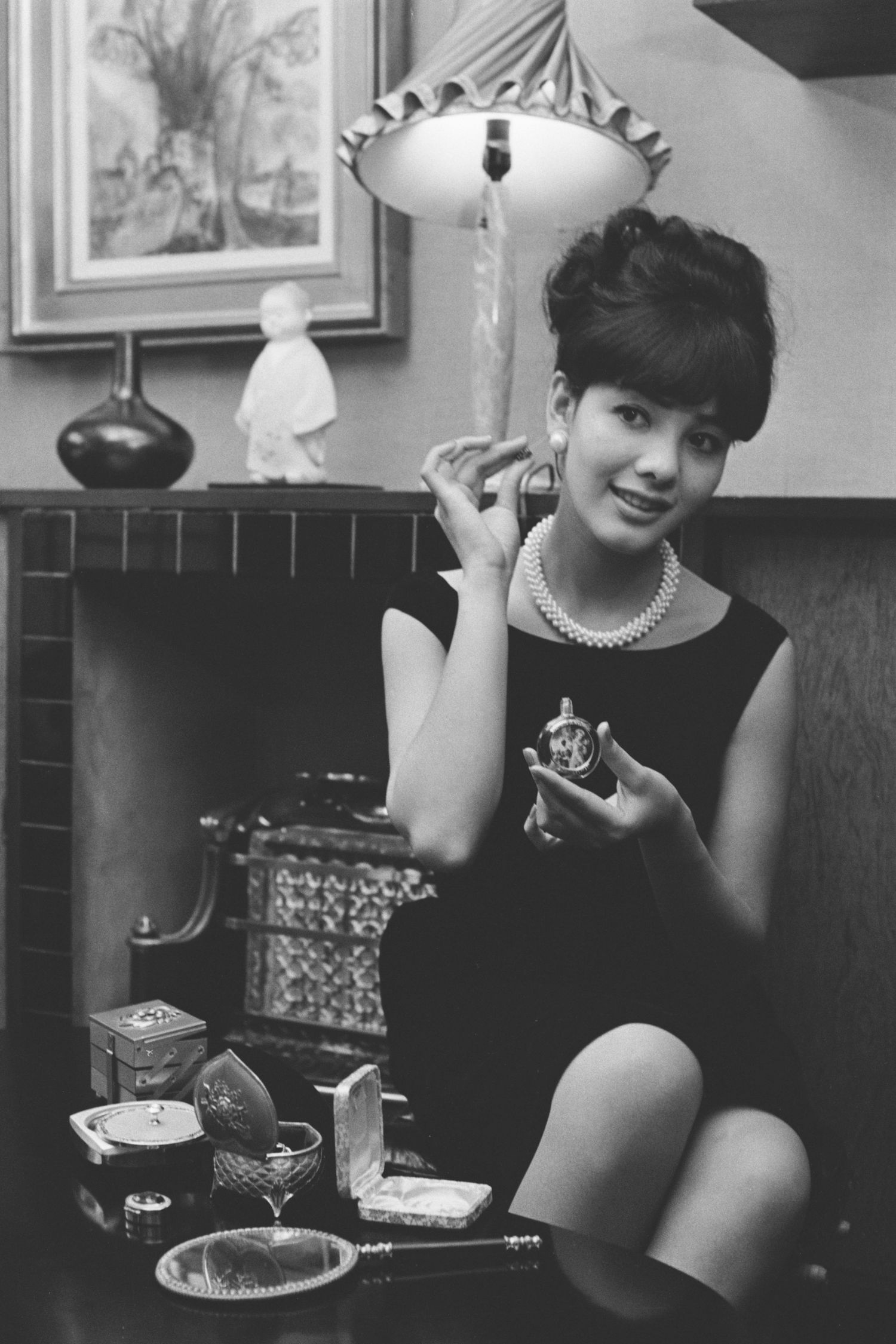
- Hama in 1962
- Born: 20 November 1943 (age 82); Tokyo, Japan
- Occupations: Actress, television presenter, radio presenter, author
- Years active: 1960–1989
- Spouse: Mitsuru Kaneko (m. 1969; died 2018)
- Children: 4

Mie Hama (浜 美枝, Hama Mie; IPA: [hama mi.e]; born 20 November 1943) is a Japanese former actress, television presenter, radio presenter, and author best known for playing Fumiko Sakurai in the 1962 Godzilla film, King Kong vs. Godzilla, Kissy Suzuki in the 1967 James Bond film, You Only Live Twice, and Madame Piranha in the 1967 King Kong film, King Kong Escapes.

== Career ==
Hama was working as a bus conductor when she was spotted by producer Tomoyuki Tanaka. She went on to become one of the most in-demand actresses in Japan. Notable appearances included the 1965 spy comedy Kokusai himitsu keisatsu: Kagi no kagi, which was the source for the Woody Allen film What's Up, Tiger Lily? and Toho Studio's monster and fantasy movies such as King Kong vs. Godzilla (1962), The Lost World of Sinbad (1963) and King Kong Escapes (1967). By the time she starred in You Only Live Twice, she had made more than 60 movies.

Hama was originally cast to play the character Aki (who was originally named Suki) and her co-star Akiko Wakabayashi was cast to play Kissy Suzuki. The two actresses were sent to London for three months, to be tutored in English, although in the end, Hama was dubbed by Nikki van der Zyl. She is dedicated to supporting Japan's natural wonders and preserving the environment. She also owns and rents out a traditional house near Mt. Fuji called "Hakone-Yamaboushi" that is built from various abandoned houses.

She said in a 2017 New York Times article that she gave up acting because she wanted a normal life, a life that includes authoring 14 books, becoming a television and radio host, connoisseur of folk art and advocating the preservation of old farms and farming techniques, and not losing the authentic Japan for economic development, as well as marrying a TV executive and raising their four children.

== Personal life ==
In 1969, she was married to Mitsuru Kaneko (1939–2018), a television executive producer of Fuji TV, with whom she has four children.

== Partial filmography ==
- King Kong vs. Godzilla (1962) as Fumiko Sakarai
- The Lost World of Sinbad (1963) as Princess Yaya
- Attack Squadron! (1963)
- Yearning (1964) as Ruriko
- The World's Most Beautiful Swindlers (1964) (the Tokyo segment)
- Kokusai himitsu keisatsu: Kagi no kagi (1965) as Miichin
- Ironfinger (1965) as Yumi Sawada
- You Only Live Twice (1967) as Kissy Suzuki
- King Kong Escapes (1967) as Madame Piranha
- Edo no Kaze (1975) as Oyō
