= A View to a Kill (disambiguation) =

A View to a Kill is a 1985 James Bond film.

A View to a Kill may also refer to:

- "A View to a Kill" (song), the film's theme song by Duran Duran
- A View to a Kill (soundtrack), a soundtrack album from the film
- A View to a Kill (video game), two 1985 computer games based on the film
- A View to a Kill (adventure), a 1985 adventure for the James Bond 007 espionage role-playing game published by Victory Games
- "From a View to a Kill", a James Bond short story by Ian Fleming, from the 1960 collection For Your Eyes Only
- "A View to a Kill" (The Vampire Diaries), an episode of the TV series The Vampire Diaries
