= Monsters, Aliens, and Holes in the Ground =

2023 book by Stu Horvath

- Author: Stu Horvath
- Illustrator: Kyle Patterson; Amanda Lee Franck; Evlyn Moreau; Nate Treme
- Cover artist: Kyle Patterson
- Publisher: MIT Press
- Publication date: 2023
- ISBN: 9780262375443

Monsters, Aliens, and Holes in the Ground, subtitled "A Guide to Tabletop Roleplaying Games from D&D to Mothership", is a book by Stu Horvath, published by MIT Press in 2023, that explains the history and evolution of role-playing games (RPGs) from Dungeons & Dragons in 1974 to the 2020s.

== Contents ==
The book is constructed as a series of essays and reviews of role-playing games, organized chronologically by their publication dates, and grouped by decade. Each decade section has an illustrated frontispiece by Kyle Patterson pastiching the themes that dominated the works in that era.

=== The 1970s ===
- Cities (1979)
- D&D Supplement II: Blackmoor (1975)
- Tegel Manor (1977)
- City State of the Invincible Overlord (1976)
- B1: In Search of the Unknown (1978)
- Gorey Games (1979)
- B2: The Keep on the Borderlands (1979)
- D1: Descent into the Depths of the Earth (1978)
- D2: Shrine of the Kuo-Toa (1978)
- D3: Vault of the Drow (1978)
- Dungeon Master's Guide (1979)
- G1: Steading of the Hill Giant Chief (1978)
- G2: Glacial Rift of the Frost Giant Jarl (1978)
- G3: Hall of the Fire Giant King (1978)
- Monster Manual (1977)
- Players Handbook (1978)
- S1: Tomb of Horrors (1978)
- Supplement III: Eldritch Wizardry (1976)
- Dungeons & Dragons (1974)
- The Official Advanced Dungeons & Dragons Coloring Album (1979)
- En Garde! (1975)
- Dungeons and Dragons Basic Set (1977)
- Bushido (1979)
- The Fantasy Trip: Melee (1977)
- The Fantasy Trip: Wizard (1978)
- Dark Tower (1979)
- The Caverns of Thracia (1979)
- Palace of the Vampire Queen (1976)
- Gods, Demi-Gods & Heroes (1976)
- Traveller (1977)
- Wilderlands of High Fantasy (1977)
- Superworld (1983)
- Worlds of Wonder (1982)
- Cults of Prax (1979)
- Runequest (1978)
- All The Worlds' Monsters (1977)
- All The Worlds' Monsters Volume Two (1979)
- Arden (Chivalry & Sorcery) (1979)
- Chivalry & Sorcery (1977)
- Tunnels & Trolls (1975)
- Cults of Terror (1979)
- Snakepipe Hollow (1979)
- Metamorphosis Alpha (1976)
- Gamma World (1978)
- Journal of the Traveller's Aid Society (1979)

=== The 1980s ===
- SF2: Starspawn of Volturnus (1982)
- The City of Carse (1980)
- Justice, Inc. (1984)
- The Iron Wind (1980)
- Rolemaster (1982)
- HeroQuest (1989)
- City System (1988)
- WG7: Castle Greyhawk (1988)
- Hawkmoon (1986)
- Valley of the Mists (1982)
- Dark Dungeons (1984)
- Middle-Earth Role Playing (1984)
- Arms Law (1980)
- Shadowrun (1989)
- Advanced Dungeons & Dragons Second Edition (1989)
- Bullwinkle and Rocky Roleplaying Party Game (1988)
- CB1: Conan Unchained! (1984)
- Dungeons & Dragons Expert Set (1981)
- Dungeon Master Guide (1989)
- Time of the Dragon (1989)
- X1: The Isle of Dread (1981)
- Toon: The Cartoon Roleplaying Game (1984)
- Star Wars: The Roleplaying Game (1987)
- Hârn Regional Module (1983)
- Hârnmaster (1986)
- Shadows Over Bögenhafen (1987)
- Galaxy Guide 4: Alien Races (1989)
- Masks of Nyarlathotep (1985)
- Demon Magic: The Second Stormbringer Companion (1985)
- Street Samurai Catalog (1989)
- Dallas: The Television Role-Playing Game (1980)
- The Monstrous Compendium, Volume One (1989)
- SFAC3: Zebulon's Guide to Frontier Space, Volume 1 (1985)
- Dungeoneer (1989)
- Q Manual: The Illustrated Guide to the World’s Finest Armory (1983)
- Forgotten Realms Campaign Set (1987)
- Manual of the Planes (1987)
- Marvel Super Heroes Advanced Set (1986)
- Spelljammer (1989)
- Marvel Super Heroes (1984)
- S3: Expedition to the Barrier Peaks (1980)
- Unearthed Arcana (1985)
- WG7: Castle Greyhawk (1988)
- The World of Greyhawk (1980)
- Oriental Adventures (1985)
- Warhammer Fantasy Roleplay (1986)
- The Arduin Trilogy (1981)
- DL1: Dragons of Despair (1984)
- DL8: Dragons of War (1985)
- I6: Ravenloft (1983)
- I10: Ravenloft II: The House on Gryphon Hill. (1986)
- DL4: Dragons of Desolation (1984)
- Fighting Fantasy: The Introductory Role-Playing Game (1984)
- GURPS (1986)
- In the Labyrinth (1980)
- Steve Jackson’s Man to Man (1985)
- Tollenkar’s Lair (1980)
- The Warlock of Firetop Mountain (1982)
- Orcslayer (1985)
- Legendary Duck Tower (1980)
- Thrilling Locations (1985)
- RuneMasters (1980)
- World Action and Adventure (1985)
- James Bond 007 Basic Set (1983)
- Griffin Mountain (1981)
- Skyrealms of Jorune (1985)
- RS1: Red Sonja Unconquered (1986)
- Star Trek: The Role Playing Game (1983)
- The Triangle (1985)
- Dungeons & Dragons Set 1: Basic Rules. (1983)
- Dungeons & Dragons Set 2: Expert Rules (1983)
- Dungeons & Dragons Set 3: Companion Rules (1984)
- Dungeons & Dragons Set 4: Master Rules (1985)
- Dungeons & Dragons Set 5: Immortal Rules (1985)
- IM1: The Immortal Storm (1986)
- MegaTraveller (1987)
- The Spinward Marches Campaign (1985)
- Traveller: Starter Edition (1985)
- Dungeons & Dragons B/X (1981)
- Lankhmar: City of Adventure (1985)
- Darkwalker on Moonshae (1987)
- Dungeoneer’s Survival Guide (1986)
- Knight Hawks (1983)
- Dragonroar (1985)
- Superworld (1983)
- Borderlands (1982)
- Worlds of Wonder (1982)
- Call of Cthulhu (1981)
- Cthulhu Companion (1983)
- Cthulhu Now (1987)
- Fragments of Fear (1985)
- Champions: The Super Hero Role Playing Game (1982)
- Ghostbusters (1986)
- Cyberpunk (1988)
- LC1: Gateway to Ravens Bluff, The Living City (1989)
- Black Sword (1985)
- Power Behind the Throne (1988)
- A Naturalist’s Guide to Talislanta (1987)
- The Talislanta Handbook and Campaign Guide (1987)
- The Star Wars Sourcebook (1987)
- Stormbringer (1981)
- King Arthur Pendragon (1985)
- Prince Valliant: The Story-Telling Game (1989)
- Basic Role-Playing (1980)
- Galaxy Guide 3: The Empire Strikes Back (1989)
- Bunnies & Burrows (1982)
- Q1: Queen of the Demonweb Pits (1980)
- Ars Magica (1987)
- Fiend Folio (1981)
- Deluxe City Campaign Set (1989)
- Deities & Demigods (1980)
- Thieves’ World (1981)
- Thieves’ World Companion (1986)
- Star Frontiers (1982)
- After the Bomb (1986)
- Road Hogs (1986)
- Teenage Mutant Ninja Turtles & Other Strangeness (1985)
- DragonRaid (1983)

== Publication history ==
Stu Horvath became a collector of old and sometimes forgotten RPGs, a hobby that solidified when Chaosium started to release boxed sets of their old games. As Horvath related, "I just got the collector's bug and started accumulating all this stuff. And then, because I overthink everything, I can't just appreciate it on its own, I started to try and make sense of it all." The result was a chronologically ordered examination of the evolution of RPGs titled Monsters, Aliens, and Holes in the Ground, published by MIT Press in 2023 with cover art by Kyle Patterson.

== Reception ==
Lin Codega called this book "an encyclopedic assemblage of tabletop roleplaying games, both vintage and contemporary. It's also an acute analysis of game design during each decade." Codega also critiqued some omissions: "it doesn't quite get into some of the seminal story games work of the 2010s. For example, the 2018 game, Dream Askew/Dream Apart, written by Avery Alder and Benjamin Rosenbaum respectively, which introduced the Belonging Outside Belonging system, isn't included."

Mark Pilkington wrote in the Fortean Times: "While not intended to be comprehensive (it would be many times its size) its 200- chronological entries, all illustrated with photographs from Horvath's own collection, chart the evolution of the form, taking in the great (D&D in multiple iterations), the weird (Dallas: The Television Role Playing Game) and the simply un-categorisable (World Action and Adventure) titles that emerged along the way. Each entry is detailed, erudite and entertaining on its own but, read successively, they chart the flows of ideas, fads, themes and experiments found within RPG history's many hundreds of thousands of pages."

Thomas L. McDonald in Games World of Puzzles Magazine said it "is a heavy brick of a book: what a set of game rules might call a weighty tome of obscure and eldritch knowledge. For those who lived through all this, it’s a delightful nostalgia trip; for those new to it, it's a good overview of where this ever-evolving genre has been."
