= A View to a Kill (video game) =

- Cover for The Computer Game
- Developers: Domark; Angelsoft
- Publishers: Domark; Mindscape
- Series: James Bond
- Platforms: The Computer Game: Amstrad CPC; Commodore 64; MSX; Oric; ZX Spectrum; Text adventure: Apple II; Macintosh; MS-DOS
- Release: WW: 1985
- Genre: Action
- Mode: Single-player

A View to a Kill are two separate video games released in 1985 and based on the James Bond film A View to a Kill. The first, an action game titled A View to a Kill: The Computer Game, was developed and published by Domark. It was available for the ZX Spectrum, Amstrad CPC, Commodore 64, MSX, and Oric. The second game, James Bond 007: A View to a Kill, is a text-based adventure for MS-DOS, Macintosh, and Apple II. It was developed by Angelsoft, and published by Mindscape.

== A View to a Kill: The Computer Game ==
Domark created an action game split into three separate sections, inspired by scenes from the film. The game starts with the famous movie intro sequence of the moving gunsight and Bond shooting towards the camera. The MSX version omitted the first two sections.

In the first section set in Paris, James Bond commandeers a taxi to follow May Day who has parachuted from the Eiffel Tower. Roadblocks and police cars are out to stop Bond, who can shoot his pistol at them to get them out of the way. The display is in three sections: an overhead map of Paris, a small 3D view from the car's point of view, and a scanner showing May Day's height. Bond must arrive at the right location to catch her as she lands.

In the second section, Bond must help Stacey Sutton escape from a burning San Francisco City Hall. Each room is displayed from a side-on perspective. Bond must collect useful objects to get through the floors of the building, such as keys to open doors and buckets of water to stop the progress of the fire.

In the third and final section, Bond must collect the code numbers to stop the detonation of Zorin's bomb. Bond runs around the mine, avoiding rockfalls and long drops. Among the objects he can pick up are a grapnel gun (to fire ropes upward which he can climb to safety) and a plank of wood to bridge gaps. May Day is also somewhere in the mine.

A password system lets the user play the second or third levels on their own without completing the first.

=== Music ===
The music for the Commodore 64 version was written by Antony (Tony) Crowther, and consists of two covers. One is the "James Bond Theme" by Monty Norman. The second is the Duran Duran theme for the film.

== James Bond 007: A View to a Kill ==
Mindscape published James Bond 007: A View to a Kill, a text adventure by Angelsoft for MS-DOS, Classic Mac OS and Apple II. Future Bond novelist Raymond Benson worked on the development of the game. It was followed by James Bond 007: Goldfinger.

== Reception ==
=== A View to a Kill: The Computer Game ===
Sinclair User gave the ZX Spectrum version four stars out of five. Commodore User called the Commodore 64 version, "Certainly one of the better 'game of the film' implementations around." Your Commodore gave the Commodore 64 version two stars out of five and criticized some of the gameplay concepts, writing, "Sometimes programmers can go overboard with special effects at the expense of what could otherwise be a superb game. A View to a Kill is one such example."

Zzap!64, which gave the Commodore 64 version a 36 percent rating, criticized the game's graphics, its music, and its three separate gameplay modes, writing that focusing on a single gameplay style might have been better. Zzap!64's overall conclusion of the game was, "A powerful idea that seems to have missed its point." Zzap!64 reviewed the Commodore 64 version again in 1992, giving it a 19 percent rating and writing that "the problem was a licence with such potential being turned into such a diabolical arcade adventure."

=== James Bond 007: A View to a Kill ===
QuestBusters, which wrote a positive review, praised the game's "well-written" text and "well-paced story", but criticized its first level for being "a skullsmasher that's near impossible without information obtained only in the film. [...] Maybe the designers figured people wouldn't play this game unless they'd seen the movie." QuestBusters criticized the game's slow loading times and response times as its "major drawback", but ultimately concluded, "Bond fans will not be disappointed."

== See also ==
- Outline of James Bond
