= A View to a Kill (soundtrack) =

Soundtrack album by John Barry
- Released: 1985
- Length: 38:23
- Labels: EMI (UK); Capitol (US)

Singles from A View to a Kill
- 1. "A View to a Kill" Released: May 1985

A View to a Kill is the 1985 soundtrack for the film of the same name, the 14th installment in the James Bond film series.

== Theme song ==
The theme song "A View to a Kill", was written by John Barry and Duran Duran, and was recorded in London with a 60-piece orchestra. "A View to a Kill" is the most successful Bond theme to date. In 1986, Barry and Duran Duran were nominated for the Golden Globe Award for Best Original Song at the 43rd Golden Globe Awards.

Duran Duran was chosen to do the song after bassist John Taylor (a lifelong Bond fan) approached producer Cubby Broccoli at a party, and somewhat drunkenly asked "When are you going to get someone decent to do one of your theme songs?"

The single was released in May 1985, and on 13 July it hit number one on the U.S. Billboard Hot 100 chart, and as of 2024 remains the only Bond theme to do so. On 25 May, it made it to number two in the UK Singles Chart, also a record for Bond themes until "Writing's on the Wall" by Sam Smith from the soundtrack to Spectre made it to number one in 2015. The b-side was an instrumental piece orchestrated by John Barry, titled "A View to a Kill (That Fatal Kiss)" which appeared on the soundtrack album as "Bond Meets Stacey (A View to a Kill)". The song was the last track that the original five members of Duran Duran recorded together until 2001.

The video for the single was directed by the duo Godley & Creme, with shots of the band at the Eiffel Tower intercut with scenes from the movie, so that it appears that James Bond (Roger Moore) and May Day (Grace Jones) are participating in the same storyline. The lead singer ends the video with a parody of James Bond, introducing himself as "Bon. Simon Le Bon."

== Other music ==
During the opening pre-title sequence, a cover version of the 1965 Beach Boys song "California Girls", performed by Gidea Park (a tribute band), is used during a chase in which Bond snowboards; it has been suggested that this teaser sequence helped initiate interest in snowboarding.

The film features Antonio Vivaldi's The Four Seasons, which is performed during the reception that Bond attends undercover at Max Zorin (Christopher Walken)'s stud farm in France.

In the remastered CD edition, the third track is incorrectly labeled "May Day Jumpers" on the back of the case.

== Leitmotifs ==
Composer John Barry utilises four leitmotifs on the soundtrack, that recur in two or more of the tracks listed. One is pinned to the theme songs by Duran Duran, one is pinned to henchwoman May Day, one is pinned to the action set-pieces and one appears more generally throughout the film. Barry often called the secondary themes he composed as "action themes" that underscored the action on the screen with hints of the film's theme song, the "James Bond Theme" itself, or simply another theme used only in that particular film. Such themes were occasionally reused, such as his "007 Theme", originally composed for From Russia with Love but brought back for four subsequent Bond pictures. The action theme composed for this film is easily a memorable as those secondary themes he used in You Only Live Twice (the "Space March"), Diamonds Are Forever (a similar space-themed piece, and the "Bond Meets Bambi and Thumper" theme which echoed both the "James Bond Theme" and the title song) among others. The action theme used within A View To A Kill (in the pieces "Snow Job", "He's Dangerous" and "Golden Gate Fight") was similar in its basic composition to that used in On Her Majesty's Secret Service, although it features a wailing electric guitar in the background - at this point Barry was using more contemporary sounding instrumentation within the Bond soundtracks, something he would take further in his next and final score for The Living Daylights.

A View To A Kill Theme

- 1. "A View to a Kill (Main Title)"
- 4. "Bond Meets Stacey (A View to a Kill)"
- 10. "Wine with Stacey (A View to a Kill)"
- 15. "A View to a Kill (End Title)"

"Set-piece Theme"

- 2. "Snow Job’"
- 8. “He’s Dangerous”
- 14. "Golden Gate Fight" (0:30-3:31)

May Day Motif

- 3. "May Day Jumps" (0:00-0:52)
- 14. "Golden Gate Fight" (0:04-0:19)

Pegasus' Theme

- 5. "Pegasus' Stable"
- 6. "Tibbett Gets Washed Out"
- 7. "Airship To Silicon Valley" (1:00-1:24)
- 9. "Bond Underwater"
- 13. "May Day Bombs Out"

== Track listing ==
1. "A View to a Kill (Main Title)" – Duran Duran
2. "Snow Job"
3. "May Day Jumps" (Contains The James Bond Theme)
4. "Bond Meets Stacey (A View to a Kill)"
5. "Pegasus' Stable"
6. "Tibbett Gets Washed Out"
7. "Airship to Silicon Valley"
8. "He's Dangerous"
9. "Bond Underwater"
10. "Wine with Stacey (A View to a Kill)"
11. "Bond Escapes Roller"
12. "Destroy Silicon Valley"
13. "May Day Bombs Out"
14. "Golden Gate Fight"
15. "A View to a Kill (End Title)" – Duran Duran

== See also ==
- Outline of James Bond
