= The Man with the Golden Gun =

The Man with the Golden Gun may refer to:

- The Man with the Golden Gun (novel), a 1965 Ian Fleming novel
- The Man with the Golden Gun (film), a 1974 film, starring Roger Moore as James Bond
  - The Man with the Golden Gun (soundtrack), the soundtrack of the 1974 film
- Francisco Scaramanga, the titular villain of both the novel and the film
- The Man with the Golden Gun (adventure), a 1985 role-playing game adventure for James Bond 007
- "Man With the Golden Gun", an Alice Cooper song released on 1973's Muscle of Love album

== See also ==
- The Man with the Golden Winchester, a 1973 Italian film directed by Gianfranco Baldanello
- Man with the Golden Pistol, a 1965 Spanish-Italian film also known as Doc, Hands of Steel
