= Dr. No =

Dr. No may refer to:

- Dr. No (novel), a 1958 James Bond novel by Ian Fleming
- Dr. No (film), a 1962 film based on the novel
  - Dr. No (soundtrack)
- Julius No, the title character in the Fleming novel and film adaptation
- Dr. No (adventure), a 1984 role-playing game adventure
- Dr. No (serial killer), a nickname given to a serial killer who was theorized to be active in Ohio between 1981 and 1990
- "Dr. No", The Hogan Family season 2, episode 6 (1986)
- "Dr. No" (song), a song by Systems in Blue
- Dr. No?, a 1991 documentary by Jacob Young about William Luther Pierce
- Dr. No: A Novel, a 2022 book by Percival Everett

== Politicians with the nickname ==
- Tom Coburn, a U.S. Senator from Oklahoma and physician, known for blocking legislation
- John Kitzhaber, a Democratic Oregon governor known for vetoing bills passed by the Republican legislature
- Ian Paisley, a religious leader and First Minister of Northern Ireland, known for political obstinacy
- Ron Paul, a member of the U.S. House of Representatives from Texas and physician, who frequently cast dissenting votes
- Stuart Lyon Smith, a Canadian politician, Ontario Provincial Parliament member and psychiatrist, known for opposing spending and pessimism
- Tommy Thompson, a Wisconsin governor and state legislator known for blocking bills
- Andries Treurnicht, a South African Leader of Opposition, leader of the "no" campaign against the 1992 apartheid referendum

== See also ==
- Dr. Know (disambiguation)
- Dr. No's Oxperiment, an album by Oh No
