= Dr. Know =

Dr. Know may refer to:

- Dr. Know (band), a punk band from Oxnard, California
- Dr. Know (guitarist) (born 1958), stage name of guitar player Gary Miller from the band Bad Brains
- Dr. Know (TV series), a TV program on the Discovery Health Channel
- Dr. Know, a commercial information service in the film Artificial Intelligence: A.I.

== See also ==
- Dr. No (disambiguation)
