= Goldfinger II: The Man with the Midas Touch =

Goldfinger II: The Man with the Midas Touch is a 1985 role-playing game adventure for James Bond 007 published by Victory Games. The adventure is inspired by the 1959 novel Goldfinger by Ian Fleming and by its 1964 film adaptation, while the title is taken from a lyric of the film's musical theme.

== Plot summary ==
The player characters investigate the disappearance of three physicists and the mysterious death of the M.I.6 agent who had been assigned to guard a fourth physicist.

== Reception ==
Steve Crow reviewed Goldfinger II: The Man with the Midas Touch in Space Gamer No. 76. Crow commented that "overall, Goldfinger II, while not the best of Victory's James Bond 007 movie adventures, is far from the worst, and a good addition to any GM's secret agent RPG library."
