= You Only Live Twice (adventure) =

Role-playing game adventure

You Only Live Twice is a licensed adventure published by Victory Games in 1984 for the espionage role-playing game James Bond 007.

== Description ==
The You Only Live Twice boxed set contains a 56-page book of the adventure, a cardstock gamemaster's screen with maps of Japan and the villain's hideout, and an envelope with 8 sheets of player handouts, including imitation photographs, and an article from the Times. The adventure is scaled for four Rookie Agents, and is based on the plot of the movie You Only Live Twice.

=== Plot summary ===
MI6 is searching for a Soviet space shuttle containing a deadly virus that has disappeared in the area of the Sea of Japan.

=== Book contents ===
The 56-page book is divided into five parts:

1. Introduction and Briefing: The team's briefing and equipment provided by Q
2. Non-Player Characters: All significant personalities the players will meet
3. Places, Events and Encounters: The details of the adventure
4. Adventure Information: The consequences of success or failure, as well as possible modifications that can be made to the adventure
5. Japanese Society: Background information about Japan.

== Publication history ==
Victory Games, a division of Avalon Hill, acquired the license to create a role-playing game based on the James Bond movie franchise and published James Bond 007 in 1983. The game was supported by many adventures and supplements, including 1984's You Only Live Twice, a boxed set designed by Neil Randall, with artwork by Ted Koller and James Talbot.

== Reception ==
In Issue 24 of Imagine, Nick Davison wrote that the player handouts were "excellent", and the artwork was "of a high standard." He also liked the frequent advice for the gamemaster about how to guide players back to the plotline should they stray. He recommended the boxed set, saying, "This scenario should provide entertainment for numerous role-playing sessions."

In Issue 34 of Abyss, Jon Schuller commented "The appearance, art and graphics are excellent. The writing style is clear and the scenario is eminently comprehensible." Schuller concluded, "This is one of the finest scenario productions I have ever seen, both for presentation and content. If you play James Bond 007, it is a must buy.

Larry DiTillio reviewed You Only Live Twice for Different Worlds magazine and stated that "If there's a flaw in You Only Live Twice, it's the same flaw that bedevils all the Bond modules, namely because the scenarios adapt the Bond films, players can seldom be surprised by certain tricks and traps that come directly from the movies (it's a good assumption that most Bond players do see the movies, most of mine have seen them several times). The Bond modules do change the plots somewhat (successfully so in You Only Live Twice, rather less successfully in Octopussy) and the recognizable encounters do lend the Bond flavor to the modules, but I look forward to the day when we're provided with some totally new material."

== Other reviews and commentary ==
- The V.I.P. of Gaming Magazine #3 (April/May, 1986, p. 40)
