= On Her Majesty's Secret Service (James Bond 007) =

On Her Majesty's Secret Service is a 1987 role-playing game adventure published by Victory Games for James Bond 007.

== Plot summary ==
On Her Majesty's Secret Service is an adventure in which four interconnected solo adventure scenarios utilize adaptive "Action Cards," which scale according to the player character's level. It comes equipped with record sheets, markers, and a comprehensive map that incorporates all essential charts and tables for gameplay.

== Publication history ==
On Her Majesty's Secret Service was written by David Spangler with art by James Talbot, and published by Victory Games in 1987 as a boxed set with an 84-page booklet, a 12-page booklet, map, cards, and counters.
