= James Bond 007 Gamesmaster Pack =

Role-playing game supplement

Cover art by James Talbot, 1983

James Bond 007 Gamesmaster Pack is a supplement published by Victory Games in 1983 for the James Bond 007 role-playing game.

== Contents ==
In 1983, Victory Games, a branch of Avalon Hill, published the James Bond 007 role-playing game based on Ian Fleming's spy novels and the popular movies. At the same time, Victory Games released the James Bond 007 Gamesmaster Pack, designed by Greg Gorden, with art by James Talbot, which contains

- a referee's shield with tables of information for players on one side and information for the gamemaster on the other
- 40 blank character sheets
- cardboard figures with plastic bases
- a gridded sheet for tracking movement.

== Reception ==
In the March 1984 edition of Dragon (Issue 83), Tracy Hickman especially liked the cardboard figures mounted on plastic stands, saying, "At first look, I really didn’t think the cardboard characters would be much help. Yet in the playing of the game, these counters were so easy to use and added such a great visual element to the game that their value could not be questioned." The only problem Hickman had with this supplement was that the open-sided tray-type box was no good for subsequent storage of the components. "Anyone who likes this game is going to quickly find himself with lots of game components and nowhere to store them."

Larry DiTillio reviewed James Bond 007 Gamesmaster Pack for Different Worlds magazine and stated that "As it stands, the Gamesmaster Pack seems sparse for the price - but fans of the game will probably want it anyway. The alternative is flipping through the rulebook a lot for the various charts or making your own screen. The extra character sheets are helpful, but I still feel a little ripped-off by the pack. I love the game enough to live with that."

Nick Davison reviewed James Bond 007 Gamesmaster Pack for Imagine magazine, and stated that "A comprehensive set of gaming aids of varying degrees of value."

In the November 1984 edition of White Dwarf (Issue #59), Bob Neville called the cardboard figures "stylish" and of "good solid quality", but he noted the gridsheet "is too likely to decay quickly since it is on thin paper." Neville also noted the lack of a proper box for storage, didn't feel any of this material was really essential, and concluded by giving the supplement a very poor overall rating of only 4 out of 10, saying it was not "worth the money asked... Victory Games has better learn very quickly about packaging game add-ons if they expect to sell any."
