= Octopussy (adventure) =

Role-playing game supplement

Octopussy is a 1983 role-playing game adventure for James Bond 007 published by Victory Games.

== Plot summary ==
Octopussy is an adventure in which the player characters try to find the murderer of a "00" agent and discover how the murdered agent may have been connected to a Faberge Egg.

== Reception ==
Nick Davison reviewed Octopussy for Imagine magazine and stated that "A bit more expensive than the average scenario, this one does contain more than some. Octopussy should be enjoyed by those who enjoy some character interaction rather than just gunning them down."

Steve Crow reviewed Octopussy in Space Gamer No. 71. Crow commented that "Overall, Octopussy is an excellent buy, a must for any James Bond 007 gamemaster. It could easily be converted to another gaming system, so it is worth purchasing by anyone interesting in secret-agent RPGs."

Larry DiTillio reviewed Octopussy for Different Worlds magazine and stated that "Poor Octopussy, what cruel fate hath done to you! If you've already bought the scenario, my suggestion is do a little work using the movie as an inspiration to link up the locales more logically and come up with a few new clues or encounters to get the players to the real plot sooner. And put some kind of pay-off on Octopussy's circus train, right now it's anybody's guess as to why agents should pursue it. If you don't have the scenario, avoid it."
