= Goldfinger (adventure) =

Goldfinger is a 1983 role-playing game adventure for James Bond 007 published by Victory Games. The adventure is based on Ian Fleming's 1959 novel of the same name and its 1964 film adaptation.

== Plot summary ==
The player characters investigate Auric Goldfinger as part of a mission to stop his gold smuggling venture.

== Reception ==
Nick Davison reviewed Goldfinger for Imagine magazine, and stated that "Altogether a very detailed effort which should last several playing sessions."

Steve Crow reviewed Goldfinger in Space Gamer No. 71. Crow commented that "Goldfinger is a good buy for any James Bond 007 GM, and of interest to any secret-agent roleplaying aficionado."
