= You Only Live Twice II: Back of Beyond =

You Only Live Twice II: Back of Beyond is a 1986 role-playing game adventure published by Victory Games for James Bond 007.

== Plot summary ==
You Only Live Twice II: Back of Beyond is an adventure in which a top-secret file containing chemical warfare data has been stolen from Q Branch, prompting the player characters to investigate the breach and recover the sensitive information. Their mission unfolds across a journey that begins in London and leads into the Australian outback.

== Publication history ==
You Only Live Twice II: Back of Beyond was published by Victory Games in 1986 as boxed set containing a 28-page book, folder, and six reference sheets in an envelope.

== Reviews ==
- Casus Belli (Issue 35 - Dec 1986)
