= Villains (James Bond 007) =

Villains is a 1986 role-playing game supplement published by Victory Games for James Bond 007.

== Contents ==
Villains is a supplement in which detailed profiles of seven major villains are offered, along with comprehensive descriptions of their organizations. It also includes a separate 32-page book focused on SMERSH, the Soviet anti-spy agency, covering its history, leadership, and top assassins. The SMERSH book also features an integrated adventure scenario.

== Publication history ==
Villains was written by Neil Randall and published by Victory Games in 1986 as a boxed set containing a 72-page book, a 32-page book, and 10 dossier sheets in an envelope.

== Reviews ==
- Casus Belli (Issue 34 - Aug 1986)
