= James Bond 007 (role-playing game) =

1983 Tabletop spy role-playing game supplement

Role-Playing In Her Majesty's Secret Service
- Designers: Gerry Klug
- Publishers: Victory Games
- Publication: 1983; 43 years ago
- Genres: Spy fiction
- Systems: Percentile dice
- ISBN: 0-912515-02-3

James Bond 007: Role-Playing In Her Majesty's Secret Service is a spy fiction tabletop role-playing game based on the James Bond books and films. It was designed by Gerry Klug and published by Victory Games, a subsidiary of Avalon Hill. The game and its supplements were published from 1983 until 1987, when the license ended. At its time of publication, it was the most popular espionage role-playing game.

== Setting ==
Player characters are secret agents, either James Bond himself or his allies, other agents of MI6 (the British Secret Intelligence Service), or allied agencies (usually the American CIA). They typically thwart world domination plots from foreign dictators, megalomaniacal mad scientists, and arch-criminals.

Unlike many role-playing games where player characters start as unimportant to the universe and less powerful than the non-player characters, the James Bond setting centers more on the player characters. PCs are usually more competent than NPCs, better outfitted with gadgets (from Q branch), have more Hero Points (see System, below) to perform cinematic feats, and generally have influence over their surroundings.

In keeping with the setting, the game focuses on a few leading roles, not large groups, and plays well with just one gamemaster and one player.

The game was licensed from both Danjaq/Eon Productions, which holds the film rights, and Glidrose Publications (now Ian Fleming Publications), which holds the literary rights, and tried to be as faithful as possible to both the books and the films. To challenge the players, key plot elements in the modules based on the films were changed with a warning to players that exactly imitating Bond's choices and actions in the film's original story would be dangerous. For example, in the module for Live and Let Die, the players learn that Mr. Big and Doctor Kananga are two separate people rather than Kananga playing the New York gangster in disguise. The module for You Only Live Twice changes the outdated space hijacking scheme to an investigation of the crash of a Soviet space station near Japan. PCs must deal with the reported bioweapons being researched on board.

The characters from the Bond cinematic universe, including Bond himself and his allies and enemies (like Anya Amasova, Jaws, and Goldfinger), play important roles. One exception was SPECTRE and its leader, Ernst Stavro Blofeld, the rights to which were contested by Kevin McClory. In the game, they were replaced by a similar organization called T.A.R.O.T. (Technological Accession, Revenge and Organized Terrorism), led by Karl Ferenc Skorpios. The organization's divisions (and their leaders) are represented by Major Arcana tarot cards (like the Blackmail division and its head use XII. Hanged Man and Skorpios himself uses IV. The Emperor).

Covers of 3 adventures for the James Bond 007 role-playing game

== System ==
The system requires 6 and 10-sided dice. Most rolls are made with percentile dice against a success chance, on a table to get a quality rating. Rolling low is good. A roll of over the success chance is a failure, (100 always fails), under the success chance but over approximately half the success chance is a Quality 4, Acceptable success, between approximately a fourth and half the success chance is a Quality 3, Good success, and lower rolls still can get Quality 2, Very Good, or even Quality 1, Excellent ratings. The quality rating directly influences the result. For example, rather than rolling once to hit and once to damage with weapons, the quality rating of the result determines the damage.

The Success Chance is determined by multiplying the Primary Chance of an action by the Ease Factor. Ease Factors are set by the gamemaster, starting at 5 for most situations and modified down for more difficult or up for easier tasks, always ranging between 1/2 and 10. The Primary Chance of most actions is a combination of a characteristic plus skill levels in a specific skill.

Characters have five characteristics, Strength, Dexterity, Willpower, Perception, and Intelligence, ranging from 5 to 15. These are bought at creation time with Generation Points. Remaining Generation Points are used to buy skill levels and the physical aspects of height, weight, and appearance. Since characters are secret agents, the less unusual a character's appearance is, the more generation points it costs; distinctive appearances stand out and earn Fame Points which make others, especially villains, notice them more. The function of Fame points is to encourage players to keep their characters' actions as covert as possible, including minimizing acts of deadly violence. Killing any opponent results in a Fame Point penalty, bringing the agent closer to becoming too well known for operations in the field. There are optional rules for character Weaknesses, which gain generation points at the expense of disadvantages, usually psychological (such as Fear of <something>, Superstition, or James Bond's own Attraction to Members of the Opposite Sex), and Fields of Experience, which gains Generation Points simulating a specific prior character history before becoming an operative, at the expense of greater age, and Fame points.

Skills focus on the James Bond genre, such as Disguise, Demolitions, and Seduction. All player characters begin with skill levels in Connoisseur, First Aid, and Photography.

Experience Points, awarded at the end of missions, are spent like Generation Points, but with restrictions on gaining new skills or modifying characteristics. They can also be spent on equipment (requisitioned from Q branch).

=== Action Rounds ===
The inevitable combat and chase sequences in the James Bond theme are handled by Action Rounds, each of which represents 3–5 seconds of time. All characters involved in a chase or combat declare their actions in reverse order of Speed (1–3, based on the sum of Perception and Dexterity). These actions are executed in order of speed, giving faster characters the advantages of knowing what slower characters are going to do and being able to take their action earlier. Speed also affects how many attacks a character may make in a round.

Chases add a bidding step; fleeing and pursuing sides bid by lowering the Ease Factor of the chase maneuver, with the winning bidder getting to choose whether to try to close or widen the gap first or last, but all sides must make a roll at the resulting Ease Factor.

=== Hero Points ===
Hero Points allow characters to perform cinematic stunts. Characters earn a Hero Point every time they get a Quality 1 result on a skill other than combat and when the GM chooses to award one for a clever or dramatic action. A Hero Point can change the Quality Rating of any result by one level, whether for or against the character. It can also change the environment, such as having something just show up by coincidence. The more fantastic the change, the more Hero Points it costs.

A similar but more restricted system of "Survival Points" applies to villainous characters, but these can only reduce the impact of or prevent actions taken against them by the characters. They can never be an offensive tool. Also, villains do not gain survival points through their successes in an adventure.

Covers of 4 supplements for the James Bond 007 role-playing game

== History ==
The game was considered successful, selling almost 100,000 copies and quickly taking over the status of most popular espionage role-playing game from Top Secret. It was also well supported with supplements by Victory Games. But Avalon Hill had trouble renewing the license from Danjaq in 1987, with each side blaming the other for unwillingness to continue, and the game ceased publication.

Publications in the James Bond 007 line included:

=== Main rules ===
- James Bond 007: Role Playing in Her Majesty's Secret Service (October 1983) ISBN 0-912515-00-7 - the role-playing game rules only.
- James Bond 007: Role Playing in Her Majesty's Secret Service (Box Set) (October 1983) ISBN 0-912515-02-3 - game rules, dice, record sheets

=== Adventures ===
Most adventures were based on specific James Bond movies, with a few vital plot details changed, so players who had seen the film would still be surprised by the adventure. A few were written as sequels to earlier adventures based on specific movies.

- Goldfinger (October 1983) ISBN 0-912515-03-1, based on the book and film.
- Octopussy (October 1983) ISBN 0-912515-04-X, by Gerard Klug, based on the film.
- Dr. No (1984), ISBN 0-912515-06-6, by Neil Randall, Gerry Klug, based on the book and film.
- You Only Live Twice (1984), ISBN 0-912515-08-2, by Neil Randall, Gerry Klug, based on the film.
- Live and Let Die (1984), ISBN 0-912515-09-0, based on the book and film.
- Goldfinger II: The Man with the Midas Touch (1985), ISBN 0-912515-12-0, by Robert Kern - sequel to the Goldfinger adventure
- The Man with the Golden Gun (1985), ISBN 0-912515-13-9, by Brian H. Peterson, Gerry Klug, based on the film.
- A View to a Kill (1985), ISBN 0-912515-35-X, by Gerard Christopher Klug, based on the film
- You Only Live Twice II: Back of Beyond (1986), ISBN 0-912515-41-4, by Raymond Benson, Gerry Klug - sequel to the You Only Live Twice adventure
- For Your Eyes Only (1986), ISBN 0-912515-43-0, by Robert Kern, Gerry Klug, based on the book and film
- On Her Majesty's Secret Service (1987), ISBN 0-912515-36-8, by David Spangler - four linked solitaire adventures, based on the book and film

=== Supplements ===
- Q Manual: The Illustrated Guide to the World's Finest Armory (October 1983) ISBN 0-912515-01-5 - Sourcebook detailing required equipment for a "00" agent
- Gamesmaster Pack (October 1983) ISBN 0-912515-05-8 - various tools including a Gamesmasters Screen with charts and other game-related references, extra Character Sheets and a set of cardboard character standees.
- For Your Information (1983) ISBN 0-912515-07-4 - Additional rules, as well as information on characters and equipment not included in the original rulebook or Q Manual.
- Thrilling Locations (June 1985) ISBN 0-912515-10-4 - detailing hotels, casinos, restaurants, and the Orient Express, with floorplans and NPCs.
  - Note: This supplement was included with the Basic Set in later publishings.
- Villains (1986), ISBN 0-912515-11-2, by Gerard Christopher Klug - 7 original major villains, and an updating of SMERSH for the modern day, including a new SMERSH adventure.

=== Board game ===
- James Bond 007 Assault! Game (1986) by Gerard Christopher Klug

=== International editions ===
The James Bond 007 RPG was also translated into French by Jeux Descartes. A Japanese edition was published by Hobby Japan in 1986. It was also translated into Spanish in May 1990 by Karl Walter Klobuznik and Moisés Prieto, and published in Spain by JOC International S.A.

Originally sold in the United States in box format, the Spanish version was published in a single hardcover book entitled James Bond 007, El Juego de Rol, just as Jeux Descartes had done two years earlier in the French edition. The French replaced James Talbot's original black-and-white drawings with stills from the Bond films (also in black and white). The Spanish edition also replaced the original illustrations, but this time with its own original illustrations. These were made by Luis Carlos Ximénez, who traced and inked most of the frames used in the French edition. The result was not appreciated by the players, which contributed to a decrease in the success of the game in Spanish-speaking countries. Joc Internacional also translated and published the Spanish editions of the adventures Panorama Para Matar (A View to a Kill) and Goldfinger.

The game was presented in Madrid at the Book Fair of the Retiro Park in May 1990 by its Spanish translator into Spanish, Karl Klobuznik and enjoyed great acceptance in the public, only that the illustrations of the basic book and the lack of continuity in the publication of various sequels and adventures caused that the interest by the game decayed with the time.

The Spanish version of the game was listed in the "recommended literature" database for kids, of Spain's Education Ministry.

== Reception ==
In Space Gamer No. 67, Aaron Allston felt that "Bond aficionados looking for a decent game will find it here. Gamemasters for practically any contemporary RPG should look into the Q Manual. And the price isn't bad. I give the game a qualified recommendation; it's a valid effort, and generally does what it set out to do."

Nick Davison reviewed James Bond 007 for Imagine magazine, calling it "An excellent game for those primarily interested in role-playing rather than combat. It is not recommended for more than three players and is best with less."

In Issue 83 of Dragon (March 1984), Tracy Hickman praised the game "because it captured, for me, the essence of James Bond." He found the writing in the 160-page rulebook "very readable" and lauded "an innovative layout which puts player information and gamemaster clarifications side by side." Hickman did find a few errors in the book, but "considering the total package", he found them easy to forgive. He concluded by saying, "the game system conveys all the sizzle of 007's world."

Bob Neville reviewed James Bond 007 for White Dwarf #57, giving it an overall rating of 6 out of 10, and stating that "As a complete system, the 007 game stands up quite well, with a real feeling of belonging to part of the Bond mythos being generated in play."

Larry DiTillio reviewed James Bond 007 for Different Worlds magazine and stated that "Overall I give 007 the highest marks as a game. It is easy and fun to play, and it simulates the Bond films (not the books, as fans know there is a big difference) excellently. Players could even play Bond himself with ease, using the stats provided [...] Most of all, the designers have instilled the flavor of Bond, the color, the dash, the improbable stunts, and the adventure we expect from the world of Bond. Moreover, since it works in a milieu that players can easily relate to, it is more vivid than most spy games on the market. Most of all, it is true to its subject, the designers state that it is not created to play hard-edged spy stories in the John Le Carre genre, it is Bond, plain and simple."

In Issue 34 of Abyss, Ian Hense called the game "surprisingly enjoyable ... a well-thought out game, with a workable system for character development and combat." Hense concluded, "If you enjoy the gadgets and glamour that is James Bond, this game is definitely for you."

In Issue 137 of Dragon (September 1988), Jim Bambra said the skills resolution system "while allowing for a wide variety of factors, relies on a lot of table checking." Despite that, Bambra concluded that the game was "a good, action-packed system that neatly captures the flavor of its subject.

In his 1990 book The Complete Guide to Role-Playing Games, game critic Rick Swan wondered why this game hadn't garnered a larger audience, writing, "Why James Bond never attracted the audience it deserved remains one of gaming's biggest mysteries. ... [it] stands as one of the most exciting and inventive RPGs every published, a masterful effort." Swan concluded by giving the game an excellent rating of 3.5 out of 4, saying, "no spy game surpasses James Bond in excitement and wittiness, and none is more skillfully designed."

In a 1996 retrospective review in the British games magazine Arcane, James Swallow recalled that "The James Bond 007 roleplaying game had exactly the same sort of instantly playable background that, say, Star Wars does. It had 'M', 'Q', Moneypenny, Oddjob, Jaws, Goldfinger and Scaramanga. It even had the infamous Pussy Galore! What more need be said?" Later the same year, Arcane published a reader poll to determine the 50 most popular role-playing games of all time. James Bond 007 was ranked 46th. Arcane's's editor Paul Pettengale commented: "Because of the subject matter, and because the rules are easy to get to grips with, this proved to be an instant hit. It has also been backed up with a couple of cracking supplements – Thrilling Locations and the Q Manual - which makes creating all manner of interesting scenarios an absolute breeze."

In his 2023 book Monsters, Aliens, and Holes in the Ground, RPG historian Stu Horvath noted, "Owing to its embrace of the effortless heroism of Mary Sues and Marty Stus, Bond is designed for small group; it never says so explicitly, but the rules are well-suited for duet play — one player and a GM. That arrangement shouldn't be that surprising coming from a company that specialized in two-player wargames, but the game does shine a spotlight on individual characters (and puts more pressure on the player) in a way that most RPGs do not."

== Awards ==
At the 1984 Origins Awards, James Bond 007 won the H.G. Wells Award for "Best Roleplaying Rules of 1983".

At the 1984 Strategists' Club Awards, James Bond 007 won "Outstanding Role-Playing Game of 1983".

== See also ==
- Outline of James Bond
