= For Your Information (James Bond 007) =

For Your Information is a 1984 role-playing game supplement for James Bond 007 published by Victory Games.

== Contents ==
For Your Information is a supplement which contains information for the gamemaster such as preparing missions, developing characters, selecting campaigns, and random generation of adventures.

== Reception ==
Craig Sheeley reviewed For Your Information in Space Gamer No. 70. Sheeley commented that "Overall, I was disappointed with For Your Information. If you want everything concerning the James Bond 007 game, then you might consider buying this supplement. Otherwise, it's not worth the steep price."

Bob Neville reviewed For Your Information for White Dwarf #59, giving it an overall rating of 3 out of 10, and stated that "Whilst For Your lnformation is undoubtedly a useful addition to the 007 GM, the only piece of real interest is the booklet."
