= James Bond 007 Assault! Game =

James Bond 007 Assault! Game is a 1986 board game published by Victory Games based on the James Bond 007 role-playing game.

== Gameplay ==
James Bond 007 Assault! Game is a game in which the featured combat system is designed around four distinct scenarios, all inspired by the rocket base assault sequence from the James Bond film You Only Live Twice.

== Publication history ==
James Bond 007 Assault! Game was written by Gerard Christopher Klug and published by Victory Games in 1986 as a boxed set including a 20-page book, large map, "range stick", counters, counter tray, and dice.
