= A View to a Kill (song) =

1985 single by Duran Duran

- Artwork for the UK single

Single by Duran Duran

from the album A View to a Kill (soundtrack)
- B-side: "A View to a Kill" (That Fatal Kiss)
- Released: 6 May 1985
- Recorded: Early 1985
- Studio: Maison Rouge; CTS (London)
- Genre: Synth-pop; new wave
- Length: 3:37 (single version)
- Label: EMI; Capitol
- Songwriters: Duran Duran; John Barry
- Producers: Bernard Edwards; Jason Corsaro; Duran Duran

Duran Duran UK singles chronology
"The Wild Boys" (1984)	"A View to a Kill" (1985)	"Notorious" (1986)

Duran Duran US singles chronology
"Save a Prayer" (1985)	"A View to a Kill" (1985)	"Notorious" (1986)

James Bond theme singles chronology
"All Time High" (1983)	"A View to a Kill" (1985)	"The Living Daylights" (1987)

Music video
- "A View to a Kill" on YouTube

Audio sample
- file; help

"A View to a Kill" is a song by the English pop rock band Duran Duran, released on 6 May 1985. Written and recorded as the theme for the James Bond film of the same name and included on its accompanying soundtrack album, it became one of the band's biggest hits. It is the only James Bond theme song to have reached number one on the US Billboard Hot 100; it also made it to number two for three weeks on the UK singles chart while stuck behind Paul Hardcastle's "19". The song was the last track recorded by the most well-known lineup of Duran Duran until their reunion in 2001 and was also performed by the band at Live Aid in Philadelphia in 1985, their final performance together before their first split.

The following year, composer John Barry and Duran Duran were nominated for the Golden Globe Award for Best Original Song at the 43rd Golden Globe Awards for "A View to a Kill". Following Barry's death in 2011, the band paid tribute to him for their encore at the Coachella Festival later that year, with Simon Le Bon reappearing in a tuxedo for a pared-down version backed by an orchestra, before launching into the familiar full-band hit version. Bassist John Taylor introduced the song by saying, "We lost a dear friend of ours this year. A great English composer familiar to Hollywood, his name was John Barry. We're gonna play this for him."

== Background ==
The song was written by Duran Duran and John Barry, and recorded at Maison Rouge Studio and CTS Studio in London with a 60-piece orchestra.

Duran Duran were chosen to do the song after bassist John Taylor (a lifelong James Bond fan) approached producer Cubby Broccoli at a party and somewhat drunkenly asked, "If I give you a fiver, can I write a theme tune, please?" The band was then introduced to Bond composer John Barry, and also composer/producer Jonathan Elias (with whom Duran Duran members would later work many times). An early writing meeting at Taylor's flat in Knightsbridge led to everyone getting drunk instead of composing.

== Composition ==
Singer Simon Le Bon said of Barry: "He didn't really come up with any of the basic musical ideas. He heard what we came up with and he put them into an order. And that's why it happened so quickly because he was able to separate the good ideas from the bad ones, and he arranged them. He has a great way of working brilliant chord arrangements. He was working with us as virtually a sixth member of the group, but not really getting on our backs at all."

Due to a clear separation of areas of responsibility, the cooperation between band and composer turned out to be largely harmonious. The band was in charge of the actual songwriting while Barry created the final arrangement, including the orchestral parts.

== Release ==
"A View to a Kill" was completed in April 1985 and released that May. In the UK, it entered the UK Singles Chart at No. 7 before peaking at No. 2 the following week, and remained at that position for three weeks. In the US, it entered the charts at No. 45, and on 13 July it reached number one on the Billboard Hot 100 chart. It remains the only Bond theme to achieve this chart placing.

The B-side of the single was an instrumental piece orchestrated by Barry with a flute solo by Susan Milan that incorporates the melody of the Duran Duran song, titled "A View to a Kill (That Fatal Kiss)", which appeared on the A View to a Kill soundtrack album as "Bond Meets Stacey (A View to a Kill)".

== Reception ==
Cash Box described the single as "a memorable and dynamic cut and easily one of Duran Duran's very best efforts" that is "melodically strong" and employs "highly sophisticated state of the art production". Reviewing singles for Smash Hits, Stephen Duffy wrote: "Quite stunning production. Producer Bernard Edwards seems to have superseded Nile Rodgers in every direction. Takes a long time to get to the hook, but very interesting." As of October 2021 "A View to a Kill" was the seventh most streamed Duran Duran song in the UK.

== Music video ==
The song's music video was filmed in the Eiffel Tower and was directed by the duo of Godley & Creme. The video opens with the iconic gun barrel sequence and is centered around the scene from the film where Max Zorin (Christopher Walken)'s henchwoman May Day (Grace Jones) kills private detective Achille Aubergine (Jean Rougerie) in front of James Bond (Roger Moore) at the Tower. It then cuts to the band walking by the Tower on a secret mission: Simon Le Bon, disguised as a tourist, wearing a gray trench coat and carrying a Walkman; John Taylor, a long-haired tourist dressed in black; Nick Rhodes, a photographer working with a top model (Gail Elliott); Andy Taylor, a blind accordionist who plays the Bond theme on the accordion; and Roger Taylor, a supervisor inside a van. The band's actions coincide with events shown from the movie, while Bond pursues May Day through the Tower, culminating in her escape via parachute. The video ends with a beautiful young girl approaching Le Bon to question him, "Excuse me... aren't you?", where he breaks the fourth wall to say, "Bon. Simon Le Bon." However, her moving Le Bon's arm to talk to him causes him to accidentally activate a detonator concealed inside his Walkman, blowing up a postcard of the Eiffel Tower on a stand in front of the actual Tower.

== Track listing ==
=== UK 7-inch (EMI, Duran 007) ===
A: "A View to a Kill" – 3:37
B: "A View to a Kill (That Fatal Kiss)" – 2:31

- Also released in a gatefold sleeve (DURANG 007). Released by Capitol in US as B-5475. Reissued on CD in Singles Box Set 1981–1985 (2003).

Note:

- An unreleased 12-inch remix of the song was made by producers Steve Thompson and Michael Barbiero. According to Thompson, "The mystery [is] solved. I did this mix with Mike Barbiero and the band was there except John. We did that mix in a studio in Paris. All [the] sounds of the mix were done with the band. [...] I could never understand why the mix didn't come out. And yes I brought it to [alternative New York radio station] WLIR because we were all friends of the station and I would always give them exclusives."

== Personnel ==
Duran Duran

- Simon Le Bon – vocals
- Andy Taylor – guitars
- John Taylor – bass
- Roger Taylor – drums
- Nick Rhodes – keyboards

Technical

- Bernard Edwards – co-producer
- Jason Corsaro – co-producer, engineer, mixing
- Duran Duran – co-producer
- John Barry – orchestral arranger, conductor
- John Elias – digital sampling

== Charts ==
=== Weekly charts ===
Weekly chart performance for "A View to a Kill"
Chart (1985–1986)	Peak position
Australia (Kent Music Report)	6
Austria (Ö3 Austria Top 40)	6
Belgium (Ultratop 50 Flanders)	2
Belgium (VRT Top 30 Flanders)	1
Canada Top Singles (RPM)	1
Denmark (Hitlisten)	1
France (SNEP)	11
Ireland (IRMA)	2
Israel (Israeli Singles Chart)	1
Italy (Musica e dischi)	1
Netherlands (Dutch Top 40)	3
Netherlands (Single Top 100)	3
New Zealand (Recorded Music NZ)	13
Norway (VG-lista)	2
South Africa (Springbok Radio)	4
Spain (AFYVE)	4
Spain Airplay (Top 40 Radio)	1
Sweden (Sverigetopplistan)	1
Switzerland (Schweizer Hitparade)	7
UK Singles (Official Charts)	2
US Billboard Hot 100	1
US Cash Box Top 100	1
West Germany (GfK)	9
Zimbabwe (ZIMA)	6

=== Year-end charts ===
Year-end chart performance for "A View to a Kill"
Chart (1985)	Position
Australia (Kent Music Report)	64
Austria (Ö3 Austria Top 40)	27
Belgium (Ultratop 50 Flanders)	16
Canada Top Singles (RPM)	24
Israel (Israeli Singles Chart)	7
Netherlands (Dutch Top 40)	9
Netherlands (Single Top 100)	15
Switzerland (Schweizer Hitparade)	16
UK Singles (OCC)	34
US Billboard Hot 100	35
US Cash Box Top 100	19
West Germany (Official German Charts)	34

== Certifications and sales ==
Region	Certification	Certified units/sales
Canada (Music Canada)	Gold	50,000^{^}
United Kingdom (BPI)	Silver	250,000^{^}
United States	—	149,000
^{^} Shipments figures based on certification alone.

== In popular culture ==
DJ's Factory, a Eurodance project of German producer Bülent Aris and British keyboarder Adrian Askew, released a dancefloor-oriented version of the song in summer 1985, reaching No. 22 on the German single charts.

In 1987, Shirley Bassey covered the song for her album The Bond Collection, which contained her renditions of Bond theme songs. However, she wasn't satisfied with the quality, so the album was withdrawn from sale.

In 2008, the song was covered in a bossa nova style by former Morcheeba singer Skye on the various artists compilation album Hollywood, Mon Amour, containing cover versions of songs from 1980s films.

Måns Zelmerlöw performed a live version of the song at the beginning of the Andra Chansen (Second Chance) round of Melodifestivalen 2010 in Örebro, Sweden.

Further cover versions of the song have been recorded by the Welsh alternative metal band Lostprophets as a b-side of their 2002 single "The Fake Sound of Progress", Canadian punk rock band Gob on The Duran Duran Tribute Album in 1997, Australian band Custard, on the tribute album The Songs of Duran Duran: UnDone (1999), and the Chilean heavy metal band Los Mox, on their album ...Con Cover (2006). Finnish melodic death metal band Diablo has covered the song as a b-side of their 2005 single "Mimic47", as well as Finnish symphonic metal cover supergroup Northern Kings on their 2008 album Rethroned. Jay Gonzalez of Drive-By Truckers covered the song in a bossa nova style on the various artists compilation album Songs, Bond Songs: The Music of 007 (2017).

In 2016, Duran Duran performed the song live at the unveiling of the 2016 Mazda MX-5 (ND).

== See also ==
- James Bond music
- Outline of James Bond
