= Live and Let Die (adventure) =

Role-playing game supplement

Cover art by James Talbot

Live and Let Die is a licensed adventure published by Victory Games in 1984 for the espionage role-playing game James Bond 007.

== Description ==
Live and Let Die is a boxed set containing a 64-page book of the adventure, an 8-page plan booklet, a cardstock gamemaster's screen, and an envelope with 8 sheets of player handouts.

=== Plot summary ===
The adventure is based on the plot of the movie Live and Let Die. The player characters are investigating the murder of three MI6 operatives in New York and New Orleans. The adventure takes the player characters from New York to New Orleans to the Caribbean to meet the mysterious oracle Solitaire and to confront Mr. Big.

=== Book contents ===
The 64-page book is divided into five parts:

1. Introduction and Briefing: The team's briefing, and equipment provided by Q
2. Non-Player Characters: All significant personalities the players will meet
3. Places, Events and Encounters: The details of the adventure
4. Adventure Information: The consequences of success or failure, as well as possible modifications that can be added to the adventure
5. Cities for James Bond: Details of New York City and New Orleans

== Publication history ==
Victory Games, a division of Avalon Hill, acquired the license to create a role-playing game based on the James Bond movie franchise, and published James Bond 007 in 1983. The game was supported by many adventures and supplements, including 1984's Live and Let Die, a boxed set designed by Gerard Christopher Klug, with artwork by Ted Koller and James Talbot.

== Reception ==
In Issue 24 of Imagine, Nick Davison warned that this was a tough scenario, where "even experienced players with longstanding characters may need help." Nonetheless, Davison recommended the adventure, saying it was, "Well worth the extra money."

Steve Crow reviewed Live and Let Die in Space Gamer No. 76. Crow commented that "[the price] is more than worth it to get this module. Its plot, which deals with drug smuggling as opposed to the usual James-Bond-ish world-shattering brink-of-destruction events, makes it more suitable for adaptation to other secret agent roleplaying games than Victory's other modules."

== Awards ==
At the 1985 Origins Awards, Live & Let Die won "Best Roleplaying Adventure of 1984".
