= Dr. No (adventure) =

Dr. No is a 1984 role-playing game adventure for James Bond 007 published by Victory Games.

== Plot summary ==
Dr. No is an adventure in which the player characters look for a missing agent in Jamaica and become the targets of the plans of Dr. No.

== Reception ==
Steve Crow reviewed Dr. No in Space Gamer No. 71. Crow commented that "Be assured that you are getting your money's worth."

== Reviews ==
- Jeux et Stratégie #55
