= Dr. Know (TV series) =

Dr. Know is a program dedicated to debunking various rumours and popular misconceptions in the realm of personal health. The show featured Dr. Paul Trotman, a New Zealand physician in fields such as internal medicine and obstetrics/gynecology, who is described by one reviewer as a "medical myth buster". The show aired in 20 parts as a half-hour format on The Discovery Health Channel. In 2008, the series began airing on Science Channel. It is filmed in and around Washington, D.C.

== Cast ==
- Paul Trotman...Host
- Manny Oliverez...Lab Rat
- Christian Arriola...Lab Rat
