= Dragonroar =

Fantasy role-playing game

- Cover art by Peter Dennis
- Publishers: Standard Games
- Publication: 1985
- Genres: Role-playing

Dragonroar is a fantasy role-playing game published by Standard Games in 1985 that was the first of its kind published in the UK.

== Description ==
Dragonroar is an introductory level miniatures-oriented fantasy system, emphasizing combat between heroes and monsters. The game includes a rulebook, an introductory adventure, 25mm-scale floor plans, and a cassette tape introducing the game (side one) and the scenario (side two).

The centre of the rulebook contains a map of "Home" (the Dragonroar campaign world). Each character in Dragonroar can either be a Warrior or Wizard, and has statistics measured as five characteristics: Strength, Speed, Willpower, Knowledge and Endurance. Characters can gain honour points, which players can use to improve the characters and advance their Life Level. The skills system is organized into a series of hierarchies which become increasingly specialized as the player character progresses on a hierarchy.

== Publication history ==
Standard Games was best known for the board wargame Cry Havoc (1981), but like many game publishers, decided to enter the lucrative role-playing game market in the mid-1980s. Dragonroar was designed by Peter O'Toole and was published by Standard in 1985 as a boxed set with cover art by Peter Dennis. It contained a rulebook, a cassette tape, 24 character/monster sheets, four cardstock sheets, cardstock miniatures, a scenario map, and dice. Dragonroar was the first significant original fantasy role-playing game from the UK.

== Reception ==
In Issue 68 of the British games magazine White Dwarf, Paul Mason felt that "As a beginner's game, Dragonroar is clear and simple, but narrow in scope and restricting to those who want more out of game than combat: experienced role-players will find it about five years out of date. It may be the first British fantasy rolegame, but it isn't anything to be proud of." Mason concluded by giving the game a rating of 5 out of 10.

In Issue 32 of the French games magazine Jeux & Stratégie, Fabrice Cayla noted, "Let's point out right away, before saying more, that humor and simplicity are in the spotlight in Dragon Roar." Cayla concluded, "this game, with a very professional presentation, is aimed primarily at very young people for its simplicity; or to those who either want to play 'not very seriously', or parody a certain game."

In Issue 83 of the British magazine Computer and Video Games, Wayne B. Gamer commented "[Standard Games has] come up with a product which is simple to play, easy to learn and very enjoyable." Gamer liked the included cassette, noting, "The cassette is very well recorded and includes everything from interesting sound effects to a nifty piece of music, which bides your time whilst you get everything together." Gamer concluded, "So, if you are contemplating entering the fantastic world of Fantasy Role Playing, Dragonroar is definitely the game for you."

In his 2023 book Monsters, Aliens, and Holes in the Ground, RPG historian Stu Horvath noted the presence of war hedgehogs and killer penguins, and commented, "Not everything is going to be a classic. Sometimes the absurd deserves a little celebration. Dragonroar is pretty absurd." Horvath concluded, "The hell with orcs, give me a fantasy world full of homicidal mutant penguins and giant ax-wielding hedgehogs any day."
