= A View to a Kill =

1985 James Bond film by John Glen

- Theatrical release poster by Dan Gouzee
- Directed by: John Glen
- Screenplay by: Richard Maibaum; Michael G. Wilson
- Based on: James Bond by Ian Fleming
- Produced by: Albert R. Broccoli; Michael G. Wilson
- Starring: Roger Moore; Tanya Roberts; Grace Jones; Patrick Macnee; Christopher Walken
- Cinematography: Alan Hume
- Edited by: Peter Davies
- Music by: John Barry
- Production companies: Eon Productions; United Artists
- Distributed by: MGM/UA Entertainment Co. (United States); United International Pictures (International)
- Release dates: 15 May 1985 (New York, premiere); 24 May 1985 (United States); 13 June 1985 (United Kingdom)
- Running time: 131 minutes
- Countries: United Kingdom; United States
- Language: English
- Budget: $30 million
- Box office: $152.4 million

A View to a Kill is a 1985 spy film, the fourteenth in the James Bond series produced by Eon Productions, and the seventh and final appearance of Roger Moore as the fictional MI6 agent James Bond. Although the title is adapted from Ian Fleming's 1960 short story "From a View to a Kill", the film has an original screenplay. In A View to a Kill, Bond is pitted against Max Zorin (played by Christopher Walken), who plans to destroy California's Silicon Valley.

The film was produced by Albert R. Broccoli and Michael G. Wilson, who also wrote the screenplay with Richard Maibaum. It was the third James Bond film to be directed by John Glen, and the last to feature Lois Maxwell as Miss Moneypenny.

Despite receiving negative reviews from critics, who criticised the ageing Moore's performance, and Moore's own dislike of the film, it was a commercial success. The Duran Duran theme song "A View to a Kill" performed well in the charts, becoming the only Bond theme song to reach number one on the Billboard Hot 100 and earning a Golden Globe nomination for Best Song. The film was followed by The Living Daylights in 1987, with Timothy Dalton playing Bond.

== Plot ==
MI6 agent James Bond is sent to Siberia to locate the body of 003 and recover a Soviet microchip. Q analyzes this, establishing it to be a copy of one designed to withstand an electromagnetic pulse, made by government contractor Zorin Industries. Bond visits Ascot Racecourse to observe the company's owner, Max Zorin. Sir Godfrey Tibbett, a racehorse trainer and MI6 agent, believes Zorin's horses, which win consistently, are drugged, although tests proved negative. Through Tibbett, Bond meets French private detective Achille Aubergine, who informs him that Zorin is holding a horse sale later in the month. During their dinner at the Eiffel Tower, Aubergine is killed by Zorin's bodyguard May Day, who subsequently escapes.

Bond and Tibbett travel to Zorin's estate for the horse sale. Bond is puzzled by a woman who rebuffs him and discovers that Zorin has written her a cheque for $5 million. That night, Bond and Tibbett infiltrate Zorin's laboratory, where he is implanting adrenaline-releasing devices in his horses. Zorin identifies Bond as an agent, has May Day murder Tibbett, and attempts to have Bond killed. General Gogol of the KGB confronts Zorin for trying to kill Bond without permission, revealing that Zorin was initially trained and financed by the KGB, but has now gone rogue. Later, Zorin unveils his plan to destroy Silicon Valley to a group of investors, which will give them a monopoly over microchip manufacture.

Bond travels to San Francisco and meets CIA agent Chuck Lee, who tells him of medical experimentation that involved administering steroids to pregnant women - almost all aborted but the babies that survived were psychotic geniuses. This was performed by Dr. Carl Mortner, a Nazi scientist snatched at the end of World War II by the USSR - he is now Zorin's veterinarian and racehorse-breeding consultant. Bond surmises that Zorin was one of those babies.

Bond then investigates a nearby oil rig owned by Zorin, and while there finds KGB agent Pola Ivanova recording conversations and her partner placing explosives on the rig. Ivanova's partner Klottoff is caught and killed, but she and Bond escape. Later, Ivanova takes the recording but finds that Bond had switched tapes.

Bond tracks down State Geologist Stacey Sutton, the woman Zorin attempted to pay off, and discovers that he is trying to buy her family oil business. The two travel to San Francisco City Hall to check Zorin's submitted plans. Having been alerted to their presence and killed Lee, Zorin kills the Chief Geologist and sets fire to the building to frame Bond for the murder and kill him. Bond and Stacey flee from the police in a fire engine.

Infiltrating Zorin's mine, Bond and Stacey discover his plot to detonate explosives beneath the lakes along the Hayward and San Andreas faults, which will cause them to flood and submerge Silicon Valley. A larger bomb is also in the mine to destroy a "geological lock" that prevents the two faults from moving simultaneously. Once in place, Zorin and his security chief Scarpine flood the mine and kill the workers. Stacey escapes while Bond fights May Day; after realising Zorin abandoned her, she helps Bond remove the larger bomb, putting the device onto a handcar and riding it out of the mine, where it explodes and kills her.

Escaping in his airship with Scarpine and Mortner, Zorin abducts Stacey while Bond grabs hold of the airship's mooring rope. Zorin tries to knock him off, but Bond moors the airship to the framework of the Golden Gate Bridge. Stacey attacks Zorin to save Bond and, in the fracas, Mortner and Scarpine are temporarily knocked out. Stacey flees and joins Bond out on the bridge, but Zorin follows them out with an axe. The ensuing fight between Zorin and Bond culminates with Zorin falling to his death. Mortner attempts to kill Bond with dynamite but Bond cuts the airship free, causing Mortner to drop the dynamite in the cabin, blowing up the airship and killing himself and Scarpine. Later, Gogol awards Bond the Order of Lenin for foiling Zorin's scheme.

== Cast ==
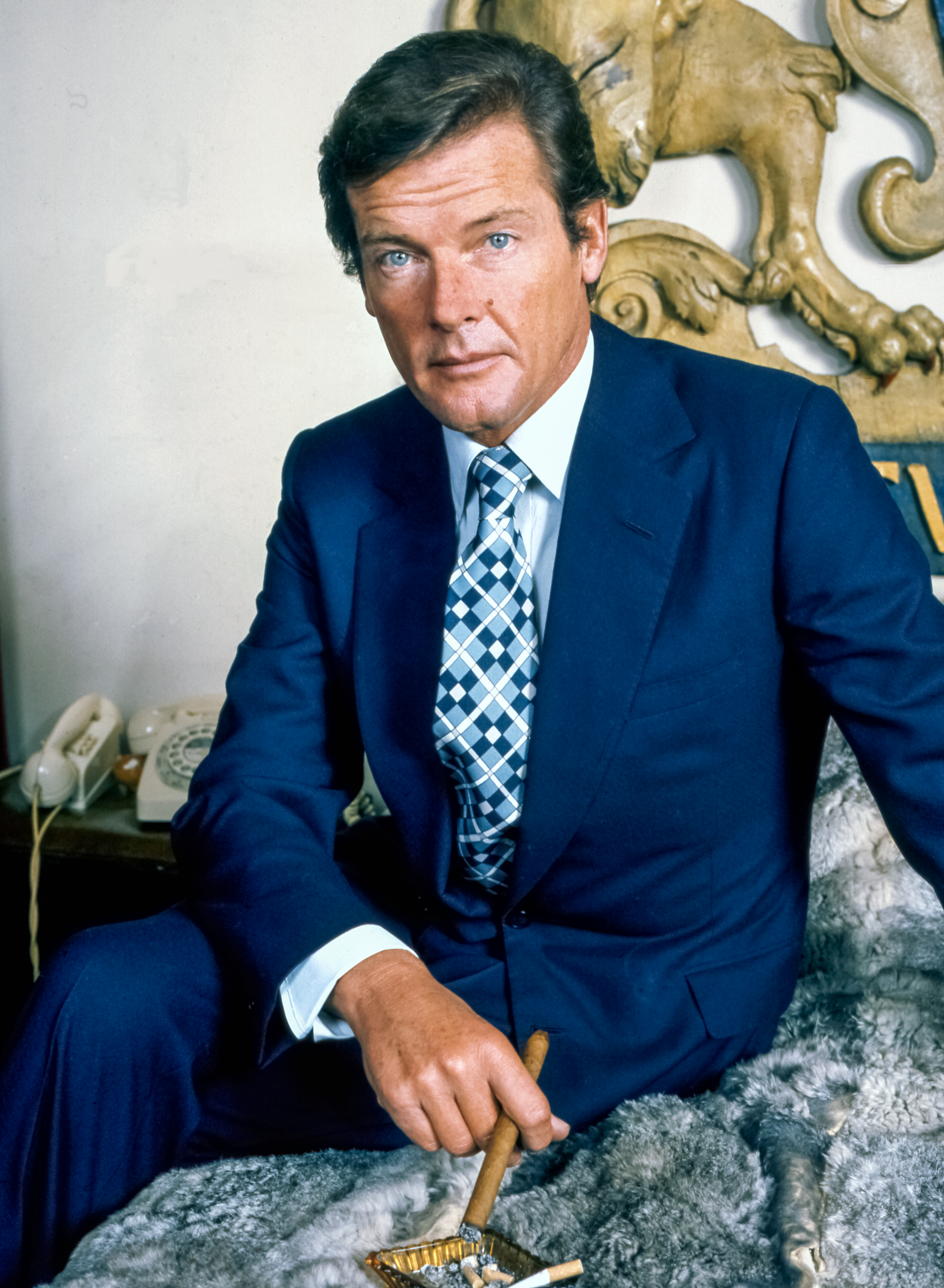
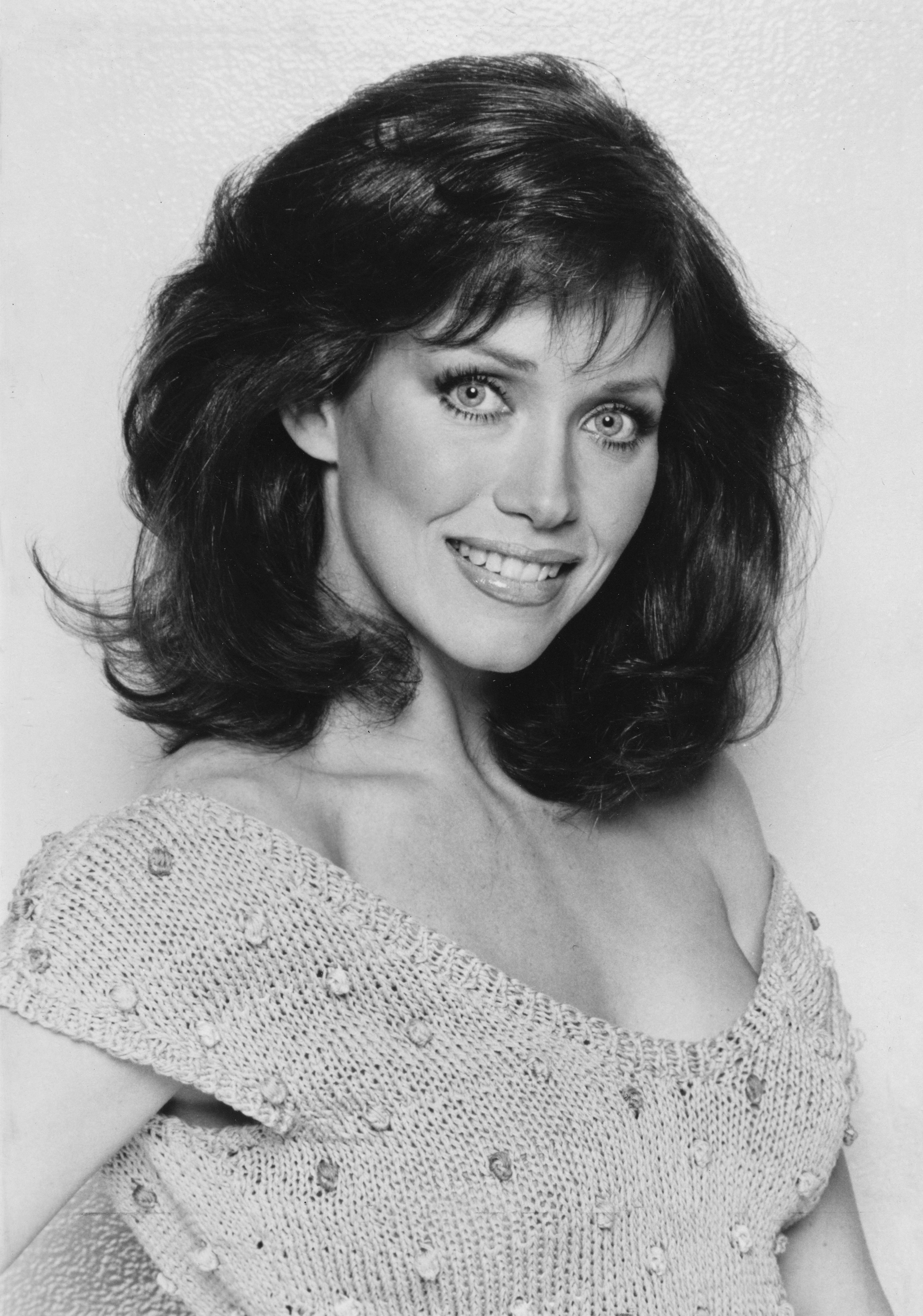
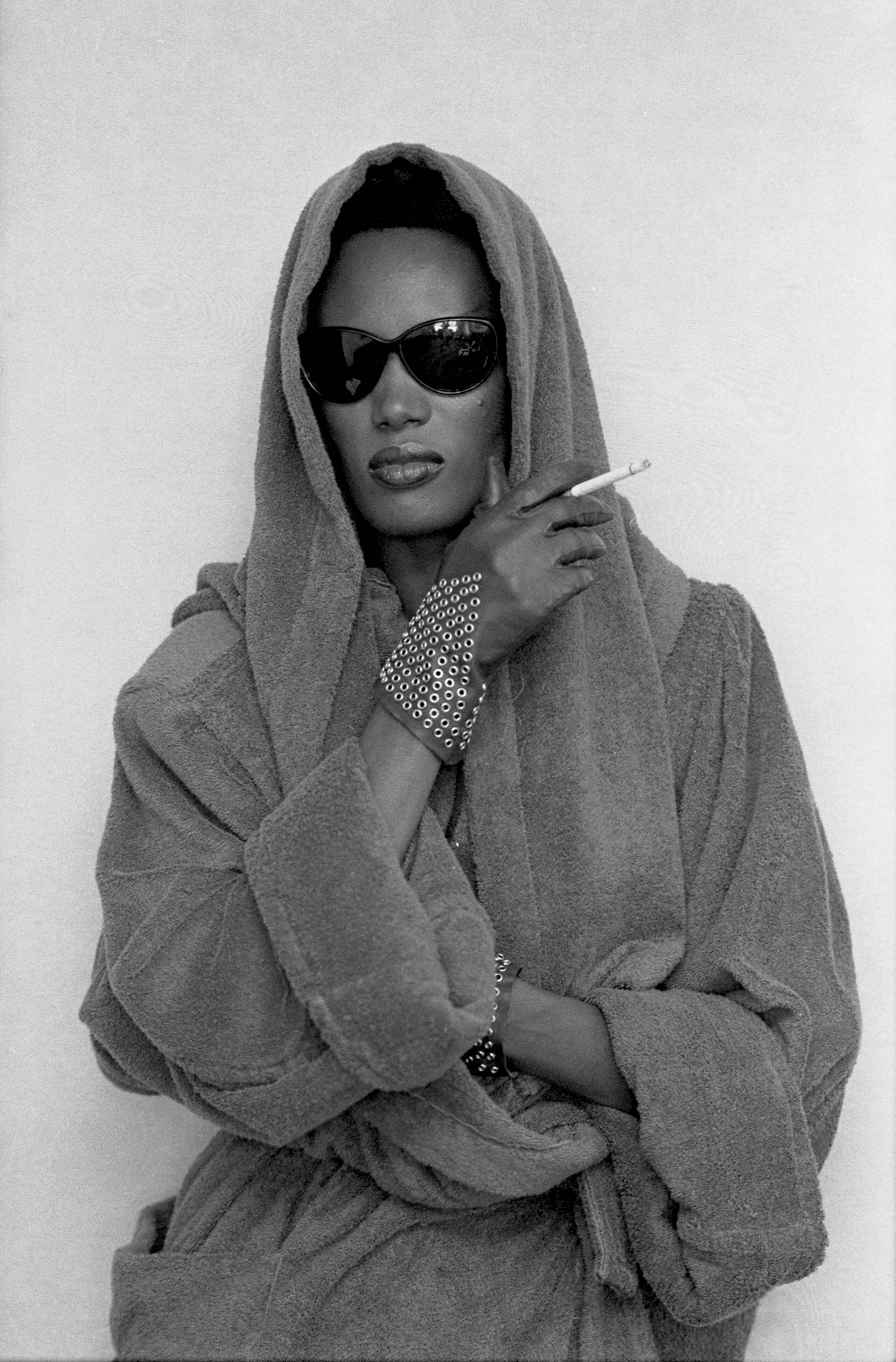
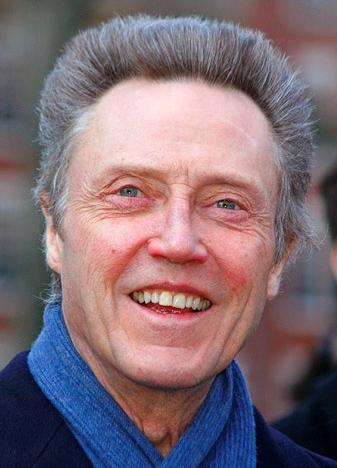
Roger Moore (far left) in 1973, Tanya Roberts in 1980, Grace Jones in 1984 and Christopher Walken in 2008
- Roger Moore as James Bond, MI6 agent 007
- Tanya Roberts as Stacey Sutton, the granddaughter of an oil tycoon whose company is taken over by Zorin.
- Grace Jones as May Day, Zorin's lover and chief henchwoman.
- Patrick Macnee as Sir Godfrey Tibbett, Bond's ally, a horse trainer who helps him infiltrate Zorin's chateau and stables.
- Christopher Walken as Max Zorin: a psychopathic industrialist, the product of a Nazi genetic experiment, who plans to destroy Silicon Valley to gain a monopoly in the microchip market.
- Patrick Bauchau as Scarpine, Zorin's murderous loyal associate.
- Willoughby Gray as Dr. Karl Mortner, formerly Hans Glaub, a Nazi scientist and father figure to Zorin (in the German release version, he is a Polish communist).
- David Yip as Chuck Lee, a CIA agent who assists Bond and Sutton in San Francisco.
- Desmond Llewelyn as Q, an MI6 officer in charge of the research and development branch. He supplies 007 with his equipment for his mission.
- Robert Brown as M, the head of MI6.
- Walter Gotell as General Anatoly Gogol, the head of the KGB.
- Lois Maxwell as Miss Moneypenny, M's secretary.
- Geoffrey Keen as Frederick Gray (credited as Minister of Defence), the British Minister of Defence.
- Manning Redwood as Bob Conley, Zorin's chief mining engineer who handles his oil interests on the East Bay.
- Alison Doody as Jenny Flex, one of May Day's assistants who is often seen with Pan Ho.
- Papillon Soo Soo as Pan Ho, one of May Day's assistants.
- Fiona Fullerton as Pola Ivanova, a KGB agent known to Bond, sent by Gogol to spy on Zorin.
- Jean Rougerie as Achille Aubergine, a French private detective.
- Mary Stävin as Kimberly Jones, an MI6 agent who assists Bond on his mission to Siberia.

Daniel Benzali also appears as Stacey's boss, Mr Howe. Bogdan Kominowski and Dolph Lundgren are Klotkoff and Venz, KGB henchman. Joe Flood portrayed the San Francisco police captain. Carole Ashby appeared as the butterfly act performer. Anthony Chinn was the Taiwanese tycoon. Maud Adams filmed a cameo as an extra in the background of a Fisherman's Wharf scene, making her third Bond film appearance.

== Production ==
Along with the other stories in Ian Fleming's 1960 anthology For Your Eyes Only, the original short story "From a View to a Kill" was originally envisioned as an episode of an abandoned 1958 CBS James Bond television series. A View to a Kill was produced by Albert R. Broccoli and Michael G. Wilson. Wilson also co-authored the screenplay along with Richard Maibaum. Broccoli initially wanted to rehire George MacDonald Fraser from Octopussy to co-write the screenplay but he was unavailable. Originally Maibaum's script included Zorin manipulating Halley's Comet into crashing into Silicon Valley, but Wilson insisted on a more realistic plot. At the end of Octopussy, the "James Bond Will Return" sequence listed the next film as "From a View to a Kill", the name of the original short story, but later the title was changed. When a company with a name similar to Zorin (the Zoran Corporation) was discovered in the United States, a disclaimer was added to the start of the film affirming that Zorin was not related to any real-life company. This is the first Bond film to have a disclaimer (The Living Daylights had a disclaimer about the use of the Red Cross).

=== Casting ===
Roger Moore had originally signed a three-film contract with Eon Productions, (Live and Let Die in 1973, The Man with the Golden Gun in 1974 and The Spy Who Loved Me in 1977) which was fulfilled. Moore's following three films (Moonraker in 1979, For Your Eyes Only in 1981 and Octopussy in 1983) were negotiated on a film-by-film basis. Uncertainty surrounding his involvement in Octopussy in 1983 led to other actors being considered to take over but Moore was convinced to come back as he was competing against Sean Connery in Never Say Never Again. Eon convinced Moore to do A View to a Kill but he announced in December 1985, 6 months after the release of A View to a Kill, that he would retire from the role after seven films.

Early publicity for the film in 1984 included an announcement that David Bowie would play Zorin. He initially accepted the role, but later decided against it, saying "I didn't want to spend five months watching my stunt double fall off cliffs." The role was then offered to Sting, who turned it down, and finally to Christopher Walken.

Priscilla Presley was originally going to be cast as Stacey Sutton, but she had to be replaced by Tanya Roberts because of her contract with Dallas. The original script had Barbara Bach reprising her role as Major Anya Amasova from 1977's The Spy Who Loved Me. However, Bach declined the role, and so an entirely new character, Pola Ivanova, was created, played by Fiona Fullerton.

Patrick Macnee, as Bond's ally Tibbett, became the fourth former star of The Avengers television series to appear in a Bond film (following Honor Blackman, Diana Rigg and Joanna Lumley); Macnee had also portrayed Dr. Watson to Roger Moore's title character for Sherlock Holmes in New York, nine years prior. David Yip's character Chuck Lee was originally scripted as Felix Leiter, but he was rewritten into a new Asian-American character in order to capitalize on the setting of San Francisco.

Dolph Lundgren has a brief appearance as one of General Gogol's KGB agents. Lundgren, who was dating Grace Jones at the time, was visiting her on set when one day an extra was missing, so the director John Glen then asked him if he wanted to attempt the role. Lundgren appears during the confrontation between Gogol and Zorin at the racetrack, standing several steps below Gogol.

=== Filming ===
Production of the film began on 23 June 1984 in Iceland, where the second unit filmed the pre-title sequence. On 27 June 1984, several leftover canisters of petrol used during filming of Ridley Scott's Legend caused Pinewood Studios' 007 Stage to burn to the ground. The stage was rebuilt, and reopened in January 1985 (renamed as Albert R. Broccoli's 007 Stage) for filming of A View to a Kill. Work had continued on other stages at Pinewood when Roger Moore rejoined the main unit there on 1 August 1984. The crew then departed for shooting the horse-racing scenes at Royal Ascot Racecourse. The scene in which Bond and Sutton enter the mineshaft was then filmed in a waterlogged quarry near Staines-upon-Thames and the Amberley Chalk Pits Museum in West Sussex.

Principal photography began with the horse racing scenes at Ascot Racecourse on 1 August 1984. The film was shot at Pinewood Studios in London, Iceland, Switzerland, France and the United States with the budget initially being $35 million. Several French landmarks such as the Eiffel Tower, its Jules Verne restaurant and the Château de Chantilly were filmed. The rest of the major filming was done at Fisherman's Wharf, Dunsmuir House, San Francisco City Hall and the Golden Gate Bridge in San Francisco. The Lefty O'Doul Bridge was featured in the fire engine chase scene.

On 6 October 1984, the fourth unit, headed by special effects supervisor John Richardson, began its work on the climactic fight sequence. At first, only a few plates constructed to resemble the Golden Gate Bridge were used. Later that night, shooting of the burning San Francisco City Hall commenced. The first actual scenes atop the bridge were filmed on 7 October 1984.

In Paris it was planned that two stunt parachutists, B.J. Worth and Don Caldvedt, would undertake two jumps from a platform that extended from a top edge of the Eiffel Tower. However, sufficient footage was obtained from Worth's jump, so Caldvedt was told he would not be performing his own descent. Caldvedt, unhappy at not being able to perform the jump, parachuted off the tower without authorisation from the City of Paris. He was subsequently sacked by the production team for jeopardising the continuation of filming in the city.

Airship Industries managed a major marketing coup with the inclusion of its Skyship 500 series blimp in the film. At the time Airship Industries was producing a fleet of blimps which were recognisable over many capitals of the world offering tours, or advertising sponsorship deals. The blimp seen in the climax was then on a promotional tour of Los Angeles after its participation in the opening ceremony of the 1984 Summer Olympics. At that time, it had "Welcome" painted across the side of the gasbag, but was replaced by "Zorin Industries" for the film. During the summer of 1984, the blimp was used to advertise Fujifilm. In real life, inflating the airship would take up to 24 hours, but during the film it was shown to take two minutes. Despite filming going over schedule by two weeks, the production was completed $5 million under budget at $30 million according to John Glen. Filming was completed on 16 January 1985.

== Music ==
The soundtrack was composed by John Barry and published by EMI/Capitol. The theme song, "A View to a Kill", was written by Barry and Duran Duran, and performed by the band. "May Day Jumps" is the only track that uses the "James Bond Theme". Barry's composition from On Her Majesty's Secret Service was modified for use in the songs "Snow Job", "He's Dangerous" and "Golden Gate Fight" of A View to a Kill. "A View to a Kill" reached number two on the UK Singles Chart and number one on the Billboard Hot 100 in the United States, thus becoming the peak song in the James Bond series. The 2015 track Writing's on the Wall later out performed the song in the UK by reaching number one.

Duran Duran was chosen to do the song after bassist John Taylor, a Bond fan, approached producer Albert Broccoli at a party, and drunkenly asked "When are you going to get someone decent to do one of your theme songs?"

During the opening sequence, a cover version of the 1965 Beach Boys song "California Girls", performed by tribute band Gidea Park with Adrian Baker, is used during a chase in which Bond snowboards; it has been suggested that this sequence helped initiate interest in snowboarding.

== Release and reception ==
This was the first Bond film with a premiere outside the UK. There was a special screening on 15 May 1985 at D. W. Griffith Theater in New York City. The film opened on 22 May 1985 at San Francisco's Palace of Fine Arts. The British premiere was held on 12 June 1985 at the Odeon Leicester Square cinema in London. It achieved a box office gross of US$152.4 million worldwide. In the United Kingdom, the film grossed £8.1 million ($13.6 million). On its opening weekend in the US and Canada it grossed $13.3 million from 1,583 theaters over the four-day Memorial Day weekend, the biggest opening for a Bond film at the time, but not enough to beat Rambo: First Blood Part II which was number one for the weekend with a gross of $25.2 million from 2,074 theaters. It went on to gross $50.3 million in the United States and Canada. Other large international grosses include $11.7 million in Germany, $9.1 million in Japan and $8.2 million in France.

Although its box office reception was excellent, the film's critical response was mostly negative. One of the most common criticisms was that Roger Moore was 57 at the time of filming—and that he had visibly aged in the two years that had passed since Octopussy. Washington Post critic Paul Attanasio said, "Moore isn't just long in the tooth—he's got tusks, and what looks like an eye job has given him the pie-eyed blankness of a zombie. He's not believable anymore in the action sequences, even less so in the romantic scenes—it's like watching women fall all over Gabby Hayes." Sean Connery declared that "Bond should be played by an actor 35, 33 years old. I'm too old. Roger's too old, too!" In a December 2007 interview, Roger Moore remarked, "I was only about four hundred years too old for the part."

Moore also said that, at the time, A View to a Kill was his least favourite Bond film, and mentioned that he was mortified to find out that he was older than his female co-star's mother. He was quoted as saying, "I was horrified on the last Bond I did. Whole slews of sequences where Christopher Walken was machine-gunning hundreds of people. I said 'That wasn't Bond, those weren't Bond films.' It stopped being what they were all about. You didn't dwell on the blood and the brains spewing all over the place".

Pauline Kael of The New Yorker said, "The James Bond series has had its bummers, but nothing before in the class of A View to a Kill. You go to a Bond picture expecting some style or, at least, some flash, some lift; you don't expect the dumb police-car crashes you get here. You do see some ingenious daredevil feats, but they're crowded together and, the way they're set up, they don't give you the irresponsible, giddy tingle you're hoping for." Kael also singled out the dispirited direction and the hopeless script. "Director John Glen stages the slaughter scenes so apathetically that the picture itself seems dissociated. (I don't think I've ever seen another movie in which race horses were mistreated and the director failed to work up any indignation. If Glen has any emotions about what he puts on the screen, he keeps them to himself.)"

However, not all reviews were negative. Lawrence O'Toole of Maclean's called the film "an especially satisfying encounter. Opening with a breathtaking ski chase in Siberia, A View to a Kill is the fastest Bond picture yet. Its pace has the precision of a Swiss watch and the momentum of a greyhound on the track." Although O'Toole believed that Moore was showing his age in the role, "there are plenty of tunes left in his violin. James Bond is still a virtuoso, with a licence to thrill."

Brian J. Arthurs of The Beach Reporter said it was the worst film of the Bond series. Chris Peachment of the Time Out Film Guide said, "Grace Jones is badly wasted." Norman Wilner of MSN also chose it as the worst Bond film, while IGN picked it as the fourth-worst, while Entertainment Weekly ranked it as the fifth-worst.

Danny Peary had mixed feelings about A View to a Kill but was generally complimentary: "Despite what reviewers automatically reported, [Moore] looks trimmer and more energetic than in some of the previous efforts[...] I wish Bond had a few more of his famous gadgets on hand, but his action scenes are exciting and some of the stunt work is spectacular." Peary wrote that the film "lacks the flamboyance of earlier Bond films, [...] but overall it's fast-paced, fairly enjoyable, and a worthy entry in the series."

Also among the more positive reviews was Movie Freaks 365's Kyle Bell: "Good ol' Roger gave it his best. ... Whether you can get past the absurdity of the storyline, you can't really deny that it has stunning stunt work and lots of action. It's an entertaining movie that could have been better." Walken was also praised by online critic Christopher Null for portraying a "classic Bond villain". Bond historian John Brosnan believed A View to a Kill was Moore's best Bond entry. He said Moore looked in better shape than the previous Bond film, Octopussy. Brosnan, an airship enthusiast, especially admired the dirigible finale.

Neil Gaiman reviewed A View to a Kill for Imagine magazine, and stated that "When Grace Jones went to bed with Moore, I was sure the producers had hit upon a way to kill the old fellow off with dignity, but when Bond was seen wandering around fresh as a daisy the next morning I realised how escapist this all is. Unless he just rolled over and went to sleep, of course, which is what I was strongly tempted to do."

John Nubbin reviewed A View to a Kill for Different Worlds magazine and stated that "There is a fierce pride in what is going on in A View to a Kill that has been missing in the Bond series for a long time. Roger Moore has fought since the first picture for just this kind of an end result. Looking over the Bonds he has been in, one could see this end result coming. If Moore hadn't kicked and complained the way he did, every one of them might have been as dreadful as The Man with the Golden Gun. Luckily, British determination won out in the end. For all those people who swore they'd never enjoy a Roger Moore Bond film, here's an open invitation to stop at my house for a big plate of crow - mine was delicious."

Roberts was nominated for a Golden Raspberry Award as Worst Actress, but she lost the trophy to Linda Blair, who appeared in Night Patrol, Savage Island and Savage Streets.

On Rotten Tomatoes, the film has an approval rating of 36% based on reviews from 61 critics, which is the lowest rating for the Eon-produced Bond films on the website. The site's critical consensus reads: "Absurd even by Bond standards, A View to a Kill is weighted down by campy jokes and a noticeable lack of energy." On Metacritic, the film has a score of 40% based on reviews from 20 critics, indicating "mixed or average reviews".

== Other media ==
This film was adapted into two video games in 1985. The first, titled A View to a Kill, was published by Domark. It was available for the ZX Spectrum, Amstrad CPC, Commodore 64, Oric 1 and Oric Atmos, and MSX. The second, titled James Bond 007: A View to a Kill was a text adventure for the Apple II and IBM PC compatibles. It was developed by Angelsoft and published by Mindscape.

The film was loosely adapted into a series of four Find Your Fate adventure gamebooks: Win, Place, or Die; Strike it Deadly; Programmed for Danger; and Barracuda Run, which were released in 1985.

Furthermore, a tabletop role-playing game adventure for the James Bond 007 game system was released under the film's name.

May Day was a playable multiplayer character in the 1997 and 2000 video games GoldenEye 007 and 007: The World Is Not Enough for the Nintendo 64. In the 2002 game Nightfire, May Day and Max Zorin also appear as bots. Other references include Nikolai Diavolo, a character in the 2004 game James Bond 007: Everything or Nothing, claiming Zorin to be his mentor and friend. In GoldenEye: Rogue Agent, a multiplayer level is the summit of the Golden Gate Bridge, including the Zorin blimp, which would fire on players when activated. Players are also able to climb the suspension cables (similar to the events of the film).

== See also ==
- List of films shot in Iceland
- Outline of James Bond
