= Q Manual: The Illustrated Guide to the World's Finest Armory =

Tabletop role-playing game supplement

Cover art, 1983

Q Manual: The Illustrated Guide to the World's Finest Armory is a supplement published by Victory Games in 1983 for the James Bond 007 role-playing game.

== Contents ==
In 1983, Victory Games, a branch of Avalon Hill, published the James Bond 007 role-playing game based on Ian Fleming's spy novels and the popular movies. Q Manual, designed by Greg Gorden, with equipment illustrations by Stuart Leuthner and other artwork by James Talbot, was published the same year to provide further detail for the game.

The 148-page book purports to be a catalogue of equipment considered essential for a "00" agent, with added comments about each item by "Q". (In the novels and movies, "Q" is the code name of the armorer for the British Secret Service.) Equipment includes weapons; vehicles; common devices such as umbrellas and attache cases that could contain hidden weapons or other equipment; surveillance devices; "exotic" devices such as Oddjob's hat from Goldfinger; and poisons, drugs and chemicals. Some details of the secretive Q Branch and some of its members are included.

== Reception ==
In the February 1984 edition of Imagine (Issue 11), Nick Davison wrote: "The Q Manual is clearly an essential aid to the basic game. It contains not only a wealth of equipment, but also background on Q branch and its members (some of which are not in the films)." He liked the range of equipment as well as the accurate illustrations and concluded that it was perhaps a bit expensive but still worth the money: "Perhaps the colour stills from the films upped the price a little; beyond that, a valuable companion."

In the March 1984 edition of Dragon (Issue 83), Tracy Hickman wrote: "Even without the game, the Q Manual is a treat." He liked the "almost conversational way that each piece of equipment is discussed" and concluded: "If you play any type of espionage role-playing game, the equipment descriptions will be a valuable resource...this is a great daydreaming book for any Bond fan."

Anders Swenson reviewed Q Manual for Different Worlds magazine and stated that "if you are a 007 gamemaster, you have probably already purchased this volume, and if not, it would be worthwhile, as it is an useful addition to the rules. For gamemasters using other systems, the Q Manual contains a lot of lore which could be of use in a campaign, but its purchase should depend on the affordability of its price tag."

In the October 1984 edition of White Dwarf (Issue #58), Bob Neville wrote: "With even the famous Aston Martin DB-V detailed, the Q Manual is a very good value addition to the game, the catch being that it is almost essential for playing 007 satisfactorily." He gave the supplement an excellent overall rating of 9 out of 10.

== Other reviews ==
- Heroes (Vol. 1, No. 3 and No. 4)
- Casus Belli #21 (Aug. 1984)
- Jeux & Stratégie #56 (as "Le Manuel du Service Q")
