= The Man with the Golden Gun (adventure) =

Tabletop role-playing game adventure

- Designers: Brian H. Peterson
- Publishers: Victory Games
- Publication: 1985; 40 years ago
- Genres: Spy fiction
- Systems: James Bond 007

The Man with the Golden Gun is a 1985 role-playing game adventure for James Bond 007, written by Brian H. Peterson, and published by Victory Games. It included a gamemaster's screen.

== Plot summary ==
The Man with the Golden Gun is an adventure in which the player characters must stop a scientist who is trying to defect to the Soviet Union. It is based on the movie of the same name.

== Reception ==
Steve Crow reviewed The Man with the Golden Gun in Space Gamer No. 76. Crow commented that "All in all, The Man with the Golden Gun ranks up there in the top three of the eight 007 modules, along with Live and Let Die and Octopussy. It's best as a head-to-head adventure, with a skilled (very skilled) '00' agent. Interesting, well-developed characters and a plot set up to handle almost any contingency make playing a real pleasure."

== See also ==
- The Man with the Golden Gun - the 1974 movie that the adventure is based on.
