= Thrilling Locations =

Spy fiction tabletop role-playing game supplement

- Publishers: Victory Games
- Publication: 1985; 41 years ago
- Genres: Spy fiction
- Systems: James Bond 007

Thrilling Locations is a 1985 Spy fiction tabletop role-playing game supplement for James Bond 007 published by Victory Games. Originally published as a separate supplement, it was later included with the boxed Basic Set for the game.

== Contents ==
Thrilling Locations is a supplement which deals with the types of locales commonly featured in James Bond stories, such as casinos, hotels, restaurants, trains, boats, and planes; it also includes game statistics for non-player characters and random encounters appropriate for these places.

== Reception ==
Steve Crow and William A. Barton did a point/counterpoint review of Thrilling Locations in Space Gamer No. 76. Crow commented that "Thrilling Locations is an excellent buy, not only for James Bond 007 players but for those who play Top Secret, Mercenaries, Spies & Private Eyes, or any other secret-agent RPG." Barton commented that "Maybe I just expect too much of Victory Games, but Thrilling Locations is a disappointment."

Bob Neville reviewed Thrilling Locations for White Dwarf #71, giving it an overall rating of 7 out of 10, and stated that "On the whole, I have very few quibbles about this supplement and would whole-heartedly recommend it to other Bond GMs."

== Reviews ==
- Game News #10 (Dec., 1985)
- Dragon #137
- Isaac Asimov's Science Fiction Magazine v10 n11 (1986 11)
