= DragonRaid =

Tabletop role-playing game

- Cover
- Designers: Dick Wulf
- Publishers: Adventures for Christ
- Publication: 1984
- Genres: High fantasy, Christian apologetics, Pedagogy
- Systems: Custom

DragonRaid is a Christian discipleship learning game set in a fantasy world. DragonRaid was created by Dick Wulf in 1984 and revived in 2018 by Lightraider Academy (Lightraider Christian Fantasy) under Christian author James R. Hannibal. It is generally considered a role-playing game, although the game's owners describe it as a hybrid using elements of a role playing game and elements of a choose-your-adventure-style Bible study. Its primary focus is to help Christians understand and nurture the fruit of the Spirit and grow in their understanding of the Bible and its daily application.

== Description ==
Using an allegorical fantasy RPG setting, players are able to play the roles of Keledan (Twiceborn) Lightraiders and practice biblical principles in a group setting. The fantasy backdrop (called Dastan or EdenAgain) is similar to J. R. R. Tolkien's Arda and C. S. Lewis' Narnia.

It uses a mechanical system called the Adventure Learning System, and is the only role-playing game to use that system. In the ALS system, the rule set used by the game master (called the "Adventure Master") to operate the environment and non-player characters is significantly different from the rule set used by the players to operate their personal characters. In particular, enemies roll a smaller die than the players (d8 versus d10), making it more likely that PCs will succeed in their actions than their antagonists. This also has the effect of making random failure more likely for NPCs than for PCs, as the lowest value on an eight-sided die comes up 12.5% of the time, compared to 10% of the time for a ten-sided die. This advantage to players allows the Adventure Master to more easily teach the specific biblical principles that are the focus of each adventure.

The ludic experience is included in a pastoral or religious education frame. The Adventure Master is intended to be a figure of authority (father/mother, youth leader, Bible study group leader). The game design introduced different resolution rules for the player characters and for the non-player characters.

== Reception ==
In his 2023 book Monsters, Aliens, and Holes in the Ground, RPG historian Stu Horvath noted, "The most curious thing about DragonRaid is what amounts to the magic system, which is based on the idea of Word Runes, essentially Bible quotes that must be recited from memory to, well, create magical effects ... it is an extremely early example of the dialogue-as-mechanic ideas that would crop up in storytelling games and more narrative-based RPGs years later." However, Horvath pointed out, "DragonRaid was a failure ... Entrenched RPG players resented the game's blatant fundamentalist Christian themes ... and evangelical Christians thought it was misguided and ultimately just as evil as all the other role-playing games."

== Reception ==
The game has been criticized by role-players (for its overtly proselytizing content), and by Christian anti-role-playing groups like Bothered About Dungeons and Dragons. The website christiangaming.com similarly states that "DragonRaid became a victim of some well-meaning but mistaken Christian organizations that condemned it as having evil content".

== Revival of DragonRaid and Lightraider Academy ==
In 2018, Dick Wulf transferred DragonRaid to Christian author and game developer James R. Hannibal. Under the flags of Lightraider Academy and Lightraider Christian fantasy, new games and books, including new adventures for the original DragonRaid, are in development.

== Publications ==
=== DragonRaid ===
- The Lightraider Test, 1984
- The Rescue of the Sacred Scrolls, 1984
- The Moonbridge Raid Part One, 1986
  - The Moonbridge Raid campaign initiated a new style of map-based game play for DragonRaid. With the new style, players had more freedom of movement using a hexagon grid map. Adventure Masters led the story based on sector descriptions, with certain critical sectors.
- The Moonbridge Raid Parts Two and Three, 2020
  - Under James R. Hannibal, Lightraider Academy published the final two parts of the Moonbridge Raid to complete the campaign. These were produced in a visual style to match the original Moonbridge Raid Part One. The Moonbridge Raid Parts Two and Three continue the map-based play style initiated with Part One. They also add an "encounter" appendix to each part, allowing Adventure Masters the flexibility to provide additional game content pertinent to the main story line of the campaign and allowing the players to discover additional clues and secrets without being funneled into certain map sectors.

=== Lightraider Academy ===
==== Games ====
- First Watch
  - First watch is a Scripture memory and application card game that also serves as a reference tool for DragonRaid adventures. The verses memorized in the card game are also used in DragonRaid and in the Lightraider Academy trilogy of novels
- Starlots the Board Game
  - Starlots is a family board game based in the Lightraider/DragonRaid world slated to release during the summer of 2021

==== Stories ====
- Wolf Soldier (Lightraider Academy Book 1)
  - Wolf Soldier is book 1 of the Lightraider Academy trilogy set to release in October 2021 from the Escape imprint of Enclave Books.
- The Fountain and the Flame
  - In April 2021 Woodridge.org began carrying a monthly story set in the Lightraider world. Each chapter includes choices for readers to select, and the following chapter is written based upon the most popular selection. Chapter 1 was published on April 28, 2021.
