= For Your Eyes Only (short story collection) =

Collection of short stories by Ian Fleming

- First edition cover, published by Jonathan Cape
- Author: Ian Fleming
- Cover artist: Richard Chopping
- Language: English
- Series: James Bond
- Genre: Spy fiction
- Publisher: Jonathan Cape
- Publication date: 11 April 1960
- Publication place: United Kingdom
- Media type: Print (hardback and paperback)
- Preceded by: Goldfinger
- Followed by: Thunderball

For Your Eyes Only is a collection of short stories by Ian Fleming, and the eighth book to feature the fictional British Secret Service agent Commander James Bond. It was first published by Jonathan Cape on 11 April 1960. It marked a change of approach for Fleming, who had previously only written Bond stories as full-length novels.

The collection comprises five short stories: "From a View to a Kill", "For Your Eyes Only", "Quantum of Solace", "Risico" and "The Hildebrand Rarity". Three of the stories were adaptations of plots for a television series that was never filmed; Fleming had written the fifth previously but not published it. He undertook some minor experiments with the format, including one story written as an homage to W. Somerset Maugham, an author he greatly admired.

Reviews for the book were mixed, although several critics thought the short-story format suited Bond. Elements from the stories have been used in several Bond films, including the title of the 1981 film, For Your Eyes Only, starring Roger Moore as Bond. The film also used some elements and characters from the short stories "For Your Eyes Only" and "Risico". "From a View to a Kill" also gave part of its title (but no characters or plot elements) to the 1985 film, A View to a Kill and plot elements from "The Hildebrand Rarity" were used in the 1989 film, Licence to Kill. "Quantum of Solace" was used as the title for the twenty-second Bond film in 2008.

== Plots ==
=== "From a View to a Kill" ===
The Secret Service agent James Bond investigates the murder of a motorcycle dispatch-rider and the theft of his top-secret documents by a motorcycle-riding assassin. The rider was en route from the Supreme Headquarters Allied Powers Europe, then located in Versailles, to his base, Station F, in Saint-Germain in France. As Bond is already in Paris, his superior, M, sends him to assist in the investigation in any way he can. Bond disguises himself as a dispatch-rider and follows the same journey to Station F as the previous rider; as expected, the assassin attempts to kill him. Bond is ready for him and kills the assassin. He then uncovers the assassin's underground base of operations.

=== "For Your Eyes Only" ===
The Havelocks, a British couple living in Jamaica, refuse to sell their estate to Herr von Hammerstein, a former Gestapo officer who is the chief of counter-intelligence for the Cuban secret service. They are murdered by two Cuban hit-men at the direction of their leader, Major Gonzales; all three work for Hammerstein. The Havelocks are close friends of M, who served as the best man during their wedding. M gives Bond a voluntary assignment, unconnected to sanctioned Secret Service duties, to travel to Vermont via Canada, find Hammerstein at his rented estate at Echo Lake and assassinate him as a warning to future criminals who might think to target British citizens. When Bond arrives on the scene, he finds the Havelocks' daughter, Judy, who intends to carry out her own mission of revenge with a bow and arrow. Judy kills Hammerstein by shooting him in the back with an arrow from 100 yards (91 m) away at the exact moment that he dives into a lake. A shoot-out then occurs between Bond and Gonzales and the two Cuban gunmen. Bond kills all of them and returns to Canada with Judy, who has been slightly wounded during the gunfight.

=== "Quantum of Solace" ===
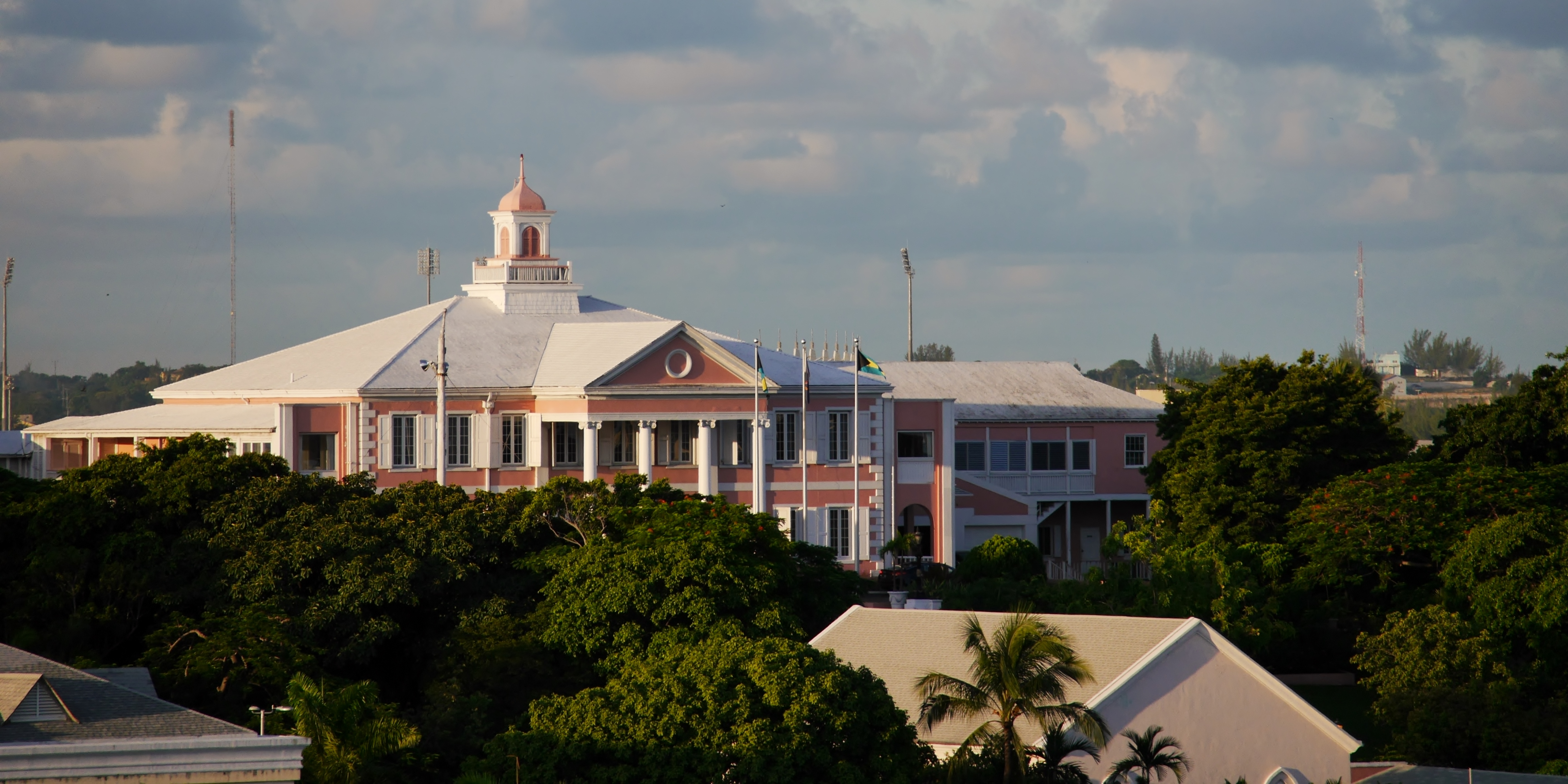
Government House, The Bahamas, where "Quantum of Solace" is based

After completing a mission in the Bahamas, Bond is in Nassau and attends a dinner party at Government House. When the other guests have left, Bond remarks that if he ever marries, he imagines it would be nice to marry an air hostess. The Governor then tells Bond the story of a relationship between the civil servant Philip Masters and the air hostess Rhoda Llewellyn. After meeting aboard a flight to London, the couple married, and went to live in Bermuda, but after a time Rhoda began a long open affair with the eldest son of a rich Bermudian family. As a result, Masters's work deteriorated, and he suffered a nervous breakdown. After recovering, he was given a break from Bermuda by the governor and sent on an assignment to Washington. Upon his return Masters was determined to end his marriage and he divided their home into two sections, half to each of them and refused to have anything to do with his wife in private—although they continued to appear as a couple in public. He eventually returned to the UK alone, leaving Rhoda with unpaid debts and stranded in Bermuda—a cruel act which he would have been incapable of carrying out just a few months earlier. The governor explains his point to Bond: when the "Quantum of Solace" drops to zero, humanity and consideration of one human for another is gone and the relationship is finished. Despite the success of Masters's plan to take revenge on his unfaithful wife, he never recovered emotionally. After a time, Rhoda married a rich Canadian. The governor then reveals that the dinner companions whom Bond found dull were Rhoda and her rich Canadian husband.

=== "Risico" ===
Bond is sent by M to investigate a drug-smuggling operation based in Italy that is sending narcotics to England. M instructs Bond to get in touch with a CIA informant, Kristatos, who in turn tells Bond that a man named Enrico Colombo is behind the racket. When Bond sets out to find more information on Colombo, he is captured and brought aboard Colombo's ship, Colombina. Colombo informs Bond that Kristatos is actually the one in charge of the drug smuggling operation, and that Kristatos is backed by the Russians. Colombo agrees to help Bond by providing information "as long as none of it comes back to Italy"; Bond agrees to help Colombo eliminate Kristatos. Bond, Colombo and his men sail Colombina to Santa Maria when Kristatos's men are loading another shipment of drugs. They attack Kristatos's ship and adjacent warehouse and discover Kristatos lurking near the warehouse, preparing to detonate a bomb. Kristatos tries to escape, but is killed by Bond.

=== "The Hildebrand Rarity" ===
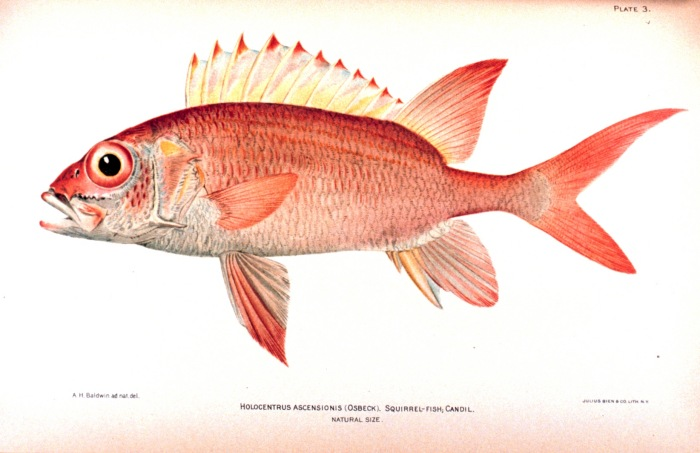
A squirrel-fish; the Hildebrand Rarity was a rare member of the species.

Bond is on an assignment in the Seychelles; through Fidele Barbey, his influential and well-connected local contact, he meets an uncouth American millionaire, Milton Krest, who challenges the two to aid him in the search for a rare fish, the Hildebrand Rarity. Bond, Barbey, Krest and his English wife Elizabeth set off aboard Krest's boat Wavekrest in search of the fish. During the journey, Bond learns that Krest verbally and physically abuses everyone around him, especially his wife—whom he punishes with the use of a stingray tail he dubs "The Corrector". Krest finds the Hildebrand Rarity and kills it—along with many other fish—by pouring poison into the water. Wavekrest sets sail for port. Along the way Krest gets very drunk, insults Bond and Barbey and tells his wife he will beat her again with the stingray tail. Later that night, Bond hears Krest choking; investigating, Bond finds that Krest has been murdered—apparently by having the rare fish stuffed down his throat. So as not to be entangled in a murder investigation, Bond throws Krest overboard and cleans up the scene of the crime, making it look as though Krest fell overboard after one of the ropes holding his hammock broke: Bond suspects both Barbey and Mrs Krest, but is unsure which is responsible. When Mrs Krest invites Bond to sail with her to Mombasa—his next destination—aboard the Wavekrest, he accepts her invitation with reservations.

== Background and writing history ==
In mid-1958 CBS television commissioned the author Ian Fleming to write episodes of a television show based on his Bond character. This deal came about after the success of the 1954 television adaptation of Casino Royale as an episode of the CBS television series Climax!. Fleming agreed to the deal and began to write outlines for the series, but CBS later dropped the idea.

By January 1959 Fleming had published six novels in the preceding six years. (Note: These were: Casino Royale (1953), Live and Let Die (1954), Moonraker (1955), Diamonds Are Forever (1956), From Russia, with Love (1957) and Dr. No (1958).) A seventh book, Goldfinger, was being edited and prepared for production; it was released at the end of March 1959. Once Fleming completed Goldfinger he thought he had exhausted his inspiration for plots. He told the writer William Plomer—his friend who proof-read all the Bond books—that the novel was to be "the last full length folio on Bond ... Though I may be able to think up some episodes for him in the future, I shall never be able to give him 70,000 words again".

Fleming travelled to his Goldeneye estate in Jamaica in January 1959, where he adapted three of the CBS television plots into short stories and added a fifth he had written in the summer of 1958. Fleming's biographer Andrew Lycett noted that at the time he was writing both the television scripts and the short story collection, "Ian's mood of weariness and self-doubt was beginning to affect his writing".

"From a View to a Kill" was initially intended to be the backstory for Hugo Drax, the villain of the novel Moonraker. The story would have taken place during the Second World War, and featured Drax as the motorcycle assassin who crashes his bike and is taken to an American field hospital. Later, the hospital is bombed, leaving Drax with amnesia and a disfigured face. The story was one that Fleming had drawn up for the television series. The original name for the story was "The Rough with the Smooth", which was also the original title of the book, before For Your Eyes Only was chosen for publication. "From A View to a Kill" was serialised in the Daily Express in September 1959 under the title "Murder Before Breakfast".

For "For Your Eyes Only" Fleming contacted the Bond enthusiast and gun expert Geoffrey Boothroyd for research about bows and arrows, which Fleming felt would be better in the natural setting. Boothroyd had previously advised Fleming on the type of gun Bond should be carrying. (Note: After corresponding with Boothroyd in 1956, Fleming changed Bond's gun from a .25 Beretta to a Walther PPK.) Early names for "For Your Eyes Only" were "Death Leaves an Echo" and "Man's Work". While it was still a possible television episode, it was to be called "Rough Justice", which was to be episode three of the series.

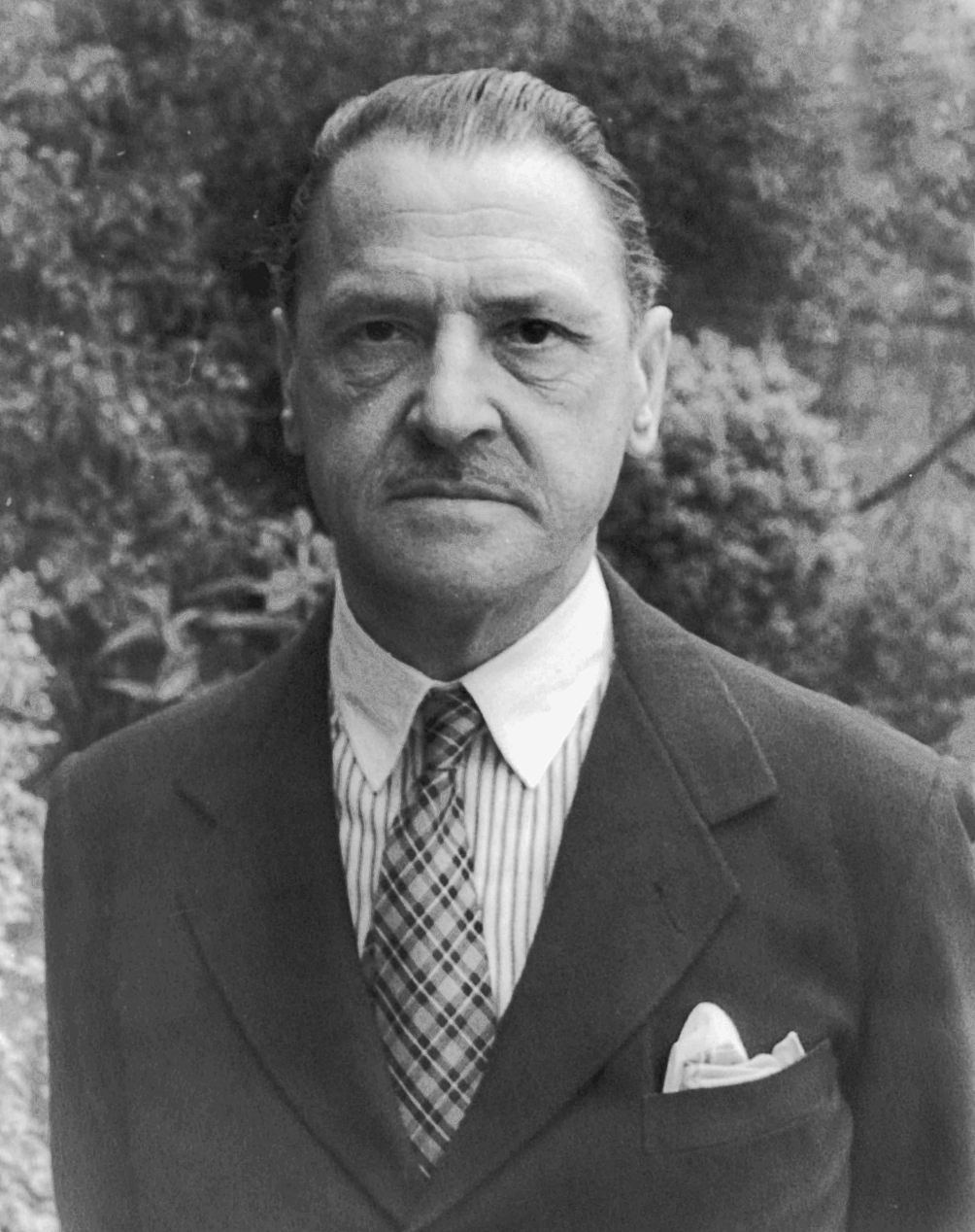
Somerset Maugham: Fleming was an admirer and paid homage to him with "Quantum of Solace"

"Quantum of Solace" was based on a story told to Fleming by his neighbour and lover Blanche Blackwell about a real-life police inspector, whom Fleming turned into the story's civil servant, Philip Masters. As thanks for the story, Fleming bought Blackwell a Cartier watch. Fleming wrote the story in the style of W. Somerset Maugham as an homage to a writer he greatly admired. An earlier title that was considered for "Quantum of Solace" was "Love Lies Bleeding". The story was first published in Modern Woman's Magazine in November 1959 under the title "A Choice of Love and Hate".

The original manuscript copy for "Risico" is titled "Risiko". The story was first published in the Daily Express in April 1960 under the name "The Double-Take". This was adapted from another idea from the planned television series.

In April 1958 Fleming flew to the Seychelles via Bombay to report for The Sunday Times on a treasure hunt; although the hunt was not as exciting as he hoped, Fleming used many of the details of the island for "The Hildebrand Rarity". Fleming combined the backdrop of the Seychelles with his and Blackwell's earlier experience in Pedro Keys, two islands off Jamaica, where they watched two scientists do something similar with poison to obtain samples. For the villain of the story, an abusive American millionaire, Fleming used the name Milton Krest: Milton was the code name of a Greek sea captain who ferried British soldiers and agents through German patrols and who received the Distinguished Service Order and an MBE, while Krest was the name of tonic and ginger beer Fleming drank in Seychelles. "The Hildebrand Rarity" was first published in Playboy in March 1960. It became the first magazine to publish a Bond short story; it began a long association between the publication and Bond. The story was also published in Today magazine in March 1960.

The collection For Your Eyes Only had two possible names before publication: The Rough with the Smooth and Man's Work; it was provisionally subtitled "Five Secret Occasions in the Life of James Bond". Although Fleming did not date the events within his novels, John Griswold and Henry Chancellor—both of whom wrote books for Ian Fleming Publications—have identified timelines based on episodes and situations within the novel series as a whole. Chancellor puts the events of all five episodes in For Your Eyes Only between 1957 and 1958. Griswold provides more exact estimates and considers "Risico" to have taken place between 15 and 18 October 1957; "Quantum of Solace" in February 1958; "The Hildebrand Rarity" in April 1958; "From a View to a Kill" in May 1958; and "For Your Eyes Only" in September and October 1958.

== Development ==
=== Plot inspirations ===
The underground hideout in "From a View to a Kill" was inspired by Fleming's brother Peter's band of Auxiliary Units who dug tunnel networks in Britain in 1940 as part of a resistance movement in advance of a German invasion. The secret service operative in Paris—Mary Ann Russell—is probably named after a former girlfriend, Maud Russell, according to Fleming's bibliographer, Jon Gilbert.

"For Your Eyes Only" was set in Vermont, where Fleming had spent a number of summers at his friend Ivar Bryce's Black Hole Hollow Farm, which became the model for Hammerstein's hideaway, Echo Lake. The name of the villain of the story, Hammerstein was taken from General Baron Kurt von Hammerstein-Equord (1878–1943), one of Hitler's opponents. When Mrs Havelock says "Somebody's gone and bought that ghastly Blue Harbour hotel", Fleming is having a joke at the expense of his friend and neighbour Noël Coward, who had a house in Jamaica called Blue Harbour, not far from Fleming's. The story's name comes from a stamp used in the Naval Intelligence Division to show the classification of secret documents; Fleming was a member of the unit during the war. In October 1959 Fleming wrote to his publishers "I rather like 'For Your Eyes Only'. This used to be stamped on secret papers in the early days of the war and is still occasionally in use."

"Quantum of Solace" takes its structure – an agent's private conversation with a high-ranking diplomat about socially unequal romance – from Maugham's short story "His Excellency". (Note: "His Excellency" is a story narrated by the British ambassador to Ashenden about how he turned down the love of his life—an acrobat—for a woman from his own class. He went on to his distinguished but dull career in the Foreign Office, but has always regretted his decision.) The story also provides a indication of the parlous state of Fleming's own marriage at the time of writing.

"Risico" was inspired by Fleming's love of Venice. In 1958 he holidayed with his wife Ann there and at the Lido island. Fleming was a great admirer of Thomas Mann's work Death in Venice, which is set on the Lido, and the Flemings visited it for that reason. Fleming used the location as the backdrop for the story. For the love interest in the story, Lisl, Fleming used the name of an ex-girlfriend from Kitzbühel in Austria, where he had travelled in the 1930s. For Colombo's name, Fleming borrowed the surname of Gioacchino Colombo, the Ferrari engine designer.

In addition to being inspired by his visit to the Seychelles in 1958, Fleming recalled a trip to two small islands off Jamaica he had made to observe a scientific expedition. He witnessed the scientists use the method of pouring poison into the water to obtain samples.

=== Characters ===
According to Raymond Benson—the author of the continuation Bond novels—two of the stories ("Quantum of Solace" and "The Hildebrand Rarity") are experimental in style for Fleming, while the remaining three are straightforward Bond adventures. In the two experimental stories Bond is given something of a more human side. In "Quantum of Solace" Bond's reaction to the Governor's story shows a compassionate side, as he sees the real life of Philip Masters and Rhoda Llewellyn as being more dramatic than his recent mission; the forthcoming trip he has to make to the CIA, he now sees as "dull and unexciting". In "The Hildebrand Rarity", Bond is also shown with a humanitarian side, with feelings for the plight of Liz at the hands of her husband and for the use of the poison on the fish by Milton Krest.

The sociologist Anthony Synnott observes that "For Your Eyes Only" provides information about Bond's moral code. With his stance against the evil that Hammerstein brings, Synnott sees Bond's decision as that of an honourable man making a morally good verdict based on his own code of values. When accepting M's request to take revenge for the murders of the Havelocks, Bond's thoughts are outlined by Fleming:

There were no doubts in Bond's mind. ... Hammerstein had operated the law of the jungle on two defenceless old people. Since no other law was available, the law of the jungle should be visited upon Hammerstein. In no other way could justice be done. If it was revenge, it was the revenge of the community.

An aspect of Bond's relationship with M is shown in "For Your Eyes Only": Bond takes the decision from M's shoulders about what should happen to the murderers the Havelocks; the scene also shows the reader about the weight of command and M's indecision as to what path to follow. The daughter of M's friends, Judy Havelock, is a tough and resourceful character, according to Benson, although after she has avenged her parents' death and is wounded, she softens and allows Bond to take up his usual role of protector.

In "From a View to a Kill" the SHAPE head of security, Colonel Schreiber, is described as having "the politely negative manner of a bank manager" and is shown as the antithesis of Bond, according to the historian Jeremy Black. Fleming describes him with greying hair, sitting at a desk with silver framed photographs of his family and a single white rose; the lack of colour in the description reflects Schreiber's lack of personality. The clash between the relaxed man of action (Bond) and an officious colleague was repeated in the 1962 short story "The Living Daylights".

The cultural critic Umberto Eco identifies the character of Enrico Colombo in "Risico" as an example of those characters who have morals closer to those of the traditional villains, but who act on the side of good in support of Bond; others of this type include Darko Kerim (From Russia, with Love), Tiger Tanaka (You Only Live Twice) and Marc-Ange Draco (On Her Majesty's Secret Service).

== Style ==
Within the James Bond series, Benson identifies what he described as the "Fleming Sweep", the use of "hooks" at the end of events to heighten tension and pull the reader into the next. In "From a View to a Kill" he sees the hooks being used to keep the pace of the story moving. The story, which he considers a morality tale, uses the flashback technique that Fleming liked.

The Fleming Sweep is also present in "For Your Eyes Only", and helps the story move between the various locations. Benson sees the story structured in the same way as the novels: a murder at the beginning, Bond being instructed by M, the introduction of the female character which complicates the plot and then ending with the shoot-out at the end.

== Themes ==
As it had in many of his previous works, the Second World War makes an appearance in some of the stories. Black observes that "Germans, in the wake of the Second World War, made ... [an] easy and obvious target for bad press." In For Your Eyes Only, Hammerstein is a former Gestapo officer, while the RCMP officer, Colonel Johns, served with the British under Montgomery in the Eighth Army, Krest is of German descent and Colombo fought for the British in the war. Fleming's prejudices against the Germans were summed up in "The Hildebrand Rarity": "The old Hun again. Always at your feet or at your throat".

Justice and revenge are themes that run through two of the stories. In "For Your Eyes Only" the idea of revenge is looked at from a number of angles: Bond's, M's and Judy Havelock's, and each has a different interpretation. Bond's approach to killing is also dissected in "For Your Eyes Only", while the morality of killing—both with the mass poisoning of fish and the murder of Krest—is a theme in "The Hildebrand Rarity".

The decline of Britain's position in the world is observed and commented upon in several of the stories and was a subject which was of concern to Fleming. Krest, while drunk, tries to rile Bond:

Nowadays, said Mr Krest, there were only three powers—America, Russia and China. That as the big poker game and no other country had either the chips or the cards to come into it. Occasionally some pleasant little country—and he admitted they'd been pretty big league in the past—like England would be lent some money so that they could take a hand with the grown-ups.

Decline re-appears in "Quantum of Solace" with the ambassador, who has worked "for thirty years while the Empire crumbled around him". In "For Your Eyes Only" the British residents in the colony of Jamaica are declining in number, either being bought out of their homes—being paid in United States dollars, rather than in sterling—or, like the Havelocks, being killed.

== Publication and reception ==
=== Publication history ===
For Your Eyes Only was published on 11 April 1960 in the UK as a hardcover edition by the publishers Jonathan Cape; it was 252 pages long and cost fifteen shillings. (Note: 15 shillings in 1960 is approximately equivalent to £20 in 2025, according to calculations based on the Consumer Price Index measure of inflation.) 21,712 copies were printed and quickly sold out. As he had done for many of Fleming's other Bond novels, the artist Richard Chopping provided the cover art for a fee of 50 guineas. (Note: A guinea was originally a gold coin whose value was fixed at twenty-one shillings (£1.05). By this date the coin was obsolete and the term simply functioned as a label for that sum. According to calculations based on the Consumer Price Index measure of inflation, 50 guineas in 1960 is approximately £1,050 in 2025.) The picture was based on an idea by Fleming and the eye appearing on the cover is supposed to be that of Bond. For Your Eyes Only was published in the US in August 1960 by Viking Press and the subtitle was changed to Five Secret Exploits of James Bond; in later editions, the subtitle was dropped altogether.

In May 1962 Pan Books published a paperback version of For Your Eyes Only in the UK that sold 226,000 copies before the end of the year and 441,000 in 1963. Since its initial publication the book has been re-issued in hardback and paperback editions, translated into several languages and, as at 2025, has never been out of print.

=== Critical reception ===
Several reviewers thought the short story format suited Bond: (Note: These include John Raymond in The Listener, Francis Iles in The Guardian, Maurice Richardson in The Observer, the unnamed critic for The Times and Anthony Boucher in The New York Times.) Francis Iles wrote in The Guardian that the structure was "better than the novels". One downside was that "if it checks the wilder fantasies it cuts short the love-affairs", according to The Observer's Maurice Richardson. The critic for The Times also felt for the female characters, the short form "allows them only walk-on parts".

Writing in The Listener, John Raymond said of the stories that "all but one ... are well up to 007's high standard"; James Sandoe, in the New York Herald Tribune, considered they had "urban savagery and mighty smooth tale-spinning". Philip Stead for The Times Literary Supplement thought "occasionally there seem to be echoes of Ashenden and glimpses of Rogue Male, but the Bond ambience is persuasive".

Writing in The New York Times, Anthony Boucher considered that "Bond's triumphs are too simple and lack ... intricate suspense", while Violet Grant at The Daily Telegraph thought "Every one of the five long-short stories ... makes it plain that James Bond has served his purpose and should be allowed a decent death".

Some reviewers noted a new mood in Bond, with the critic for The Times considering the character had "begun to have qualms"; both Richardson and Raymond believed Bond was mellowing with age. The result, considered Richardson, was that Bond was "less of a show-off". In The Spectator, Cyril Ray, writing under the pseudonym Christopher Pym, said that "our hero seems to have lost, as well as any claims to plausibility, the know-how, the know-who, know-what and sheer zing that used to carry the unlikely plots along".

== Adaptations ==
Four of the five short stories in For Your Eyes Only were adapted into comic strips published in the British newspaper Daily Express and subsequently syndicated around the world. The first three stories were "Risico", which ran between 3 April and 24 June 1961; "From a View to a Kill", which ran between 25 June and 9 September 1961; and "For Your Eyes Only", which ran between 29 May and 16 December 1961. They were adapted by Henry Gammidge and illustrated by John McLusky.

All three strips were published again in 2005 as part of the Dr. No anthology by Titan Books. The fourth adaptation, "The Hildebrand Rarity", did not appear until six years after the comic-strip versions of the other stories and it ran between 29 May and 16 December 1967. It was adapted by Jim Lawrence and illustrated by Yaroslav Horak. This adaptation was reprinted by Titan Books in 2009 as part of Volume 2 of the James Bond Omnibus collection.

A number of details from the story "For Your Eyes Only" are used in the film of the same name, released in 1981 and starring Roger Moore as James Bond. The film shows the murder of the Havelocks—a marine archaeologist and his wife—by a hit-man, although it names the hit-man as Gonzalez, rather than Gonzales. The film also changes the name of the Havelocks' daughter, Judy, to Melina. For Your Eyes Only also uses much of the plot of "Risico", including the characters of Colombo and Kristatos. Part of the title of the story From a View to a Kill was used for the 1985 Bond film A View to a Kill, although none of the story's plot was used in the film. Milton Krest, his foundation, Wavekrest and "the Corrector" were incorporated into the 1989 film Licence to Kill. Quantum of Solace was chosen as the title of the 22nd Bond film; none of the story was used for the film's plot. In the 2015 film Spectre, M and Bond meet in a London safe house, which carries a name plate labelled "Hildebrand Antiques and Rarities", a reference to "The Hildebrand Rarity".

== See also ==
- List of James Bond novels and short stories
- Outline of James Bond

== Notes and references ==
=== Sources ===
==== Books ====
- Amis, Kingsley (1966). The James Bond Dossier. London: Pan Books. OCLC 154139618.
- Barnes, Alan; Hearn, Marcus (2001). Kiss Kiss Bang! Bang!: the Unofficial James Bond Film Companion. London: Batsford Books. ISBN 978-0-7134-8182-2.
- Benson, Raymond (1988). The James Bond Bedside Companion. London: Boxtree. ISBN 978-1-85283-233-9.
- Besly, Edward (1997). Loose Change: A Guide to Common Coins and Medals. Cardiff: National Museum Wales. ISBN 978-0-7200-0444-1.
- Black, Jeremy (2005). The Politics of James Bond: from Fleming's Novel to the Big Screen. Lincoln, Nebraska: University of Nebraska Press. ISBN 978-0-8032-6240-9.
- Chancellor, Henry (2005). James Bond: The Man and His World. London: John Murray. ISBN 978-0-7195-6815-2.
- Fleming, Fergus (2015). The Man with the Golden Typewriter: Ian Fleming's James Bond Letters. New York: Bloomsbury. ISBN 978-1-6328-6489-5.
- Fleming, Ian (1962). For Your Eyes Only. London: Pan Books. OCLC 859004147.
- Fleming, Ian; Gammidge, Henry; McLusky, John (1988). Octopussy. London: Titan Books. ISBN 1-85286-040-5.
- Gilbert, Jon (2012). Ian Fleming: The Bibliography. London: Queen Anne Press. ISBN 978-0-9558-1897-4.
- Griswold, John (2006). Ian Fleming's James Bond: Annotations and Chronologies for Ian Fleming's Bond Stories. Bloomington, Indiana: AuthorHouse. ISBN 978-1-4259-3100-1.
- Hines, Claire (2018). The Playboy and James Bond: 007, Ian Fleming and Playboy Magazine. Manchester: Manchester University Press. ISBN 978-0-7190-8226-9.
- Lindner, Christoph (2009). The James Bond Phenomenon: A Critical Reader. Manchester: Manchester University Press. ISBN 978-0-7190-6541-5.
  - Bennett, Tony; Woollacott, Janet. "The Moments of Bond". In Lindner (2009), pp. 13–33.
  - Eco, Umberto. "The Narrative Structure of Ian Fleming". In Lindner (2009), pp. 34–55.
- Lycett, Andrew (1996). Ian Fleming. London: Phoenix. ISBN 978-1-85799-783-5.
- McLusky, John; Gammidge, Henry; Hern, Anthony; Fleming, Ian (2009). The James Bond Omnibus Vol.1. London: Titan Books. ISBN 978-1-84856-364-3.
- Parker, Matthew (2014). Goldeneye. London: Hutchinson. ISBN 978-0-09-195410-9.
- Pearson, John (1967). The Life of Ian Fleming: Creator of James Bond. London: Jonathan Cape. OCLC 923185831.

==== Journals and magazines ====
- Raymond, John (28 April 1960). "New Novels". The Listener. p. 767.
- Synnott, Anthony (Spring 1990). "The Beauty Mystique: Ethics and Aesthetics in the Bond Genre". International Journal of Politics, Culture, and Society. 3 (3): 407–26. doi:10.1007/BF01384969. JSTOR 20006960. S2CID 143938867.

==== Newspapers ====
- "Bond's Unsung Heroes: Geoffrey Boothroyd, the Real Q". The Daily Telegraph. 21 May 2009. Archived from the original on 24 September 2015.
- Boucher, Anthony (26 June 1960). "Criminals at Large". The New York Times. p. B25.
- Grant, Violet (14 April 1960). "Spies and Sleuths". The Daily Telegraph.
- Iles, Francis (29 April 1960). "Criminal Records". The Guardian. p. 11.
- MacIntyre, Ben (25 January 2008). "Fleming's Reflection on the Limitations of Love". The Times. p. 13.
- Richardson, Maurice (17 April 1960). "Crime Ration". The Observer. p. 20.
- "Short Stories". The Times. 21 April 1960. p. 15.
- Stead, Philip John (15 April 1960). "The Bond Ambience". The Times Literary Supplement. p. 246.

==== Websites ====
- Clark, Gregory (2023). "The Annual RPI and Average Earnings for Britain, 1209 to Present (New Series)". MeasuringWorth.
- "For Your Eyes Only". WorldCat.
- "Ian Fleming's James Bond Titles". Ian Fleming Publications. Archived from the original on 10 August 2015.
- Reynolds, Simon (26 October 2015). "13 Easter Eggs to Look Out for in Spectre". Digital Spy. Archived from the original on 12 October 2017.
- Tilly, Chris (28 January 2008). "Bond 22 Interview: Quantum of Solace producer Michael G. Wilson Speaks". IGN. Archived from the original on 1 February 2008.
