= A View to a Kill (adventure) =

A View to a Kill is a 1985 role-playing game adventure for James Bond 007 published by Victory Games.

== Plot summary ==
A View to a Kill is an adventure in which the player characters contend with Max Zorin, owner of Zorin Enterprises, as he tries to take over worldwide control of microchip production.

== Reception ==
Steve Crow reviewed A View to a Kill in Space Gamer No. 76. Crow commented that "the only possible reasons I could see to buy A View to a Kill are a) if you want to pick up on all the things you missed or were confused about in the movie and no one gets around to novelizing it (yes, folks, it follow the movie's script that exactly); b) if you want to play out the exact sequence of the move and, as a halfway-competent gamemaster, can't design an adventure based on the movie yourself; or c) you want to have a complete collection of 007 modules and accessories."

Adventurer magazine reviewed A View to a Kill and stated that "If my resume of this globe trotting adventure whets your appetite for further adventure, then A View To A Kill is the name to ask for."

== Reviews ==
- Casus Belli #31 (Feb 1986)
