= Stacey Sutton =

- James Bond character
- Tanya Roberts as Stacey Sutton
- Portrayed by: Tanya Roberts

In-universe information
- Gender: Female
- Affiliation: State of California; Owner of Sutton Oil
- Classification: Bond girl

Stacey Sutton is a fictional character in the 1985 James Bond film A View to a Kill. She is played by Tanya Roberts.

== Biography ==
In the 1985 film A View to a Kill, Stacey Sutton (Tanya Roberts) is the granddaughter of a California oil tycoon. She lives at Dunsmuir House, handed down to her from her paternal side. As heir apparent, Stacey was in line to take over the company her grandfather left her father. However, Sutton Oil was taken over by billionaire Max Zorin (Christopher Walken) when Sutton's father died. Sutton is locked in a lawsuit against Zorin regarding ownership of the oil company. Because of her protracted legal battles with Zorin she has sold much of the house's furnishings. She works as a geologist for the state of California at San Francisco City Hall, under an official named Howe (Daniel Benzali).

Sutton first appears at Max Zorin's mansion near Paris, where he is holding a high prestige horse sale. James Bond (Roger Moore) suspects foul play when he eavesdrops on Zorin writing her a cheque for $5 million. He later approaches her, and Sutton is initially suspicious.

Bond and Sutton meet again when she is about to be attacked by Zorin's henchmen sent to frighten her into accepting his $5 million check. She tears up the check, determined to fight harder rather than accept Zorin's bribe to give up her shares and drop her lawsuit. They team up after Sutton learns from Bond that Zorin is pumping sea water into oil wells. When Sutton tries to bring this to Howe's attention, she is fired and realizes the depth of Zorin's influence.

Zorin and May Day (Grace Jones) capture Sutton and Bond at City Hall and frame them for murdering Howe. They trap Sutton and Bond in an elevator and set the elevator shaft on fire. Sutton and Bond escape the burning building. They steal a fire truck when officers on scene attempt to detain them for Howe's murder.

Bond and Sutton enter Zorin's mine undetected and discover Zorin put sea water into oil wells to submerge the Hayward and San Andreas faults. They realize Zorin plans to detonate both faults where they converge, flooding Silicon Valley in a double earthquake. This would allow Zorin to create his own microchip monopoly in the booming computer industry.

After a detonator and explosives are set far below where the two faults meet, Zorin destroys the upper part of the mine by blasting through an above lake with a smaller set of bombs. He shoots his fleeing workers and leaves the rest, including May Day, to drown. Sutton and Bond are separated when Bond falls with May Day into the rising water. May Day is furious Zorin left her to die and helps Bond move the detonator clear of the mine with a handcar. She willingly gives her life by driving the handcar outside the mine where it detonates in Zorin's sight under his airship.

Sutton climbs out of the mine through an upright shaft and is lifted by Zorin onto the airship. Bond grabs a mooring rope and clings to it as the airship heads for the Golden Gate Bridge. Zorin attempts to kill Bond by flying against bridge, but Bond anchors the ship to the bridge's framework, trapping it. Sutton knocks out henchman Scarpine (Patrick Bauchau), hits his aide Dr. Carl Mortner (Willoughby Gray), and tumbles out of the airship. Bond grabs her hand and she is able to gain footing on the framework under him. Zorin jumps onto the framework with an axe and swings at Bond, but he eventually loses his balance and falls off the bridge to his death. Mortner, a Nazi scientist whose real name is Hans Glaub, attempts to avenge Zorin by throwing lit dynamite at Bond and Sutton, but before he can take aim, Bond cuts the mooring rope with Zorin's axe. The airship, still under power, lurches upward and the sudden motion causes Mortner and the explosives to fall backwards into the cabin. Mortner and Scarpine fumble in a panic but are unable to toss the dynamite and are killed. Sutton and Bond are safe from the explosion.

Stacey and Bond are found personally by MI6 kissing in the shower. Although Bond is believed to have perished in the fight with Zorin, Q (Desmond Llewelyn) finds the two lovers using a remote-controlled robot camera. Bond throws a towel over the robot camera, and Q reports to his superiors that 007 is alive and "cleaning up a few details."

== Reception ==
In 2006 Entertainment Weekly ranked Sutton as the second worst Bond girl. Dose ranks her as the sixth best Bond girl. Years after the film premiered, Roger Moore stated that he thought there was little or no chemistry between their characters.

John L. Flynn and Bob Blackwood comment that Sutton "receives the blond bombshell trophy" and that from the moment they saw her "it was hard to keep our eyes off her". They note, however, that after her heroic stand against Zorin, she seems to spend the remainder of the film wailing, "Help me, James." Similarly, Mark O'Connell describes Sutton as "very much in the Mary Goodnight camp of the simpering, shrieking and not very resourceful Bond girl as set out in The Man with the Golden Gun."

A number of commentators compare Sutton to May Day: Paul Simpson argues that Sutton was "consistently overshadowed by Grace Jones' May Day," while James Chapman suggests that May Day is a "far more memorable character" than Sutton, who "represents a throwback to the worst excesses of 1970s bimboism."
