= May Day (James Bond) =

- James Bond character
- Grace Jones as May Day
- First appearance: A View to a Kill (1985)
- Portrayed by: Grace Jones

In-universe information
- Gender: Female
- Affiliation: Zorin Industries
- Classification: Bond girl / Henchwoman

May Day is a character in the James Bond film A View to a Kill, played by actress Grace Jones. Jones received a Best Supporting Actress nomination at the 1985 Saturn Awards for her performance.

== In the film ==
May Day (Grace Jones) works as both enforcer and lover for Max Zorin (Christopher Walken). During the film she kills Achille Aubergine (Jean Rougerie), Sir Godfrey Tibbett (Patrick Macnee), Chuck Lee (David Yip) and an unnamed Taiwanese business tycoon on Zorin's skyship. She escapes James Bond (Roger Moore) by jumping from the Eiffel Tower with a parachute. She has sex with Bond during the film, dominating him by being on top.

When she fights Bond at the end of the film, however, May Day realizes Zorin has left her to die in his mine saying "...and I thought that creep loved me!" She then choose to side with and helps Bond move a bomb clear of the mine with a handcar. She willingly drives it out of the mine and, while Bond desperately runs after her and urges her to jump to safety, it detonates, killing her.

== Casting ==
Grace Jones was suggested for the role by former Bond girl Barbara Bach, who played Anya Amasova in The Spy Who Loved Me (1977). Film academic Lisa Funnell notes that May Day was "privileged in the film's promotion, standing back-to-back with Bond in movie posters that asked, "Has James Bond finally met his match?""

B. J. Worth was the stunt double in the Eiffel Tower scene.

Film poster for A View to a Kill depicting James Bond and May Day.

== Analysis ==
Commentators have extensively discussed May Day's position as a black woman, especially in regards to her strength. James Chapman argues that May Day is a "highly problematic character within the terms of the Bond series: as a dominant woman (and, moreover, a dominant black woman) she represents a challenge to Bond's masculinity which is never properly resolved." Chapman concludes that "in terms of the sexist code of the Bond films, May Day is simply too problematic to be allowed to live." Kristen Shaw argues that

May Day is represented as a monstrous female: she is unapologetically violent, has superhuman strength, and seduces Bond by jumping on top of him and taking control. Although she switches allegiances at the conclusion of the film, helping Bond and sacrificing her life in the process, she remains coded as animalistic, non-human, and deviant. These black women are reduced to stereotypes; both are hyper-sexualized and represented as duplicitous and violent.

Travis L. Wagner notes that May Day is "presented as being physically strong and sexually alluring." They argue that "May Day can be read as a distinct postcolonial subaltern Other". Wagner goes on to suggest that

As a subaltern, May Day decidedly lacks a voice for most of the film, often resorting to brutish, violent feats of strength to express her thoughts, all the while reinforcing the colonial rhetoric of the Other as a beast. For May Day, physical actions trump verbal expressions, and this is most notable in her sexual encounter with Bond, where she silently disrobes and jumps into bed with him.

Charles Burnetts sees May Day as a "fluffer" character: a member of a group of women in the Bond films whom Bond seduces earlier in the movie but who disappear by the end and serve only to keep the male "agent" aroused until the arrival of the primary sexual object, the Bond girl. Burnetts suggests that May Day

Embodies aspects of both the “animalistic sexuality” of a colonizing white male fantasy... and a hyper-masculinity that threatens to destabilize Bond’s sexual politics. I argue that May Day serves as a high-watermark for the fluffer character, and, true to her name, as a kind of emergency distress signal with respect to the Bond film's racial and gender politics.

A number of commentators compare May Day to Stacey Sutton (Tanya Roberts), who is the main Bond girl in the film: Paul Simpson argues that Sutton is "consistently overshadowed by Grace Jones' May Day," Chapman suggests that May Day is a "far more memorable character" than Sutton," while Lisa Funnell says that May Day outshines the rest of cast. Burnetts argues that May Day represents

An ideal of athleticism, aggression, and strength that dominates not only her childlike employer/lover Max Zorin, but Bond himself throughout the film. May Day also narratively and spatially upstages her conventionally beautiful and white Bond Girl counterpart Stacey Sutton, only to be made scarce and then finally removed like other fluffer characters in the film’s latter half. As if to register her resistance to the fluffer mantle imposed on her by the film's eventual privileging of Sutton, May Day dominates the first half of the film in narrative, sexual, and spatial terms. In at least two sequences, Bond’s surveillance of Sutton is disrupted by the entrance of May Day into his field of vision, motioning for him to turn away and mind his own business. Bond’s classical (white) male gaze, trained voyeuristically again on a "woman as image", is disrupted here by May Day, a woman of color, who turns the gaze upon Bond himself. Such gender instabilities inevitably extend to the bedroom, where Bond is uncharacteristically dominated by her, a submissiveness on his part that the film struggles to contain.

Screen Rant rates May Day as the bravest of all the Bond girls.
