= Jolyon Maugham =

British barrister (born 1971)

Jolyon Maugham KC
- Maugham in 2026
- Born: Jolyon Toby Dennis Maugham; 1 July 1971 (age 55); St Pancras, London, England
- Education: Wellington High School; Durham University (LLB); KU Leuven; Birkbeck College (MA)
- Occupation: Barrister
- Known for: Brexit litigation
- Spouse: Claire Prihartini (m. 2007)
- Father: David Benedictus

Jolyon Toby Dennis Maugham (/mɔːm/; born 1 July 1971) is a British barrister.

Initially a practitioner in taxation law, he later became a founder and director of the Good Law Project, through which he has played a role in bringing a number of legal challenges to the Brexit process. He has written on Brexit and legal issues for publications such as The Daily Telegraph, The Guardian and the New Statesman. He published his first book in 2023.

== Early and personal life ==
Jolyon Maugham is the son of the novelist David Benedictus, although they did not meet until Maugham was 17. He was brought up in New Zealand by his English mother, Lynne Joyce Maugham, and his adoptive father, Alan Barker. At 16, Jolyon left his parents' house after a dispute, and did cleaning work. He went to England in 1989 and stayed with his mother's father after finishing school.

Maugham went to Wellington High School, New Zealand. He graduated with a first-class LLB in European Legal Studies from Durham University (Hatfield College) in 1995. He also spent some time in Belgium at the Katholieke Universiteit Leuven, studying under Walter Van Gerven, and later completed an MA degree at Birkbeck, University of London. As a student he was sent by a temping agency to carry out secretarial work at a law firm, but was sent back for being a man. Maugham sued, claiming to be a victim of sex discrimination, and was awarded compensation.

His father was Jewish, and Maugham considers himself a non-observant Jew, though his wife and wider family are observant.

== Career ==
Maugham completed his pupillage in the chambers of Lord Irvine. Initially practising from chambers in New Square, Lincoln's Inn, Maugham was later a tenant at Devereux Chambers, specialising in taxation law. He was appointed Queen's Counsel in 2015. He left Devereux Chambers at the end of 2020.

In 2023, Maugham published Bringing Down Goliath: How Good Law Can Topple the Powerful, a book that examines three cases and what they can tell us about using the law for social good. It made the Sunday Times bestseller list. The reviewer in the Royal College of General Practitioners' medical journal, the British Journal of General Practice, wrote: "Maugham's blow-by-blow account of the PPE fiasco will make your blood run cold." They refer to Maugham's description of "a despairing senior civil servant who asked for the 'VIP lane' to be abolished as the PPE sourcing team was 'drowning in VIP requests and "High Priority" contacts that ... either do not hold the correct certification or do not pass due diligence' ... [the VIP lane] was crowding out companies who had an actual track record in manufacturing and distributing medical-grade PPE." Summarising the book's importance, the reviewer writes: "Here's why you need to read this book. In these days of complex capitalism, every contract has numerous subcontractors and a murky chain of accountability. In such circumstances, investigative journalists and honest, questioning citizens can get only so far, because powerful people lie." Yuan Yi Zhu gave a critical review in The Times and described the book as "the pompous bloviating of a Twitter KC".

=== Legal challenges to Brexit ===
Maugham brought an unsuccessful case by British expatriates in Europe who objected to their loss of European Union citizenship, a case to clarify whether the Brexit process can be reversed by Parliament, and a failed legal challenge to referendum spending by Vote Leave.

=== Affiliations with political parties ===
Maugham had advised the Labour Party on tax policy under Ed Miliband. In 2018, he was on the advisory council of liberal conservative think tank Bright Blue, which advises the Conservative Party. The Times reported that Maugham "flirted with Labour in the run-up to the 2015 election, harbouring a fleeting fantasy of becoming attorney-general, but decided he wasn't a party political animal".

=== The Good Law Project ===
Maugham is the founder and Executive Director of the Good Law Project (GLP), a not-for-profit campaign organisation that aims to use the law to protect the interests of the public.

During the COVID-19 pandemic in the United Kingdom, the Good Law Project joined with the Runnymede Trust in challenging the appointments of key figures in the British government's pandemic response, such as Kate Bingham and Dido Harding. GLP alleged their appointments were the result of a "culture of cronyism and the highly secretive use of billions of pounds of public funds". In June 2021, the challenge against the appointment of Bingham was dropped. The court ruled that the GLP did not have standing to bring the claims, but for the Runnymede claim ruled that the health secretary, Matt Hancock, failed to comply with his equality duty in making the appointments.

In November 2021, the company Platform 14, which supplied face shields during the COVID-19 pandemic, said it would sue GLP for defamation after GLP alleged the firm had obtained its £120m contract through political connections and had supplied substandard equipment. In a separate case, regarding the award of PPE contracts to healthcare company Abingdon Health, Maugham apologised on behalf of GLP to the Health Secretary and the High Court for publishing a witness statement that had not been entered into evidence in the case, a breach of civil procedure rules.

A 2022 profile in The Times described Maugham as "the Marmite of the Bar", who "rose from relative obscurity to found the Good Law Project".

=== Trans rights ===
Maugham has been an outspoken supporter of transgender rights and in November 2020 was representing a transgender boy in a lawsuit against the NHS over treatment delays.

As of June 2021, Maugham was involved in an appeal by advocacy organisation Mermaids against a decision to award charitable status to the LGB Alliance. The appeal was made on the basis of the notion that LGB Alliance did not meet the threshold tests to be registered as a charity. Maugham has spoken publicly about the charity, which he described as "a transphobic hate group". Mermaids lost the appeal.

=== Other matters ===
In 2019, Maugham said that two High Court judges, Mr Justice Swift and Mr Justice Supperstone, were biased in favour of the government following Mr Justice Swift's refusal of permission to Good Law Project to bring a legal challenge against Brexit. Maugham was criticised by other lawyers on the social network site Twitter for the statement.

In late 2019, Maugham referred to the Talkradio presenter Julia Hartley-Brewer having revealed his home address at a time when he was receiving death threats. Maugham criticised the television programme Question Time for allowing Hartley-Brewer to appear as a panellist. There was considerable criticism of the decision on social networks and a campaign to boycott Question Time in view of its decision to feature Hartley-Brewer following her actions. Hartley-Brewer said Maugham's address was already easily available online and that he had previously revealed it himself in published interviews.

On 26 December 2019 (Boxing Day), Maugham stated in a Twitter post that he had "killed a fox with a baseball bat". Maugham said that the fox was entrapped by the netting surrounding a hen house in his garden. The killing drew widespread condemnation and received extensive coverage, domestically and internationally. The Royal Society for the Prevention of Cruelty to Animals investigated the matter, but decided not to prosecute because a post-mortem showed the fox had been killed swiftly, meaning that "the evidential threshold needed to take a prosecution under the CPS code was not met". In 2021, Maugham said that he and his chambers were blacklisted by law firm Allen & Overy as a result of the incident.
