= CIGA Healthcare =

British manufacturer of diagnostic tests

CIGA Healthcare is a British manufacturer of lateral flow assay diagnostic tests. It is under contract to the British government for the supply of AbC-19 rapid antibody tests, a test for the presence of IgG antibody against the SARS-CoV-2 spike protein, as part of the UK Rapid Test Consortium program.

== Distribution ==
CIGA Healthcare will be responsible for assembly and distribution of the AbC-19 rapid antibody tests, and has also been awarded distribution in the US after recent FDA approval.
