= UK Rapid Test Consortium =

Consortium created to produce a rapid test for COVID-19

The UK Rapid Test Consortium (UK-RTC) was a consortium of businesses and universities that was established in 2020 as part of the response to the COVID-19 pandemic. The consortium's aims included creating new types of COVID-19 tests, that provided advantages over existing tests such as PCR. Lateral flow rapid tests were developed by the consortium, after investment by the government of the United Kingdom. The consortium members included Abingdon Health, BBI Solutions, CIGA Healthcare, Global Access Diagnostics, Omega Diagnostics, and Oxford University.

== Consortium establishment ==
The government's Life Science Advisor, Sir John Bell, recommended that a consortium should be formed to develop the tests, after the government purchased 3.5 million antibody tests from outside of the UK which were subsequently deemed too unreliable. As a result, the consortium was set up in 2020. The government signed a Memorandum of Understanding with the organisations that formed the consortium.

== AbC-19 rapid antibody test development and approval ==
In 2020, the consortium developed the AbC-19 rapid antibody test to meet UK government requirements. These tests were designed to establish if someone had developed antibodies and immunity to the virus. Abingdon Heath led the consortium and was given a £10 million contract by the government on 2 June 2020 for the materials required to produce the tests. In mid July 2020, the news reported that major trials had taken place with promising results, and later that month the lateral flow rapid antibody test developed by the consortium received a CE mark, which approved the test for usage by professionals in the UK and EU. The government awarded a further £75 million contract to Abingdon Health on 14 August 2020. The contract awards were subject to a legal challenge by the Good Law Project, which the government subsequently won.

By the end of August 2020, COVID-19 tests were in short supply and the lateral flow rapid test developed by the consortium was awaiting regulatory approval from the Medicines and Healthcare products Regulatory Agency. Their pre-approval was required to complete usability studies, to evaluate if the tests were suitable to be self-administered; this research was later completed by Ulster University.

== Research, manufacturing and distribution ==
The government ordered 1 million of the UK-RTC's rapid tests in October 2020. CIGA Healthcare was made responsible for assembly and distribution, and was awarded distribution to the United States in November 2020 after approval was given by the FDA. The BMJ published the results of the evaluation of the tests, in the same month, which concluded that one in five testing positive with AbC-19 would be false positives. By December 2020, the consortium was working with regulatory bodies and customers in 27 countries to make the tests more widely available.

A contract was later awarded to Omega Diagnostics and Global Access Diagnostics, in 2021, who had manufacturing capacity to produce 200 million lateral flow tests. Professor Chris Molloy, the Chair of the UK Rapid Test Consortium, said "We have increased manufacturing capacity tenfold, and our member's tests continue to be validated and marketed". The research into the user experiences of people conducting the tests themselves, completed by Ulster University, was published in July 2021 and showed that the user experience score was 96.03%, with the researchers and participants agreeing on the interpretation of the result 95.85% of the time.
