= Floating Down to Camelot =

Novel by David Benedictus

First edition (publ. Macdonald)

Floating Down to Camelot is a campus novel by David Benedictus published in 1985 and set in Cambridge.

The title is drawn from Tennyson's poem The Lady of Shalott, in which while floating down to Camelot the Lady of Shalott apparently dies of a broken heart, caused by the rejection of Sir Lancelot.

Benedictus began to write the novel while he was a fellow commoner at Churchill College, Cambridge, and a Judith E. Wilson visiting Fellow in the University.

== Principal characters ==
- Bill, a Cambridge undergraduate, believes in free will, but suffers from extreme poverty.
- Helen, an impressionable Cambridge student of English literature.
- Lance, an American reading Natural Sciences.
- John, a Cambridge don who teaches determinism but who suffers from randomness in his own life.
- Gillian, John's wife, who sees signs of divine intervention even in the game of Scrabble.
- Olaf, who always wears beige - "wool or tweed or synthetics, but always beige".
- Buzz, also known as 'The Duck'.

== Summary ==
When Bill, an impoverished Cambridge student, is even unable to pay for his mother's funeral, his thoughts turn to crime. However, a friend warns him that "To have no money is to join the aristocracy, Bill. When the day comes for you to have it, you will have left the aristocracy, never to return." Another central character, Helen, an undergraduate reading English literature, lacks stability in her life and finds her main solace in poetry and particularly in the romantic medieval work of Tennyson. Her obsession with The Lady of Shalott, and her identification with the lady of the poem, bring her to a fatal ending. Helen has been seduced by the medieval romances of the Victorian era but does not wish to be seduced by Bill. Lance, a scientist, hopes to save the world, but the effect of his experiments on Helen is less positive. Meanwhile, the Cambridge rapist is at large. "This is the world of bedsitter girls, of Auden and Betjeman and Brian Patten." By buying a Donald Duck mask for bank robbing purposes, Bill unwittingly identifies himself with the rapist.

In the course of a week during the University's Michaelmas term, the tensions and interplay between the leading characters lead not only to bank robbery, but also to ritual castration, transvestism, and a fatal car crash. "From the Whipple Museum to the University Arms Hotel, intellectuals and tourists turned pale. What could have caused it, this catastrophic sound?"

The novel includes many quotations, not only from Tennyson but also from Thomas Hood, William Thackeray, and W. H. Auden.

== Analysis ==
According to one critic, "Floating Down to Camelot is a merciless novel about the loss of landmarks and the state of disorder in the contemporary English society. All the traditional sources of stability... are here ruthlessly debunked."

Another analysis suggests that "the narrator of David Benedictus's Floating Down to Camelot epitomizes the ludic quest... But the emphasis is so ostentatiously on the comic process rather than on the derided target that the ludic seems to eradicate the satiric.

The book is considered of enough significance to be listed in Graham Chainey's A Literary History of Cambridge. Perhaps surprisingly, the American Jewish Year Book for 1987 considered it to be a "new fictional work of Jewish interest".
