= You're a Big Boy Now (novel) =

Novel by David Benedictus

- First edition (UK)
- Author: David Benedictus
- Language: English
- Published: Dutton, 1964; Anthony Blond, 1963
- Pages: 187
- OCLC: 1632483

You're a Big Boy Now is a 1963 satirical novel by the British author David Benedictus. It was adapted into a 1966 film directed by Francis Ford Coppola, with the setting changed from London to New York City.

== Dedication ==
Benedictus dedicated the book to "the only girl I've ever loved—wherever they may be"; in a preface, the author describes the novel as an examination of "the deadliest form of self-destruction, which is love".

== Plot ==
The central character of the novel is Bernard Chanticleer, a shoe salesman at a London department store at which his father is a manager. The Chanticleers live in a suburb, and "are type-cast as ridiculous bourgeois". At the store he meets a girl, Amy, who is rejected by his mother as "that terrible blatant girl with such common legs too".

Bernard, described by one reviewer as "comically neurotic", then becomes infatuated with a stage actress, Barbara Darling. He sends her an impassioned note and they agree to meet. Barbara wants to victimize Bernard in revenge for her being ill-treated by men in the past. Eventually Barbara tires of Bernard and marries a window dresser. They have a child who bears a suspicious resemblance to one of Barbara's former lovers.

== Critical reception ==
Robert Donald Spector of the San Francisco Examiner praised the book as "an outrageously funny satire that launches an all-out nuclear attack on every last inch of British life", with the targets including the "Welfare State" and "upper-middle-class snobbishness", with the "blast area" consisting of sex. The hero, Bernard, was compared by Spector to Holden Caulfield, of J. D. Salinger's 1951 novel The Catcher in the Rye.

Oakland Tribune reviewer Dennis Powers wrote that thanks to the author's "malice and winning way with words", the book is "good fun in spite of its flaws", which he said included its cruel comedy and heavy-handed irony. According to Powers, one ought to "read it as a burlesque of 'An American Tragedy,' as a spoof of Angry British fiction, as a frightening condemnation of love. There is no end to the possibilities."

== Film adaptation ==
The novel was brought to the attention of Francis Ford Coppola by actor Tony Bill, who wanted to play Bernard in any movie adaptation. But Coppola cast instead Peter Kastner, a young Canadian actor. Coppola optioned the film for $1,000, and drafted a script in his spare time while working on the film Is Paris Burning?. Coppola moved the story to New York City, and changed the shoe store to the 42nd Street main branch of the New York Public Library. Elizabeth Hartman was cast as Barbara, Karen Black as Amy, and Rip Torn and Geraldine Page played the parents. The film ended on a more upbeat note than the novel. In the film, Bernard is reunited with Amy, whereas in the novel he winds up alone.
