= Mittersill Castle =

Medieval castle in Salzach, Salzburg, Austria

Coordinates: 47°17′14″N 12°29′04″E

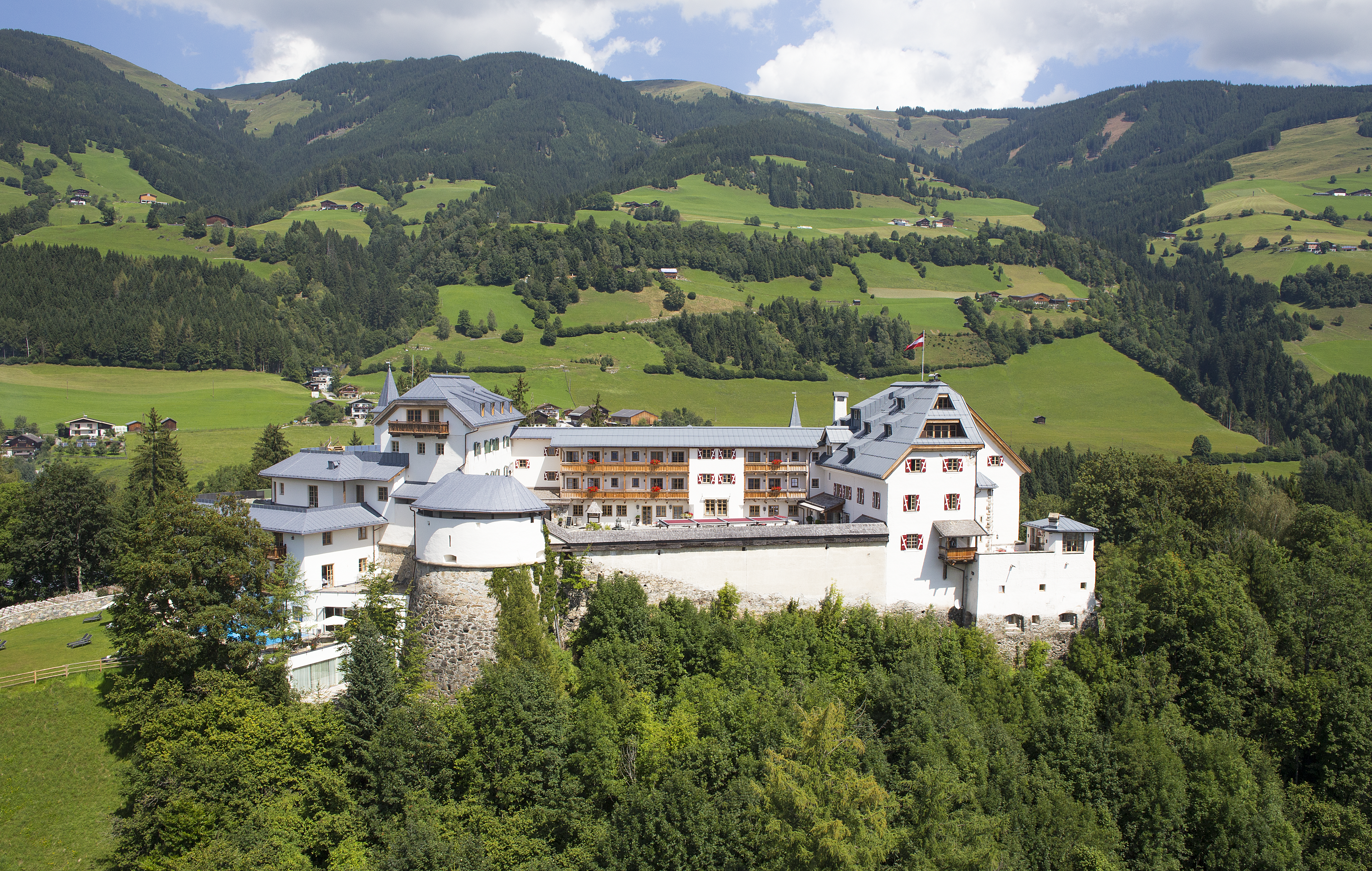
Schloss Mittersill in the Austrian Alps

Mittersill Castle (German Schloss Mittersill) is a medieval castle. It sits on the northern side of the Salzach valley some 140m above the city of Mittersill in the Pinzgau region in the Federal state of Salzburg, Austria.

== History ==
The area surrounding the castle was settled at least 4,000 years ago, but the significance of the castle in trans-alpine traffic became especially important between the 10th to 14th centuries.

The first records known of the castle date to the 12th century while Pinzgau was under the control of the Duchy of Bavaria, when the Counts of Lechsgemünd (subsequently: Mittersill) decided to establish their family seat there. The site had been chosen on the northern side of the Salzach river because of its ideal location in not only being able to control merchant traffic from Pass Thurn but also that exiting from the southern Felber valley. The castle itself was built in a horseshoe-shape, with an opening to the east and a defensive wall to the south.

In 1228 the fiefdom of Pinzgau came under the control of the Archbishopric of Salzburg and the castle was made the seat of the Archbishops in Upper Pinzgau, and was used as a regional court for almost the next 600 years, including witch trials in Pinzgau, that started in the 16th century and continued into the 18th century. In 1816 after the Napoleonic Wars the Regional Court was transformed into a k. u. k. District Court, and despite the abolition of the Archbishopric of Salzburg in 1806, clergy continued to reside in the castle until as late as 1850.

During the German German Peasants' War of 1525-1526 the castle was plundered and burnt to the ground. Rebuilding of the castle started in 1537 at a cost of 2500 Guilder to give it the appearance that it bears today, with later rebuilding work in the 16th century made after further smaller fires in 1555 and 1597. Though the castle was rebuilt to incorporate already existing structural elements, it was enhanced by newer defensive technologies and more modern comforts. So it was that the west side was strengthened through addition of its two characteristic turrets. In the southern one, the so-called “Witches’ Tower”, a castle chapel was created on the upper floor.

In 1880 the castle was auctioned off, for a price of 4000 Guilder to grain merchant Anton Hahn who himself sold the castle two years later to Countess Marie Larisch von Moennich who employed architect Carl Gangolf Kayser in making renovations to the building. Ownership changed several times in the years that followed, the appearance of its interior rooms changing with each passing resident. Mittersill Castle experienced a very glamorous period from 1935-67 under the leadership of Baron Hubert von Pantz. In 1936, the Schloss Mittersill International Sport and Shooting Club was founded. Notable guests during this period include Dutch Queen Juliana and Prince Bernhard, the Shah of Persia, Clark Gable, Henry Ford, Bob Hope and Aristotle Onassis. During this period the castle suffered further fire damage when in 1938 it was struck by lightning.

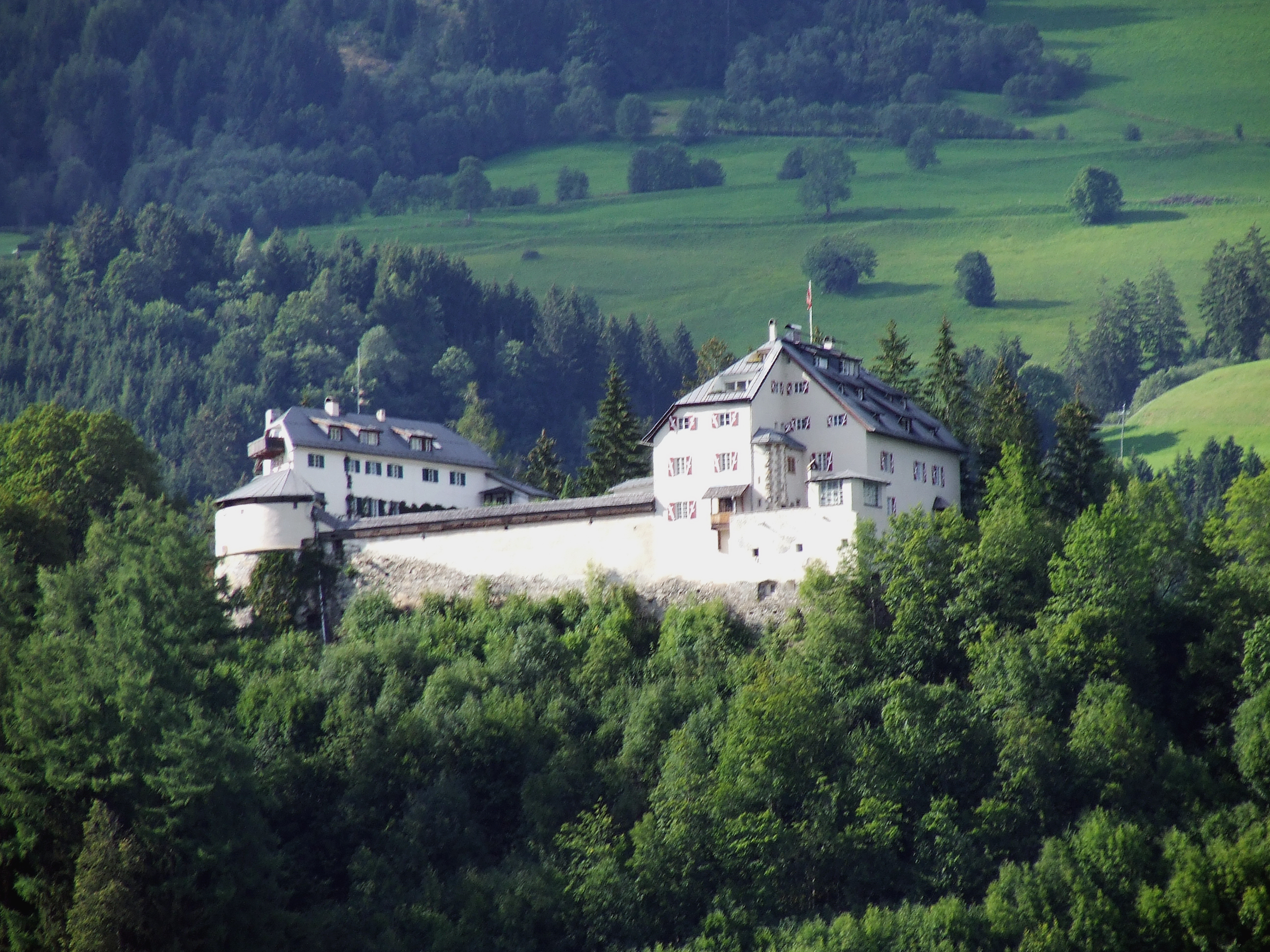
Schloss Mittersill as seen from the town below

During the Nazi period the castle was used as a State Institute think-tank for Inner Asia and as a sub-department of the "Ahnenerbe e.V." (a Nazi German think tank for Intellectual Ancient History). For a short time the castle was used as an outer command base for the Mauthausen Concentration Camp, and at least 15 female prisoners were brought there. The female prisoners are stated to have been Jehovah's Witnesses. At the end of the war, when the owners had the property returned to them, they found thousands of skulls of Asiatic origin, in all the rooms.

=== Ian Fleming ===
In the 1930s the author Ian Fleming would occasionally stay at the sports club of Schloss Mittersill in the Austrian Alps, following its period as an Institute for research into so-called "race science this pseudo-scientific research centre is stated to have inspired Fleming's creation of the character Blofeld's own centre of Piz Gloria in the novel On Her Majesty's Secret Service.

== Today ==
In 1967, Mittersill Castle was purchased by means of several donations, in order to be used as a centre for Christian student conferences by the International Fellowship of Evangelical Students and other Christian groups.

In 2009, the Castle was bought by two local families, who opened a restaurant in 2010 and who later turned it into a hotel, which is also open to the public. First rooms were rented out in summer/winter 2011. The castle has 43 rooms as well as 10 suites.
