= Richard Chopping =

British artist (1917–2008)

Richard Wasey Chopping (14 April 1917 – 17 April 2008) was a British illustrator and author best known for painting the dust jackets of Ian Fleming's James Bond novels starting with From Russia, with Love (1957).

== Early life ==
Chopping was born in Colchester, Essex, and educated at Gresham's School, Holt.

== Illustrator ==
Chopping painted in the trompe-l'œil style, creating a realistic and almost three-dimensional appearance. Among his illustrations are nine covers from 1957 to 1966 for James Bond books by Ian Fleming and the cover of John Gardner's first Bond continuation novel, Licence Renewed (1981).

=== Book covers ===
- Alde Estuary: The Story of a Suffolk River (1952; Norman Adlard & Co)
- The Saturday Book (1955; Hutchinson)
- From Russia, with Love (1957; Jonathan Cape)
- The Tenth Aldeburgh Festival Programme Book (1957)
- Goldfinger (1959; Jonathan Cape)
- For Your Eyes Only (1960; Jonathan Cape)
- Thunderball (1961; Jonathan Cape)
- The Spy Who Loved Me (1962; Jonathan Cape)
- The Fourth of June (1962; Anthony Blond) but only the hardback edition
- On Her Majesty's Secret Service (1963; Jonathan Cape)
- You Only Live Twice (1964; Jonathan Cape)
- The Man with the Golden Gun (1965; Jonathan Cape)
- The Fly (1965; Secker and Warburg)
- Octopussy and The Living Daylights (1966; Jonathan Cape)
- The Ring (1967; Secker and Warburg)
- The Last Dodo (1967; Farrar, Straus and Giroux)
- The Thirty-Second Aldeburgh Festival of Music & the Arts Programme Book (1979)
- Licence Renewed (1981; Jonathan Cape)

== Author ==
During the 1940s, Chopping also established himself as an author and illustrator of natural history and children's books. His early work includes Butterflies in Britain (1943), which was drawn directly on the lithographic plates, A Book of Birds (1944), The Old Woman and the Pedlar (1944), The Tailor and the Mouse (1944), Wild Flowers (1944), Heads, Bodies & Legs with Denis Wirth-Miller (1946), and the collection of short stories Mr Postlethwaite's Reindeer (1945).

Chopping's first novel, The Fly (Secker & Warburg, 1965) was recommended to its publisher by Angus Wilson, where David Farrar found it "a perfectly disgusting concoction". It was edited by Giles Gordon, who later wrote that he was determined to like the novel, hoping that "more, and no doubt better, books would follow. The Fly was indeed disgusting." Gordon found Chopping "most fastidious" and his book "sufficiently sordid to appeal to voyeurs, and if Chopping were to adorn it with one of his famous dust-jackets it could be a succès de scandale; and so it proved." Chopping's second novel, The Ring (1967), was more mundane and much less successful. His short story The Eagle appears in the anthology Lie Ten Nights Awake (1967, ed. Herbert Van Thal).

== Private life ==
Chopping's life partner was the landscape painter Denis Wirth-Miller (born 27 November 1915, died 27 October 2010). The two were the first couple to register a civil partnership in Colchester. They lived in Wivenhoe for over sixty years, and were the founders of an artist community which included Francis Bacon.

== Correspondence with Ian Fleming ==
On 8 April 2010 Swann Galleries auctioned an archive of letters between Chopping, Ian Fleming, and others involved in the production of nine of the 007 covers between 1957 and 1966. The letters touch on details about the jacket art, praise for Chopping's work, payment information, copyright issues and other related topics. The lot sold for $57,600.
