= Rufus Harley =

American jazz musician (1936–2006)

Rufus Harley Jr.
- Born: May 20, 1936; Raleigh, North Carolina, U.S.
- Died: August 1, 2006 (aged 70) Philadelphia, Pennsylvania, U.S.
- Genres: Jazz
- Occupation: Musician
- Instrument: Bagpipes
- Years active: 1960s–2005
- Label: Atlantic

Rufus Harley Jr. (May 20, 1936 – August 1, 2006) was an American jazz musician known primarily as the first jazz musician to adopt the Great Highland bagpipe as his primary instrument.

== Biography ==
Although born near Raleigh, North Carolina, at an early age Harley moved with his mother to a poor neighborhood in North Philadelphia, Pennsylvania. He began playing the C melody saxophone at age 12 and also played trumpet. At the age of 22, he began studying saxophone, flute, oboe, and clarinet with Dennis Sandole (1913–2000), an Italian American jazz guitarist who taught several jazz musicians in Philadelphia including John Coltrane, James Moody, Jim Hall, and Pat Martino.

Harley became inspired to learn the bagpipe after seeing the Black Watch perform in John F. Kennedy's funeral procession in November 1963. Then a maintenance worker for Philadelphia's housing authority, Harley began searching the city for a set of bagpipes. Failing to find one, he traveled to New York City, where he found a set in a pawn shop. He purchased the instrument for US$120, quickly adapting it to the idioms of jazz, blues, and funk. On several occasions, when a neighbor called the police to complain about Harley's practicing in his home, he would quickly put away his bagpipes and feign ignorance, asking the officers, "Do I look like I'm Irish or Scottish to you?" He eventually acquired a better set of bagpipes, which cost him a little over US$1,000.

Harley made his bagpipe performance debut in 1964. From 1965 to 1970 he released four recordings as leader on the Atlantic label (all produced by Joel Dorn, an early supporter), also recording as a sideman with Herbie Mann, Sonny Stitt, and Sonny Rollins in the 1960s and 1970s. He later recorded with Laurie Anderson (appearing on her 1982 album Big Science) and The Roots (on their 1995 album Do You Want More?!!!??!), the latter coming about due to a 1994 appearance on The Arsenio Hall Show. In addition to bagpipes, on these albums he also occasionally played tenor saxophone, flute, or electric soprano saxophone.

Harley often wore Scottish garb, including a kilt, in conjunction with a Viking-style horned helmet. After seeing him perform on television, a Scottish family gave him his tartan, the MacLeod tartan, which he wore for the rest of his life. His bagpipe technique was somewhat unorthodox in that he placed the drones over his right shoulder rather than his left. He favored the key of B-flat minor.

Harley lived for much of his life in the Germantown neighborhood of Northwest Philadelphia, Pennsylvania, and frequently gave presentations in Philadelphia-area public schools. During his frequent overseas performance tours, he carried and distributed miniature replicas of the Liberty Bell, the symbol of his hometown, as well as American flags and copies of the U.S. Constitution. He appeared on a number of television programs, including What's My Line?, To Tell the Truth (March 22, 1965 and again c. 2000), I've Got a Secret (October 17, 1966), and The Arsenio Hall Show. He also had a small role in Francis Ford Coppola's 1966 comedy film You're a Big Boy Now, as well as Eddie and the Cruisers (1983). In addition to his performing career, he worked for the Philadelphia Housing Authority for many years.

Harley's album Brotherly Love, released on CD in 1998, was released at the same time as Charles Powell's book The Jazzish Bagpiper, an anthology of images and conversations with Harley. Powell was the first to compliment Harley on his contributions with Celtic bagpipes to American music. Writing in the sleeve notes for the album, Ralph Stevenson Jr., Harley's executive producer, noted:

Rufus Harley resides in Philadelphia, Pennsylvania. Pennsylvania home of the Liberty Bell. Harley, musical ambassador of the City of Brotherly love, has been received and embraced by tribal leaders, heads of state and many notables from around the world. His message of peace and love is blended in this CD collaboration and led by his dues paid, musical labor of sax and bagpipes.

Harley performed with many notable jazz musicians such as John Coltrane, Dizzy Gillespie and Dexter Gordon.

Harley died of prostate cancer at Albert Einstein Medical Center in Philadelphia on August 1, 2006.

A posthumous retrospective on Rhino Handmade, Courage: The Atlantic Recordings, was released in November 2006 as a 3,000-copy limited edition and contains all the tracks from his four Atlantic LPs, plus an unreleased track of Pete Seeger and Joe Hickerson's composition Where Have All the Flowers Gone? recorded in 1969.

Jesus Loves Me
An audio sample of "Jesus Loves Me" (from Brotherly Love, 1998)

== Discography ==
=== As leader ===
- 1965 Bagpipe Blues (Atlantic)
- 1966 Scotch & Soul (Atlantic)
- 1968 A Tribute to Courage (Atlantic)
- 1970 King/Queens (Atlantic)
- 1972 Re-Creation of the Gods (Ankh) (reissued on Transparency)
- 1988 Rufus Harley with Georges Arvanitas Trio – From Philadelphia to Paris (Carrere)
- 1998 Brotherly Love (Tartan Pride)
- 2005 Sustain (Discograph)
- 2009 Bagpipes of the World (Transparency)

=== Compilations ===
- 2000 The Pied Piper of Jazz (compilation of Atlantic tracks, 1965–70)
- 2006 Courage: The Atlantic Recordings (Rhino Handmade limited edition of 3,000 copies)

=== As sideman ===
With Laurie Anderson

- 1982 Big Science (on "Sweaters")

With Herbie Mann

- 1967 The Wailing Dervishes (on "Flute Bag")

With Sonny Rollins

- 1974 The Cutting Edge (on "Swing Low, Sweet Chariot")

With The Roots:

- 1995 Do You Want More?!!!??! (on "Do You Want More?!")

With Sonny Stitt

- 1966 Deuces Wild (Atlantic) (on "Pipin' The Blues")

== Films ==
- 2008 Pipes of Peace: Rufus Harley (DVD)
- Eddie & The Cruisers 1983
