= On Her Majesty's Secret Service (novel) =

1963 espionage novel by Ian Fleming

- First edition cover, published by Jonathan Cape
- Author: Ian Fleming
- Cover artist: Richard Chopping
- Language: English
- Series: James Bond
- Genre: Spy fiction
- Publisher: Jonathan Cape
- Publication date: 1 April 1963
- Publication place: United Kingdom
- Media type: Print (hardback & paperback)
- Pages: 288
- Preceded by: The Spy Who Loved Me
- Followed by: You Only Live Twice

On Her Majesty's Secret Service is the tenth novel and eleventh book in Ian Fleming's James Bond series. It was first published in the United Kingdom by Jonathan Cape on 1 April 1963. Fleming changed the formula and structure from the previous novel, The Spy Who Loved Me, and made a determined effort to produce a work that adhered to his tried and tested format. The initial and secondary print runs sold out quickly, with over 60,000 copies sold in the first month, double that of the previous book's first month of sales. Fleming wrote the novel at Goldeneye, his holiday home in Jamaica, while Dr. No, the first entry in the James Bond film series by Eon Productions, was being filmed nearby.

On Her Majesty's Secret Service is the second book in what is known as the "Blofeld trilogy", which begins with Thunderball and concludes with You Only Live Twice. This episode centres on Bond's ongoing search to find Ernst Stavro Blofeld after the Thunderball incident. Bond finds Blofeld in Switzerland and attacks the centre where he is based, although Blofeld escapes in the confusion. Bond meets and falls in love with Contessa Teresa "Tracy" di Vicenzo during the story. The pair marry at the end of the novel, but hours after the ceremony, Blofeld and his partner, Irma Bunt, attack the couple and Tracy is killed. Fleming developed Bond's character within the book, showing an emotional side that was not present in the previous stories.

As he had done in previous novels, Fleming used his past experiences and details of people he met during his work to provide details in On Her Majesty's Secret Service. The novel is one of three Bond stories to deal with the disruption of markets and the economy, in this case Blofeld's planned disruption to the food supply by bioterrorism. The theme of food and drink is referred to throughout the novel, with Bond's meals and drinks being described in detail.

On Her Majesty's Secret Service received broadly positive reviews in the British and American press with some reviewers pleased at the return to the more traditional form of Bond storyline. The novel was adapted as a three-part story in Playboy in 1963, serialised in eleven parts in the Daily Express and then developed as a daily cartoon strip in the Daily Express in 1964–1965. In 1969 the novel was adapted as the sixth film in the Eon Productions James Bond film series; this was the only film to star George Lazenby as Bond.

== Plot ==
For more than a year, the Secret Service agent James Bond has been involved in "Operation Bedlam": tracking down the criminal organisation SPECTRE and its leader, Ernst Stavro Blofeld, after they had hijacked two nuclear devices in an attempt to blackmail the Western world. (Note: On Her Majesty's Secret Service continues the story from Thunderball (published in 1961) in which the terrorist organisation SPECTRE tried to hold the UK and US to ransom by threatening them with two nuclear bombs.) Convinced SPECTRE no longer exists, Bond is frustrated by his service's insistence that he continue the search and by his inability to find Blofeld. He mentally composes a letter of resignation for his superior, M.

While driving across northern France to Britain, Bond encounters a beautiful young woman named Contessa Teresa "Tracy" di Vicenzo. He subsequently meets her at a gaming table, where he saves her from dishonour by paying the gambling debt she is unable to cover. The next day Bond follows her and interrupts her attempted suicide, but they are captured by professional henchmen. They are taken to the offices of Marc-Ange Draco, head of the Unione Corse, the biggest European crime syndicate. Tracy is the only child of Draco, who believes the only way to save his daughter from further suicide attempts is for Bond to marry her. To facilitate this, he offers Bond a dowry of £1 million; (Note: £1 million in 1963 equates to approximately £18,265,000 in 2025, according to calculations based on the Consumer Price Index measure of inflation.) Bond refuses the offer but agrees to keep in contact with Tracy after she has medical assistance.

At Bond's request, Draco uses his contacts to establish that Blofeld is somewhere in Switzerland. Bond returns to England to be given another lead: the College of Arms in London has discovered that Blofeld has assumed the title and name of Comte Balthazar de Bleuville and, wanting formal confirmation of the title, has asked the College to declare him a count.

On the pretext that an inherited minor physical abnormality (a lack of earlobes) needs a personal confirmation, Bond impersonates a College of Arms representative, Sir Hilary Bray, to visit Blofeld's lair atop Piz Gloria, a fictional mountain in the Swiss Alps. He finally meets Blofeld, who has lost weight and undergone plastic surgery, partly to remove his earlobes, but also to disguise himself from the police and security services who are tracking him down.

Bond learns that Blofeld has apparently been curing a group of young British and Irish women of their allergies to food and livestock. In truth, Blofeld and his aide, Irma Bunt, have been brainwashing them into carrying biological warfare agents back to Britain and Ireland to destroy the agricultural economy, upon which post–Second World War Britain depends. Believing himself discovered, Bond escapes by ski from Piz Gloria, chased by SPECTRE operatives, some of whom he kills in the process; Blofeld sets off an avalanche, which narrowly misses Bond. Afterward, in a state of total exhaustion, he encounters Tracy. She is in the town at the base of the mountain after being told by her father that Bond may be in the vicinity. Bond is too weak to take on Blofeld's henchmen alone and she helps him escape to the airport. Smitten by the resourceful, headstrong woman, he proposes marriage and she accepts. Bond then returns to England and works on the plan to capture Blofeld and thwart his plot.

Helped by Draco's Unione Corse, Bond mounts an air assault against the clinic and Blofeld. The clinic is destroyed, but Blofeld makes off down a bobsled run and—pursued by Bond—he escapes. Bond flies to Germany where he marries Tracy. The two of them drive off on their honeymoon but, a few hours later, Blofeld and Bunt attack the car and Tracy is killed.

== Background and writing history ==
By January 1962 the author Ian Fleming had published nine books in the preceding nine years: eight novels and a collection of short stories. (Note: The books were Casino Royale (1953), Live and Let Die (1954), Moonraker (1955), Diamonds Are Forever (1956), From Russia, with Love (1957), Dr. No (1958), Goldfinger (1959) Thunderball (1961) and the short story collection For Your Eyes Only (1960).) A tenth book, The Spy Who Loved Me, was being edited and prepared for production; it was released at the end of March 1962. Fleming travelled to his Goldeneye estate in Jamaica in January 1962 to write On Her Majesty's Secret Service. He followed his usual practice, which he later outlined in Books and Bookmen magazine: "I write for about three hours in the morning ... and I do another hour's work between six and seven in the evening. I never correct anything and I never go back to see what I have written ... By following my formula, you write 2,000 words a day." For On Her Majesty's Secret Service he "took as much trouble as ever with the plot", according to his biographer, John Pearson.

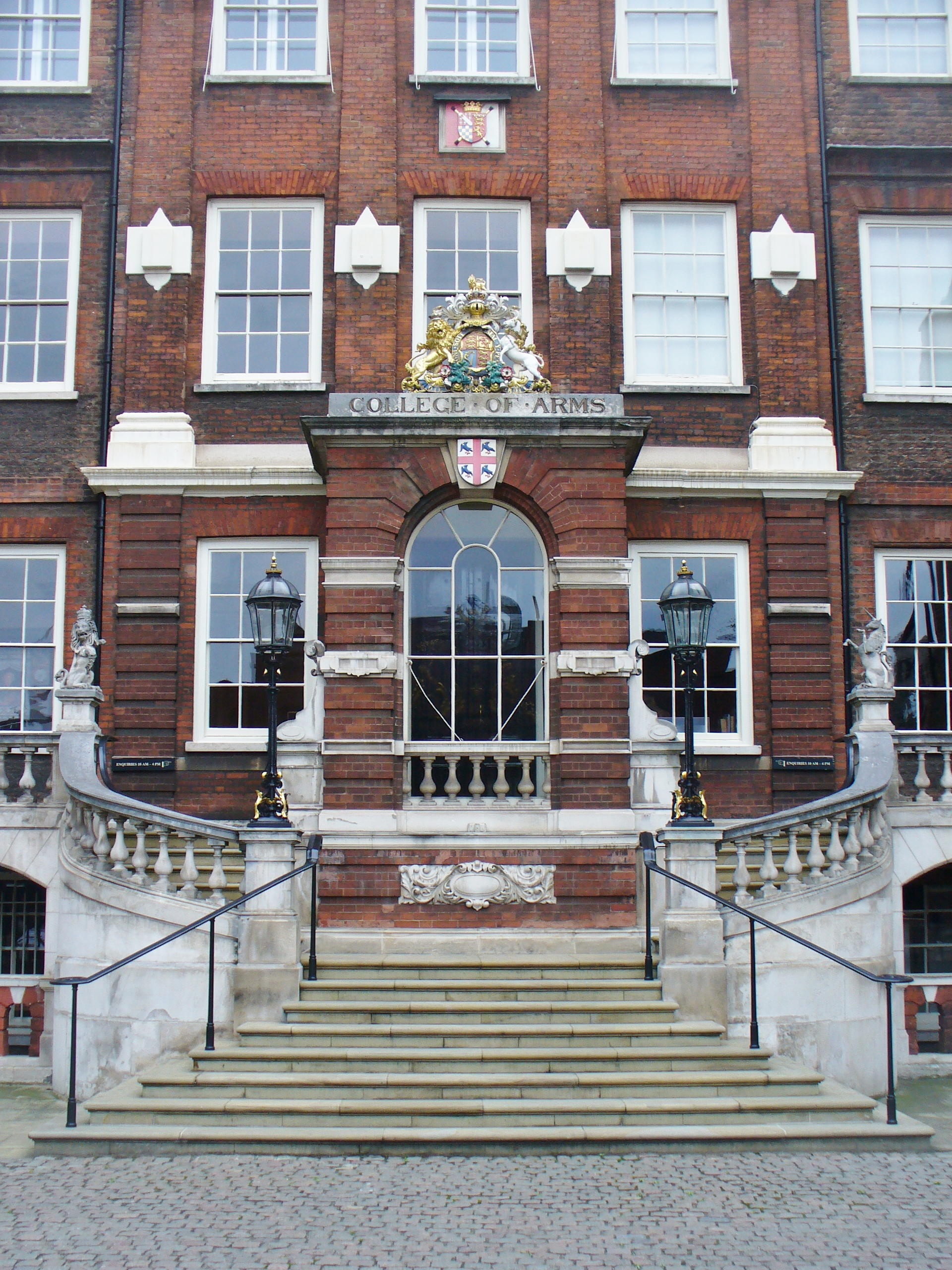
The College of Arms building in London

Fleming experimented with his format in The Spy Who Loved Me, writing the story in the first-person narrative of a Canadian woman whom Bond rescues from rape at the hands of two thugs. He reverted to his usual formula for On Her Majesty's Secret Service. He had undertaken some research in Britain before he left for Jamaica, and he contacted the Writers and Speakers Research Agency to ask about "which parts of the United Kingdom would be the best targets for which bacteria, etc", and to find someone who could speak Corsican and provide information about the Unione Corse. On Her Majesty's Secret Service was written in January and February 1962, while the first Bond film, Dr. No, was being filmed nearby; Fleming visited the film set several times and met the cast, even inviting them to dine at Goldeneye with one of his friends and neighbours, Noël Coward. Fleming was attracted to the film's female lead, Ursula Andress, and included a mention of her in the novel he was writing.

The first draft of the novel was 196 pages long and called The Belles of Hell. Fleming later changed the title after being told of a nineteenth-century sailing novel called On Her Majesty's Secret Service, seen by his friend Nicholas Henderson in Portobello Road Market. Fleming thought his draft was the best book he had yet written. Sections were later added in England after he undertook further research on heraldry and biological warfare. Robin de La Lanne-Mirrlees of the College of Arms assisted Fleming with the background and also designed a coat of arms for Bond.

On Her Majesty's Secret Service is the second book in "the Blofeld trilogy", sitting between Thunderball (1961), where SPECTRE is introduced, and You Only Live Twice (1964), where Bond finally kills Blofeld. Although Blofeld is present in Thunderball, he directs operations from a distance and so he and Bond never meet. On Her Majesty's Secret Service constitutes his and Bond's first meeting. Although Fleming did not date the events within his novels, John Griswold and Henry Chancellor—both of whom wrote books for Ian Fleming Publications—have identified timelines based on episodes and situations within the novel series as a whole. Chancellor put the events of On Her Majesty's Secret Service in 1961; Griswold is more precise and considers the story to have taken place between September 1961 and 1 January 1962.

Although he was often a formulaic writer, with the death of Bond's new wife at the end of the novel Fleming showed he was prepared to break the formula of a popular writer by avoiding a happy ending, according to the writer John Atkins. The communications academic Jerry Palmer believes Fleming was adopting a different convention of a thriller: that the hero should be alone. Palmer states that conventions determined Tracy needed to die, adding "James Bond happily married is a contradiction in terms".

== Development ==
=== Inspirations ===
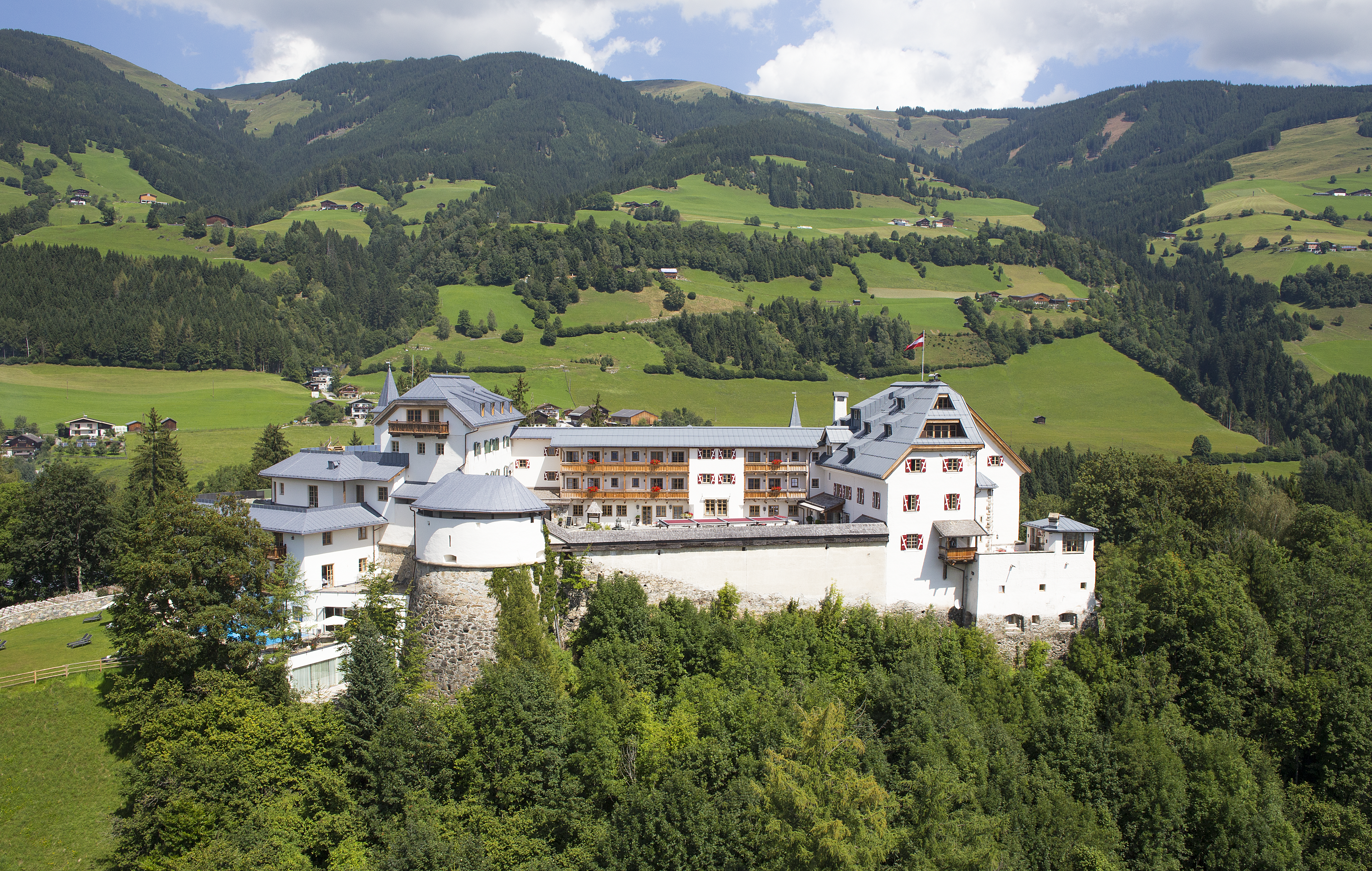
Schloss Mittersill in the Austrian Alps

As with all his Bond books, Fleming used events or names from his life in his writing. In the 1930s Fleming often visited Kitzbühel in Austria to ski; he once deliberately set off down a slope that had been closed because of the danger of an avalanche. The snow cracked behind him and an avalanche came down, catching him at its end: Fleming used the incident as the model for Bond's escape from Piz Gloria. Fleming would occasionally stay at the sports club of Schloss Mittersill in the Austrian Alps; in 1940 the Nazis closed down the club and turned it into an institute for research into so-called "race science". It was this pseudo-scientific research centre that inspired Blofeld's own centre of Piz Gloria. (Note: At the end of the war, when the owners had the property returned to them, they found thousands of skulls of Asiatic origin, in all the rooms.)

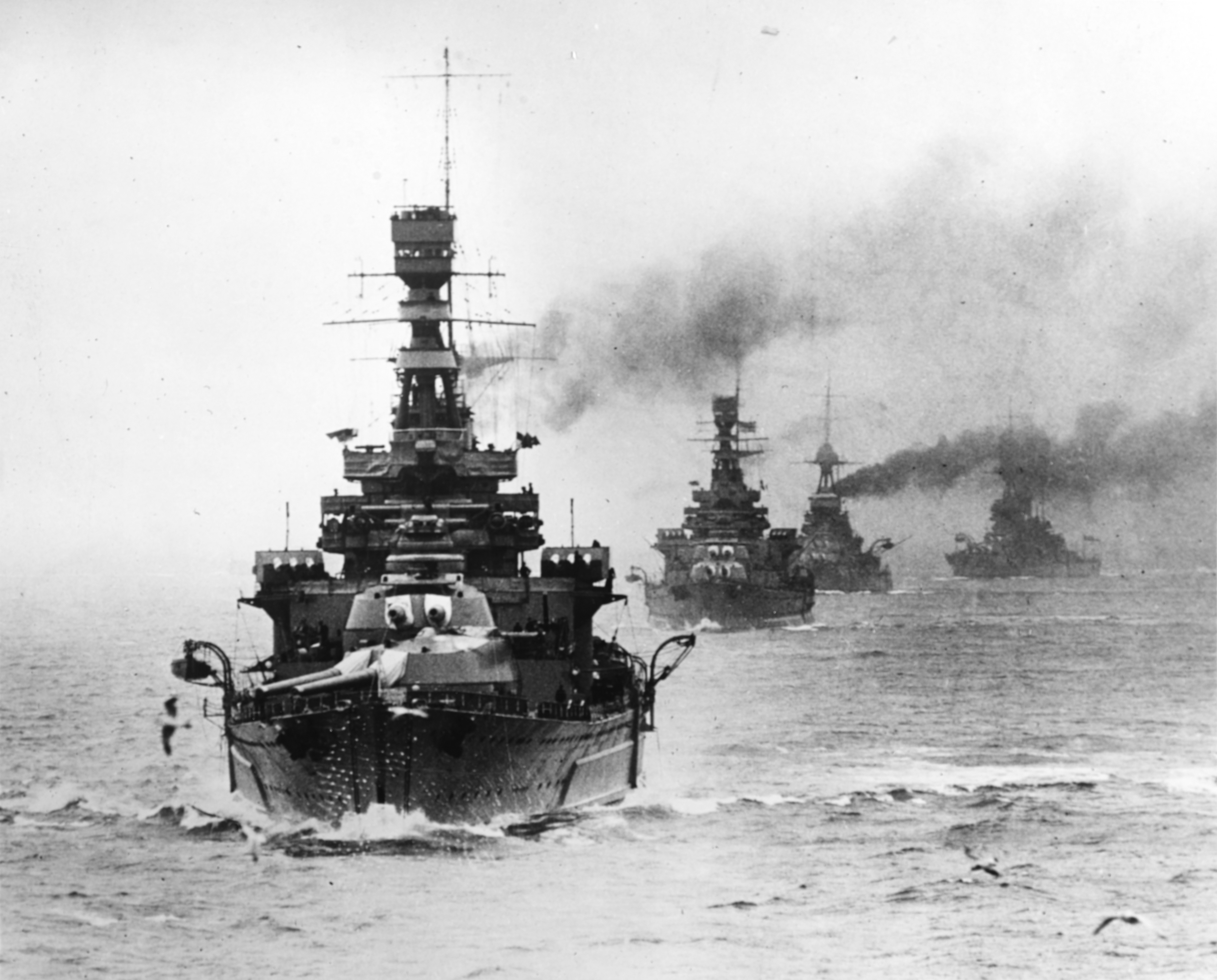
HMS Repulse on manoeuvres in the 1920s

The connection between M and the inspiration for his character, Rear Admiral John Godfrey, was made apparent with Bond visiting Quarterdeck, M's home. There, Bond rings the ship's bell for HMS Repulse, M's last command: it was Godfrey's ship too. Godfrey was Fleming's superior officer in the Naval Intelligence Division (NID) during the war and was known for his bellicose and irascible temperament. Fleming also used the name of Donald McLachlan, a former colleague of both his and Godfrey's in the NID.

The name "Hilary Bray" was that of an old Etonian with whom Fleming worked at the stockbroking firm Rowe & Pitman. "Sable Basilisk" was based on the title of "Rouge Dragon" in the College of Arms. Rouge Dragon was Lanne-Mirrlees's title at the college; he asked Fleming not to use his real title in the book, although it did appear in the manuscript and typescripts. In a play on words, Fleming used Lanne-Mirrlees's address, a flat in Basil Street, and combined it with a dragon-like creature, a basilisk, to come up with the name. Lanne-Mirrlees's ancestors were generally born without earlobes, and Fleming used this physical attribute for Blofeld. During his research, Lanne-Mirrlees also discovered that the line of the Bonds of Peckham bears the family motto "The World is Not Enough", which Fleming appropriated for Bond's own family.

Fleming also used historical references for some of his names. Marc-Ange Draco's name is based upon that of El Draco, the Spanish nickname for Sir Francis Drake. For Tracy's background, Fleming used that of Muriel Wright, a married wartime lover of his who died in an air-raid. Bond's grief for the loss of his wife echoes Fleming's at the loss of Wright. Fleming made some mistakes in the novel, such as Bond ordering a half-bottle of Pol Roger champagne; Fleming's friend Patrick Leigh Fermor pointed out that Pol Roger was the only champagne at the time not to be produced in half-bottles.

=== Characters ===
On Her Majesty's Secret Service contains what the writer Raymond Benson—who later wrote a series of Bond novels—calls "major revelations" about Bond's character and habits. These start with Bond's showing an emotional side, visiting the grave of his former lover Vesper Lynd; it is revealed that he has been doing this every year since her death. (Note: Lynd was Bond's lover and colleague in Casino Royale; she betrayed him to SMERSH—a branch of the KGB—but fell in love with Bond and killed herself at the end of the novel.) This emotional side is again shown with Bond asking Tracy to marry him. The author Val McDermid considers that both professionally and personally, Bond is a more emotionally rounded character than in previous novels in the series. Disillusioned with his job at the start of the novel he progresses through the plot to the point where, for McDermid, "his reactions are complex, far more three-dimensional than the films". In 1963 the critic Raymond Mortimer described Bond as having "values [that] are both anti-humanist and anti-Christian". Bond is the greedy and predatory id to M's "pleasure-hating and grumpy" superego. Mortimer went on to say that "James Bond is what every man would like to be, and what every woman would like between her sheets". The novelist and critic Kingsley Amis—in his examination of Bond—finds Bond a Byronic hero, seen as "lonely, melancholy, of fine natural physique which has become in some way ravaged, of similarly fine but ravaged countenance, dark and brooding in expression, of a cold or cynical veneer, above all enigmatic, in possession of a sinister secret".

Amis observes that Bond's character changes during the course of the novels, physically and emotionally declining through the series; he notes that On Her Majesty's Secret Service sees Bond's sharpest decline because of the death of Tracy, leading him to be in a form of neurosis at the start of the next book, You Only Live Twice. The cultural historians Janet Woollacott and Tony Bennett agree, and note that the darkness in Bond becomes more pronounced with the murder of his wife. Bond drinks far more alcohol in On Her Majesty's Secret Service than he does in previous books, and this reflected Fleming's alcohol intake in the early 1960s. Near the beginning of the novel, one work-day evening, Bond has four double vodkas and tonics and some seconal, a barbiturate; at other points Bond "was aching for a drink" and his urine "showed traces of an excess of uric acid ... due to a super-abundance of alcohol in the blood-stream". One study, undertaken by doctors, estimated Bond's alcohol intake at between 65 and 92 units of alcohol a week, which puts him at the level of "over four times the advisable maximum alcohol consumption for an adult male", based on the UK's medical recommendations. (Note: During the course of On Her Majesty's Secret Service Bond consumes forty-six drinks: Pouilly-Fuissé, Riquewihr and Marsala wines, most of a bottle of Algerian wine, some 1953 Château Mouton Rothschild claret, along with Taittinger and Krug champagnes and Babycham; for whiskies he consumes three bourbon and waters, half a pint of I.W. Harper bourbon, Jack Daniel's whiskey, two double bourbons on the rocks, two whisky and sodas, two neat scotches and one glass of neat whisky; vodka consumption totalled four vodka and tonics and three double vodka martinis; other spirits included two double brandies with ginger ale, a flask of Enzian schnaps and a double gin: he also washes this down with four steins of German beer. Bond's alcohol intake does not seem to affect his performance.)

Benson considers that the character of Tracy is not as well defined as some other female leads in the Bond canon, but points out that it may be the enigmatic quality that Bond falls in love with. Benson also notes that Fleming gives relatively little information about the character, only how Bond reacts to her. The literary critic Dan Mills observes that with two strong female characters in the novel—Tracy and Irma Bunt—On Her Majesty's Secret Service subverts the conventions of the genre by having characters that are equally or more integral to and involved in the plot than their two counterparts, Bond and Blofeld.

Despite Tracy's independent and assertive character, the media historian James Chapman observes that part of her role in the book is to act as "a traditional ... male fantasy of women's sexuality". This he asserts, is "culturally problematic" for readers of the 2010s. In doing do, he says, Tracy is fulfilling the same role as some of the women in the other Bond novels, including Jill Masterton in Goldfinger, Domino Vitali in Thunderball and Viv in The Spy Who Loved Me.

The cultural critic Umberto Eco lists Marc-Ange Draco among those characters in the Bond novels who undertake activities closer to those of the traditional villains, but who act on the side of good in support of Bond; others of this type include Darko Kerim (From Russia, with Love), Tiger Tanaka (You Only Live Twice) and Enrico Colombo (the short story "Risico"). The historian Jeremy Black notes the connection between Draco and the Second World War; Draco wears the King's medal for resistance fighters. The reference to the war is a method used by Fleming in several novels to differentiate good from evil; those who fought for the Allies—particularly Britain—were considered "good", while Germans or those who supported them were "bad". Draco's medal for valour from Britain cements him as one of Bond's core allies, despite his criminal activities.

The sociologist Anthony Synnott observes that many of the men who assist Bond are either handsome or striking looking; this includes Draco, about whom Fleming writes: "The man had such a delightful face, so lit with humour and mischief and magnetism that ... Bond could no more have killed him than he could have killed, well, Tracy". Sable Basilisk is another who fits the same mould, according to Synnott, as Fleming describes him as "rapier-slim, with a fine, thin, studious face that was saved from seriousness by wry lines at the edges of the mouth and an ironical glint in the level eyes" Synnott considers that just as Bond's allies are good looking, his enemies are, on the whole, unattractive and often grotesque. Irma Bunt—described by Mills as "Blofeld's asexual second in command"—is evil and therefore ugly, according to Synnott. When the character first appears in the book, Fleming describes her as looking:

... like a very sunburnt female wardress. She had a square, brutal face with hard yellow eyes. Her smile was an oblong hole without humour or welcome, and there were sunburn blisters at the left corner of her mouth which she licked from time to time with the tip of a pale tongue. Wisps of brownish grey hair, with a tight, neat bun at the back, showed from under a skiing hat with a yellow talc visor that had straps which met under her chin. Her strong, short body was dressed in unbecomingly tight vorlage trousers topped by a grey wind-jacket ornamented over the left breast with a large red G topped by a coronet. Irma La not so Douce, thought Bond.

Blofeld differs from other villains in the Bond series, according to the literary historian Lars Ole Sauerberg. Sauerberg identifies Le Chiffre (Casino Royale) and Mr Big (Live and Let Die) as criminals with large ambitions and Hugo Drax, Doctor No and Goldfinger as those who commit crimes in order to complete their larger plans; all five are connected with the Soviet Union. Blofeld occupies his own classification as the only one of whom it is not possible to distinguish between a criminal act as a means or an end. Sauerberg considers that Blofeld's motives are "in his general nihilism and destructive urge". Synnott notes that not only are nearly all Bond's enemies foreign, they are "doubly foreign". Blofeld's ancestry shows he is Polish and Greek and, during the Second World War, he had betrayed Poland by working with the Abwehr, the Nazi military-intelligence service. (Note: Other "doubly foreign" villains include Dr. No (Dr. No; German-Chinese), Donovan "Red" Grant (From Russia, with Love; German and Irish, fighting for the Soviets), Count Lippe (Thunderball; Portuguese and Chinese).)

== Style ==
Fleming later said of his work, "while thrillers may not be Literature with a capital L, it is possible to write what I can best describe as 'thrillers designed to be read as literature'." He used well-known brand names and everyday details to produce a sense of realism, which Amis called "the Fleming effect". (Note: The "Fleming effect" was a mechanism he continued to use in future books; Rupert Hart-Davis, the publisher and editor who was a close friend of Fleming's brother Peter, later remarked that "when Ian Fleming mentions any particular food, clothing or cigarettes in his books, the makers reward him with presents in kind ... Ian's are the only modern thrillers with built-in commercials.") Amis describes it as "the imaginative use of information, whereby the pervading fantastic nature of Bond's world ... [is] bolted down to some sort of reality, or at least counter-balanced". The literary critic Meir Sternberg observes that Fleming went to great lengths to research the background of various items used in the novels to give readers an impression of the lifestyle or background of the characters. Fleming would occasionally overreach with his descriptions, according to Jerry Palmer, who considers the description in the novel of "Pinaud Elixir, that prince among shampoos" as evidence of this.

Within the text Benson identifies what he described as the "Fleming Sweep", the use of "hooks" at the end of chapters to heighten tension and pull the reader into the next. In On Her Majesty's Secret Service the sweep "moves with confidence and readability" to build the tension. Where the sweep is broken, it is at the visit to the College of Arms and at the meeting at M's house; in both these parts, journalistic background provides necessary detail to enable the plot to proceed. The hooks combine with what the novelist Anthony Burgess calls "a heightened journalistic style"; this, says Fleming, produces "a speed of narrative, which hustles the reader past each danger point of mockery".

The literary analyst LeRoy L. Panek sees On Her Majesty's Secret Service as a fable; he considers Fleming also saw this, and subverted some aspects of the convention within the novel, such as when Bond thinks that "It would be amusing to reverse the old fable—first to rescue the girl, then to slay the monster". Panek sees aspects of fables in many of the Bond novels, often associated with the villains—Fleming describes Le Chiffre as an ogre, Mr Big as a giant, Drax (Moonraker) and Rosa Klebb (From Russia, with Love) as a dragon and a toad, respectively—and notes that "Fleming puts damsels in distress in all the books".

== Themes ==
On Her Majesty's Secret Service is one of three Bond novels to deal with the disruption of markets and the economy. (Note: Goldfinger focuses on gold and The Man with the Golden Gun with sugar price fixing in the Caribbean.) On Her Majesty's Secret Service deals with the food supply or, as the literary analyst Sue Matheson considers it, "the Cold War as a food chain". Wartime rationing had only finished nine years before the novel was published, and many readers still remembered the scarcity of food; Hugh Gaitskell, the Leader of the Labour Party, told Fleming in 1958 "The combination of sex, violence, alcohol and—at intervals—good food and nice clothes is, to one who leads such a circumscribed life as I do, irresistible." The novel is "one of the more food-oriented Bond books", according to the literary analyst Elizabeth Hale. Within the fifty-two days covered in the novel, eight meals are described, Bond's drinks are enumerated and his thoughts on modern cooking and the standard in French restaurants are outlined. Writing in 2006, Val McDermid thought the threat in the novel had even more resonance for contemporary British readers than it would have done at the time of publishing, with public awareness of the BSE outbreak in the 1980s and 1990s and the foot-and-mouth outbreak in 2001. With the plot to render the UK agriculturally infertile, Mills considers On Her Majesty's Secret Service to have the most terrorist-centred plot in the series.

Benson states that gambling is a key theme of the novel, as it is in Casino Royale and Goldfinger. The gambling scene at the beginning of the novel leads to Bond entering a relationship with Tracy; Bond's pretence of being Sir Hilary Bray to enter Piz Gloria to investigate Blofeld is also a form of gamble, according to Benson. Jeremy Black sees an unformulaic structure to the novel with the romance aspect both opening and closing the novel, which was not something Fleming did elsewhere in the series. Hale analyses the novel from the point of view of individualism: the plot starts with Bond alone, voluntarily, prior to meeting Tracy; it ends with him alone, involuntarily, after her murder. For most of the novel, Bond is a solo agent, cut off from the support of his service and reliant only on his abilities; this is in contrast to Blofeld who has a large organisation to support and protect him but still ends up on the losing side. For Black, the individualist tendency is also present in Bond's allies, particularly Draco, who is prepared to help Bond attack Piz Gloria in part because of their shared rejection of authority. Lars Ole Sauerberg sees the assistance Draco gives Bond as a manner of distinguishing SPECTRE from other criminal organisations in what he calls "the struggle of order against chaos"; while Draco and the Unione Corse are conventional criminals, SPECTRE pursues—and represents—what Sauerberg calls "absolute criminal anarchy".

== Publication and reception ==
=== Publication history ===
On Her Majesty's Secret Service was published on 1 April 1963 in the UK as a hardcover edition by Jonathan Cape; it was 288 pages long. A limited edition of 285 copies was also printed; 250 were for sale, having been numbered and signed by Fleming, and the remainder were signed and marked "For Presentation". The artist Richard Chopping undertook the cover illustration for the first edition, as he had done for all the previous Bond books. There were 42,000 advance orders for the hardback first edition and Cape did an immediate second impression of 15,000 copies, selling over 60,000 by the end of April 1963. By the end of 1963 it had sold in excess of 75,000 copies.

The novel was published in America in August 1963 by the New American Library, after Fleming changed publishers from Viking Press following The Spy Who Loved Me; On Her Majesty's Secret Service was 299 pages long. It was the first of Fleming's novels listed in The New York Times Best Seller list, and topped it for over six months.

In September 1964—after Fleming's death in May that year—Pan Books published a paperback version of On Her Majesty's Secret Service in the UK that sold 125,000 copies before the end of the year and 1.8 million in 1965. Since its initial publication the book has been re-issued in hardback and paperback editions, translated into several languages and, as at, has never been out of print. In 2023 Ian Fleming Publications—the company that administers all Fleming's literary works—had the Bond series edited as part of a sensitivity review to remove or reword some racial or ethnic descriptors. Although many of Fleming's racial epithets were removed from the novel, the reference to "homosexual tendencies" being one of the "stubborn disabilities" treatable by hypnosis was retained in the new release. The release of the bowdlerised series was for the 70th anniversary of Casino Royale, the first Bond novel.

=== Critical reception ===
In The Observer, Maurice Richardson pondered if there had been "a deliberate moral reformation" of Bond, although he noted Bond still had his harder side when needed. Marghanita Laski, writing in The Times Literary Supplement, thought that "the new James Bond we've been meeting of late [is] somehow gentler, more sentimental, less dirty". Writing for The Washington Post, Jerry Doolittle thought that Bond is "still irresistible to women, still handsome in a menacing way, still charming. He has nerves of steel and thews of whipcord", even if "he's starting to look a little older".

The critic for The Times considered that after The Spy Who Loved Me, "On Her Majesty's Secret Service constitutes a substantial, if not quite a complete, recovery". In the view of the reviewer, it was enough of a recovery for them to point out that "it is time, perhaps, to forget the much exaggerated things which have been said about sex, sadism and snobbery, and return to the simple, indisputable fact that Mr. Fleming is a most compelling story-teller". Writing in The Guardian, the critic Anthony Berkeley Cox, under the name Francis Iles, considered that On Her Majesty's Secret Service was "not only up to Mr. Fleming's usual level, but perhaps even a bit above it". Richardson also thought that "in reforming Bond Mr. Fleming has reformed his own story-telling which had been getting very loose". Overall he thought that "O.H.M.S.S. is certainly the best Bond for several books. It is better plotted and retains its insane grip until the end". Mortimer, in The Sunday Times, thought the novel Fleming's best; despite innovations for the Bond formula, Mortimer noted that overall, "the pattern here ... is traditional". (Note: The innovations highlighted by Mortimer include that the villain does not capture Bond; no torture is described; and that Bond marries.) The New York Herald Tribune thought On Her Majesty's Secret Service to be "solid Fleming", and the Houston Chronicle considered the novel to be "Fleming at his urbanely murderous best, a notable chapter in the saga of James Bond". Gene Brackley, writing in The Boston Globe about the fantastic nature of the plots, suggested that "Fleming's accounts of the half-world of the Secret Service have the ring of authenticity" because of his previous role with the Naval Intelligence Division. Doolittle considered that "Fleming's new book will not disappoint his millions of fans". The critic for Time magazine referred to previous criticism of Fleming and thought that "in Fleming's latest Bond bombshell, there are disquieting signs that he took the critics to heart" when they complained about "the consumer snobbery of his caddish hero". The critic mourned that even worse was to follow, when "Bond is threatened with what, for an international cad, would clearly be a fate worse than death: matrimony".

Writing in The New York Times, Anthony Boucher—later described by John Pearson as "throughout an avid anti-Bond and an anti-Fleming man"—was again critical, although he wrote that "you can't argue with success". He went on to say that "simply pro forma, I must set down my opinion that this is a silly and tedious novel". Boucher went on to bemoan that although On Her Majesty's Secret Service was better than The Spy Who Loved Me, "it is still a lazy and inadequate story", going on to say that "my complaint is not that the adventures of James Bond are bad literature ... but that they aren't good bad literature". Laski considered, however, that "it really is time to stop treating Ian Fleming as a Significant Portent, and to accept him as a good, if rather vulgar thriller-writer, well suited to his times and to us his readers".

Robert Kirsch, writing in the Los Angeles Times, considered Fleming's work to be a significant point in fiction, saying that the Bond novels "are harbingers of a change in emphasis in fiction which is important". The importance, Kirsch claimed, sprung from "a revolution in taste, a return to qualities in fiction which [are] all but submerged in the 20th-century vogue of realism and naturalism" and the importance was such that they were "comparable ... only to the phenomenon of Conan Doyle's Sherlock Holmes stories". Kirsch also believed that "with Fleming, ... we do not merely accept the willing suspension of disbelief, we yearn for it, we hunger for it".

== Adaptations ==
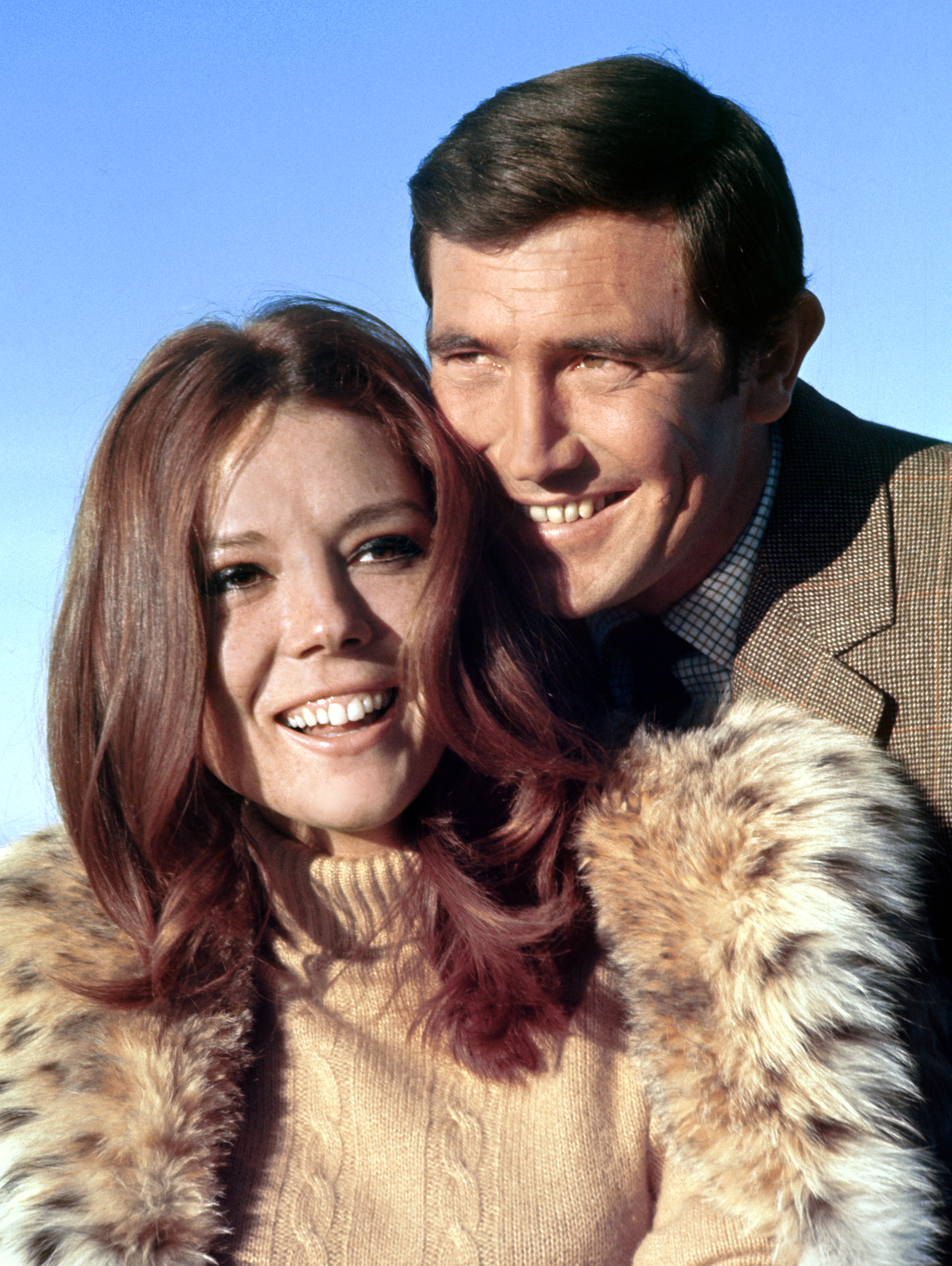
George Lazenby, the second actor to play Bond on the cinema screen, with Diana Rigg, his co-star from On Her Majesty's Secret Service

Following the success of the publication of the short story "The Hildebrand Rarity" in Playboy in March 1960, Fleming chose to serialise On Her Majesty's Secret Service in the magazine in the April, May and June 1963 issues. The novel was also serialised in the Daily Express between 18 and 29 March 1963, and adapted as a daily comic strip for the Daily Express and syndicated worldwide; the strip ran for nearly a year, from 29 June 1964 to 17 May 1965. The adaptation was written by Henry Gammidge and illustrated by John McLusky. The strip was reprinted by Titan Books in On Her Majesty's Secret Service, published in 2004, and again in The James Bond Omnibus Vol. 2, published in 2011.

In 1969 On Her Majesty's Secret Service was adapted into the sixth film in the James Bond film series by Eon Productions. It starred George Lazenby in his only appearance in the Bond role, with Diana Rigg as Tracy. With the films being produced in a different order to the books, the continuity of storylines was broken and the films altered accordingly. Even so, Bond had met Blofeld in the previous film, You Only Live Twice: this previous meeting was ignored for the plot of On Her Majesty's Secret Service. Only minor changes to the novel's plot were made.

In 2014 the novel was adapted for BBC Radio 4's Saturday Drama strand. Toby Stephens, who played Gustav Graves in Die Another Day, portrayed Bond. Joanna Lumley appeared in both the film and radio adaptations of the novel.

== See also ==
- Outline of James Bond

== Notes and references ==
=== Sources ===
==== Books ====
- Amis, Kingsley (1966). The James Bond Dossier. London: Pan Books. OCLC 154139618.
- Atkins, John (1984). The British Spy Novel: Styles in Treachery. London: Calder. ISBN 978-0-7145-3997-3.
- Barnes, Alan; Hearn, Marcus (2001). Kiss Kiss Bang! Bang!: The Unofficial James Bond Film Companion. London: Batsford Books. ISBN 978-0-7134-8645-2.
- Bennett, Tony; Woollacott, Janet (1987). Bond and Beyond: The Political Career of a Popular Hero. London: Routledge. ISBN 978-0-4160-1361-0.
- Bennett, Tony; Woollacott, Janet (2009). "The Moments of Bond". In Lindner, Christoph (ed.). The James Bond Phenomenon: A Critical Reader. Manchester: Manchester University Press. ISBN 978-0-7190-6541-5.
- Benson, Raymond (1988). The James Bond Bedside Companion. London: Boxtree Ltd. ISBN 978-1-85283-233-9.
- Black, Jeremy (2005). The Politics of James Bond: From Fleming's Novel to the Big Screen. Lincoln, Nebraska: University of Nebraska Press. ISBN 978-0-8032-6240-9.
- Burgess, Anthony (1984). 99 Novels. The Best in English Since 1939: A Personal Choice. London: Summit Books. ISBN 978-0-671-52407-4.
- Butler, William Vivian (1973). The Durable Desperadoes. London: Macmillan. ISBN 978-0-333-14217-2.
- Chancellor, Henry (2005). James Bond: The Man and His World. London: John Murray. ISBN 978-0-7195-6815-2.
- Chapman, James (2015). "'Women Were for Recreation': The Gender Politics of Ian Fleming's James Bond". In Funnell, Lisa (ed.). For His Eyes Only: The Women of James Bond. London New York: Wallflower Press. pp. 7–18. ISBN 978-0-2311-7615-6.
- Eco, Umberto (2009). "The Narrative Structure of Ian Fleming". In Lindner, Christoph (ed.). The James Bond Phenomenon: A Critical Reader. Manchester: Manchester University Press. ISBN 978-0-7190-6541-5.
- Fleming, Fergus (2015). The Man with the Golden Typewriter: Ian Fleming's James Bond Letters. New York: Bloomsbury. ISBN 978-1-6328-6489-5.
- Fleming, Ian (1961). Thunderball. Garden City, New York: International Collectors Library. OCLC 12043724.
- Fleming, Ian (1963). On Her Majesty's Secret Service. New York: New American Library. OCLC 297421.
- Fleming, Ian; Gammidge, Henry; McLusky, John (1988). Octopussy. London: Titan Books. ISBN 1-85286-040-5.
- Fleming, Ian (2009). "Ian Fleming on Writing Thrillers". Devil May Care. By Faulks, Sebastian. London: Penguin Books. pp. 314–321. ISBN 978-0-14-103545-1.
- Gilbert, Jon (2012). Ian Fleming: The Bibliography. London: Queen Anne Press. ISBN 978-0-9558-1897-4.
- Griswold, John (2006). Ian Fleming's James Bond: Annotations and Chronologies for Ian Fleming's Bond Stories. Bloomington, Indiana: AuthorHouse. ISBN 978-1-4259-3100-1.
- Hines, Claire (2018). The Playboy and James Bond: 007, Ian Fleming and Playboy Magazine. Manchester: Manchester University Press. ISBN 978-0-7190-8226-9.
- Lindner, Christoph (2009). The James Bond Phenomenon: A Critical Reader. Manchester: Manchester University Press. ISBN 978-0-7190-6541-5.
- Lycett, Andrew (1996). Ian Fleming. London: Phoenix. ISBN 978-1-85799-783-5.
- Lyttelton, George; Hart-Davis, Rupert (1979). Lyttelton–Hart-Davis Letters. Vol. 2. London: John Murray. ISBN 978-0-7195-3673-1.
- Macintyre, Ben (2008). For Your Eyes Only. London: Bloomsbury Publishing. ISBN 978-0-7475-9527-4.
- McDermid, Val (2006). Introduction. On Her Majesty's Secret Service. By Fleming, Ian. London: Penguin. ISBN 978-0-1410-2835-4.
- McLusky, John; Gammidge, Henry; Lawrence, Jim; Fleming, Ian; Horak, Yaroslav (2011). The James Bond Omnibus Vol. 2. London: Titan Books. ISBN 978-1-84856-432-9.
- Mills, Dan (2015). "'What Really Went on up There James?' Bond's Wife, Blofeld's Patients and Empowered Bond Women". In Funnell, Lisa (ed.). For His Eyes Only: The Women of James Bond. London New York: Wallflower Press. pp. 110–118. ISBN 978-0-2311-7615-6.
- Palmer, Jerry (1979). Thrillers: Genesis and Structure of a Popular Genre. New York: St. Martin's Press. ISBN 978-0-3128-0347-6.
- Panek, LeRoy (1981). The Special Branch: The British Spy Novel, 1890–1980. Bowling Green, Ohio: Bowling Green University Popular Press. ISBN 978-0-87972-178-7.
- Parker, Matthew (2014). Goldeneye. London: Hutchinson. ISBN 978-0-09-195410-9.
- Pearson, John (1967). The Life of Ian Fleming: Creator of James Bond. London: Pan Books. OCLC 669702874.
- Sauerberg, Lars Ole (1984). Secret Agents in Fiction: Ian Fleming, John le Carré and Len Deighton. New York: St. Martin's Press. ISBN 978-0-3127-0846-7.
- Smith, Jim; Lavington, Stephen (2002). Bond Films. London: Virgin Books. ISBN 978-0-7535-0709-4.

==== Journals and magazines ====
- Biddulph, Edward (June 2009). "'Bond Was Not a Gourmet': An Archaeology of James Bond's Diet". Food, Culture & Society. 12 (2): 131–149. doi:10.2752/155280109X368688.
- Hale, Elizabeth (2012). "James Bond and the Art of Eating Eggs". Gastronomica. 12 (4): 84–90. doi:10.1525/gfc.2012.12.4.84.
- Johnson, Graham; Guha, Indra Neil; Davies, Patrick (12 December 2013). "Were James Bond's Drinks Shaken Because of Alcohol Induced Tremor?". British Medical Journal. 347 f7255. doi:10.1136/bmj.f7255. PMC 3898163. PMID 24336307.
- Matheson, Sue (2004). "Primitive Masculinity / "Sophisticated" Stomach: Gender, Appetite, and Power in the Novels of Ian Fleming". CEA Critic. 67 (1): 15–24. JSTOR 44377581.
- Sternberg, Meir (1983). "Knight Meets Dragon in the James Bond Saga: Realism and Reality-Models". Style. 17 (2): 142–180. JSTOR 42945465.
- Synnott, Anthony (1990). "The Beauty Mystique: Ethics and Aesthetics in the Bond Genre". International Journal of Politics, Culture, and Society. 3 (3): 407–426. doi:10.1007/BF01384969. JSTOR 20006960.

==== News ====
- "Books: Fate Worse than Death". Time. 30 August 1963. Archived from the original on 22 December 2008.
- Boucher, Anthony (25 August 1963). "On Assignment with James Bond". The New York Times. p. BR4.
- Brackley, Gene (22 August 1963). "Cmdr. James Bond Finds the Going Tough". The Boston Globe. p. 19.
- Doolittle, Jerry (25 August 1963). "007 Seems a Bit Longer in Tooth". The Washington Post. p. G7.
- Iles, Francis (3 May 1963). "Criminal Records". The Guardian. p. 8.
- Kirsch, Robert (25 August 1963). "James Bond Appeal? It's Elementary, Watson". Los Angeles Times. p. E14.
- Laski, Marghanita (5 April 1963). "Strictly for Thrills". The Times Literary Supplement. p. 229.
- Mortimer, Raymond (30 March 1963). "Two Heroes of our Time: James Bond and the Admass Daydream". The Sunday Times. p. 28.
- Mouriquand, David (1 March 2023). "Shaken and Stirred: Why Are the James Bond Books Being Re-edited?". Euronews. Archived from the original on 8 September 2023.
- "New Fiction". The Times. 4 April 1963. p. 16.
- Richardson, Maurice (31 March 1963). "The Reformation of Fleming and Bond: On Her Majesty's Secret Service". The Observer. p. 25.
- Simpson, Craig (25 February 2023). "James Bond Books Edited to Remove Racist References". The Sunday Telegraph.
- Vinciguerra, Thomas (27 December 2019). "50 Years Later, This Bond Film Should Finally Get Its Due". The New York Times.

==== Websites ====
- "BBC Radio 4 – Saturday Drama". BBC.
- Clark, Gregory (2023). "The Annual RPI and Average Earnings for Britain, 1209 to Present (New Series)". MeasuringWorth. Archived from the original on 1 April 2023.
- "On Her Majesty's Secret Service". WorldCat.
- "Ian Fleming's James Bond Titles". Ian Fleming Publications. Archived from the original on 10 August 2015.
- Sutton, Mike (2014). "On Her Majesty's Secret Service (1969)". BFI Screenonline. British Film Institute. Archived from the original on 2 August 2016.
