= Bagpipe Blues =

Studio album by Rufus Harley
- Released: 1965
- Recorded: 1965; New York City
- Genre: Jazz
- Label: Atlantic; SD 3001
- Producer: Joel Dorn

Rufus Harley chronology
Bagpipe Blues (1965)	Scotch & Soul (1966)

Bagpipe Blues is the first album by the piper and saxophonist Rufus Harley, recorded in 1965 and released on the Atlantic label.

== Reception ==
Professional ratings
Review scores
Source	Rating
Allmusic	4/5 stars

Allmusic awarded the album 4 stars.

== Track listing ==
1. "Bagpipe Blues" (Rufus Harley) - 2:41
2. "Kerry Dancers" (traditional) - 5:34
3. "Who Can I Turn To (When Nobody Needs Me)" (Leslie Bricusse, Anthony Newley) - 3:58
4. "More" (Riz Ortolani, Nino Oliviero, Norman Newell) - 6:39
5. "Chim Chim Cher-ee" (Robert B. Sherman, Richard M. Sherman) - 2:26
6. "Sportin'" (Rufus Harley) - 5:04
7. "Sometimes I Feel Like a Motherless Child" (traditional) - 5:34

== Personnel ==
- Rufus Harley - bagpipes, flute, soprano saxophone, tenor saxophone
- Oliver Collins - piano
- James Glenn - double bass
- Billy Abner - drums
