= Abingdon Health =

UK & US manufacturer of diagnostic tests

- Founded: 1 January 2008; 18 years ago
- Headquarters: York, England
- Products: Lateral flow assay

Abingdon Health is a leading international developer, manufacturer and distributor of lateral flow assay diagnostic tests, sometimes called rapid tests, lateral flow immunoassays (LFIA), lateral flow tests (LFT) or quick tests. Since its formation in 2008, Abingdon Health has developed and manufactured lateral flow rapid tests across multiple industries. Headquartered in York, with sites in Doncaster and Madison, USA.

== History ==
2008: Founded by Dr Chris Hand and Chris Yates.

2012: Acquisition of major stake in Forsite Diagnostics Ltd (Forsite); a spin-out from the UK government's Food and Environment Research Agency (now known as Animal and Plant Health Agency).

2015: Dr Chris Hand and Chris Yates are appointed chairman and Chief Executive respectively.

2017: Abingdon takes full ownership of Forsite Diagnostics, and relocates the Group's headquarters to Forsite's York facility.

2019: Growth capital investment by the Northern Powerhouse Investment Fund managed by Mercia Asset Management.

2020: Acquisition of the Doncaster manufacturing facility from Concepta PLC.

2020: IPO of Abingdon Health on the AIM market of the London Stock Exchange.

2020–2022: Abingdon's COVID-19 pandemic response is explained in more detail in the ‘Response to COVID-19 pandemic’ section below.

2022: Launch of Abingdon Simply Test range of self-tests.

2023: Launch of SaliStick, the world's first saliva-based pregnancy test, as the exclusive UK distributor in partnership with Salignostics.

2024: Acquisition of regulatory and quality assurance businesses into the Abingdon Health Group: CS LifeSciences and IVDeology.

2025: Launch of a full-service commercial office and laboratory in Madison, Wisconsin, USA.

== Lateral flow tests made by Abingdon Health ==
Abingdon Health develop, manufactures and distributes rapid diagnostic tests (lateral flow devices) on behalf of its contract customers and has produced and commercialised its own products. Abingdon Health has developed and manufactured sandwich (Non-Competitive) and Inhibition (Competitive) lateral flow immunoassays in areas such as COVID-19, Sexual Health, Fertility, Animal Health, Plant Health, to name a few. Abingdon Health works with numerous clients in the development and manufacture of LFTs. Examples include collaborations with Bioporto, Vatic Health and DeepVerge. A collaboration was also announced in May 2022 with a European client for the manufacture of antigen test components.

In 2015 Abingdon Health launched Seralite a rapid diagnostic device for the quantitative measurement of kappa (K) and lambda (λ) immunoglobulin free light chains (FLCs) in serum. The company also produces PCRD and PCRD FLEX: lateral flow tests designed to detect nucleic acid following isothermal amplification with technologies such as Loop-mediated isothermal amplification (LAMP) or Recombinase polymerase amplification (RPA), for example. In addition the Abingdon Health owns and manufactures the Pocket Diagnostic brand. A range of tests designed to detect important and commercially damaging plant pathogens such as Phytophthora and Potato virus Y.

== Response to COVID-19 pandemic ==
At the start of the COVID-19 pandemic, Abingdon Health responded to the British government's 'call to arms' to produce a UK-made COVID-19 rapid antibody test. The company initiated the development of AbC-19 rapid antibody test, a test for the presence of neutralising IgG antibodies against the SARS-CoV-2 spike protein. As part of the programme of work, Abingdon Health led UK Rapid Test Consortium group which was a number of UK companies working collaboratively to manufacture tests to meet the government's anticipated demand. Test development commenced in early 2020 with AbC-19 achieving CE marking for professional use across the United Kingdom and the European Union in July 2020.

In October 2020 the UK government announced the signing of a deal with Abingdon Health for the supply of up to ten million AbC-19 rapid antibody tests, with an initial order of one million tests. These one million tests were delivered in full in January 2021, but initially the Department of Health and Social Care (DHSC) refused to pay for them, citing the Judicial Review as one of the reasons for this. The DHSC indicated in January 2021 that they would not be ordering any further tests from the supply agreement, citing the reason being because the Medicines and Health Regulatory Agency would not approve the tests for home use due to DHSC not providing a use case based on a link between a spike antibody levels and immunity to COVID-19. On 28 June 2022, Abingdon Health announced that it had reached a settlement agreement with the DHSC on the outstanding invoices payable by DHSC for lateral flow tests and component stock.

In March 2021, the UK Biobank included the AbC-19 rapid antibody test in a Coronavirus self-test antibody study to investigate the long-term health effects of SARS-CoV-2 infection ("Long COVID"). In April 2021, AbC-19 was paired with a mobile app to provide an antibody certificate solution. A semi-quantitative version of AbC-19 was launched in December 2021.

== Judicial Review ==
The Good Law Project (GLP) challenged the Secretary for Health and Social Care, claiming the COVID testing contracts with Abingdon Health were unlawful because they were not advertised nor open to competition, and the correct procurement process was bypassed, amongst other allegations. The Judicial Review was heard on 3 to 5 May 2022.

On conclusion of the judicial review hearing, Abingdon Health published the following statement in May 2022, "We and the Department of Health and Social Care (DHSC) provided strong arguments for dismissal at the judicial review hearing this week. Our position was clear: this was a straightforward purchase of goods/services by a public body from an established LFT provider on normal market terms. Nothing more! We stood up to offer our expertise in LFT development and manufacture at a time of national emergency and pandemic. In August 2021, we published our Detailed Grounds of Resistance submission to the court to address the factual inaccuracies being raised in this case."

On 7 October 2022 the High Court ruled that the contracts were lawful. "Mr Justice Waksman ruled in favour of the DHSC on all grounds, including lack of state aid to Abingdon Health and dismissed all claims brought by the GLP".
