= You're a Big Boy Now =

1966 film by Francis Ford Coppola

- Directed by: Francis Ford Coppola
- Screenplay by: Francis Ford Coppola
- Based on: You're a Big Boy Now; 1963 novel by David Benedictus
- Produced by: Phil Feldman
- Starring: Peter Kastner; Elizabeth Hartman; Geraldine Page; Rip Torn; Michael Dunn; Tony Bill; Karen Black; Julie Harris; Dolph Sweet; Michael O'Sullivan
- Cinematography: Andrew Laszlo
- Edited by: Aram Avakian
- Music by: Robert Prince
- Production company: Seven Arts Productions
- Distributed by: Warner Bros.-Seven Arts
- Release date: December 9, 1966
- Running time: 97 minutes
- Country: United States
- Language: English
- Budget: $1,000,000

You're a Big Boy Now is a 1966 American comedy film written and directed by Francis Ford Coppola. Based on David Benedictus' 1963 novel of the same name, it stars Elizabeth Hartman, Peter Kastner, Geraldine Page, her spouse Rip Torn, Karen Black, Tony Bill, Michael Dunn, and Julie Harris. Page was nominated for an Oscar and Golden Globe Award for her performance, while Hartman and the film were also nominated for the latter.

== Plot ==
Nineteen year old Bernard Chanticleer, called "Big Boy" by his parents, lives in Great Neck, New York with his overbearing, clinging mother and his commanding, disapproving father, who is curator of incunabula at the New York Public Library. Bernard works at the library as a low-level assistant. His father, who constantly monitors and admonishes him, decides Bernard is old enough to move out and into his own Manhattan apartment. His unhappy mother acquiesces to her husband's decision and arranges for Bernard to live in a rooming house run by nosy, prudish Miss Nora Thing. Miss Thing inherited the building on the condition that her late brother's aggressive pet rooster be allowed to occupy the fifth floor, which Bernard must pass to get to his room. Miss Thing reassures Bernard's mother that the rooster only attacks young, attractive women. Mrs. Chanticleer says her son is still uninterested in girls, but arranges with Miss Thing to report any "female" activity. Bernard's mother constantly mails locks of her hair to Bernard at his new residence.

Actually, Bernard is very interested in girls, but he is a naive, immature virgin. He is smitten from afar with the coldly beautiful actress Barbara Darling. Meanwhile, Amy Partlett, Bernard's grade-school classmate who now works in his father's office, confesses to Bernard that she has a crush on him. Bernard's worldly co-worker Raef Del Grado encourages him to date Amy because she's a "sure thing" (a girl that will sleep with him) and discourages him from trying to pursue Barbara. Bernard and Amy go on a date to a discotheque, but when Bernard sees Barbara performing as the featured go-go dancer, he is mesmerized by her and loses all interest in Amy. Amy tries to win him back by offering to spend the night with him and Bernard accepts, though he's thinking of Barbara the entire time. When they try to go to Bernard's room, the rooster attacks Amy, causing a commotion during which Miss Thing falls down the stairs and breaks her arm. Bernard's mother blames Amy, calling her a tramp and forbidding Bernard from seeing her again.

Bernard and his parents attend a play in which Barbara is acting. Bernard later writes her a gushing fan letter. She responds with an invitation to visit her in her dressing room after a future performance. Unaware that Barbara is a man-hating narcissist after being sexually assaulted as a young girl, Bernard rushes to the theater. He then bumbles his way through an evening at her apartment. Barbara, knowing she has control over Bernard, tries to seduce him, but he is unable to perform sexually. Bernard is upset, even though Barbara acts understanding.

Miss Thing tells Bernard's father that Bernard was out all night and that Amy called looking for him every 15 minutes while he was gone. Miss Thing and Bernard's father accidentally get trapped in a timelocked vault full of rare erotica, which horrifies her and causes her to rush out in disarray when the vault opens, giving the impression that Bernard's father made a pass at her. While this is going on, Amy tells Bernard that his father has, in fact, made a pass at her.

Barbara invites Bernard to move in with her, which is convenient for him, since he finds out when he goes to pack his things that Miss Thing has just evicted him. Barbara kicks him out when he gets to her apartment, only to call him back again, and, with nowhere else to go, Bernard returns to her. He still finds himself unable to perform with her, and by this point he's so confused that he even asks her to marry him, an offer that neither of the two seems to take very seriously. When Bernard returns to Barbara's apartment after walking his dog and discovers Raef there, in a bathrobe (Bernard's father has sent Raef to find Bernard), he gathers up his things and moves out.

Bernard returns to the library, where Amy and his parents have been discussing the situation and debating how to go about searching for Bernard. He tells his parents he's leaving right away to get away from them. Barbara and Raef arrive with Bernard's dog and reveal they have become engaged. Miss Thing and her new boyfriend, police officer Francis Graf, who lives in her boarding house, also arrive to confront Bernard's father about what happened in the vault. After some shouting, Bernard grabs his father's most prized library item, a Gutenberg Bible, and runs away with it. A slapstick chase through a street parade and a department store follows, ending when Barbara knocks Bernard out with a mannequin's leg. Barbara is featured in the newspaper for stopping a rare book thief and saving the Gutenberg Bible for the City of New York. Elated with her newfound fame, she dumps Raef. Bernard is jailed for his attempted "theft", but Amy bails him out. He realizes she's the girl for him, and they leave together.

== Cast ==
- Elizabeth Hartman as Barbara Darling
- Peter Kastner as Bernard Chanticleer
- Geraldine Page as Margery Chanticleer
- Rip Torn as I.H. Chanticleer
- Tony Bill as Raef del Grado
- Julie Harris as Miss Nora Thing
- Karen Black as Amy Partlett
- Dolph Sweet as Patrolman Francis Graf
- Michael Dunn as Richard Mudd
- Michael O'Sullivan as Kurt Doughty
- Ron Colby as stage play crew member
- Rufus Harley as stage play crew member
- Frank Simpson as stage play crew member
- Nina Varella as stage play crew member
- Len De Carl as stage play crew member

== Production ==
The idea for the film came from Tony Bill, who was a fan of David Benedictus' novel and hoped to play Bernard, but was cast instead as the duplicitous co-worker Raef Del Grado. Coppola made the film for a fee of $8,000 and on a budget of $800,000 as his thesis project for UCLA. The film ended up going over budget and costing close to $1 million, which it did not recoup until sold to television.

Coppola wrote the screenplay while on location in Europe for Seven Arts Productions working on Is Paris Burning? The screenplay changed some aspects of the novel: the setting was moved from London to New York City, Bernard's job was changed from a shoe store clerk to a library assistant, and an upbeat ending was added. Later, when You're a Big Boy Now was called a copy of Richard Lester's 1965 comedy The Knack ...and How to Get It, Coppola noted that it had been written before that film was released, although he said his film was "definitely influenced" by Lester's A Hard Day's Night.

The film was shot at Chelsea Studios in New York City, and at various Manhattan locations, including Times Square, Central Park, and the New York Public Library. The Library initially refused to permit filming on its premises due to concern that its daily operations would be disrupted and because it objected to the script's suggestion that the library maintained a vault full of erotica that its curator enjoyed visiting. However, with the help of then-Mayor John Lindsay, Coppola secured a permit to film in the library.

The chase through the department store was done at 11 a.m. during the store's normal operating hours, with no one outside the film's cast and crew having advance knowledge of the filming. Coppola and his crew concealed three cameras in carts and shopping bags and filmed the ensuing mayhem with natural light. Although multiple sources including Gene D. Phillips (in his biography of Coppola) have stated that this scene was filmed in Macy's department store, the signage shown in the film on both the exterior of the store building and the interior racks of clothing bears the name "Mays", a different department store chain then operating in New York City.

In the scene where Bernard roller skates through Manhattan streets after receiving Barbara's letter, the facade of the landmark original Pennsylvania Station (then in the process of being demolished) is briefly visible, with Madison Square Garden being constructed behind it.

The film scenes projected on the walls of the discotheque where Bernard and Amy go on a date are from Coppola's first directorial effort Dementia 13 (1963).

You're a Big Boy Now was released a year before Mike Nichols' The Graduate, which deals with similar themes of a young man getting involved with a predatory female and attempting to escape the societal conventions of his parents' generation. According to Mark Harris, when Nichols saw Coppola's film, he worried that it had "pre-empted" The Graduate.

Rip Torn and Geraldine Page, who played Bernard's parents I.H. and Margery Chanticleer, were husband and wife in real life at the time the film was made.

== Reception ==
On the review aggregator website Rotten Tomatoes, 73% of 15 critics' reviews are positive.

== Awards and honors ==
The film was presented at the 1967 Cannes Film Festival as the only American entry.

Geraldine Page was nominated for the Academy Award for Best Supporting Actress category for her performance as Bernard's mother Margery Chanticleer, but did not win. It was the fourth of her eight Oscar nominations during her career.

At the Golden Globe Awards, Page also received a nomination for the Golden Globe Award for Best Supporting Actress – Motion Picture. On top of that, Hartman was nominated for the Golden Globe Award for Best Actress – Motion Picture Comedy or Musical and the film itself was nominated for the Golden Globe Award for Best Motion Picture – Musical or Comedy.

== Music ==
Original songs for the film were composed by John Sebastian and Steve Boone of the Lovin' Spoonful, and the band performed several of the songs heard in the film. A soundtrack album credited to the Lovin' Spoonful was released in 1967 on Kama Sutra Records in connection with the film release. Two songs from the soundtrack, "Darling Be Home Soon" and "You're a Big Boy Now", were also released as singles, with "Darling Be Home Soon" reaching #15 on the U.S. charts and spawning many covers by other artists.

The jazz bagpiper Rufus Harley plays a small role in the film as a "Scottish pied piper" playing the Irish song "The Kerry Dance."

== See also ==
- List of American films of 1966
