= Heads, Bodies & Legs =

1951 edition (publ. Puffin Books)

Heads, Bodies & Legs is a 1946 children's book by Richard Chopping and Denis Wirth-Miller. The book was published by Puffin, and reprinted in 1951 and 1954. Each illustrated page of the book is divided into three separate flaps so that the reader can arrange them to form a variety of characters. These pages are preceded by a story written by Chopping.
