= The Fourth of June =

Novel by David Benedictus

- First edition
- Author: David Benedictus
- Cover artist: Richard Chopping (U.K. hardcover; U.S. hardcover & paperback editions)
- Language: English
- Publisher: Anthony Blond
- Publication date: 1962
- Publication place: United Kingdom
- Media type: Print
- Pages: 208
- OCLC: 232184

The Fourth of June is the first novel by David Benedictus.

The novel was considered controversial when published in 1962 as it describes scenes of violent bullying at Eton College, unrestrained class warfare and suggestions of schoolboy sexuality. It has some parallels with Tom Brown's School Days. It was adapted into a drama, produced in London in 1964 at the St Martin's Theatre.
