= The Saturday Book =

1941–1975 annual publication

The Saturday Book was an annual miscellany, published from 1941 to 1975, reaching 34 volumes. It was edited initially by Leonard Russell and from 1952 by John Hadfield. A final compilation, The Best of the Saturday Book, was published in 1981. The publisher throughout was Hutchinson's.

The Saturday Book provided literary and artistic commentary about life in Britain during the Second World War and the ensuing decades. It covered a range of arts, including ballet and music. Many writers contributed poems as well as essays.

The very first volume totaled 444 pages, but, with paper in short supply, the length of the second was slashed to 274 pages. From the third to the 24th volumes the number fluctuated between 288 and 304 pages, but the remaining ten ran to no more than 256 pages each, with the last one dropping to 240 pages.

In 2002 Nekta Publications published What's Where in The Saturday Books: A Comprehensive Guide and Index by Peter Rowland, 154 pages long, which provides an index and guide to the whole series.

== Contributors ==
The many writers who contributed to the series included Fred Bason, H. E. Bates, John Betjeman, Graham Greene, Laurie Lee, Philip Larkin, John Masefield, H. J. Massingham, George Orwell, J. B. Priestley, L. T. C. Rolt, Siegfried Sassoon, Evelyn Waugh, John Moore and P. G. Wodehouse.

The series was profusely illustrated with photographs, woodcuts and line drawings, many specially commissioned. Artists included Edward Ardizzone, Rowland Emett, L. S. Lowry, Laurence Scarfe and Richard Chopping. Photographers included Bill Brandt, Cecil Beaton, Douglas Glass and Edwin Smith. Wood engravers included Robert Gibbings, George Mackley and Agnes Miller Parker.

George Orwell's essay "Benefit of Clergy", intended for the volume published in 1944, was suppressed on grounds of obscenity, but its title remains in the table of contents.
