= David Benedictus =

English writer and theatre director (1938–2023)

- Born: David Henry Benedictus; 16 September 1938; London, England
- Died: 4 October 2023 (aged 85)
- Education: Eton College; Balliol College, Oxford; University of Iowa
- Spouse: Yvonne Antrobus (m. 1971; div. 2002)
- Children: 4, including Jolyon Maugham

David Henry Benedictus (16 September 1938 – 4 October 2023) was an English writer and theatre director, best known for his novels. His work included the Winnie-the-Pooh novel Return to the Hundred Acre Wood (2009). It was the first such book in 81 years.

== Life ==
Born on 16 September 1938 to chartered accountant Henry Jules Benedictus and Kathleen Constance (née Ricardo). He was educated at Eton College, Balliol College, Oxford, and the University of Iowa. His first novel The Fourth of June was a best-seller and he adapted it for the London stage. His second novel, You're a Big Boy Now, was made into a 1966 feature film directed by Francis Ford Coppola. He was an assistant to Trevor Nunn at the Royal Shakespeare Company. He has also worked as a commissioning editor for Drama at Channel 4, and ran the Book at Bedtime series for BBC Radio 4.

Benedictus previously wrote and produced audio readings of the Pooh stories, with Judi Dench as Kanga and Geoffrey Palmer as Eeyore. He sent the trustees of the A. A. Milne estate two sample stories of his sequel, and it took more than eight years for them to approve the project.

At the time of the book's publication he admitted to nerves over its reception, saying,

What's the worst thing that can happen, that I'll be torn apart by wild journalists? Happened before and I survived. At worst everyone will hate me and I'll just crawl under a bush and hide – I can live with that. Some people do hate the whole idea of a sequel, but it's not as if I'm doing any damage to the original, that will still be there. My hope is that people will finish reading a cracking story and just want more of them, and that's where I come in.

Michael Brown, chairman of the Pooh Properties Trust, said Benedictus had a "wonderful feel" for the world of Pooh. However, Publishers Weekly was cool on the book, describing it as "largely forgettable" and as missing "the charm of the first book".

Benedictus commented on his work in 1985, "Given peace of mind, financial independence, and a modicum of luck, I may produce a novel to be proud of one day." In March, 2014, he moved to Hove, a resort on the south coast of England, to be close to his extending family. He has four children, Jolyon Maugham KC, a barrister, Leo a journalist and novelist (The Afterparty, his first novel, was published by Jonathan Cape), Chloe a psychodynamic psychotherapist, and Jessica Campbell, a theatre producer.

Benedictus published an autobiography, Dropping Names, in 2005. According to an interview Benedictus gave to the Israeli newspaper Yediot Aharonot in 2009, he said that a cousin had done research into his surname and found out that it was actually "Baruch" (ברוך - having the same meaning as "Benedictus" in Hebrew), as well as research into how his ancestors emigrated to Britain, which revealed that they have Ashkenazi Jewish heritage.

Benedictus died suddenly on 4 October 2023, at the age of 85.

== Bibliography ==
- The Fourth of June (1962)
- You're a Big Boy Now (1963)
- This Animal is Mischievous (1965)
- Hump; or Bone By Bone Alive (1967)
- The Guru and the Golf Club (1969)
- World of Windows (1971)
- Junk!: How and Where to Buy Beautiful Things for Next to Nothing (1976)
- The Rabbi's Wife (1977)
- A Twentieth Century Man (1978)
- Lloyd George: A Novel (1981, from the screenplay of a BBC miniseries by Elaine Morgan)
- The Antique Collector's Guide (1981)
- Whose Life is it Anyway? (1982, from the play by Brian Clark)
- Local Hero (1983, from the screenplay by Bill Forsyth)
- Essential Guide to London (1984)
- Floating Down to Camelot (1985)
- Little Sir Nicholas (1990, with C. A. Jones)
- Odyssey of a Scientist (1991, with Hans Kalmus)
- Sunny Intervals and Showers: A Very British Passion (1992)
- The Stamp Collector (1994)
- What to Do When the Money Runs Out (2001, with Rupert Belsey)
- Dropping Names (2005)
- Return to the Hundred Acre Wood (2009)
