= The Rabbi's Wife =

Novel by David Benedictus

First edition (publ. Blond & Briggs)

The Rabbi's Wife is a 1977 novel by David Benedictus. The plot centers on the kidnapping of a rabbi's wife by Palestinian terrorists. At the time of its release, the book was reviewed in such publications as The Spectator, British Book News, and The Library Journal Book Review.

Rabbi David J. Zucker described the book's portrayal of how members of the rabbi's synagogue treated him after the kidnapping as "indifference", which he interpreted as a fictional example of the "loneliness of rabbinic life".
