= Fred Bason =

English bookseller, writer, and broadcaster

Fred Bason (1907-1973) was an English diarist, bookseller, writer and broadcaster most famously known for his four volumes of diaries that were published between 1950 and 1960.

== Life ==
Frederick Thomas Bason was born in Walworth, London on 29 August 1907. He always claimed himself to be a "true cockney", despite not having actually been born within the sound of 'Bow bells!' The only child of late in life parents, he remained a solitary individual for the majority of his life, never marrying himself. Although a lifelong bachelor, he lived much of his adult life with his housekeeper, Lizzie, of whom, from his diary entries, he was obviously very fond. Lizzie remained in his service until her death in 1960.

At an early age he started keeping his diaries and found his vocation in buying and selling rare and second-hand books. It was through his experience finding that publications had a much greater re-sale value with the author's signature, that a lifelong obsession with autographs began. His essays were a regular feature of every edition of The Saturday Book between 1945 and 1972, presenting his work on the same platform as major literary and artistic figures of postwar Britain.

Through his literary interest he met numerous famous individuals, and his published diaries were edited and introduced by literary figures such as Nicolas Bentley, Michael Sadleir, Leonard Strong and Noël Coward. He kept his diaries right up until his death on 3 July 1973 aged 65. Although having lived a rather humble life, living and dying in council rented property and always aspiring to earn just under the minimum UK Income Tax threshold, he left over £24,000 in his will, of which the majority was a bequest to set up a benevolent fund for writers.
