= Scotch & Soul =

Studio album by Rufus Harley
- Released: 1966
- Recorded: April 6 & 29, 1966; New York City
- Genre: Jazz
- Labels: Atlantic; SD 3006
- Producer: Joel Dorn

Rufus Harley chronology
| Bagpipe Blues (1965) | Scotch & Soul (1966) | A Tribute to Courage (1968) |

Scotch & Soul is the second album by piper and saxophonist Rufus Harley recorded in 1966 and released on the Atlantic label.

== Reception ==
Professional ratings
Review scores
| Source | Rating |
|---|---|
| Allmusic | 4.5/5 stars |

Allmusic awarded the album 4½ stars, stating, "The bagpipes tend to be a drone instrument and Harley cannot surmount the problem of cutting off notes quickly, but he plays his main instrument as well as anyone and is thus far the only jazz bagpipe player".

== Track listing ==
All compositions by Rufus Harley except as indicated

1. "Feeling Good" (Leslie Bricusse, Anthony Newley) – 7:22
2. "If You Could See Me Now" (Tadd Dameron, Carl Sigman) – 6:13
3. "Taurus the 20th" – 6:56
4. "Scotch & Soul" – 5:09
5. "Passing the Cup" – 4:02
6. "A Nightingale Sang in Berkeley Square" (Eric Maschwitz, Manning Sherwin) – 5:01
7. "Sufur" – 4:48

== Personnel ==
- Rufus Harley – bagpipes, flute, soprano saxophone, tenor saxophone
- Oliver Collins – piano
- James Glenn – bass
- Billy Abner – drums
- Robert Gosset – congas

Technical

- Phil Iehle – recording
