= This Animal Is Mischievous =

Novel by David Benedictus

- First edition (UK) (publ. Anthony Blond)
- Author: David Benedictus
- Language: English
- Publication date: 1965

This Animal Is Mischievous is a 1965 novel by David Benedictus. It is a satire about a British brother and sister who become involved in a battle between black activists and a fascist group. According to Time, the author's "discursive, Edwardian elegance of style is amusingly suited to satirizing upper-class pretentiousness, but his Negro characters are simply stereotypes and his twittering wittiness collapses at last into sentimentality."

The novel was also reviewed in the Los Angeles Times, Commonweal, The Spectator and other publications.
