= AbC-19 rapid antibody test =

Immunological test for COVID-19 exposure

The AbC-19 rapid antibody test is an immunological test for COVID-19 exposure developed by the UK Rapid Test Consortium and manufactured by Abingdon Health. It uses a lateral flow test to determine whether a person has IgG antibodies to the SARS-CoV-2 virus that causes COVID-19. The test uses a single drop of blood obtained from a finger prick and yields results in 20 minutes. The sensitivity of this test is 98.03% while the specificity is 99.56%. This test is paired with an easy-to-use mobile app which allows a trained professional to generate an antibody test certificate for storing on a person's smartphone.

== See also ==
- COVID-19 rapid antigen test
