= Good Law Project =

Jersey-based political non-profit company

- Formation: January 2017; 9 years ago
- Founder: Jolyon Maugham
- Type: Nonprofit
- Website: goodlawproject.org

The Good Law Project is a Jersey-based political non-profit company. Founded by Jolyon Maugham, the Good Law Project states that its mission is to achieve change and government accountability through the law.

== History ==
The Good Law Project was founded in January 2017 as a company limited by guarantee under English law headed by Maugham. It is a non-profit but not a registered charity. In 2019 it launched a crowdfunded challenge to the prorogation of Parliament by Boris Johnson's Conservative government, which was ultimately successful. The prorogation was ruled unlawful by the Supreme Court, but by this time Johnson's government had pushed through their Brexit deal so the issue was moot. However, the £200,000 raised enabled Good Law Project to hire more staff and launch other fundraisers to take on more cases.

The Good Law Project was criticised in The Critic magazine for exaggerating its success rate. A review in The Times of Maugham's book Bringing Down Goliath stated the Good Law Project was "founded to sue the government with money donated by gullible laymen, with a dismal success rate".

In May 2026, the GLP relocated to Jersey as a "purpose trust".

== Cases ==
=== 2022 public records matter ===
In the 2022 case of R (Good Law Project) v The Prime Minister [2022] EWHC 298 (Admin), the High Court was critical of the Good Law Project "drafting its objects clause so widely that just about any conceivable public law error by any public authority falls within its remit" and denied that "such a general statement of objects" could confer legal standing upon the company; the Court added, at paragraph 58 of the judgment, that the company could not be supposed as having "carte blanche to bring any claim for judicial review no matter what the issues and no matter what the circumstances". GLP appealed, and again lost.

=== Abingdon Health ===
The Good Law Project challenged the Secretary of State for Health and Social Care, claiming that the COVID testing contracts with Abingdon Health were unlawful because they were not advertised nor open to competition, and the correct procurement process was bypassed. On 7 October 2022 the High Court ruled that the contracts were lawful, so Good Law Project lost the case.

=== LGB Alliance ===
In September 2022, the charity Mermaids went to court to appeal the Charity Commission's decision to grant the LGB Alliance charitable status. This action was supported by the Good Law Project. The appeal was dismissed in July 2023 on the grounds that "the law does not permit Mermaids to challenge the decision made by the Charity Commission to register LGB Alliance as a charity".

=== Jason Arday ===
In July 2026, the Good Law Project published an open letter in support of University of Cambridge professor Jason Arday, who faced accusations of plagiarism and fabrication of aspects of his biography. Signed by more than 10,000 supporters, including Simon Woolley, Sonita Alleyne, Ijeoma Uchegbu, Simon Baron-Cohen, actor Colin Salmon, and politicians such as Green Party leader Zack Polanski, the letter stated that "Entirely false allegations of plagiarism were made against Professor Arday" and that "right-wing media have attempted to smear Professor Arday's reputation and undermine his career." Simon Baron-Cohen, Ijeoma Uchegbu, and Sonita Alleyne later withdrew their signatures. Arday resigned from Cambridge University while denying the allegations against him on 5 August 2026.

Following Arday's death on 14 August 2026, the Good Law Project opened a petition calling for a public inquiry into Arday's death, with signatories including Green Party Leader Zack Polanski, Labour Party MPs Diane Abbott, Nadia Whittome, Clive Lewis and Bell Ribeiro-Addy, as well as television presenter Carol Vorderman and former England and Chelsea footballer Eniola Aluko, citing "two weeks of relentless harassment" of Arday from media outlets.

=== Oxford Street Christmas lights ===
In October 2026 it was reported that the Good Law Project opened a petition calling against the Oxford Street Christmas lights which will carry the theme of Harry Potter. The reasons they gave where J.K. Rowling's views about transgender people, the use of the money and people feeling unwelcome.
