= Zero Minus Ten =

Novel by Raymond Benson

- First edition (UK)
- Author: Raymond Benson
- Cover artist: David Scutt
- Language: English
- Series: James Bond
- Genre: Spy fiction
- Published: 1997
- Publisher: Hodder & Stoughton (UK); G. P. Putnam's Sons (US)
- Publication place: United Kingdom
- Media type: Print (Hardcover and Paperback)
- Pages: 259 pp (first edition, hardback)
- ISBN: 0-340-68448-8 (first edition, hardback)
- OCLC: 38014268

Zero Minus Ten, published in 1997, is the first novel by Raymond Benson featuring Ian Fleming's James Bond following John Gardner's departure in 1996. Published in the United Kingdom by Hodder & Stoughton and in America by Putnam, the book is set in Hong Kong, China, Jamaica, England and some parts of Western Australia.

Benson's working title for the novel was No Tears for Hong Kong; this was eventually used as the title for the last chapter in the novel.

== Continuity ==
According to Raymond Benson, as far as character continuity was concerned, he had been given free lease by Ian Fleming Publications (then Glidrose Publications) to follow or ignore other continuation authors as he saw fit. Benson took a middle-of-the-road approach to this. While Benson treats Ian Fleming's novels as strictly canon, Gardner's novels are not, though there are some aspects that he adopts.

For instance, in Gardner's Win, Lose or Die Bond is promoted to Captain, but Benson's novels have Bond holding the rank of Commander again with no explanation. Some of Gardner's original recurring characters are also not present, including Ann Reilly (a.k.a. Q'ute), who, by the end of Gardner's era, had taken over Q Branch from Major Boothroyd; Benson features Major Boothroyd, again, with no explanation. Some of Gardner's changes do remain—for instance, Benson's Bond continues to smoke cigarettes from H. Simmons of Burlington Arcade, which dates from Gardner's For Special Services (1982). Additionally, the Bond girls Fredericka von Grüsse (Never Send Flowers / SeaFire), Harriet Horner (Scorpius), and Easy St. John (Death is Forever) are all mentioned. Benson's other novels also retain aspects of Gardner's series, though there is just as much that he ignores.

Some elements of the films also carry over into Benson's novels. M, for instance, is not Sir Miles Messervy, but the female M who was first introduced in the film GoldenEye (1995), although Gardner also introduced this character in his novelisation of that film and retained the character through his final novel COLD (1996). Bond also reverts to using his trusty Walther PPK, claiming he had switched to other guns (notably the ASP in Gardner's later novels), but felt that it was time he used it again. The follow-up to Zero Minus Ten, the novelization to Tomorrow Never Dies, has Bond switching to the Walther P99, which remains Bond's main weapon throughout Benson's novels. Later novels by Benson also attempt to insert some of the characters from the films into his story. In The Facts of Death, for instance, Admiral Hargreaves is present at a party.

== Plot summary ==
As the transfer of sovereignty over Hong Kong from the British to the People's Republic of China nears, Bond is given ten days to investigate a series of terrorist attacks that could disrupt the fragile handover and cause the breakout of a large-scale war. Simultaneously a nuclear bomb is test-detonated in the Australian outback. In Hong Kong, Bond suspects a British shipping magnate, Guy Thackeray, who he catches cheating at mahjong at a casino in Macau. Later, after cheating the cheater and winning a large sum of Thackeray's money, Bond attends a press conference where Thackeray announces that he is selling his company, EurAsia Enterprises, to the Chinese; not disclosed to the public is that this is due to a long-forgotten legal document that grants the descendants of Li Wei Tam ownership of the company if the British were to ever lose control of Hong Kong. Because the descendants were believed to have abandoned China, General Wong claims the document on behalf of the Chinese government and forces Thackeray out. Immediately following the announcement, Thackeray is killed by a car bomb planted by an unknown assassin, the latest of a series of assassinations that claimed the lives of the entire EurAsia board of directors, as well as several employees.

Through his Hong Kong contact, T.Y. Woo, Bond also investigates Li Xu Nan, the Triad head of the Dragon Wing society and the rightful descendant of Li Wei Tam. Li's identity as the Triad head is supposed to be a secret, though after Bond involves a hostess, Sunni Pei, 007 is forced to protect her from the Triads for breaking an oath of secrecy. When she is finally captured, Bond makes a deal, off the record, to go to Guangzhou and retrieve the long-forgotten document from General Wong that will give Li Xu Nan ownership of EurAsia Enterprises upon the handover at midnight on 1 July 1997. Through Li's contacts, Bond successfully travels and meets General Wong in Guangzhou under the guise of a solicitor from England. Bond's cover is later blown and T.Y. Woo, who followed Bond, is executed. Bond avenges his friend's death by killing General Wong, stealing the document, which he hand-delivers to Li Xu Nan, and rescuing Sunni Pei.

With Li Xu Nan in Bond's debt, Bond uses Li's contacts to go to Australia to investigate EurAsia Enterprises and find a link between it and the nuclear blast. As it turns out Thackeray is very much alive and has been mining unreported uranium in Australia to make his own nuclear bomb, which he plans to detonate in Hong Kong at the moment the handover takes place in retaliation for the loss of his family's legacy. Returning to Hong Kong, Bond, Li Xu Nan, and a Royal Navy captain track down Thackeray's nuclear bomb and defuse it. The battle claims the lives of Li Xu Nan as well as Thackeray, who is drowned by Bond in the harbour.

== Major characters ==
- James Bond – British Secret Service agent sent to investigate numerous terrorist attacks in Hong Kong as the transfer of sovereignty of Hong Kong from the British to the People's Republic of China nears.
- M – The successor to Sir Miles Messervy and the head of the British Secret Service, she sends Bond to investigate a number of terrorist attacks in Hong Kong that could potentially disrupt the fragile handover and cause the breakout of a large-scale war.
- Guy Thackeray – A British shipping magnate, his company EurAsia Enterprises is being stripped from him when the handover takes place on 1 July 1997. In retaliation Thackeray uses his company to build, test, and attempt to detonate a nuclear bomb in Hong Kong, making it uninhabitable.
- General Wong – A general from the People's Republic of China. Although a member of the Communist Party, he is a corrupt and greedy leader who attempts to claim EurAsia Enterprises not only for China, but for himself.
- Li Xu Nan – The head of the Dragon Wing Triad. He is the rightful descendant of Li Wei Tam and heir to EurAsia Enterprises when the handover takes place on 1 July 1997.
- Sunni Pei – A "Blue Lantern" (associated non-member) of the Dragon Wing Triad, she seemingly betrays Li Xu Nan by giving up his identity at a club to Bond. Subsequently, Bond feels obliged to protect her once Li Xu Nan issues a death warrant for her.
- T.Y. Woo – Working for the British Secret Service station in Hong Kong, he meets Bond upon his arrival. He later sets up Bond in a mahjong game at a casino in Macau so that Bond can get to know Guy Thackeray.

== Publication history ==
- UK first hardback edition, Hodder & Stoughton (ISBN 0-340-68448-8), 3 April 1997
- US first hardback edition, Putnam (ISBN 0-399-14257-6), 5 May 1997
- UK paperback edition, Coronet Books (ISBN 0-340-68449-6), 5 March 1998
- US paperback edition, Jove Books (ISBN 0-515-12336-6), August 1998
- Reissue with new introduction by Raymond Benson, Ian Fleming Publications, 5 October 2023

== See also ==
- Outline of James Bond
