= Outline of James Bond =

Fictional MI6 secret agent 007

The following outline is provided as an overview of and topical guide to James Bond:

James Bond is a fictional character created in 1953 by the journalist and fiction writer Ian Fleming, who featured him in 12 novels and two short story collections. The character has also been used in the long-running and third most financially successful English-language film series to date (behind only the Marvel Cinematic Universe and Star Wars). The film series started in 1962 with Dr. No, starring Sean Connery as James Bond, and has continued with other actors, including Robert Pattinson as the most recent actor to portray Bond.

== Characters ==
Gun barrel sequence

- James Bond (literary character)
  - Inspirations for James Bond
  - James Bond Jr.
  - Young Bond
  - Shaken, not stirred
  - Vesper cocktail
  - List of actors considered for the James Bond character
- Bond girl

=== Villains ===
- List of James Bond villains

=== Allies ===
- List of James Bond allies

== Novels ==
List of James Bond novels

- Ian Fleming Publications
  - Ian Fleming
    - Casino Royale (published in one US edition as You Asked for It)
    - Live and Let Die
    - Moonraker (published in one US edition as Too Hot to Handle)
    - Diamonds Are Forever
    - From Russia, with Love
    - Dr. No
    - Goldfinger
    - For Your Eyes Only
      - "From a View to a Kill"
      - "For Your Eyes Only"
      - "Quantum of Solace"
      - "Risico"
      - "The Hildebrand Rarity"
    - Thunderball
    - The Spy Who Loved Me
    - On Her Majesty's Secret Service
    - You Only Live Twice
    - The Man with the Golden Gun
    - Octopussy and The Living Daylights
      - "Octopussy"
      - "The Property of a Lady"
      - "The Living Daylights"
      - "007 in New York"
  - Kingsley Amis as Robert Markham
    - Colonel Sun
  - John Pearson
    - James Bond: The Authorized Biography of 007
  - Christopher Wood
    - James Bond, the Spy Who Loved Me (novelisation)
    - James Bond and Moonraker (novelisation)
  - John Gardner
    - Licence Renewed
    - For Special Services
    - Icebreaker
    - Role of Honour
    - Nobody Lives for Ever
    - No Deals, Mr. Bond
    - Scorpius
    - Win, Lose or Die
    - Licence to Kill (novelisation)
    - Brokenclaw
    - The Man from Barbarossa
    - Death Is Forever
    - Never Send Flowers
    - SeaFire
    - GoldenEye (novelisation)
    - Cold
  - Raymond Benson
    - Blast from the Past
    - Zero Minus Ten
    - Tomorrow Never Dies (novelisation)
    - The Facts of Death
    - "Midsummer Night's Doom"
    - Live at Five
    - The World Is Not Enough (novelisation)
    - High Time to Kill
    - DoubleShot
    - Never Dream of Dying
    - The Man with the Red Tattoo
    - Die Another Day (novelisation)
    - The Heart of Erzulie
  - Sebastian Faulks
    - Devil May Care
  - Jeffery Deaver
    - Carte Blanche
  - William Boyd
    - Solo
  - Anthony Horowitz
    - Trigger Mortis, featuring passages by Ian Fleming and based on his plot
    - Forever and a Day, prequel to Casino Royale and featuring passages by Ian Fleming
    - With a Mind to Kill
  - Dan Jones
    - All In
  - Charlie Higson (Young Bond)
    - SilverFin
    - Blood Fever
    - Double or Die
    - Hurricane Gold
    - By Royal Command
    - A Hard Man to Kill
    - On His Majesty's Secret Service
    - King Zero
  - Steve Cole (Young Bond)
    - Shoot to Kill
    - Heads You Die
    - Strike Lightning
    - Red Nemesis
  - Samantha Weinberg as Kate Westbrook (The Moneypenny Diaries)
    - Guardian Angel
    - Secret Servant
    - Final Fling
    - "For Your Eyes Only, James"
    - "Moneypenny's First Date with Bond"
  - Kim Sherwood (Double O)
    - Double or Nothing
    - A Spy Like Me
    - Hurricane Room
  - Raymond Benson (Felix Leiter)
    - The Hook and the Eye
  - Vaseem Khan (Q Mysteries)
    - Quantum of Menace
    - The Man with the Golden Compass
  - M. W. Craven
    - James Bond and the Secret Agent Academy

=== Related works ===
- The Diamond Smugglers (1957 book written by Fleming, based on research made for his fourth Bond novel)
- The James Bond Dossier
- The Book of Bond or, Every Man His Own 007
- For Bond Lovers Only
- The James Bond Bedside Companion
- Danger Society: The Young Bond Dossier
- Double O Seven, James Bond, A Report
- The Battle for Bond
- James Bond Encyclopedia
- For Your Eyes Only: Behind the Scenes of the James Bond Films
- Little Nellie 007
- James Bond: The Secret World of 007

== Films ==
Release timeline
| 1954 | Casino Royale (Climax!) |
1955
1956
1957
1958
1959
1960
1961
| 1962 | Dr. No |
| 1963 | From Russia with Love |
| 1964 | Goldfinger |
| 1965 | Thunderball |
1966
| 1967 | Casino Royale |
| 1967 | You Only Live Twice |
1968
| 1969 | On Her Majesty's Secret Service |
1970
| 1971 | Diamonds Are Forever |
1972
| 1973 | Live and Let Die |
| 1974 | The Man with the Golden Gun |
1975
1976
| 1977 | The Spy Who Loved Me |
1978
| 1979 | Moonraker |
1980
| 1981 | For Your Eyes Only |
1982
| 1983 | Octopussy |
| 1983 | Never Say Never Again |
1984
| 1985 | A View to a Kill |
1986
| 1987 | The Living Daylights |
1988
| 1989 | Licence to Kill |
1990
1991
1992
1993
1994
| 1995 | GoldenEye |
1996
| 1997 | Tomorrow Never Dies |
1998
| 1999 | The World Is Not Enough |
2000
2001
| 2002 | Die Another Day |
2003
2004
2005
| 2006 | Casino Royale |
2007
| 2008 | Quantum of Solace |
2009
2010
2011
| 2012 | Skyfall |
2013
2014
| 2015 | Spectre |
2016
2017
2018
2019
2020
| 2021 | No Time to Die |
2022
2023
2024
2025
2026
2027
| 2028 | Bond 26 |

- Production of the James Bond films
  - Eon Productions
    - Sean Connery
      - Dr. No
      - From Russia with Love
      - Goldfinger
      - Thunderball
      - You Only Live Twice
      - Diamonds Are Forever
    - George Lazenby
      - On Her Majesty's Secret Service
    - Roger Moore
      - Live and Let Die
      - The Man with the Golden Gun
      - The Spy Who Loved Me
      - Moonraker
      - For Your Eyes Only
      - Octopussy
      - A View to a Kill
    - Timothy Dalton
      - The Living Daylights
      - Licence to Kill
    - Pierce Brosnan
      - GoldenEye
      - Tomorrow Never Dies
      - The World Is Not Enough
      - Die Another Day
    - Daniel Craig
      - Casino Royale
      - Quantum of Solace
      - Skyfall
      - Spectre
      - No Time to Die
    - Robert Pattinson

8888 Bond 26

  - Non-Eon films and television episodes
    - "Casino Royale" – by CBS for Climax! television series – 1954
    - Casino Royale – by Columbia Pictures – 1967
    - Never Say Never Again – by Producers Sales Organization (as Taliafilm) – 1983
- List of James Bond films
- Portrayal of James Bond in film
- Motifs in the James Bond film series
- List of James Bond film locations
- Gun barrel sequence
- List of recurring characters in the James Bond film series
  - List of recurring actors in the James Bond film series
- Albert R. Broccoli
- Harry Saltzman
- Michael G. Wilson
- Barbara Broccoli

== Gadgets, vehicles and equipment ==
- List of James Bond vehicles
  - James Bond Car Collection
- List of James Bond gadgets

== Music ==
- James Bond music
  - John Barry
  - David Arnold
  - Thomas Newman
  - "James Bond Theme"
    - Monty Norman
    - "James Bond Theme (Moby's re-version)"
- Shaken and Stirred: The David Arnold James Bond Project
- Meets James Bond – Sounds Orchestral, 1965
- Mister James Bond – Jean-Jacques Perrey, 1968
- The Best of Bond... James Bond
- Soundtracks
  - Dr. No
    - "James Bond Theme"
  - From Russia with Love
  - Goldfinger
    - "Goldfinger"
  - Thunderball
  - You Only Live Twice
    - "You Only Live Twice"
  - On Her Majesty's Secret Service
    - "We Have All the Time in the World"
  - Diamonds Are Forever
  - Live and Let Die
    - "Live and Let Die"
  - The Man with the Golden Gun
  - The Spy Who Loved Me
    - "Nobody Does It Better"
  - Moonraker
  - For Your Eyes Only
    - "For Your Eyes Only"
  - Octopussy
    - "All Time High"
  - A View to a Kill
    - "A View to a Kill"
  - The Living Daylights
    - "The Living Daylights"
    - "Where Has Everybody Gone?"
  - Licence to Kill
    - "Licence to Kill"
    - "If You Asked Me To"
  - GoldenEye
    - "GoldenEye"
  - Tomorrow Never Dies
    - "Tomorrow Never Dies"
  - The World Is Not Enough
    - "The World Is Not Enough"
  - Die Another Day
    - "Die Another Day"
  - Casino Royale
    - "You Know My Name"
  - Quantum of Solace
    - "Another Way to Die"
  - Skyfall
    - "Skyfall"
  - Spectre
    - "Writing's On The Wall"
  - No Time to Die
    - "No Time to Die"

== Games ==
Release timeline
| 1982 | Shaken but Not Stirred |
1983
| 1984 | James Bond 007 |
| 1985 | A View to a Kill |
| 1985 | James Bond 007: A View to a Kill |
| 1986 | James Bond 007: Goldfinger |
| 1987 | The Living Daylights |
| 1988 | Live and Let Die |
| 1989 | 007: Licence to Kill |
| 1990 | The Spy Who Loved Me |
| 1990 | Operation Stealth |
| 1991 | James Bond Jr. |
1992
| 1993 | James Bond 007: The Duel |
1994
| 1995 | GoldenEye (dedicated) |
1996
| 1997 | GoldenEye 007 |
| 1998 | James Bond 007 (GB) |
| 1999 | Tomorrow Never Dies |
| 2000 | The World Is Not Enough (N64) |
| 2000 | The World Is Not Enough (PS) |
| 2000 | 007 Racing |
| 2001 | The World Is Not Enough (GBC) |
| 2001 | James Bond 007: Agent Under Fire |
| 2002 | James Bond 007: Nightfire |
2003
| 2004 | James Bond 007: Everything or Nothing |
| 2004 | GoldenEye: Rogue Agent |
| 2005 | James Bond 007: From Russia with Love |
2006
2007
| 2008 | 007: Quantum of Solace |
2009
| 2010 | GoldenEye 007 (remake) |
| 2010 | James Bond 007: Blood Stone |
2011
| 2012 | 007 Legends |
2013
2014
2015
2016
2017
2018
2019
2020
2021
2022
2023
2024
2025
| 2026 | 007 First Light |

- James Bond (games)
  - Video games:
    - Shaken but Not Stirred
    - James Bond 007
    - A View to a Kill
    - James Bond 007: Goldfinger
    - The Living Daylights
    - Live and Let Die
    - 007: Licence to Kill
    - The Spy Who Loved Me
    - Operation Stealth
    - James Bond Jr.
    - James Bond 007: The Duel
    - GoldenEye (handheld)
    - GoldenEye 007
    - James Bond 007 (GB)
    - Tomorrow Never Dies
    - The World Is Not Enough (N64)
    - The World Is Not Enough (PS)
    - 007 Racing
    - The World Is Not Enough (GBC)
    - Agent Under Fire
    - Nightfire
    - Everything or Nothing
    - GoldenEye: Rogue Agent
    - From Russia with Love
    - Quantum of Solace
    - GoldenEye 007 (remake)
    - Blood Stone
    - 007 Legends
    - James Bond: World of Espionage
    - Cypher 007
    - 007 First Light
  - Role-playing game
    - James Bond 007, Role-Playing in Her Majesty's Secret Service

== Parodies, spin-offs and fandom ==
- GoldenEye: Source
- James Bond Car Collection
- James Bond comics
  - James Bond comic strip
  - List of James Bond comics
- 005
- James Bond Jr.
  - The Adventures of James Bond Junior 003½
  - List of James Bond Jr. characters
  - List of James Bond Jr. episodes
  - Video game
- Evil Genius (video game)
- Avakoum Zahov versus 07
- Per Fine Ounce
- The Killing Zone
- "Your Deal, Mr. Bond"
- Night Probe!
- Trading Futures
- Austin Powers
  - Austin Powers (character)
  - Austin Powers: International Man of Mystery
  - Austin Powers: The Spy Who Shagged Me
  - Austin Powers in Goldmember
- Carry On Spying
- Hot Enough for June
- Dr. Goldfoot and the Bikini Machine
  - Dr. Goldfoot and the Girl Bombs
- Licensed to Kill
- Our Man Flint
  - In Like Flint
- Johnny English series
  - Johnny English
  - Johnny English Reborn
  - Johnny English Strikes Again
- Kiss the Girls and Make Them Die
- Kingsman
  - Kingsman: The Secret Service
  - Kingsman: The Golden Circle
- The Last of the Secret Agents
- O.K. Connery
- Get Smart
- Archer
- The Incredible World of James Bond
- James Bond fandom
- Hot Shots Calendar 0014
- Spy Fox

== See also ==
- Bibliography of works on James Bond
- Outline of fiction
- James Bond (literary character), information about the literary character
- Inspirations for James Bond, the people who Ian Fleming used as an inspiration for James Bond
- List of James Bond films, for plot synopses, awards, and box office information for each film in the series
- Motifs in the James Bond film series, the motifs that appear in the series of Bond films
- Portrayal of James Bond in film, information about the film character
- James Bond in video games, the series of video and computer games based on the character and the film series
- James Bond music, the music for the James Bond movies
- James Bond (comic strip)
- James Bond (comics)
- The "James Bond Theme", the main theme for the James Bond movies
- Universal United Kingdom, theme park planning to star James Bond
