= Brokenclaw =

Novel by John Gardner (British writer)

- First UK hardback edition
- Author: John Gardner
- Language: English
- Series: James Bond
- Genre: Spy fiction
- Publisher: Hodder & Stoughton
- Publication date: July 1990
- Publication place: United Kingdom
- Media type: Print (Hardcover and Paperback)
- ISBN: 0-399-13541-3 (first edition, hardback)
- OCLC: 21441940
- Dewey Decimal: 823/.914 20
- LC Class: PR6057.A63 B7 1990

Brokenclaw, first published in 1990, was the tenth novel by John Gardner featuring Ian Fleming's secret agent, James Bond. Carrying the Glidrose Publications copyright, it was first published in the United Kingdom by Hodder & Stoughton and in the United States by Putnam. The book title is sometimes presented as two words, but is correctly one word since it is a character name.

Instead of picking up where the novelisation Licence to Kill left off, Brokenclaw completely ignores the story's events and continues from Win, Lose or Die.

== Plot summary ==
After expressing frustration over a lack of action after his year-long mission with the Royal Navy (as detailed in Win, Lose or Die), Bond threatens to resign. Instead, M orders Bond to take a vacation. Bond travels to Victoria, British Columbia where he is intrigued by Lee Fu-Chu, a half-Blackfoot, half-Chinese philanthropist who is known as "Brokenclaw" because of a deformed hand.

Later, Bond is ordered to San Francisco where he is tasked to investigate the kidnapping of several scientists who have been working on a new submarine detection system and an "antidote" known as LORDS and LORDS DAY. Bond and CIA agent Chi-Chi Sue go undercover using the codenames Peter Abelard and Héloïse that were assigned to two agents from the People's Republic of China that are sent to evaluate the submarine technology before purchasing it.

Ultimately, Bond discovers that Brokenclaw is involved in this scheme on behalf of China, and also has plans of his own which involve sparking a worldwide economic disaster by bringing about the collapse of the dollar by tapping into the New York Stock Exchange, which would in turn bring down other major currencies worldwide. The plan, dubbed Operation Jericho was a long-term plan initially started by the Japanese, but now believed to have been worked on simultaneously by the Chinese before being acquired by Brokenclaw.

Brokenclaw's hideout in California is raided by Special Forces after he is located by Naval Intelligence officer Ed Rushia who was searching and attempting to help Bond and Chi-Chi while on their mission. Brokenclaw escapes the raid only to be tracked down by Bond and Rushia, off the books, to the Chelan Mountains of Washington where Bond is challenged to a torture ritual known as o-kee-pa. In the end, the competition comes down to a fight between the two using bow and arrows; Brokenclaw barely misses Bond and in turn is shot through the neck by Bond's arrow.

== Characters ==
- James Bond
- M
- Bill Tanner
- Ann Reilly
- Brokenclaw: Half Chinese, half Blackfoot, he was born Lee Fu-Chu. He received the name "Brokenclaw" because of a deformity in his left hand where his thumb is on the right (viewing the palm up) rather than the left. Brokenclaw is a crime lord in San Francisco who has a large hold on the city's prostitution, gambling, and drug rackets. He also works for CELD (Central External Liaison Department), the intelligence service of the People's Republic of China, and possibly CCI (Central Control of Intelligence). Brokenclaw has managed to get his hands on a new technology that can detect submarine signatures which he plans to give to CELD. Additionally, Brokenclaw also plans to cause economic disaster by bringing about the collapse of the dollar. Ultimately Brokenclaw's plans are prevented by Bond. He later retreats to a getaway location in the Chelan Mountains of Washington. There he challenges Bond to a ritual known as o-kee-pa. During this competition he is shot by Bond in the neck with an arrow.
- Miss Sue Chi-Ho: Known to her friends as Chi-Chi Sue or simply Chi-Chi, she is on loan from the CIA. She can speak fluent Cantonese and was previously a U.S. Naval Intelligence officer. She accompanies Bond on Operation Curve posing as Jenny Mo, an operative codenamed Héloïse from the People's Republic of China who was sent to evaluate Brokenclaw's submarine detection technology.
- Ed Rushia: A Commander with U.S. Naval Intelligence. He is tasked with following Bond and Chi-Chi to ensure their safety throughout their mission. After Bond and Chi-Chi disappear, Rushia searches California for them. After eventually picking up their signal he helps Bond escape a deathtrap in which Bond is thrown to Brokenclaw's wolves. He later teams up with Bond, off the record, to find Brokenclaw in Washington after Brokenclaw's hideout is raided.
- Wanda Man Song Hing: A Lieutenant Commander in the U.S. Navy, Wanda is undercover posing as Brokenclaw's lover. Her father who owed Brokenclaw an enormous sum of money gave her (willingly to go undercover) to Brokenclaw as compensation. She is later discovered and as retribution her father is thrown to the wolves while she is badly tortured.
- Agents Nolan and Wood: Crooked FBI agents who are working secretly for Brokenclaw. They discover Bond is not who he claims to be and capture him for Brokenclaw. They later capture Chi-Chi for Brokenclaw and attempt to hold her ransom. They are eventually arrested by Ed Rushia.

== Publication history ==
- U.S. first hardback edition: 1 August 1990 Putnam
- UK first hardback edition: September 1990 Hodder & Stoughton
- UK first paperback edition: October 1991 Coronet Books
- U.S. first paperback edition: 1991 Berkley Books

== See also ==
- Outline of James Bond
