= Cold (novel) =

Novel by John Gardner (British writer)

- First UK edition cover
- Author: John Gardner
- Language: English
- Series: James Bond
- Genre: Spy fiction
- Publisher: Hodder & Stoughton
- Publication date: 2 May 1996
- Publication place: United Kingdom
- Media type: Print (Hardcover and Paperback)
- Pages: 264 pp (first edition, hardback)
- ISBN: 0-340-65765-0 (first edition, hardback)
- OCLC: 60303934

Cold, first published in 1996, was the sixteenth and final novel by John Gardner featuring Ian Fleming's secret agent, James Bond (including Gardner's novelizations of Licence to Kill and GoldenEye). Carrying the Glidrose Publications copyright, it was first published in the United Kingdom by Hodder & Stoughton and in the United States by Putnam.

In the United States, the book was retitled Cold Fall. This was the first time an original Bond novel had been given a different title for American book publication, other than for reasons of spelling, since Fleming's Moonraker was initially published there under the title Too Hot to Handle in the mid-1950s. The British title is properly spelled as an acronym (with no full stops), but it is also common to find it spelt Cold.

== Plot summary ==
The novel is split into two books, one called "Cold Front" and the second entitled "Cold Conspiracy". The time between each book appears to be the time period allotted to Gardner's previous Bond outings, Never Send Flowers and SeaFire. The story opens with the crash of a Boeing 747-400 at Dulles International Airport in Fairfax and Loudoun counties, Virginia, near Washington, D.C., and the apparent death of Bond's friend and lover, the Principessa Sukie Tempesta. Bond is then sent by M to the airport with an investigation team which leads to meetings with FBI agent Eddie Rhabb.

The main action takes place in Italy at the home of the Tempesta brothers, Luigi and Angelo, where Bond gets caught in the act with one of the brothers' wives. As James later explains to M, the lady made the advances. The enemy of the story is provided by a terrorist army called COLD, which stands for Children Of the Last Days.

== Major characters ==
- James Bond, British Secret Service agent. The FBI sends him to investigate the Tempesta brothers, as part of a complex operation. The real motives behind the FBI involvement are to discover the identity of the leader of COLD, to which the Tempesta family has been recruited.
- M (Sir Miles Messervy), the head of the British Secret Service. Age has finally caught up with him: after being kidnapped by COLD troops, he retires from the Service. At the end of the book, it is mentioned that the new M is a woman, putting everything in continuity with GoldenEye.
- Luigi Tempesta - A suave Italian prince, who, behind a façade of legitimate wealth, pulls the strings of a colossal criminal empire.
- General Brutus "Brute" Clay – A retired U.S. Army general, initially described as a crazy has-been with a passion for wargames and historical reenactment. Despite being borderline psychotic, he's a brilliant tactician and the commander-in-chief of the Children Of the Last Days.

== Publication history ==
- UK hardback (first edition), Hodder & Stoughton (ISBN 0-340-65765-0), 2 May 1996
- US hardback, Putnam (ISBN 0-399-14149-9), June 1996
- UK paperback, Coronet Books (ISBN 0-340-65766-9), 5 September 1996
- US paperback, Berkley Books (ISBN 0-425-15902-7), July 1997

== See also ==
- Outline of James Bond
