= No Deals, Mr. Bond =

Novel by John Gardner (British writer)

- First edition cover
- Author: John Gardner
- Cover artist: Trevor Scobie (Jonathan Cape ed.)
- Language: English
- Series: James Bond
- Genre: Spy novel
- Publisher: Jonathan Cape
- Publication date: 21 May 1987
- Publication place: United Kingdom
- Media type: Print (Hardcover and Paperback)
- Pages: 224 pp (first edition, hardback)
- ISBN: 0-224-02449-3 (first edition, hardback)
- OCLC: 15548761

No Deals, Mr. Bond, first published in 1987, was the sixth novel by John Gardner featuring Ian Fleming's secret agent, James Bond. Carrying the Glidrose Publications copyright, it was first published in the United Kingdom by Jonathan Cape and in the United States by Putnam. It was the last Bond novel to be published in Britain by Jonathan Cape, ending an association dating back to the first Bond novel, Casino Royale in 1953.

No Deals, Mr. Bond has the minor distinction of being the first and, thus far, only non-novelisation James Bond novel to incorporate the agent's name into the title.

== Plot summary ==
No Deals, Mr. Bond begins with a mission in the Baltic Sea dubbed "Seahawk", which involves James Bond stealthily extracting two women that have completed an assignment in East Germany.

After accomplishing his mission, the book continues five years later with Bond being called in by M to learn more background into what those women were doing there before being extracted. Their mission, dubbed Cream Cake, was a honey trap that involved getting close to top Soviet personnel as a means to not only spy for the British Secret Service, but to secure the defection of two high ranking Soviet officers, an act that the Soviets occasionally performed against countries of the West.

Involving four women and a man, the operation was considered a complete debacle that ended with the members being found out. After being extracted and given new identities, however, two of the women were discovered to have been gruesomely murdered - with their tongues cut out. Bond is subsequently sent by M, "off the record", to find the remaining members of Cream Cake before they suffer the same fate.

Bond goes to the first, Heather Dare, who owns a beauty salon in London. They are ambushed, but Bond manages to overpower the perpetrator. He and Dare escape, but soon receive the news that a third of the moles, Ebbie Heritage, Dare's friend, has also been murdered in Dublin.

When Bond and Dare make it to Dublin, Bond makes contact with a police officer, Murray, to get information about the murder. It turns out that Heritage lent her raincoat to another woman and that it is the other woman who was murdered.

In addition, Murray has learned that Max Smolin, the HVA man Dare was supposed to seduce, is now in Ireland and has managed to shake off the guard - and there are also rumors that someone even higher up in the Russian hierarchy is there. The presence of Smolin, who also worked for SMERSH, Bond's old enemy, makes Bond suspect that the entire Cream Cake operation has been exposed, right from the start.

On the way, Bond and Dare see Smolin and try to get away again, but are captured by Smolin. Bond tries to trick Smolin, who doesn't buy into it, and takes the pair to the HVA's castle, where Heritage is also located. Smolin begins a torture session, but when he is left alone with Bond, he reveals that he is actually a double agent for MI6. Also, he is helping Susanne Dietrich, a captain of HVA, who was in turn lured by Jungle Baisley, the only male agent of the operation.

He proves it to Bond, but is in turn ambushed by the other guards. Together, Bond and Smolin manage to defeat the guards, take Dare and Heritage with them and escape the castle, just as KGB General Konstantin Chernov arrives.

The group split and head to different hotels: Bond and Heritage go together, as do Smolin and Dare. In the middle of the night, Bond tries to contact Smolin, who, however, has checked out of the hotel. He tries to save Heritage, but she is gone. Soon after, Bond is captured by Chernov and is transported back to the castle. At the last second, however, he is rescued from Chernov's car by Murray.

Murray has been ordered to drive Bond out of the country and take him to a plane that will take him to Paris. Waiting in the plane is Heritage, who managed to hide when Chernov's men appeared.

Having managed to wiretap the castle, Bond has learned that the last mole, "Jungle" Baisley, is in Hong Kong with Susanne Dietrich. Additionally, in Paris, Bond is given extra equipment by MI6's Q department before Bond takes Heritage to Hong Kong. Once there, Bond meets his contact Big Thumb Chang, who supplies him with weapons, and Swift, who planned the entire Cream Cake operation. Swift tells him that M has ordered Bond to capture Chernov.

Bond takes Heritage to the island of Cheung Chau, where Chernov and his men manage to capture them. Bond still wonders which of the moles or the others who know Cream Cake are the traitors, but Chernov won't let him find out. The General uses Bond as prey on a hunting trip in the night. Bond manages to kill the pursuers and return to base where he discovers that Murray and Heather have worked to ensure that everyone who has had anything to do with Cream Cake, is handed over to SMERSH and eliminated. Bond kills Heather and Murray and forces Chernov to free Ebbie, Jungle, Susanne and Smolin.

== Characters ==
- James Bond
- M
- Ebbie Heritage: Her real name is Emilie Nikolas and she was a member of operation Cream Cake and was one of the two women that were extracted by Bond during Seahawk. Ebbie was tasked with meeting and seducing a Major in the East German Army.
- Colonel Maxim Smolin: Born in 1946, Smolin, codenamed "Basilisk", was the prime target during the operation known as Cream Cake. At the time Smolin was the second in command of the HVA (the East German Intelligence Service). Smolin is also employed by the Soviet GRU. Unknown to the intelligence agencies of the Soviet Union, Smolin is a turncoat secretly working with the British Secret Service.
- General Konstantin Nikolaevich Chernov: Codenamed "Blackfriar", Chernov (also known as Kolya Chernov) is the Chief Investigating Officer of Department Eight, Directorate S of the KGB, a section formerly known as Department V (see Icebreaker), and, before that, SMERSH. Chernov is systematically targeting the former members of Cream Cake as well as Colonel Maxim Smolin and Captain Dietrich who have since defected. Chernov is arrested by Bond in Hong Kong on M's orders.
- Heather Dare: Her real name is Irma Wagen and she was a member of operation Cream Cake. Dare was tasked with meeting and seducing Colonel Maxim Smolin. Dare was also one of the two women that was extracted by Bond during Seahawk. She is later discovered to be an agent of the KGB and working for General Chernov. Under orders by M that the Cream Cake double be eliminated, Dare is essentially executed by Bond after being disarmed, an act Bond performs without remorse.
- Inspector Norman Murray: an inspector for the Republic of Ireland's Special Branch. He lends aid to Bond (known to Murray as "Jacko B") while Bond is in the Republic of Ireland. Secretly, however, Murray is on Chernov's payroll and eventually turns on Bond. He is later killed in Hong Kong by Bond.

== Publication history ==
Gardner states that he was opposed to this novel being given the title No Deals, Mr. Bond, a title he calls "dreadful" along with other titles suggested by his publishers including Oh No, Mr. Bond! and Bond Fights Back. Gardner originally suggested the title Tomorrow Always Comes.

- UK first hardback edition: May 1987 Jonathan Cape
- U.S. first hardback edition: April 1987 Putnam
- UK first paperback edition: 1987 Coronet Books
- U.S. first paperback edition: April 1988 Charter Books

== See also ==
- Outline of James Bond
