= Role of Honour =

Novel by John Gardner (British writer)

- First edition cover
- Author: John Gardner
- Cover artist: Trevor Scobie (Jonathan Cape ed.)
- Language: English
- Series: James Bond
- Genre: Spy fiction
- Publisher: Jonathan Cape
- Publication date: 1984
- Publication place: United Kingdom
- Media type: Print (Hardcover and Paperback)
- Pages: 224 pp (first edition, hardback)
- ISBN: 0-224-02973-8 (first edition, hardback)
- OCLC: 11303086

Role of Honour, first published in 1984, was the fourth novel by John Gardner featuring Ian Fleming's secret agent, James Bond. Carrying the Glidrose Publications copyright, it was first published in the United Kingdom by Jonathan Cape and in the United States by Putnam.

== Plot summary ==
After receiving a large inheritance, James Bond 007 is accused of improprieties and drummed out of the British Secret Service. Disgusted with his former employers, Bond places his services on the open market, where he later attracts the attention of representatives of SPECTRE who are quite willing to put their one-time enemy on their payroll. But the whole thing was a hoax, just a plan to get Bond inside the enemy's organization.

Prior to joining up, Bond spends a month in Monte Carlo with Miss 'Percy' Proud, a CIA agent who teaches him everything she knows about programming languages and computers in general. This background allows Bond to attract Jay Autem Holy, an agent of SPECTRE who left the Pentagon, faked his death, and later started a computer game company that creates simulations based on real-life battles and wars.

Bond's allegiance to SPECTRE is periodically questioned throughout the novel, even at one point going so far as to send Bond to a terrorist training camp (known as "Erewhon") to see if he has 'the right stuff'. Proving his worth, Bond becomes involved in a plot to destabilise the Soviet Union and the United States, by forcing them to rid the world of their nuclear weapons.

What SPECTRE leaders Tamil Rahani and Dr. Jay Autem Holy suspect, but never fully realise is that Bond's resignation is false. Along with Bond, the Secret Service plays a vital role in foiling SPECTRE; however, Rahani, the current leader of SPECTRE is able to escape Bond's clutches by parachuting out of an airship over Switzerland.

== Characters ==
- James Bond
- M
- Bill Tanner
- Q
- Persephone 'Percy' Proud: Formerly Mrs. Jay Autem Holy. Percy is a CIA agent who went deep undercover by marrying Holy. After Holy's faked death, she teams with Bond to teach him everything she knows about Holy and everything she knows about programming languages and computers in general.
- Jay Autem Holy: supposedly died in a plane crash, prior to the events in Role of Honour. He now goes under the name Jason St. John Finnes and is secretly an agent of SPECTRE. Holy is an elite computer programmer once working for The Pentagon; he now owns and manages a software company that develops computer game simulations based on real-life wars and battles. He is the former husband of Percy Proud and current husband to Dazzle. Holy is killed by Rahani after finding out he was betrayed.
- General Rolling Joe Zwingli: is an accomplice Jay Autem Holy and long-time friend. He also was supposedly killed in the plane crash. Zwingli is killed by one of Rahani's personnel after finding out he was double-crossed.
- Tamil Rahani:Part American, part Lebanese, he is the chairman and principal shareholder of Rahani Electronics and secretly the head of SPECTRE. He manages the Erewhon terrorist training camp along with his right-hand man, Simon. Unlike most of the villains in a James Bond novel or film, Rahani actually lives and flees from capture. Bond is later informed that Rahani was secretly having a love affair with Dazzle, Holy's second wife.
- Freddie Fortune: is an informant for Bond that he uses to get closer to Holy.
- Cindy Chalmer: is a programmer who works for Holy at Endor. She is in league with Percy and an informant for her and the CIA.
- Peter Amadeus: is a programmer who works for Holy at Endor. He later escapes with the help of Bond and is used by the British Secret Service to one-up SPECTRE. He later takes a job within the Secret Service as a computer programmer.

== Cars ==
Bond purchases a brand new British racing green Bentley Mulsanne Turbo with magnolia interior. Likewise with the Silver Beast, Bond had CCS outfit the car with a long-range telephone and a hidden weapon compartment. Bentley had apparently requested that Gardner not outfit the car with any gadgets other than the telephone.

== Publication history ==
- UK first hardback edition: October 1984 Jonathan Cape
- U.S. first hardback edition: September 1984 Putnam
- UK first paperback edition: 1985 Coronet Books
- U.S. first paperback edition: May 1985 Berkley Books

== Reviews ==
Kirkus Reviews dismissed the book as "a ragged quickie that's cartoon caper/sleuth action most of the way through (like an old episode of TV's The Avengers). Virtually no humor, virtually no suspense, and virtually no charm or sexiness in old 007 - making this by far the weakest of Gardner's somewhat pre-sold fabrications, with some extra appeal only for computer fans."

The West Coast Review of Books said that "John Gardner does a good job of work in picking up the torch from the late Ian Fleming, but the freshness of the early Bond books is missing; also, 007's predictable heroics have begun to bore. One can accept a charmed - and charming - character just so long."

The Globe and Mail crime critic Derrick Murdoch wrote that although Gardner "could outperform Fleming easily in most technical respects he lacked Fleming's gift for simple-minded razzle-dazzle extravaganzas and Penthouse-style dream girls." He called Role of Honour "something of a disappointment, although some of Bond's old admirers may welcome it." He complained that the novel was both familiar and confusing.

Long-time Gardner admirer and Listener crime critic Marghanita Laski said "John Gardner has gradually worked himself into his own role as owner-creator of James Bond, but his Bond is more intelligent, more sensitive than the original."

Novelist Jessica Mann, writing for British Book News, said Role of Honour "hits the spot and will give great pleasure to fans both on the page, and, presumably, on the screen."

== See also ==
- Outline of James Bond
