= Seafire =

Seafire could refer to:

- Supermarine Seafire, a British naval fighter in service during WW2 and immediate post-war
- SeaFire, a James Bond novel
- Seafire (bioluminescence), Marine Bioluminescence
- French naval radar SeaFire, developed by Thales Group, in service since 2021.
