= Nobody Lives for Ever =

Novel by John Gardner (British writer)

- First edition cover
- Author: John Gardner
- Cover artist: Trevor Scobie (Jonathan Cape ed.)
- Language: English
- Series: James Bond
- Genre: Spy fiction
- Publisher: Jonathan Cape
- Publication date: 26 June 1986
- Publication place: United Kingdom
- Media type: Print (hardback and paperback)
- Pages: 192 pp (first edition, hardback)
- ISBN: 0-224-02861-8 (first edition, hardback)
- OCLC: 13271769

Nobody Lives for Ever (published in American editions as Nobody Lives Forever), first published in 1986, was the fifth novel by John Gardner featuring Ian Fleming's secret agent, James Bond. Carrying the Glidrose Publications copyright, it was first published in the United Kingdom by Jonathan Cape and in the United States by Putnam.

== Plot summary ==
En route to retrieve his faithful housekeeper, May, from a European health clinic where she is recovering from an illness, Bond is warned by the British Secret Service that Tamil Rahani, the current leader of SPECTRE, now dying from wounds suffered due to his last encounter with Bond (as described in Role of Honour), has put a price on Bond's head. "Trust no one," Bond is warned. Soon after, May and Miss Moneypenny, who had been visiting his housekeeper are reported missing, and Bond finds himself dodging would-be assassins while searching for his friends, assisted by a young débutante and her capable, yet mysterious, female bodyguard.

The price on Bond's head is a competition orchestrated by Rahani and SPECTRE known as 'The Head Hunt', and is an open contest to anyone willing to capture, kill, or present Bond to Rahani, where he would be subsequently decapitated by guillotine. Along Bond's journey of attempting to rescue Moneypenny and May, Bond is betrayed and chased by a number of people and organisations, including his own British Secret Service ally, Steve Quinn who has defected to the KGB, corrupted police officers, and agents of SPECTRE in disguise.

== Characters ==
- James Bond
- M
- Miss Moneypenny
- May
- Principessa Sukie Tempesta is an Italian Princess whom Bond saves while driving to check up on his Scottish housekeeper, May. He later sees her again and offers to drive her home to Rome; however, these plans are cut short after Bond learns of the price on his head. She stays with Bond acting as a hostage and later refusing to leave his side in his moment of need. She is accompanied after her second meeting with Bond by her friend and bodyguard, Nannie.
- Nannette 'Nannie' Norrich is the head of an all-female bodyguard organisation, NUB (aka Ularon), tasked to protect Sukie. The two are good friends; however, Sukie is unaware that Nannie has entered the competition as a freelancer and has promised Rahani to deliver Bond to him.
- Herr Doktor Kirchtum is the doctor who was overseeing May while she was at the clinic. After Moneypenny and May were kidnapped, Kirchtum was taken captive by Steve Quinn and forced to send instructions to Bond. Bond later frees Kirchtum only to learn later that Kirchtum was actually in league with Quinn. Kirchtum is subsequently killed by either Nannie or Sukie (the identity is never given) upon attempting to rescue 007 from Kirchtum and Quinn's clutches.
- Steve Quinn is the British Secret Service's man in Rome. He is sent by M to assist Bond in fleeing mainland Europe so that Bond can return to London. Unbeknownst to everyone, Quinn has defected to the KGB and currently works for SMERSH (now known as Department Eight). Quinn is assisted in capturing Bond by Doktor Kirchtum, and, like the latter, is killed by either Nannie or Sukie (the identity is never given).
- Tamil Rahani is the leader of SPECTRE, previously in Role of Honour. After parachuting from an airship at the end of Role of Honour to escape capture by Bond, he landed badly and injured his spine, which led to terminal cancer. Throughout the book, Rahani is said to have only a short time left to live. Knowing the end is near, Rahani initiates the 'Head Hunt' to capture Bond. Rahani is killed by Bond after having his bed rigged to detonate upon pushing the adjustment control button.

== Cover art ==
Nobody Lives for Ever is the last time (to date) the trademark "wood grain" cover art has been used on a Bond novel. It was first seen on From Russia, with Love in 1957.

== Publication history ==
- UK first hardback edition: June 1986 Jonathan Cape
- U.S. first hardback edition: May 1986 Putnam
- Thai language first edition: December 1986 Kangaroo (Jing Jo) Press
- UK first paperback edition: August 1987 Coronet Books
- U.S. first paperback edition: July 1987 Charter Books

== Reception ==
Critics were generally more enthusiastic about this Gardner Bond novel than his previous entries.

Publishers Weekly praised the book noting that on the basis of this entry Bond is likely to live forever. "In true comic-book fashion, the gory chapters detail the horrors that kill almost everyone except Bond who obviously won't die until he wants to."

Kirkus Reviews called this the "most deft" of Gardner's Bond novels thus far, though felt that it did not measure up to Gardner's own 1985 straight spy novel The Secret Generations. The anonymous reviewer praised the "fairly inspired" plot gimmick involving hunt for Bond's own head. "Gardner weaves swift, outrageous coincidences into a preposterous plot that is quite fun to follow as it hops from the Tyrolean Alps to Salzburg to Key West. All in all, Gardner avoids some of the giganticism of the Bond flicks but certain climactic cliches – granted Bond's megalomaniacal villains – by now seem unavoidable, Even so, one dismisses the cliches for the amusement."

Frank Stilley, in a review for the Associated Press syndicated throughout the United States, said Gardner "lacks nothing" of Ian Fleming's gift for "conveying agaonizing suspense" and that "the yarn is a cinch" to please "James Bond's countless fans".

Don O'Briant, books editor for The Atlanta Journal and The Atlanta Constitution, said the book was an "exciting adventure" and noted it in his roundup of the year's best books.

Future Bond author Raymond Benson said "This is far and away John Gardner's best James Bond novel, and it is precisely because it is such a personal plot for the leading character. It's a plot reminiscent of From Russia, With Love, and it moves along excitingly! The chase idea was splendid indeed, and the reader is chased along with Bond throughout the book." Benson praised the story's "many surprising turns" and believed that if it were a film it would "have much of the same tension that something like Hitchcock's North by Northwest had." Benson's only complaint was the lack of a central villain, though he praised the "well-written female characters (Sukie Tempesta and Nannie Norrich)" who accompany Bond.

== See also ==
- Outline of James Bond
