= Icebreaker (novel) =

Novel by John Gardner

- First edition cover
- Author: John Gardner
- Cover artist: Bill Botten (Jonathan Cape ed.)
- Language: English
- Series: James Bond
- Genre: Spy fiction
- Publisher: Jonathan Cape
- Publication date: 7 July 1983
- Publication place: United Kingdom
- Media type: Print (Hardcover and Paperback)
- Pages: 256 pp (first edition, hardback)
- ISBN: 0-224-02949-5 (first edition, hardback)
- OCLC: 10349437
- LC Class: PR6057.A63 I2x 1983b

Icebreaker, first published in 1983, was the third novel by John Gardner featuring Ian Fleming's secret agent, James Bond. Carrying the Glidrose Publications copyright, it was first published in the United Kingdom by Jonathan Cape (cover design by Bill Botten) and is the first James Bond novel to be published in the United States by Putnam, beginning a long-standing association. Part of the book takes place in Northern Europe, including Finland; to make his book as authentic as possible, Gardner even visited Finland.

== Plot summary ==
James Bond reluctantly finds himself recruited into a dangerous mission involving an equally dangerous and treacherous alliance of agents from the United States (CIA), the Soviet Union (KGB) and Israel (Mossad). The team, dubbed "Icebreaker", waste no time double-crossing each other. Ostensibly their job is to root out the leader of the murderous National Socialist Action Army (NSAA), Count Konrad von Glöda. Count von Glöda, who leads this secret neo-Nazi organisation in northern Finland at its secret headquarters known as the "Ice Palace", used to be known as Arne Tudeer, a one-time Nazi SS officer who now perceives himself as the new Adolf Hitler. The National Socialist Action Army is essentially a new wave of fascism as a means to wipe out communist leaders and supporters around the world.

The novel is full of double-crosses and even triple-crosses, where the agents and agencies go without sharing their true loyalties with one another. Brad Tirpitz, the American agent, for instance, first appears to be a good guy then later is in cahoots with Glöda, and then still even later is a good guy once again. Things become even more complicated when the Israeli agent, Rivke Ingber, is revealed to be Anni Tudeer, the daughter of Glöda/Tudeer and her allegiance, although appearing to be legitimate, is doubtful. Kolya Mosolov, the Russian agent also double-crosses Bond in the hope of capturing him for KGB interrogation.

Bond gets several weeks of driving training from Erik Carlsson as preparation for this Arctic assignment.

== Characters ==
- James Bond
- M
- Paula Vacker: is a frequent love interest of James Bond that he visits while he is in Helsinki. During the course of the novel, her loyalty to him is questioned, initially appearing totally innocent, then in league with von Glöda, and finally discovered to be a deep under cover agent for Supo.
- Brad Tirpitz: is a member of the Icebreaker team and an agent from the CIA. He is later discovered by Bond to be in league with the National Socialist Action Army and to have killed the real agent Tirpitz and taken his place; he claims his name is actually Hans Buchtman and is described as von Glöda's Heinrich Himmler. Buchtman, however, turns out to be an alias of Brad Tirpitz, who created this back-story as a way to gain entry into von Glöda's organisation; indeed, he actually works for and is loyal to the CIA.
- Kolya Mosolov: is a KGB agent who is a member of the Icebreaker team. He is discovered to have planned the entire Icebreaker team in coordination with von Glöda. The two have a deal in which Mosolov would betray his country and sell arms to von Glöda in exchange for the capture of secret agent 007. Mosolov is not only an agent of the KGB, but also an agent working within "Department V", a department formerly known as SMERSH; Bond's main nemesis throughout the Ian Fleming novels. Mosolov believes that von Glöda will not succeed and is merely going along with the deal for the time being in order to capture Bond for the Soviets.
- Rivke Ingber: is a member of the Icebreaker team and an agent working for the Mossad. She is discovered to actually be Anni Tudeer, the daughter of Count von Glöda (aka Aarne Tudeer). Rivke plays both sides, initially acting like she is disgusted with her father's past, but later actually being discovered to be in league with him, thinking of herself as a future Führer.
- Count Konrad von Glöda: is the mastermind behind the National Socialist Action Army and self-declared Führer. His real name is Aarne Tudeer, a low-level SS officer wanted by the Allies for crimes during the Second World War. He attempts to bring back fascism by targeting communist leaders and supporters around the world.

== Publication history ==
Gardner reveals that his publisher originally rejected the title Icebreaker, only to come back to it after rejecting "turkey after turkey" in terms of alternate titles.

Icebreaker was released in Finland under a title Tehtävä Suomessa, James Bond (Mission in Finland, James Bond), as part of the book takes place in Finland.

- UK first hardback edition: 7 July 1983 Jonathan Cape
- U.S. first hardback edition: April 1983 Putnam
- UK first paperback edition: 1984 Coronet Books
- U.S. first paperback edition: May 1984 Berkley Books

== Reviews ==
The New York Times critic Anatole Broyard believed that John Gardner was underqualified to write Bond. "His book strikes me as deficient in many of the basic requirements. Mr. Gardner is all awkwardness. Every time I try to enter into his latest conspiracy we bump heads. It's one thing to accept an improbable plot and quite another to accept an improbable style. I'm willing to suspend my disbelief, but not my affection for the English language. I don't see why, when Mr. Gardner can learn all about the various weapons, machines and intelligence procedures he describes, he can't do a bit of basic research in ordinary narrative technique. A man who has no talent for describing women, for example, should let them alone." Broyard cited numerous examples of clichéd writing and dismissed the plot as "a muddle".

T. J. Binyon, writing in The Times Literary Supplement, believed the book was "full of good action; his torture scenes are splendidly painful; his villain is adequately megalomaniac, though perhaps not sufficiently outre; his girls are pretty, sexy, and available, and the courting routines as embarrassingly obvious as anything in the original. But in the end Gardner's Bond doesn't really measure up to Fleming's. There isn't that maniacal snobbery about trivial and useless detail which the original so endearingly manifests. And, further, Gardner simply hasn't grasped Bond's most important trait: he only takes assignments where his creator would like to take a holiday. And who on earth would want to holiday in the 'desolate Arctic wastes of Lapland'? Certainly not the luxurious Bond."

People Magazine's anonymous reviewer said that "the action in Icebreaker is fitful at best" and that the book was "not at all up to Gardner's (first) 007 outing, Licence Renewed. The Russian villain, however, is an original and sometimes interesting menace."

The Globe and Mail crime critic Derrick Murdoch believed Icebreaker was Gardner's best Bond novel thus far. "In most technical respects (writing, plotting and minor-character sketching), he is more skilful and more painstaking than Fleming even attempted to be. On the other hand, nobody since the Grimm brothers could equal Fleming's gift for improvising such audaciously grotesque adversaries as Dr. No, Blofeld, Auric Goldfinger and his henchman, Oddjob. To make up for the lack of gnomes or behemoths, Gardner offers a plot of labyrinthine complexity, subtler than any of Fleming's. In short, he has taken more risks in Icebreaker to display his own talents, and it has paid off.".

Mel Watkins, writing in The New York Times Book Review, praised Gardner for adding "a touch of the plot subtlety of less insistently action-oriented thrillers." He also applauded Gardner's updating of Bond. "Although Mr. Gardner's Bond is less raffishly macho and arrogant than previously depicted," observed Watkins, "the spirit of the 007 series remains intact, and few Fleming admirers are likely to object. There is, in fact, something appealing about a James Bond who can react to women with some sympathy and confusion at a crucial moment."

Long-time Gardner admirer and The Listener crime critic Marghanita Laski believed Icebreaker "is one of his best yet in his 007 mode." She especially admired the book's Finnish setting which she said "has been good thriller value since Gavin Lyall introduced it."

== See also ==
- Outline of James Bond
