= The Spy Who Loved Me =

The Spy Who Loved Me may refer to:

- The Spy Who Loved Me (novel), the 1962 novel by Ian Fleming
- The Spy Who Loved Me (film), the 1977 film named after the novel
  - James Bond, the Spy Who Loved Me, the novelization of the film by Christopher Wood
  - The Spy Who Loved Me (video game), the computer game based on the film
  - The Spy Who Loved Me (soundtrack), the soundtrack to the film composed by Marvin Hamlisch
