= For Special Services =

Novel by John Gardner (British writer)

- First edition cover
- Author: John Gardner
- Cover artist: Bill Botten (Jonathan Cape ed.)
- Language: English
- Series: James Bond
- Genre: Spy fiction
- Publisher: Jonathan Cape
- Publication date: September 1982
- Publication place: United Kingdom
- Media type: Print (Hardcover and Paperback)
- Pages: 256 pp (first edition, hardback)
- ISBN: 0-224-02934-7 (first edition, hardback)
- OCLC: 8852827

For Special Services, first published in 1982, was the second novel by John Gardner featuring Ian Fleming's secret agent, James Bond. Carrying the Glidrose Publications copyright, it was first published in the United Kingdom by Jonathan Cape and in the United States by Coward, McCann & Geoghegan. Cover designed by Bill Botten.

== For Special Services ==
In June 1941 General William Donovan was appointed by Franklin D. Roosevelt to the position of Coordinator of Information (COI), a position that later transformed into the chairmanship of the Office of Strategic Services (OSS). Upon request by Donovan, Ian Fleming was contacted to write a lengthy memorandum describing the structure and functions of a secret service organisation. Parts of this memorandum were later used in the official charter for the OSS, which was later dissolved after World War II in 1945. For appreciation of Fleming's work Donovan presented Fleming with a .38 Police Positive Colt revolver with the inscription, "For Special Services."

In 1944, Donovan proposed to President Roosevelt the creation of a new agency, "which will procure intelligence both by overt and covert methods and will at the same time provide intelligence guidance, determine national intelligence objectives, and correlate the intelligence material collected by all government agencies." The OSS was disbanded in 1945; accordingly, the Central Intelligence Agency; formed in 1947 is a direct descendant of the OSS.

== Plot summary ==
James Bond teams up with CIA agent Cedar Leiter, daughter of his old friend, Felix Leiter, to investigate one Markus Bismaquer, an ice cream tycoon who is suspected of reviving the criminal organisation SPECTRE, which was believed to have been disbanded years earlier following the death of its leader, Ernst Stavro Blofeld, at the hands of Bond (in You Only Live Twice).

The British Secret Service learns that Bismaquer is an obsessive collector of rare prints, so Bond and Cedar visit the man's huge ranch in Amarillo, Texas posing as art dealers. Their true identities are soon revealed, but not until Bond holds his own both in an impromptu (and fixed) car race arranged by Bismaquer, and in the bed of Bismaquer's frustrated wife, Nena. Nena, who has only one breast, quickly wins Bond's heart and his sympathy and Bond is convinced that Bismaquer is the one now being referred to as the new Blofeld.

Bond discovers that the revitalised SPECTRE plans to take over control of NORAD headquarters in order to gain control of America's military space satellite network. NORAD personnel are supplied with ice cream contaminated with a mild narcotic which makes consumers susceptible to following orders without question. His true identity revealed, Bond is captured and brainwashed into believing he is an American general. Bond is directed to inspect NORAD and obtain from the drug-affected military personnel computer tapes relating to the satellite system. Bond was set up to be killed in the ensuing attack by SPECTRE forces on the base; however, Bismaquer, who is bisexual and had taken a liking to Bond, gave him an antidote to bring him out the hypnosis.

Via helicopter, Nena takes Bond from NORAD to a SPECTRE house in Louisiana. Bond witnesses Bismaquer shot and killed by Nena, who is in fact, Nena Blofeld, the daughter of Ernst Stavro Blofeld, a fact she confesses to Bond. Just before firing at Bond, he throws a chair at Nena, which thrusts her through a window, falling into the crushing grip of her pet pythons. She is put out of her misery by Felix Leiter, who arrives on the scene after Cedar informed her superiors.

== Characters ==
- James Bond
- M
- Ann Reilly
- Cedar Leiter
- Felix Leiter
- Markus Bismaquer: Bismaquer, married to Nena Bismaquer, is a collector of fine prints and the owner of an ice cream plant in Amarillo, Texas. He is believed to be either a direct descendant or a confidant of Ernst Stavro Blofeld and to have resurrected the evil organization SPECTRE. John Gardner alludes, on more than one occasion, that Bismaquer in truth is a homosexual and possibly had fallen for Bond.
- Walter Luxor: Bismaquer's partner and a high-ranking member of SPECTRE. At one point he is believed to be a revived Ernst Stavro Blofeld.
- Mike Mazzard: a member of SPECTRE tasked to bring Bond to Amarillo. After Bond objects this offer, Mazzard attempts to kill Bond in Washington, D.C. Mazzard also aids Luxor in infiltrating NORAD HQ.
- Nena Bismaquer: the wife of Markus Bismaquer. She later turns out to be the daughter of Ernst Stavro Blofeld and the successor and leader of SPECTRE.

== Car ==
This is the second novel in Gardner's Bond series in which Bond drives a Saab 900 Turbo; however, this is the first book in which the car's colour is mentioned and it is referred to by its more popular nickname, the Silver Beast.

== Publication history ==
- UK first hardback edition: September 1982 Jonathan Cape
- U.S. first hardback edition: April 1982 Coward, McCann & Geoghegan
- UK first paperback edition: 1982 Coronet Books
- U.S. first paperback edition: April 1983 Berkley Books

The U.S. hardcover had a first printing of 95,000 copies.

== Reviews ==
Kingsley Amis, himself a former Bond author, was the harshest. His Times Literary Supplement review called the book "an unrelieved disaster", Gardner "not the most self-assured of writers", and said that the plot was "absurd" and "blundering". Amis said, "What makes Mr Gardner's book so hard to read is not so much its endlessly silly story as its desolateness, its lack of the slightest human interest or warmth. [...] But then to do anything like that the writer must be genuinely interested in his material."

Writing in The New Republic, Robin W. Winks wrote, "Bond is dead, and John Gardner's second effort to remove the nails from that coffin, though not so dreary nor so silly as the first, is nonetheless very thin gruel." Winks further said the book was "exceptionally bad when read back-to-back with Ian Fleming's From a View to a Kill. The book is full of one sentence paragraphs — did Fleming ever really write this way? — and obligatory "who'll sleep in the one bedroom, who on the couch" scenes once calculated to titillate fourteen-year-olds."

New Statesman critic Lewis Jones dismissed it as "a real airport novel, unimaginative and badly written. Bond is as dated as Biggles. Gardner's attempts to update meet with partial success. He can manage the machines but not the people." Jones summed the book up in one word: "Deadly."

Novelist Stanley Ellin, reviewing for The New York Times, asserted that the novel "was a dud, and for reasons having nothing to do with the author's well-proven talent. Ian Fleming was a dreadful writer, a creator of books for grown-up boys, a practitioner of tin-eared prose...John Gardner, creator of the inimitable and delightful Boysie Oakes among other characters, is the antithesis to all this, a writer of style and wit with a sharp-eyed, acidulous and yet appreciative view of humanity and its foibles. Fleming's shoes are simply too tight and misshapen for Mr. Gardner to wear comfortably. Fleming, however, did offer the reader one thing no imitator can possibly duplicate: total identification with and commitment to his hero and his works as the products of an uninhibited wish fulfillment." However, Ellin did find several things to admire: "There are some good things among the zany proceedings: an automobile road race described to nerveracking effect; the amusing relationship between the aging Bond and the youthful Cedar Leiter; a climax where Bond is drugged into imagining he is the woolly-headed Gen. James A. Banker, U.S.A. - all pure John Gardner at his Boysie Oakes best. This still doesn't compensate for the awkwardness of the whole project. The reader will do better to head for anything by Mr. Gardner that isn't imitation Fleming. As pure Gardner, he is quite a writer."

Mystery novelist Reginald Hill, writing in Books and Bookmen, admitted "I was not pre-inclined to like John Gardner's second James Bond adventure For Special Services, and I didn't. Mr. Gardner is far too good a writer not to make a fair stab at the job. No mere arranger of other men's flowers, he is of course a thriller writer of the first water. All this is done with technical skill and some panache, but in the end Bond belongs so much to the 50s and early 60s that to translate him to the 80s without making him grow up is an almost impossible task. The result is very fair escapist stuff, but time and again I found myself asking the, I hope, not impertinent question, if this man wasn't called James Bond, how good a thriller would this be? And the answer, I'm afraid, is not half as good as what Mr Gardner is capable of giving us when he follows his own creative bent. Bring back Boysie Oakes!"

People magazine complained that the novel "has the stripped-down feeling of a comic strip. Fleming had fun with James Bond, but he also seemed genuinely to admire 007's ridiculous, perfect-martini mannerisms. Gardner, while he's a better writer than Fleming, is a cynical pro. There is no joy in his Bond."

A handful of critics liked the book despite some reservations. The Globe and Mail crime critic Derrick Murdoch praised Gardner's vast research "on the state-of-the-art technology affecting satellite chasers, hydraulics, automobile and monorail engineering design, weaponry, optics and pyrostatics." Murdoch also praised the novel's final scene set "in a mock-decrepit palace in the middle of the Louisiana swampland, is played out in maniacal fury, total illogic and superb idiocy to enchant the mind. In other words, John Gardner is having more fun with his rented character than he allowed himself to have in the earlier book."

Kirkus Reviews said Gardner's second Bond novel "is smooth enough - but a good deal less fun than License Renewed. Comic-strippy as ever, but without the freshness and Bond-persona detail of the first resurrection."

John Waite, writing in the Nursing Mirror, said Gardner managed to write in Fleming's style "beautifully". The plot, he said, was preposterous enough, the girls exotic enough and the villains superbly Satanic.

== See also ==
- Outline of James Bond
