= Nobody Lives Forever =

Nobody Lives Forever may refer to:

- Nobody Lives for Ever, a James Bond novel, released as Nobody Lives Forever in the U.S.
- Nobody Lives Forever (film), a 1946 film starring John Garfield
- Nobody Lives Forever, a 1998 television film starring Brenda Bakke
- "Nobody Lives Forever", an episode of Miami Vice season 1
- "Nobody Lives Forever", an episode of Elementary

== See also ==
- The Operative: No One Lives Forever, a 2000 video game
- "No One Lives Forever", a song by Oingo Boingo from the 1985 album Dead Man's Party
