= The Man from Barbarossa =

Novel by John Gardner (British writer)

- Hodder & Stoughton British hardcover edition.
- Author: John Gardner
- Language: English
- Series: James Bond
- Genre: Spy fiction
- Publisher: Hodder & Stoughton
- Publication date: 1991
- Publication place: United Kingdom
- Media type: Print (Hardcover and Paperback)
- ISBN: 0-340-53124-X
- OCLC: 56651059

The Man from Barbarossa, first published in 1991, was the eleventh novel by John Gardner featuring Ian Fleming's secret agent, James Bond. Carrying the Glidrose Publications copyright, it was first published in the United Kingdom by Hodder & Stoughton and in the United States by Putnam.

More so than any previous Bond novel, The Man from Barbarossa acknowledges then-current world events. The story begins in January 1991 just prior to the end of the Persian Gulf War, and later includes a description of the early stage of the war against Iraq. Gardner also predicted that hardliners within the Soviet Union might attempt a coup against the government, which did occur later in 1991 but under different circumstances. The book also strongly suggests that the Cold War was soon to end, which did occur that year in December.

John Gardner has stated on many occasions that of the 007 novels he wrote, this is his favourite because it was different and had a more creative approach than all his previous attempts. Additionally, Gardner believes that of all his novels, this was Glidrose's favourite as well, although the American publishers took a strong dislike to it. Critics were mixed, with many feeling it was one of Gardner's lesser Bond novels.

== Plot summary ==
The Man from Barbarossa begins with a prelude that includes some background information on the Nazi invasion of the Soviet Union codenamed Operation Barbarossa, the massacre at Babi Yar that occurred not long after, and information on Josif Voronstov, a fictional character said to be a deputy of real-life Paul Blobel who was primarily responsible for the massacre.

When the story begins, an elderly American living in New Jersey is kidnapped by a Russian terrorist group called the "Scales of Justice". The man, Joel Penderek, was captured under the belief that he is Josif Voronstov, the war criminal partially responsible for the massacre at Babi Yar.

M is informed by Boris Stepakov of the possibility of infiltrating two Britons into the Scales of Justice. He decides to rely on James Bond and an anomalous collaboration with the Mossad. The Israeli secret service sends Pete Natkowitz to London. Natkowitz brings information that they can prove that Vorontsov and Penderek are in fact two different men and that the Scales of Justice have kidnapped the wrong person and that Mossad has Vorontsov under coverage.

The two secret agents investigate the activities of Stéphanie Adoré and Henri Rampart, two French agents who, during the London night, met with two KGB-connected individuals without authorization. The next day James Bond and Pete Natkowitz leave for Moscow where they are greeted by Boris Stepakov.

They discover that the two French agents have kidnapped the real Joseph Vorontsov and handed him over to the Russians who are holding him at a dacha on the Black Sea. Meanwhile, the Scales of Justice have begun assassinating members of the Soviet government.

Through Professor Vladimir Lyko, an English professor who has been converted into a double agent for the terrorist group, they discover that the organization has decided to carry out a mock trial and film it. Their only chance is to send Bond and Natkowitz to the Soviet Union as replacements for a British film crew that Scales of Justice has sent for.

Stepakov has decided to infiltrate 007 and Natkowitz as operators, together with his agent Nina Bibikova who will pose as Bond's wife. The girl knows English well and is the daughter of Michael Brooks and Emerald Lacy, British agents infiltrated into the KGB, who died in a car accident a few years earlier.

The three are thus delivered by the professor to the Scales of Justice and taken to an isolated convent near the border with Finland. Lyko is murdered immediately afterwards.

There they are assigned to film a trial against Vorontsov (played by Penderek, who turns out to be a Russian agent), with a whole host of Jewish witnesses. While Bond is busy filming the mock trial (and flirting with Nina), Stepakov is harshly reprimanded by the President of the Soviet Union for the surmounting political assassinations. But the man explains to his interlocutor that he has infiltrated some men and knows where they are. The President authorizes an operation and entrusts it to a Spetsnaz team led by General Gleb Berzin.

Bond discovers that two actors in the process are Michael Brooks and Emerald Lacy the parents of Nina, who were not dead as previously thought. The two say they have infiltrated the terrorist organization and have a plan, but the Bond has doubts. Meanwhile, an important politician of the Soviet Union enters the trial: General Yevgeny Yuskovich, commander in chief of the missile forces. Yuskovich plays the judge at the trial.

Berzin's Spetsnaz arrive at convenient time, accompanied by Stepakov and the two French agents. However, its a ploy, as General Berzin and his Spetsnaz are on Yuskovich's side, which explains the miraculous assassinations on Soviet politicians. Yuskovich tells that the Scales of Justice was originally a small organization that Yuskovich took the name from to spread misinformation and fear.

The Scales of Justice imprison Stepakov, Adorè, Rampart, the spouses Brooks and Natkowitz. Nina turns out to be Yuskovich's lover. One of the Spetsnaz reports that they have found Bond dead, with his face disfigured by a stray gunshot.

After filming, the group moves to Baku where Yuskovich has sold a military arsenal to Iran. The general's aim is to exploit the probable war between the United States and Iraq to make Iran hit Washington with a nuclear bomb. By distributing photos of Western agents handing over weapons and explaining to the world how he ended a tragic chapter of history with the mock trial, which would open the way for him to take over the Russian presidency and end perestroika and glasnost.

Weapon boats leave from the port of Baku. On the main boat is the soldier who had found Bond's body. But in reality he is 007 himself. He frees his companions and collects weapons. Stepakov dives into the water and manages to sink two ships loaded with explosives before being killed. Rampart is also murdered as he lowers himself into a lifeboat. Bond, Natkowitz and Adorè are about to be hit on their lifeboat when Soviet planes arrive, signaled by a message from 007, which bomb the boats.

Back in London, Bond debriefs M. The United States launches Operation Desert Storm and 007 places a box attributed to him on M's desk, which contains the Order of Lenin.

== Characters ==
- James Bond
- M
- Bill Tanner
- Miss Moneypenny
- Josif Voronstov: Deputy to Paul Blobel, the instigator of the massacre at Babi Yar. Said to have driven the victims to their deaths. Is actually Joel Penderek who is captured in Hawthorne, New Jersey by the Scales of Justice. Voronstov is put on a mock trial where it is discovered he is the cousin of General Yevgeny Yuskovich.
- General Yevgeny Yuskovich: Yuskovich is the leader of the Scales of Justice and the primary villain of the novel. He attempts to sabotage perestroika and supply Iraq with nuclear arms.

== Publication history ==
- UK first hardback edition: August 1991 Hodder & Stoughton
- U.S. first hardback edition: May 1991 Putnam
- UK first paperback edition: 1991 Coronet Books
- U.S. first paperback edition: January 1992 Berkley Books

== See also ==
- Outline of James Bond
