= Scorpius (novel) =

Novel by John Gardner (British writer)

- First edition
- Author: John Gardner
- Language: English
- Series: James Bond
- Genre: Spy fiction
- Publisher: Hodder & Stoughton
- Publication date: 1 June 1988
- Publication place: United Kingdom
- Media type: Print (Hardcover and Paperback)
- Pages: 224 pp
- ISBN: 0-340-41523-1
- OCLC: 17439410

Scorpius, first published in 1988, is the seventh novel by John Gardner featuring Ian Fleming's secret agent, James Bond. Carrying the Glidrose Publications copyright, it was first published in the United Kingdom by Hodder & Stoughton (the first original James Bond novel not to be published by Jonathan Cape) and in the United States by Putnam.

== Plot summary ==
After being connected to the death of a woman named Emma Dupré in London, James Bond is called in by M to aid the investigation. Returning from Hereford, Special Air Service Sergeant Pearlman tags along by driving Bond back, during which they are attacked and involved in a high-speed chase on an English motorway. Upon safely returning to headquarters, Bond is briefed on the investigation by M and Chief Superintendent Bailey. Emma, whom Bond does not know, was found dead with Bond's telephone number. She is a member of a cult society known as "The Meek Ones", operated by a Father Valentine. With additional information from the CIA, the British Secret Service learn that Valentine is an alias for Vladimir Scorpius, an arms dealer for several terrorist organisations.

As the country's general election approaches, by the use of brainwashed cult members, Scorpius has begun a "holy war" against every man, woman, and child. The cult members, thinking themselves to be pure, moral, and unsullied, sacrifice their lives for "the greater good of humanity", believing that by performing this "death task" they will achieve paradise. Throughout the novel, The Meek Ones commit several acts of terrorism, including bombings and assassinations of British politicians.

Throughout the horror, Bond meets Harriett Horner, an IRS agent working undercover in England and investigating a credit card company run by Scorpius. The two work together along with Pearlman to attempt to track down Scorpius. After an interrogation of a captured cult member, Horner is taken captive by Scorpius' men. Additionally, Pearlman confesses to Bond that he was secretly giving Scorpius information for the benefit of his daughter Ruth who had been brainwashed. Together the two set out for Scorpius' base of operations in South Carolina, having Scorpius believe Pearlman was taking Bond captive.

At Scorpius' island, Bond meets up with Horner once again and the two actually marry at the behest of Scorpius. Knowing that the marriage is invalid, Bond agrees to go ahead with it thinking it would buy him time until he can escape. On the night the two decide to escape, Horner is killed by a water moccasin. At the same time the FBI is conducting a raid of Scorpius' island, which further angers Bond since her death was in vain. Bond returns to the island, finding Scorpius attempting to flee. After giving chase, Bond successfully gets the upper hand and forces Scorpius to die in a similar manner to that of Horner.

== Characters in "Scorpius" ==
- James Bond
- M
- Bill Tanner
- Miss Moneypenny
- Harriett Horner: An IRS agent secretly working in England undercover, she is found by Bond and later captured by Scorpius. At Scorpius' base, Bond and Horner pretend to marry, only for her to die a couple days later when attempting to flee Scorpius' island.
- Sergeant Pearlman: Pearlman first meets Bond to deliver a message that he is requested by M. Pearlman drives Bond back and in doing so earns Bond's trust. Bond later learns, however, that Pearlman was secretly feeding Scorpius information because his daughter Ruth was brainwashed and a member of The Meek Ones. He confesses this much to Bond and requests help in getting Ruth free from the society. Unfortunately for Pearlman, when the opportunity arises, Ruth is sent on a "death task" to kill both the President of the United States and the British prime minister. She is unsuccessful and subsequently killed by Bond before she can detonate her explosives.
- Chief Superintendent Bailey: Bailey is sent by Special Branch to aid in the investigation of the terrorist activities in England. From the beginning he is aiding Scorpius by giving him information that allow Scorpius to be always one step ahead of everyone. Bailey is shot and killed by Bond at the White House after attempting to witness the assassinations of both the President of the United States and the British prime minister.
- Vladimir Scorpius: Scorpius, also known as Father Valentine, is an arms dealer and the creator of the cult society, "The Meek Ones." By numerous sources he is considered to be Satan incarnate. After the death of Bond's "unofficial" wife, Bond returns to Scorpius' island and kills him in the same manner in which she died, although after forcing him outside and wounding him several times.

== Reception ==
- The Schenectady Gazette stated "Gardner has masterfully brought Bond into the modern era and done a credible job of recreating a legend."

== Publication history ==
- UK first hardback edition: June 1988 Hodder & Stoughton
- U.S. first hardback edition: May 1988 Putnam
- UK first paperback edition: March 1989 Coronet Books
- U.S. first paperback edition: January 1990 Charter Books

== See also ==
- Outline of James Bond
