= The Living Daylights (video game) =

1987 video game

- Publisher: Domark
- Designer: Richard Naylor
- Series: James Bond
- Platforms: Amstrad CPC, Amstrad PCW, Atari 8-bit, BBC Micro, Commodore 64, MSX, ZX Spectrum
- Release: 1987
- Genre: Run and gun
- Mode: Single-player

The Living Daylights is a run and gun video game adaptation of the 1987 James Bond film The Living Daylights. It was the second Bond game published by Domark following 1985's poorly received A View to a Kill: The Computer Game.

The game was released for all major platforms at the time and developed by De Re Software (Atari 8-bit), Exasoft (BBC Micro), Sculptured Software (Commodore 64) and Walking Circles (Amstrad CPC/PCW, MSX, ZX Spectrum) from a design by Richard Naylor of Domark.

== Legacy ==
The game was re-released as a light gun shooter on various cassette tapes with the ZX Spectrum 007 Action Pack. The plot was greatly rewritten, and explained on narration audiocassettes by Desmond Llewelyn as Q.

== See also ==
- Outline of James Bond
- James Bond in video games
