= Death Is Forever =

Novel by John Gardner (British writer)

- First edition
- Author: John Gardner
- Language: English
- Series: James Bond
- Genre: Spy fiction
- Publisher: Hodder & Stoughton
- Publication date: 1992
- Publication place: United Kingdom
- Media type: Print (Hardcover and Paperback)
- Pages: 224 pp (first edition, hardback)
- ISBN: 0-340-54816-9 (first edition, hardback)
- OCLC: 26721121

Death Is Forever, first published in 1992, was the twelfth novel by John Gardner to feature Ian Fleming's secret agent, James Bond (including Gardner's novelization of Licence to Kill). Carrying the Glidrose Publications copyright, it was first published in the United Kingdom by Hodder & Stoughton and in the United States by Putnam.

Death Is Forever is significant as the first James Bond novel to be published after the collapse of the Soviet Union and the end of the Cold War, two elements that were part and parcel of Bond's creation 40 years earlier.

More than most other Gardner novels, Death Is Forever is grounded in contemporary events, with the fallout from the end of the Cold War and the failed 1991 Russian coup being important backdrops to the story. The Eurotunnel connecting England and France, which was still under construction at the time the book was written, also serves as a major setting.

== Plot summary ==
In Frankfurt, a veteran spy known by the codename Vanya is killed, followed a week later by another spy, codenamed Eagle, in Berlin. Both deaths are reminiscent of old-time assassinations. Both were also part of a now-defunct spy network known as the Cabal. Bond, along with American desk agent Elizabeth Zara St. John and Bill Tanner, investigates Vanya's and Eagle's final days to understand how they were tracked down.

To find out if any of the remaining members of the Cabal are traitors, Bond and Easy must take on the roles of Vanya and Eagle and travel to Berlin. In the shadows, villain Wolfgang Wiesen plans reintroducing Josef Stalin's type of communism.

Bond soon discovers he is being followed, but is interrupted when Easy is caught off guard by one of the few remaining Cabal members, Oscar Vomburg. They manage to convince him that they are harmless and that he needs to put them in touch with Praxi Simeon, who was the Cabal's coordinator. While Vomburg tries to get hold of Simeon, Bond and Easy manage to avoid food that is full of "fiddleback" spiders.

Soon after, Vomburg is found dead, and the next Cabal member, Harry Spraker, makes contact. They ride the Ost-West Express train towards Paris. After successfully breaking free from two of Wiesen's men on the train, Bond decides he doesn't trust Spraker and they split up at the Paris station. Bond shadows Spraker and sees him meeting an unknown man, but is captured by two French agents, who do not want foreign agents on their soil. He is released on condition that he leaves the country and goes straight to Simeon, where the real Spraker is also found.

Simeon, Spraker and a third Cabal member, Bruin, know that one of Wiesen's bases is in Venice, and that he has sworn revenge on the Cabal. They head there, separately. Bond then meets another Cabal member, Gus Wimper, with whom he forms a temporary alliance when Easy, Simeon, Spraker and Bruin are captured by Wiesen's men. Bond and Wimper try to free the four, but are captured themselves, whereupon Bond is taken to Wiesen and interrogated.

Afterwards, he is taken to a cell in the basement, where the entire gang is to be killed before Wiesen and his men depart and carry out their grand plan. Bond manages to free them and capture Wiesen, though not without Easy being killed. They take Wiesen towards Calais, where his plan is to take place, but additional henchmen attack them and carry off the sedated Wiesen, with only Bond and Simeon surviving.

Bond realizes that the plan involves the not-yet-completed Channel Tunnel between France and Great Britain, where the EU's twelve prime ministers will meet at the premiere of the Eurostar. With the help of French GIGN soldiers, Bond succeeds in preventing the plan to blow up the train and kill the dignitaries, preventing a political vacuum.

Once home, Bond is attacked by Wiesen's wife, but manages to escape after an even knife fight.

== Critical reception ==
According to Kirkus Reviews, "Gardner's fans won't be disappointed".

== Publication history ==
- UK first hardback edition: July 1992 Hodder & Stoughton
- U.S. first hardback edition: June 1992 Putnam
- UK first paperback edition: July 1993 Coronet Books
- U.S. first paperback edition: August 1993 Berkley Books

== See also ==
- Outline of James Bond
