= Ian Fleming Publications =

Production company

Ian Fleming Publications Limited (formerly known as Glidrose Productions Limited, from 1972 to 1998, and Ian Fleming (Glidrose) Publications Limited, from 1998 to 2002, named after its founders John Gliddon and Norman Rose) is a production company. In 1952, author Ian Fleming bought it after completing his first James Bond novel, Casino Royale; he assigned most of his rights in Casino Royale, and the works which followed it to Glidrose.

In 1956, Ian Fleming hired literary agent Peter Janson-Smith to handle the foreign translation rights in the James Bond novels. He was the literary consultant and chairman of Ian Fleming Publications until 2001. Today, the Fleming family-owned Ian Fleming Publications administers all Fleming's literary works.

== Publication history ==
After Ian Fleming's death in 1964, the estate either commissioned or permitted new James Bond works to be published. In 1968, Kingsley Amis published Colonel Sun, under the pseudonym "Robert Markham". The company changed its name from Glidrose Productions to Glidrose Publications. In 1973, Glidrose sanctioned James Bond: The Authorized Biography of 007 by John Pearson. In 1977 and again in 1979, Eon Productions authorized Christopher Wood to write novelisations of his scripts for the Bond films The Spy Who Loved Me and Moonraker, which were released as James Bond, the Spy Who Loved Me and James Bond and Moonraker.

In 1981 the James Bond book series was revived, with new novels written by John Gardner. After writing 14 Bond books, John Gardner retired in 1996, and Raymond Benson, controversially at first, the first American to write a James Bond novel, replaced him. It was during Benson's six-book run that the company owning the rights to the Bond characters changed names from Glidrose Publications to Ian Fleming Publications; the publisher's new name appeared first in the 1999 book High Time to Kill. Benson stopped writing Bond books in 2002. On what would have been Fleming's 100th birthday—28 May 2008—the novel Devil May Care, appeared. Its author, Sebastian Faulks, was true to James Bond's original character and background and provided 'a Flemingesque hero' who drove a battleship grey 1967 T-series Bentley. Next, Ian Fleming Publications commissioned Jeffery Deaver to write Carte Blanche, which was published in May 2011. In April 2012, the company announced that William Boyd would write the next Bond novel and Jonathan Cape in the UK and HarperCollins in Canada and the US published Solo in 2013. Anthony Horowitz's Trigger Mortis appeared in September 2015.

Between 2005 and 2008, Ian Fleming Publications has supported the publication of Charlie Higson's five Young Bond novels telling the adventures of a teenage James Bond in the 1930s. In 2005 the company launched another series of Bond-related spin-off books, The Moneypenny Diaries by Samantha Weinberg, writing as "Kate Westbrook". Young Bond returned in 2013 with Shoot to Kill by Steve Cole.

In a controversial move in 2023, the James Bond novels were rewritten to remove references deemed offensive following a sensitivity review commissioned by the company. Some depictions of Black people were removed, while a reference to the "sweet tang of rape," a description of homosexuality as a "disability," and mockery of East Asian people were allowed to remain.

== James Bond books ==
=== by Ian Fleming ===
1. Casino Royale (1953) – first American paperback title: You Asked For It
2. Live and Let Die (1954)
3. Moonraker (1955) – first American paperback title: Too Hot to Handle
4. Diamonds Are Forever (1956)
5. From Russia, with Love (1957)
6. Dr. No (1958)
7. Goldfinger (1959)
8. For Your Eyes Only (1960)
9. Thunderball (1961) – "based on a screen treatment by Kevin McClory, Jack Whittingham and Ian Fleming"
10. The Spy Who Loved Me (1962)
11. On Her Majesty's Secret Service (1963)
12. You Only Live Twice (1964)
13. The Man with the Golden Gun (1965)
14. Octopussy and The Living Daylights (1966)

Short stories

Short story	Published date	Publication
"Quantum of Solace"	May 1959	Cosmopolitan
"The Hildebrand Rarity"	March 1960	Playboy
"For Your Eyes Only"	1960	
"From a View to a Kill"	1960	
"Risico"	1960	
"The Living Daylights"	9 February 1962	The Sunday Times
"The Property of a Lady"	1963	The Ivory Hammer
"007 in New York"	1963	Thrilling Cities
"Octopussy"	March/April 1966	Playboy

=== by Kingsley Amis ===
Written by Kingsley Amis under the pseudonym Robert Markham.

1. Colonel Sun (1968) – last book copyrighted under the Glidrose Productions name

=== by John Gardner ===
1. Licence Renewed (1981) – American title: License Renewed
2. For Special Services (1982)
3. Icebreaker (1983)
4. Role of Honour (1984) – American title: Role of Honor
5. Nobody Lives for Ever (1986) – American title: Nobody Lives Forever
6. No Deals, Mr. Bond (1987)
7. Scorpius (1988)
8. Win, Lose or Die (1989)
9. Brokenclaw (1990)
10. The Man from Barbarossa (1991)
11. Death Is Forever (1992)
12. Never Send Flowers (1993)
13. SeaFire (1994)
14. Cole (1996) – American title: Cold Fall

=== by Raymond Benson ===
1. Zero Minus Ten (1997)
2. The Facts of Death (1998) – last Bond novel copyrighted under the Glidrose Publications name
3. High Time to Kill (1999) – first Bond novel copyrighted by Ian Fleming Publications
4. DoubleShot (2000)
5. Never Dream of Dying (2001)
6. The Man with the Red Tattoo (2002)

Short stories

Short story	Published date	Publication
"Blast from the Past"	January 1997	Playboy
"Midsummer Night's Doom"	January 1999	Playboy
"Live at Five"	November 1999	TV Guide

=== by Sebastian Faulks ===
The novel by Sebastian Faulks is a one-off adult Bond novel that follows The Man with the Golden Gun in the 1960s. The book was written to celebrate Ian Fleming's centenary and was released on Fleming's birthday, 28 May 2008.

1. Devil May Care – May 2008

=== by Jeffery Deaver ===
The novel by Jeffery Deaver, Carte Blanche, previously known as Project X, is set in the present era and was published on 28 May 2011.

1. Carte Blanche – May 2011

=== by William Boyd ===
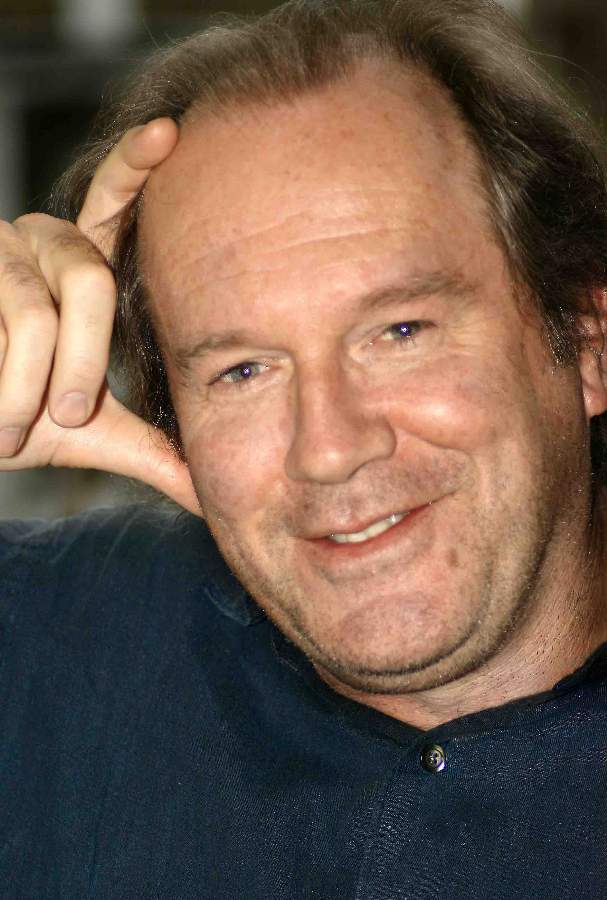
William Boyd, author of Solo.

On 11 April 2012 it was announced that William Boyd would write the next James Bond novel, entitled Solo, set at the end of the 1960s. The novel was released in the United Kingdom on 26 September 2013, and in the United States and Canada on 8 October 2013.

1. Solo – September 2013

=== by Anthony Horowitz ===
1. Trigger Mortis – September 2015
2. Forever and a Day – May 2018
3. With a Mind to Kill – May 2022

=== by Charlie Higson ===
1. On His Majesty's Secret Service – May 2023
2. King Zero – September 2026

=== by Dan Jones ===
1. All In – December 2026

=== Novelizations ===
- James Bond, the Spy Who Loved Me (1977) by Christopher Wood
- James Bond and Moonraker (1979) by Christopher Wood
- Licence to Kill (1989) by John Gardner
- GoldenEye (1995) by John Gardner
- Tomorrow Never Dies (1997) by Raymond Benson
- The World Is Not Enough (1999) by Raymond Benson
- Die Another Day (2002) by Raymond Benson

== James Bond spinoffs ==
=== James Bond, Jr. ===
Written by the pseudonymous R. D. Mascott, it was the first James Bond related book not written by Ian Fleming to be published after Fleming's death. To this day, Ian Fleming Publications has never disclosed or confirmed the author's identity.

1. The Adventures of James Bond Junior 003½ (1967)

=== The Authorized Biography ===
Written by Fleming's friend and colleague, John Pearson, the book differs from all other Bond novels in that it is a biography told in the first-person by Pearson upon meeting James Bond.

1. James Bond: The Authorized Biography of 007 (1973) – first book copyrighted under the Glidrose Publications name.

=== Young Bond ===
==== Charlie Higson ====
Charlie Higson's novels, part of a series called Young Bond, are prequels to Fleming's series.

1. SilverFin – March 2005
2. Blood Fever – January 2006
3. Double or Die – January 2007
4. Hurricane Gold – September 2007
5. By Royal Command – September 2008

Short story

James Bond uncollected short stories by Charlie Higson
Short story	Published date	Publication
"A Hard Man to Kill"	October 2009	Danger Society: The Young Bond Dossier

==== Steve Cole ====
In October 2013 Ian Fleming Publications announced that Steve Cole would continue the series, with his first book scheduled to be released in November 2014.

1. Shoot to Kill – November 2014
2. Heads You Die – May 2016
3. Strike Lightning – September 2016
4. Red Nemesis – May 2017

=== The Moneypenny Diaries ===
The Moneypenny Diaries is a trilogy chronicling the life of Miss Moneypenny. The books are written by Samantha Weinberg under the pseudonym Kate Westbrook.

1. The Moneypenny Diaries: Guardian Angel – October 2005
2. Secret Servant: The Moneypenny Diaries – November 2006
3. The Moneypenny Diaries: Final Fling – May 2008

The Moneypenny Diaries short stories by Samantha Weinberg
Short story	Published date	Publication
"For Your Eyes Only, James"	November 2006	Tatler
"Moneypenny’s First Date With Bond"	November 2006	The Spectator

=== Double O ===
==== Kim Sherwood ====
1. Double or Nothing (2023)
2. A Spy Like Me (2024)
3. Hurricane Room (2026)

=== Felix Leiter ===
==== Raymond Benson ====
1. The Hook and the Eye (2025)

=== The Q Mysteries ===
==== Vaseem Khan ====
1. Quantum of Menace (2025)
2. The Man with the Golden Compass (2026)

== Other published works ==
- The Diamond Smugglers (1957) – Ian Fleming
- Thrilling Cities (1963) – Ian Fleming
- Chitty-Chitty-Bang-Bang (1964) – Ian Fleming

=== Chitty Chitty Bang Bang sequel novels ===
Three novels were given approval by the Ian Fleming Estate

- Chitty Chitty Bang Bang Flies Again (October 2011) by Frank Cottrell Boyce
- Chitty Chitty Bang Bang and the Race Against Time (September 2012) by Frank Cottrell Boyce
- Chitty Chitty Bang Bang Over the Moon (September 2013) by Frank Cottrell Boyce

== Unpublished works ==
The following are stories known to have been written for Glidrose / Ian Fleming Publications, however, were not published.

- Per Fine Ounce – novel by Geoffrey Jenkins circa 1966.
- "The Heart of Erzulie" – short story by Raymond Benson circa 2001–2002.
