= Never Send Flowers =

Novel by John Gardner (British writer)

- First edition (UK)
- Author: John Gardner
- Language: English
- Series: James Bond
- Genre: Spy fiction
- Publisher: Hodder & Stoughton
- Publication date: 15 July 1993
- Publication place: United Kingdom
- Media type: Print (Hardcover and Paperback)
- Pages: 256 pp (first edition, hardback)
- ISBN: 0-399-13809-9 (first edition, hardback)
- OCLC: 27677599
- Dewey Decimal: 823/.914 20
- LC Class: PR6057.A63 N48 1993

Never Send Flowers, first published in 1993, was the thirteenth novel by John Gardner featuring Ian Fleming's secret agent, James Bond (including Gardner's novelization of Licence to Kill). Carrying the Glidrose Publications copyright, it was first published in the United Kingdom by Hodder & Stoughton and in the United States by Putnam.

== Plot summary ==
Four people, seemingly unrelated, are killed in different ways, by different killers. In Switzerland, a fifth person, MI5 agent Laura March, is murdered, again in a new way. Since the Swiss police do not want MI5 to investigate a case in which they may be involved, James Bond is assigned to follow the investigation.

He is met by the Swiss agent Fredericka "Flicka" von Grüsse. She tells him that March had gone to Switzerland to meet her brother David, which surprises Bond because March has no siblings. However, it turns out that March lied because her brother went crazy and murdered several people. He had died in prison, leaving Bond and Flicka still wondering who March had met the last few times in Switzerland.

Bond and Flicka investigate find a letter from March to David. They send a copy to London and while they wait they have sex. The next morning they discover that someone stole the letter. After informing his boss, Bond goes with Flicka to the mountain where March died and learns that the Swiss police discovered that the suspected killer arrived as one person and left as another, with a distinctive stick.

Before Bond and Flicka have time to act further, they learn that they have been disconnected from the case, due to the carelessness of the letter. Bond then takes a month off. He soon discovers that MI5 is shadowing him, and through a deception maneuver he manages to meet one of the MI5 agents he has come to trust.

She says that March's last boyfriend was David Dragonpol, the best British actor since Laurence Olivier, who recently retired for unknown reasons to his castle on the river Rhine. When Bond leaves for a meeting with Flicka, he becomes a suspect in the murder of the MI5 agent. Bond goes to the police who have been instructed by Bond's boss, M, to release him.

The next step is to go to March's funeral, where someone has sent a hybrid red and white rose, just like the one sent to the previous four murders. Bond decides to take Flicka to Dragonpole's castle. Once there, they meet Dragonpol and his sister, Maeve, who together turn out to be preparing a giant theater museum.

Flicka tells Bond about the Swiss police's suspicions of Dragonpol as a terrorist, but the final clue is Maeve Dragonpol's interest in hybrid roses. They escape through Dragonpol's theater museum and find plans indicating that there will be attacks in Milan, Athens and Paris: against Kiri Te Kanawa, Yassir Arafat and some they cannot identify. However, they lose track of Dragonpol who can be anywhere, with any appearance.

M gives Bond and Flicka the new mission to become sacrificial lambs for Dragonpol in Milan. After a short time he attacks - his twin brother, the real David Dragonpol. In interrogations with M and several others, the twin brother, Daniel Dragonpol, reveals that David was born deaf and mute and was therefore kept a secret by the family, but regained hearing and speech after an accident. He became obsessed with becoming the best actor, but had also started assassinating people. The murder of his brother was Daniel Dragonpol's way of escaping guilt.

Soon it turns out that it was only a ruse and that he fled, just like Maeve did. Bond figures out where Dragonpol is going, to Eurodisney, where he is going to kill Princess Diana and her two sons. He sets up a defense plan, but is outwitted by Dragonpol. Bond still manages to kill Dragonpol and foil the attack.

In conclusion, Bond opens up about a possible wedding with Flicka.

== Publication history ==
- UK first hardback edition: July 1993 Hodder & Stoughton
- U.S. first hardback edition: May 1993 Putnam
- UK first paperback edition: May 1994 Coronet Books
- U.S. first paperback edition: June 1994 Berkley Books

== See also ==
- Outline of James Bond
