= The Spy Who Loved Me (video game) =

1990 video game

- Developer: The Kremlin
- Publisher: Domark
- Series: James Bond
- Platforms: Amiga, Atari ST, Amstrad CPC, Commodore 64, MS-DOS, ZX Spectrum
- Release: WW: 1990
- Mode: Single-player

James Bond: The Spy Who Loved Me is a home computer video game adaptation of the 1977 James Bond film The Spy Who Loved Me. The game was published by Domark for the Amiga, Atari ST, Amstrad CPC, Commodore 64, MS-DOS, and ZX Spectrum in 1990.

The Spy Who Loved Me is a top-down shooter in which the player navigates James Bond driving Wet Nellie, a modified Lotus Esprit. It features the characters from the film and some new characters.

== Critical reception ==
The game received a good, but not excellent, reaction on the ZX Spectrum, with CRASH! giving it a 79% rating and saying "Good Mr. Bond, but not quite good enough to deserve an accolade", Sinclair User giving it 72% and saying "This one will leave you shaken but not stirred; A competent movie licence", and Your Sinclair rating it at 76%, saying "Half good/half bad Bond game. There's quite a lot here though, so it's not bad value." It was less well received on the Commodore 64, with Zzap!64 giving it a rating of 38%, describing it as "an uninspiring and unambitious conversion".

== See also ==
- Outline of James Bond
