= Licence Renewed =

Novel by John Gardner (British writer)

- First edition
- Author: John Gardner
- Cover artist: Richard Chopping
- Language: English
- Series: James Bond
- Genre: Spy fiction
- Publisher: Jonathan Cape
- Publication date: 21 May 1981
- Publication place: United Kingdom
- Media type: Print (Hardcover and Paperback)
- Pages: 272 pp (first edition, hardback)
- ISBN: 0-224-01941-4 (first edition, hardback)
- OCLC: 8146232

Licence Renewed, first published in 1981, is the first novel by John Gardner featuring Ian Fleming's secret agent, James Bond. It was the first proper James Bond novel (not counting novelizations and a faux biography) since Kingsley Amis's Colonel Sun in 1968. Carrying the Glidrose Publications copyright, it was first published in the United Kingdom by Jonathan Cape and in the United States by Richard Marek, a G. P. Putnam's Sons imprint.

The release of Licence Renewed successfully relaunched the Bond literary franchise, being the first of 14 original novels by Gardner until his retirement in 1996. In that time frame Gardner also wrote two novelizations.

== Updating James Bond ==
In 1979 Glidrose Publications (now Ian Fleming Publications) approached John Gardner and asked him to revive Ian Fleming's James Bond series of novels.

When hired to begin a new series of James Bond novels, author John Gardner was tasked with updating James Bond and his allies and transporting them into the 1980s.

I described to the Glidrose Board how I wanted to put Bond to sleep where Fleming had left him in the sixties, waking him up now in the 80s having made sure he had not aged, but had accumulated modern thinking on the question of Intelligence and Security matters. Most of all I wanted him to have operational know-how: the reality of correct tradecraft and modern gee-whiz technology.

— John Gardner

Updating the time frame to the 1980s, Gardner's series picks up the career of James Bond some years after the Fleming novels ended. Due to the time frame change Gardner's series suggests that Fleming's stories took place in the 1960s and 70s, rather than the 1950s and 60s.

Likewise with James Bond, his companions and allies, specifically those working for the British Secret Service such as M, Bill Tanner, Miss Moneypenny, and Q are also all transported to the 1980s, although Q is rarely mentioned and is mostly substituted by Ann Reilly, a genius of gadgetry who is promptly nicknamed "Q'ute" by fellow workers as well as Bond, not long before being added to Bond's long list of romantic conquests.

The novel was initially titled Meltdown during the manuscript stage.

== Plot summary ==
When Licence Renewed begins, M reminds Bond that the "00" section has in fact been abolished; however, M retains Bond as a troubleshooter (pun intended), telling him, "You'll always be 007 to me".

The Director General of MI5, Sir Richard Duggan, approaches M for assistance. Noted terrorist Franco Oliveiro Quesocriado is believed to have been meeting Dr. Anton Murik, a renowned nuclear physicist, who has recently resigned under a cloud from the International Atomic Energy Research Commission. As MI5's remit is purely domestic, Duggan seeks M's help in tracking Franco's international movements, hoping to discover his intentions.

M, however, has other plans. Fearing that Murik, who is also the Laird of the Scottish village of Murcaldy, has hired Franco for his own purposes, M orders Bond to infiltrate Murik's organisation.

Bond makes contact with Murik at Ascot Racecourse, where he feigns a coincidental meeting. He tells Murik that he is a mercenary looking for work, and Murik invites Bond to Murcaldy Castle. There, Murik hires him to kill Franco. Franco, in turn, has been tasked by Murik to kill his young ward, Lavender Peacock, because she is the true heir to the Murik fortune, which could only be proved by secret documents Murik keeps hidden in a safe within his castle.

Murik's plan is to seize six nuclear power plants around the world simultaneously with the aid of bands of terrorists supplied by Franco. While the terrorists do take over the plants, Bonds deduces Murik's abort code, and the teams stand down, instead of triggering meltdowns. Thwarted, Murik is eventually defeated by Bond and Lavender.

== Characters ==
- James Bond - agent 007
- M - head of the British Secret Intelligence Service
- Bill Tanner - M's Chief of Staff
- Miss Moneypenny - M's secretary
- Ann Reilly aka Q'ute - Q Branch
- Dr. Anton Murik: the current Laird of Murcaldy, owning the village of Murcaldy as well as most of the land surrounding it. Murik is a brilliant nuclear physicist who had been kicked out of the Atomic Energy Commission for his radical beliefs on the safety of nuclear power. Murik had claimed to have designed a nuclear reactor that was as powerful as a standard nuclear power plant, but safely disposed of the nuclear waste - a view debunked by many other nuclear physicists. To make a point to the world that the current nuclear power plants in use around the world were unsafe, Murik planned to have terrorists infiltrate six plants simultaneously and start a global meltdown.
- Mary Jane Mashkin: Murik's mistress who attempts to become "more than friends" with James Bond to see if Bond was lying to Murik about being a mercenary looking for work.
- Lavender Peacock: Dr. Anton Murik's ward. Unbeknownst to her, she is the true heir to the Murik family fortune.
- Caber: Murik's personal bodyguard and the "Champion of Murcaldy". He especially dislikes Bond for beating him in a wrestling match in which Bond cheated to ensure victory.
- Franco Oliveiro Quesocriado: an international terrorist leader wanted in most European countries as well as some in the Middle East. He aids Murik by supplying willing terrorists for his meltdown operation and additionally accepts the task of assassinating Murik's ward, Lavender.

== The Silver Beast ==
In Licence Renewed Bond drives a Saab 900 Turbo. For some editions of the book, the car is shown as black or red on the book cover; however, in the book the car's colour is not mentioned. It only became silver and took on the nickname the "Silver Beast" in the follow-up Gardner novel, For Special Services.

The car is Bond's personal vehicle, updated at his own expense by Communication Control Systems Ltd (CCS), a real-life company (now known as Security Intelligence Technology Group) that provided author John Gardner with ideas about feasible gadgets to be used. Consequently, Gardner gave them the credit in the book and not Q Branch.

With the release of Licence Renewed Saab Automobile took the opportunity to launch a Bond themed promotional campaign complete with an actual car outfitted like the one in the book (but using smoke instead of tear gas).

== Influence on future Bond films ==
Some key plot elements in Licence Renewed may have had some influence on subsequent Bond films; most notably Anton Murik's plot of a nuclear disaster with the aid of an infamous terrorist which was the basis of The World Is Not Enough. Other key elements from Renewed that appeared in future Bond films were Anton's cheating at horse racing, which Max Zorin (Christopher Walken) did in A View to a Kill, and the obsession with weapons, not unlike Brad Whitaker (Joe Don Baker) in The Living Daylights. Licence Renewed also featured an in-air fight between Bond and the villain's henchman, Caber, on the cargo deck of a transport aircraft, which would be echoed in The Living Daylights.

== New 30th Anniversary reprints ==
To celebrate the 30th anniversary of Licence Renewed, all fourteen of John Gardner's James Bond books were republished by Orion in the UK starting in June 2011. The first five titles were released in hardback featuring their original covers. The rest of John Gardner's Bond books were released in the UK as paperbacks in 2012 as a redesigned collection. In the US, Pegasus released the first three John Gardner titles in newly designed paperback in the autumn of 2011. The editions featured new introductions from luminaries in the world of Bond, and were followed by a complete re-issue of all 14 titles in the US.

== Publication history ==
- UK first hardback edition: May 1981 Jonathan Cape.
- US first hardback edition: April 1981 Richard Marek/G. P. Putnam's Sons.
- UK first paperback edition: 1982 Coronet Books.
- US first paperback edition: May 1982 Berkley Books.

The U.S. hardcover edition sold more than 130,000 copies.

== Reviews ==
Reviews of the novel were mostly mixed.

Poet Philip Larkin writing in The Times Literary Supplement, felt that the book had no life of its own and lacked Fleming's compelling readability.

For Kingsley Amis, the book was "So sodding tame" and Gardner "can't write exciting stories." Later, Amis was to say the novel "was bad enough by any reasonable standard."

Listener crime critic Marghanita Laski, a long-time admirer of Gardner's books, said Licence Renewed "is competent and has its funny moments. But this fine thriller-writer can't perfectly adjust down to the simpler genre, and the world-destructive plot is a waste of Gardner, without ever really convincing as Bond."

Novelist Jessica Mann said in the British Book News that "Ian Fleming's James Bond books were never as crass as Licence Renewed. Writing for himself, Gardner is intelligent and original. In this Fleming rip-off, he reproduces Fleming's faults without their saving charms, except that he has cut down on the sex and sadism. Fleming's plots were always preposterous, but they carried a crazy, unifying conviction. Gardner's is just illogical. And how the mighty Bond is fallen; he has become a dull, dim — too many knocks on the head in the past, perhaps? — middle-aged man who chooses the wrong trade-names to advertise."

Nicholas Shrimpton, in the New Statesman, argued that Bond was best left in his own era. "What John Gardner has failed to realise is that the charm of Bond is as strictly related to a sense of period as that of Sherlock Holmes or Philip Marlowe. Removed from this distinctive environment, Bond is a fish out of water. The glamour shrivels, the self-indulgence becomes apologetic, and the atmosphere seems absurd."

Robin W. Winks said in the Library Journal that "Gardner lacks the sparkle of Fleming's truly original plotting and humor, and Lavender Peacock simply is not Pussy Galore. What's sound here isn't very new and what's new isn't very sound. 007's license is best left unrenewed."

The Globe and Mail crime fiction critic Derrick Murdoch complained that the villains were weak especially compared to Fleming's own, and that love interest Lavender Peacock is "a schoolgirl next to Pussy Galore." Murdoch also criticized the plot saying, "The story line is also a bit cluttered. There's one sub-plot about an international terrorist that seems derived indirectly from Robert Ludlum's The Bourne Identity, and another about a stolen birthright that could come directly from Victorian melodrama. In his Liquidator series, Gardner showed that he can be much slyer, funnier and bawdier than he has allowed himself to be here. It almost seems he has approached his task too respectfully in Licence Renewed."

People Magazine's anonymous reviewer felt that "Gardner's approach is sometimes too tame — as in the uninspiring title — but, on the whole, it's a treat to have Bond working again. Welcome back, old friend."

Novelist Michael Malone commented in The New York Times that "in License Renewed, the whole world seems scantier and blander, as if Bond could not shake off the malaise of those intervening years when the Government abolished his license to kill and stuck him in a desk job. He has less wit, less wardrobe and less sex drive. Miss Moneypenny even has difficulty arousing him. With his mechanized swashbuckling and elegant machismo, Bond was so suited to his time, so right in that age of astronauts and Thunderbirds, perhaps he should have decided you only live once."

Time Magazine praised Gardner's "way around military hardware, neo-villainy and a plot whose absurdity even Ian Fleming might admire. In classic style, Gardner piles picaresque on bizarre: Neanderthal henchmen, a medieval castle equipped with radar, cars that repel attackers with clouds of tear gas."

Kirkus Reviews believed Gardner was equal to the task. "More tongue-in-cheek than Fleming, but mindless fun as usual: savory fluff for the curious and the old fans too."

== See also ==
- Outline of James Bond
