= Win, Lose or Die =

Novel by John Gardner (British writer)

- First edition (UK)
- Author: John Gardner
- Language: English
- Series: James Bond
- Genre: Spy fiction
- Publisher: Hodder & Stoughton (UK); G. P. Putnam's Sons (US)
- Publication date: 1989
- Publication place: United Kingdom
- Media type: Print (Hardcover and Paperback)
- Pages: 220 pp
- ISBN: 0-340-41524-X
- OCLC: 20012807

Win, Lose or Die, first published in 1989, was the eighth novel by John Gardner featuring Ian Fleming's secret agent, James Bond. Carrying the Glidrose Publications copyright, it was first published in the United Kingdom by Hodder and Stoughton and in the United States by Putnam.

Beginning with this novel, and continuing for the remainder of the John Gardner series, Bond is promoted to the Royal Navy rank of captain.

== Plot summary ==
M receives word that a terrorist organisation known as BAST (Brotherhood of Anarchy and Secret Terrorism) is planning to infiltrate and destroy a top-secret Royal Navy aircraft carrier-based summit, the "Stewards' Meeting", scheduled a year hence, comprising American President George H. W. Bush, British Prime Minister Margaret Thatcher and Soviet General Secretary Mikhail Gorbachev. James Bond is returned to active duty in the Royal Navy and promoted from Commander to Captain, in order to infiltrate the aircraft carrier HMS Invincible and identify potential sleeper agents.

In the months leading to the top-secret summit, Bond spends his time training at Yeovilton learning to fly a Navy Sea Harrier jet. Learning of Bond's mission, BAST decides that he is a hindrance to their plans and attempts to kill him by attempting to shoot him down during a Sea Harrier training exercise. Later, when Bond goes on holiday in Italy, another attempt is made on his life. Bond escapes, but is apparently unable to save his then-current girlfriend, Beatrice Maria da Ricci.

Returning from holiday Bond boards HMS Invincible and is tasked with security for the "Stewards' Meeting", all while a massive war game is being carried out among the American, British, and Soviet Navies, known as Landsea '89. Before long Bond is at the centre of a murder investigation of an American Naval Intelligence officer, and he leaves to report the incident, BAST executes its plans to capture the ship and hold the world's three most powerful leaders for a $600 billion ransom.

== Characters ==
- James Bond
- M
- Bill Tanner
- Bassam Baradj: Born Robert Besavitsky in New York, Baradj is the main leader of BAST, codenamed "Viper." BAST's plot to take over and hold the world's three most powerful leaders was his idea. He is later shot by Beatrice Maria da Ricci in Gibraltar.
- Abou Hamarik: Hamarik, codenamed "Snake," is the second of three leaders of BAST. He is able to infiltrate HMS Invincible by killing an American Naval Intelligence officer who has been called into replace another that was murdered on board the carrier. Hamarik is found out and is wounded by Nikki Ratnikov after he had taken Bond and a number of secret service agents from the three nations hostage. After the incident, Hamarik is arrested by Bond.
- Clover Pennington: First Officer Clover Pennington is a Wren with the Royal Navy. She is secretly the third head of BAST, codenamed "Cat." Under Pennington's leadership while Bond is away BAST is able to take over the aircraft carrier with a number of supporters (all Wrens), who were aboard the ship for the Landsea '89 war game. Pennington is accidentally killed by one of her supporters after being used as cover and pushed into a room by Bond.
- Beatrice Maria da Ricci: Ricci is an operative working for the British secret service who has been tasked with protecting Bond, specifically while on holiday. She is supposedly killed while on holiday in Italy with Bond, however, she makes a return later on, informing Bond that her death was appropriately faked in order to save Bond from another attempt on his life by BAST. She and Bond later team up to arrest Bassam Baradj, although ultimately she kills Baradj while saving Bond's life.
- Nikki Ratnikov: Nikki Ratnikov is a secret service agent from Russia who was sent to protect Mikhail Gorbachev during the Steward's Meeting. She is killed by Abou Hamarik during an exchange of gunfire while on board HMS Invincible. During the exchange she successfully wounds Hamarik, which later leads to his arrest.

== Publication history ==
- UK first hardback edition: 1989 Hodder & Stoughton
- U.S. first hardback edition: July 1989 Putnam
- UK first paperback edition: 1990 Coronet Books
- U.S. first paperback edition: 1990 Berkley Books

== Reviews ==
Private Eye's anonymous critic complained that each Gardner book takes "Bond a further step or two away from the tall, resourceful ladykiller who first appeared in Casino Royale", and that "the real Bond atmosphere has been dead for upwards of 30 years." The critic also believed that Bond was a product of his times. "Gardner manages to remove most of the characteristics that made [Bond] interesting" and that the book's explosions, throat-cuttings and neck-breakings, "[have] an odd, perfunctory quality." The novel, "has none of Fleming's ability to build up tension or introduce detail casually. When Gardner talks knowledgeably about aircraft specifications the effect is only to reassure us that he has read the appropriate flight manual." The critic also notes that Gardner "can't quite bring himself to take it seriously."

Charles Champlin in the Los Angeles Times noted how different Fleming and Gardner are. "Ian Fleming wrote as a hedonist who prospered by dramatizing a life's worth of fantasies - acquisitions, indulgences, guilt-free sex and violence. John Gardner writes in Win, Lose or Die as a military affairs reporter who describes the operations of a Harrier VTOL aircraft as lovingly as Fleming described Pussy Galore. Gardner is long on facts, short on feelings. This is the eighth of the counterfeit James Bonds by Gardner." Commenting on the villain, Champlin writes, "Its leader, who intends to dispose of practically everyone, is as colorless a supervillain as ever Bond has faced. Call him Drabfinger." The book "is all so unamusing and juicelessly programmatic. The persistence of the series, despite these pallid copyings, is the ultimate tribute to the richness of Fleming's original invention."

The Globe and Mail critic Margaret Cannon said, "this isn't Ian Fleming's James Bond, but the eighth book written by John Gardner, the recreator of Bond, and it's a far cry from the original. Bond, with his libido and gadgetry, is a creation of the fifties, when sex was furtive and gadgets were fun. Today, such authors as Tom Clancy serve up real technological frights that make all of Bond's plots seem like the innocent revels they are. Furthermore, Gardner's Bond is too American – too breezy and beefy - to be the real 007. This one needs to RIP."

Kirkus Reviews said that, "Despite too many acronyms, too much artillery, and too many layers of deceptive identity, this is still one of Gardner's better Bonds, guaranteed to make you feel excited as well as a little foolish."

== See also ==
- Outline of James Bond
