= Live and Let Die (video game) =

1988 racing video game

Live And Let Die
- Developer: Elite Systems International
- Publisher: Domark
- Series: James Bond
- Platforms: Amiga, Atari ST, Amstrad CPC, Commodore 64, ZX Spectrum
- Release: WW: 1988
- Mode: Single-player

James Bond: Live And Let Die is a video game loosely based on the 1973 James Bond film Live and Let Die. The game was released by Domark for the Amiga, Atari ST, Amstrad CPC, Commodore 64, MS-DOS, and ZX Spectrum in 1988.

Live and Let Die is a racing game in which the player navigates James Bond driving a modified speedboat. It did not start as a Bond game, being a rebranding after Domark saw Elite Systems working on a game named Aquablast, and thought the boat driving and fighting of said title resembled the speedboat chase of Live and Let Die.
