= SeaFire =

Novel by John Gardner (British writer)

- First UK Hardback cover
- Author: John Gardner
- Language: English
- Series: James Bond
- Genre: Spy fiction
- Publisher: Hodder & Stoughton
- Publication date: September 1994
- Publication place: United Kingdom
- Media type: Print (Hardcover and Paperback)
- ISBN: 0-399-13938-9
- OCLC: 30510541
- Dewey Decimal: 823/.914 20
- LC Class: PR6057.A63 S37 1994

SeaFire, first published in 1994, was the fourteenth novel by John Gardner featuring Ian Fleming's secret agent, James Bond (including Gardner's novelization of Licence to Kill). Carrying the Glidrose Publications copyright, it was first published in the United Kingdom by Hodder & Stoughton and in the United States by Putnam.

== Plot summary ==
With the help of his latest girlfriend Flicka von Grüsse, James goes after billionaire Sir Maxwell Tarn, who thinks he's the next Hitler. Captain Bond now works for MicroGlobe One rather than an ill M whom he visits to cheer up and keep informed of the plot. The global trail takes 007 to Puerto Rico via Spain, Israel and Germany.

During the story, Bond proposes to Flicka. An old friend reappears to aid James and split up this spy twosome.

== Publication history ==
- UK first hardback edition: August 1994 Hodder & Stoughton
- U.S. first hardback edition: September 1994 Putnam
- UK first paperback edition: May 1995 Coronet Books
- U.S. first paperback edition: June 1995 Berkley Books

== See also ==
- Outline of James Bond
