= Q (James Bond) =

Fictional character from the James Bond franchise

- James Bond character
- First appearance: Casino Royale (1953) (Note: First mention of Q Branch); Dr. No (1958) (Note: First appearance of Major Boothroyd)
- Created by: Ian Fleming
- Portrayed by: Peter Burton (1962); Desmond Llewelyn (1963–1999); John Cleese (1999–2002); Ben Whishaw (2012–2021); Non-Eon: Geoffrey Bayldon (1967); Alec McCowen (1983); Alastair Mackenzie (2026)
- Voiced by: John Cleese (2000–2004)

In-universe information
- Alias: Major Boothroyd
- Occupation: Quartermaster
- Affiliation: MI6

Q is a character in the James Bond films and novelisations. Q is the head of Q Branch (later Q Division), the fictional research and development division of the British Secret Service charged with oversight of top secret field technologies.

Q (standing for quartermaster), like M, is a job title rather than a name. The use of letters as pseudonyms for senior officers in the British Secret Service was started by its first director, Captain Sir Mansfield George Smith-Cumming (1859–1923), who signed himself with a C written in green ink.

Q has appeared in 22 of the 25 Eon Productions James Bond films, the exceptions being Live and Let Die (1973), Casino Royale (2006) and Quantum of Solace (2008). Q also featured in both non-Eon Bond films, Casino Royale (1967) and Never Say Never Again (1983). Between 1963 and 1999, Q was portrayed in the Eon films by Desmond Llewelyn until his death in late 1999. His successor, initially given the joking nickname of "R" by Bond, was played by John Cleese. In the Daniel Craig films, which rebooted the continuity to some extent, Q was played by Ben Whishaw, but it is unclear whether he is meant to be Major Boothroyd or a new character.

== Novels ==
The character Q never appears in the novels by the author Ian Fleming, where Q and the Q Branch are only mentioned; however, Q does appear in the novelisations by Christopher Wood as well as the later novels by John Gardner and Raymond Benson, who adopted Eon's decision to combine the character with Major Boothroyd, the armourer from Dr. No.

In John Gardner's novels, the post of Q is taken over by Ann Reilly (called Q'ute by her colleagues). She also forms a relationship with James Bond. It is supposed that she held the post for a short while only, because Raymond Benson's novels return Boothroyd to the post without explanation. Jeffrey Deaver's Carte Blanche introduces the character Sanu Hirani, who is referred to as 'Q' in that novel.

Charles Fraser-Smith is widely credited as the inspiration for Q due to the spy gadgets he built for the Special Operations Executive. These were called Q-devices, after the Royal Navy's World War I Q-ships. In the Fleming novels there are frequent references to Q and Q Branch with phrases like "see Q for any equipment you need" (Casino Royale) and "Q Branch would handle all of that" (Diamonds Are Forever), with a reference to "Q's craftsmen" in From Russia, with Love.

=== Major Boothroyd ===
In the sixth novel, Dr. No, the service armourer Major Boothroyd appears for the first time. Fleming named the character after Geoffrey Boothroyd, a firearms expert who lived in Glasgow, who had written to the novelist suggesting that Bond was not using the best firearms available.

=== Ann Reilly ===
Boothroyd is also referenced occasionally in the Bond novels of John Gardner, but the author preferred instead to focus on a new character, Ann Reilly, who is introduced in the first Gardner novel, Licence Renewed, and promptly dubbed "Q'ute" by Bond.

=== Kim Sherwood novels ===
Q is a quantum computer in the Double 00 Trilogy by Kim Sherwood, originally developed by Major Boothroyd and maintained by a team of Q Branch technicians.

== Films & video games ==
Major Boothroyd appears in Dr. No played by Peter Burton and in the script of From Russia with Love. Desmond Llewelyn stated that, although he was credited as playing "Major Boothroyd" in the latter film, his name as said by M (Bernard Lee) was replaced with "the equipment officer", as director Terence Young stated that Boothroyd was a different character.

Beginning in Guy Hamilton's Goldfinger and in each film thereafter Major Boothroyd is most often referred to as Q; however, in The Spy Who Loved Me (1977) he is referred to once again as Major Boothroyd in dialogue.

In most films in which Q appears, he is restricted to a "behind the scenes" involvement, either based in London or in secret bases out in the field. Two notable exceptions in which Q becomes directly involved in Bond's missions occur in Octopussy, in which Q actually participates in field work—including the final battle against the villain Kamal Khan (Louis Jordan)'s henchmen—and Licence to Kill in which he joins Bond (Timothy Dalton) in the field after 007 goes rogue.

=== Eon Productions ===
==== Peter Burton: 1962 (as "Major Boothroyd") ====
In the first film, Dr. No, Boothroyd is played by Peter Burton in only one scene, in which he replaces Bond (Sean Connery)'s .25 ACP Beretta 418 (on-screen portrayed by a .32 Beretta 35) pistol with the signature .32 Walther PPK handgun. He is referred to by M as "the armourer," and later as Major Boothroyd. Scheduling conflicts prevented Burton from reprising the role in From Russia with Love, although he made two later uncredited appearances in Bond films, first as an RAF officer in Thunderball (1965) and later as a secret agent in the satirical Casino Royale (1967).

==== Desmond Llewelyn: 1963–1999 ====
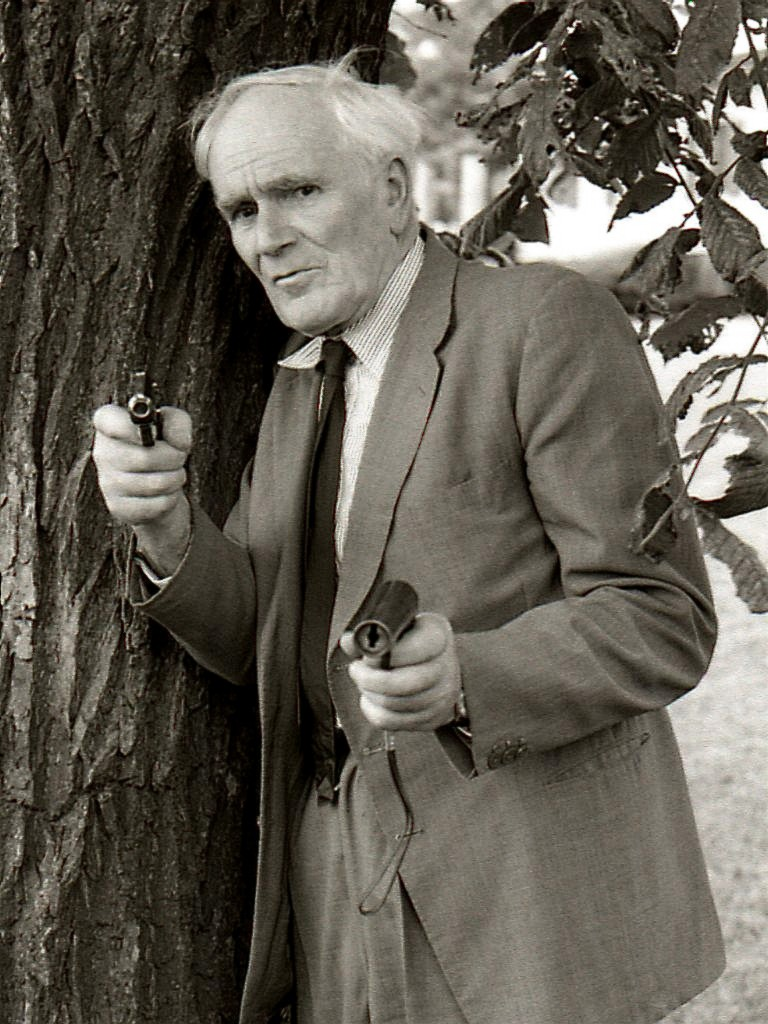
Desmond Llewelyn portrayed Q in the Eon series between 1963 and 1999.

Beginning with From Russia with Love, Desmond Llewelyn portrayed the character in every official film except Live and Let Die until his death in 1999. In the 1977 film The Spy Who Loved Me, as Q delivered the submersible Lotus, Major Anya Amasova / Agent XXX (Barbara Bach) greets Q as "Major Boothroyd".

Starting with Goldfinger, the notion that Bond and Q would have an often strained relationship with each other was introduced by Guy Hamilton; it continued in the series thereafter. While briefing Bond on the gadgets that he is going to use on his mission, Q often expresses irritation and impatience at Bond's short attention span, often telling him to "pay attention, 007", and Bond's playful lack of respect for his equipment, telling the agent, "I never joke about my work, 007". In Thunderball, Bond can be heard muttering "Oh no" when Q joins him in the Bahamas. A running gag appeared in later films where Q's prized gadget would be destroyed in a mishap often caused by necessity or Bond's recklessness despite Q’s stern warnings to return them in pristine condition – examples include the Glastron jet boat in Moonraker when Bond (Roger Moore) sends it over the Iguazu Falls to escape pursuit by Jaws (Richard Kiel), the Aston Martin Vantage in The Living Daylights when Bond (Timothy Dalton) is forced to prime its self-destruct device in order to evade the Slovak armed forces, and the BMW Z8 in The World Is Not Enough – which is cut in half by a helicopter buzz-saw.

However, on occasion, Q has shown a warm and fatherly concern for 007's welfare, such as at Bond (George Lazenby)'s wedding to Tracy di Vicenzo (Diana Rigg) in On Her Majesty's Secret Service, when he assures Bond that he is available if Bond ever requires his help. Q has also assisted Bond in a more active role in his missions in Octopussy, remaining to aid Bond in person even after another ally Vijay (Vijay Amritaj) is killed, and Licence to Kill saw him travel to assist Bond while he is officially on leave from MI6 even after Bond has resigned from MI6 to pursue his own vendetta. He frequently refers to Bond as "007", rather than by his name. In GoldenEye, Q shares a joke with Bond (Pierce Brosnan) for the first time, and in The World Is Not Enough Bond is saddened at the prospect of Q's impending retirement. Q signs off with "Now pay attention, 007," and then offers some words of advice:

Q: "I've always tried to teach you two things: First, never let them see you bleed."
Bond: "And the second?"
Q: "Always have an escape plan." – before he is lowered out of view.

The World Is Not Enough was the final film appearance of Desmond Llewelyn as Q in the James Bond series, although he would revive the role once again as Q in a Heineken commercial, a TV cross-promotion for the film. Llewelyn died in a car crash just weeks after the film's release. Between films he also starred as Q in various commercials for a diversity of products and companies. These included Bond collectable merchandise, Hyundai motorcars, LG video recorders, Highland Superstores, Visa credit cards, and Reach electric toothbrushes, the latter of which featured Q briefing himself in the mirror.

Featured in

Films:

- From Russia with Love (1963)
- Goldfinger (1964)
- Thunderball (1965)
- You Only Live Twice (1967)
- On Her Majesty's Secret Service (1969)
- Diamonds Are Forever (1971)
- The Man with the Golden Gun (1974)
- The Spy Who Loved Me (1977)
- Moonraker (1979)
- For Your Eyes Only (1981)
- Octopussy (1983)
- A View to a Kill (1985)
- The Living Daylights (1987)
- Licence to Kill (1989)
- GoldenEye (1995)
- Tomorrow Never Dies (1997)
- The World Is Not Enough (1999)

Video games:

- The Living Daylights (1987) (ZX Spectrum 007 Action Pack only; on narration tape, not in-game)
- Tomorrow Never Dies (1999) (Likeness only, voiced by Miles Anderson)
- 007: The World Is Not Enough (2000) (Likeness only, Nintendo 64 version only, voiced by Miles Anderson)
- 007 Racing (2000) (Archival footage, voiced by Miles Anderson)
- James Bond 007: Nightfire (2002) (Likeness only, voiced by Gregg Berger)
- James Bond 007: From Russia with Love (2005) (Likeness only, voiced by Phil Proctor)

Llewelyn also portrays Q in the Eon Productions-produced 1967 TV special Welcome to Japan, Mr. Bond, as well as portraying Q in the documentary Highly Classified: The World of 007, which is included on the Tomorrow Never Dies Ultimate Edition DVD. Llewelyn's likeness was also used to portray the Q character in 2005's video game James Bond 007: From Russia with Love, though the voice of Q was portrayed by Phil Proctor. Llewelyn has appeared in more Bond films — seventeen — than any other actor to date.

==== John Cleese: 1999 (as "R"), 2002 (as Q) ====
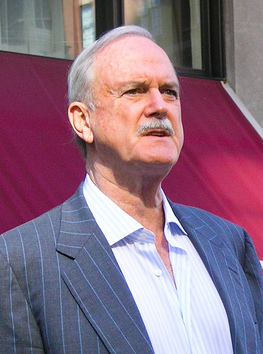
John Cleese portrayed "R" in The World Is Not Enough, who then became coded "Q" in the subsequent film Die Another Day.

In The World Is Not Enough an assistant to Q was introduced, played by John Cleese. His real name was never revealed, but he was initially credited as "R" in The World Is Not Enough, stemming from a joke in which Bond asks the elder Q, "If you're Q, does that make him R?"

Between films, Cleese was still referred to as "R" in the video games 007: The World is Not Enough (2000), 007 Racing (2000) and Agent Under Fire (2001). He was officially referred to as "Q" in Die Another Day (2002) following Llewelyn's death in 1999. In 2004, Cleese was featured as Q in the video game James Bond 007: Everything or Nothing.

Much like his predecessor, R is a consummate professional who is frequently annoyed by Bond's cavalier attitude. In Die Another Day, Bond at first refers to R as "Quartermaster" but, silently impressed by the gadgets he is given, calls him "Q" at the end of their meeting. (The Die Another Day DVD reveals that Bond initially saw R as an 'interloper', only awarding the proper title of 'Q' after R has proven himself.)

According to an interview on the Die Another Day DVD, Pierce Brosnan was very glad to rename Cleese's character 'Q', rather than 'R', because his native Irish accent made it difficult to pronounce 'R' with a convincing English accent.

In the 007 video game, James Bond 007: Everything or Nothing, Cleese's Q has an assistant, Miss Nagai, portrayed by Misaki Ito.

Featured in

Films:

- The World Is Not Enough (1999) (as R)
- Die Another Day (2002) (as Q)

Video games;

- 007: The World Is Not Enough (2000) (as R)
- 007 Racing (2000) (as R)
- Agent Under Fire (2001) (as R)
- Everything or Nothing (2004)
- 007 Scene It (board game)

==== Ben Whishaw: 2012–2021 ====
Ben Whishaw, the incumbent actor in the role, in Skyfall

The character of Q did not appear in 2006's Casino Royale or its sequel, Quantum of Solace (2008). Bond actor Daniel Craig expressed concern over the character's absence, and expressed his hope that Q would return in Skyfall. In November 2011, it was announced that British actor Ben Whishaw had been cast in the role. Bond first meets Q in front of the painting The Fighting Temeraire at the National Gallery in London, where he at first expresses disbelief at the relative youth of his new quartermaster, but the two quickly earn each other's respect. In Skyfall, Q's gadgets were comparatively simple, consisting of a miniaturized radio and a gun coded to Bond's palmprint so only Bond can fire it. When Bond appears disappointed, Q says, "Were you expecting an exploding pen? We don't really go in for that anymore," in reference to a miniature grenade featured in GoldenEye. Q is demonstrated to be highly knowledgeable on the subject of computer security to the point where he designed some of the most sophisticated security protocols in existence. As with Llewelyn's Q, he also gets frustrated with Bond's knack for damaging or destroying the gadgets –at the end of Skyfall his canonical Aston Martin DB5 is burned out in the final showdown with Raoul Silva (Javier Bardem).

In Spectre, Q injects Bond with "smart blood" which will allow MI6 to track him at all times. He then shows off an Aston Martin DB10 to Bond only to disappoint him by revealing it was reassigned to 009. He provides Bond with a new watch, while hinting the alarm is "rather loud" (eventually revealed to be explosive in the film's climax). He also oversees the restoration of Bond's Aston Martin DB5 after the events of Skyfall. Bond asks Q to help him disappear during his downtime; despite initial reluctance, Q agrees and helps Bond. Bond later steals (and ultimately destroys) the DB10, much to Q's dismay, although he still covers for him when M (Ralph Fiennes) asks Q where Bond has gone. Similar to Q's assistance to Bond in 1989's Licence to Kill, Q travels to Austria to help him in the field independent of MI6. While there, he outruns SPECTRE agents after a ring he eventually decodes, revealing the organisation's existence. Q returns to London to assist Eve Moneypenny (Naomie Harris) and M in foiling corrupt MI6 bureaucrat Max Denbeigh (Andrew Scott)'s launch of the Nine Eyes intelligence network. At the end he provides Bond with his remodeled Aston Martin DB5.

In No Time to Die, it is implied that Q is gay when Bond and Moneypenny interrupt him preparing a romantic dinner for another man. He provides Bond and 00 agent Nomi (Lashana Lynch) with a watch that generates an electromagnetic pulse and a portable radar mapping device, and instructs them on how to operate the "stealthy bird", a small submersible jet aircraft, before they infiltrate villain Lyutsifer Safin (Rami Malek)'s hideout. Q keeps in contact with Bond during the mission, and patches him through to his love interest Madeleine Swann (Léa Seydoux) after he decides to sacrifice his life to keep Swann and their daughter Mathilde safe. Q later joins M, Moneypenny, Nomi, and Bill Tanner (Rory Kinnear) in a toast to Bond's memory at the end of the film.

Featured in

- Skyfall (2012)
- Spectre (2015)
- No Time to Die (2021)

=== Non-Eon films ===
==== Geoffrey Bayldon: 1967 ====
In the 1967 version of Casino Royale, Q is portrayed by Geoffrey Bayldon, but instead of outfitting James Bond, he provides gadgets for Evelyn Tremble (who is portrayed by Peter Sellers). In the film, Q is assisted by Fordyce (John Wells). The sequence parodies the regular series' outfitting, and features Q presenting Tremble with an elaborate bullet-proof vest, laden with preposterous features ("a Beretta in the buttonhole, and a cute little mini-gun in the gusset").

Featured in

- Casino Royale (1967)

==== Alec McCowen: 1983 ====
In the 1983 film Never Say Never Again, Bond received his gadgets from a man (played by Alec McCowen) he referred to as Algernon and Algy. His opening line is "Nice to know old Q can still surprise you 00s". In sharp contrast to the personality of Q in Eon film series, Algy hopes to hear about "lots of sex and violence" from James Bond following his mission. In the closing credits, he is named as "Q" Algy. Q Branch itself is depicted as underfunded and ramshackle compared to the high-tech surroundings of the Eon films.

Featured in

- Never Say Never Again (1983)

=== Video games ===
These are the video game portrayals of Q not based on the character in the films.

==== Alistair Mackenzie: 2026 ====
The video game 007 First Light (2026) features an original Q, with Alastair Mackenzie providing the voice and motion capture.

Featured in

- 007 First Light (2026)

== Legacy ==
The real MI6's head of technology is one of the agency's four directors-general, reporting directly to Chief of the Secret Intelligence Service. While the Chief of SIS is called "C" and not "M", the head of technology is named "Q" after the Bond character, and the department's ethos is known as "Q culture".

Aston Martin refers to their in-house customisation service for the most demanding clients as "Q Branch" in reference to James Bonds iconic connection to the brand.

In June 2025, it was announced that Blaise Metreweli, currently the real-life Director-General of Technology and Innovation ("Q") at MI6, will become the Chief of the SIS ("C") in autumn 2025. She will become the first female head of the service.

== See also ==
- List of James Bond allies
