= John Gardner (British writer) =

English writer (1926–2007)

- John Gardner, c. 1984
- Born: 20 November 1926; Seaton Delaval, Northumberland, England
- Died: 3 August 2007 (aged 80); Basingstoke, Hampshire, England
- Education: St John's College, Cambridge
- Occupation: Author
- Spouse: Margaret Mercer (m. 1952; died 1997)
- Writing career
- Period: 1964–2007
- Genres: Spy fiction, crime fiction
- Notable works: Boysie Oakes novels; continuation James Bond novels

John Edmund Gardner (20 November 1926 – 3 August 2007) was an English writer of spy and thriller novels. He is best known for his James Bond continuation novels, but also wrote a series of Boysie Oakes books and three novels containing Sir Arthur Conan Doyle's fictional villain, Professor Moriarty.

During the Second World War, Gardner joined the Home Guard at the age of 13, served in the Fleet Air Arm and subsequently joined the Royal Marines: he later described himself as "the worst commando in the world". After demobilisation, he followed his father into the Church of England, studying theology at St John's College, Cambridge, and being ordained as a priest in 1953. After losing his faith, he left the church in 1958 and took a job as a drama critic at the Stratford-upon-Avon Herald.

Gardner's literary career began in 1964 with the autobiographical Spin the Bottle, which detailed his experience of alcoholism. In the same year, he published The Liquidator, a parody of James Bond in which the cowardly Boysie Oakes is mistakenly recruited as a British spy. The book was made into a film, and followed by seven further Oakes novels and four short stories over the next eleven years. He subsequently wrote further novels centred on the characters of Derek Torry and Herbie Kruger, a Scotland Yard inspector and an intelligence agent respectively. From the mid 1970s onwards, he published three novels using the character of Professor Moriarty from the Sherlock Holmes series.

Between 1981 and 1996, Gardner wrote fourteen James Bond novels and the novelisations of two Bond films, at the invitation of Ian Fleming's former production company, Glidrose Publications. Although commercially popular, his Bond novels were not a critical success: The Guardian considered them "dogged by silliness". He ended his work on Bond following a diagnosis of oesophageal cancer in the 1990s, and took a break from writing altogether in 1997, following the unexpected death of his wife, Margaret Mercer. In 2000, he resumed his literary work, publishing Day of Absolution in 2001 and Bottled Spider in 2002. The latter work introduced Detective Sergeant Suzie Mountford, named after Gardner's ex-fiancée, Patricia Mountford, who resumed her engagement with him after reading the book. He published a further four Suzie Mountford novels before his death in 2007, from suspected heart failure.

== Early life ==
John Edmund Gardner was born on 20 November 1926 in Seaton Delaval, a village in Northumberland. His parents were Cyril Gardner, a London-born Anglican priest who had been ordained in Wallsend in 1921, and Lena Henderson, a local girl; the couple were married in 1925. In 1933 the family moved to the market town of Wantage in what was then Berkshire, where Cyril took up the position of Chaplain at St Mary's, Wantage, and Gardner was educated at the local King Alfred's School.

During the Second World War he joined the Home Guard, despite being only 13 at the time. Gardner subsequently served in the Royal Navy's Fleet Air Arm, before transferring to 42 Commando, Royal Marines, for service in the Middle and Far East. Gardner considered himself "the worst commando in the world" and, despite being "a small-arms expert ... [who] also knew a lot about explosives", he admitted that "I bent an aeroplane I was learning to fly".

After the war he went up to St John's College, Cambridge, to study theology and was subsequently ordained as an Anglican priest in 1953. He realised that he had lost his faith and made an error in his career; he later admitted that during one sermon, "I didn't believe a word I was saying". He was released from the church in 1958 and took up a position as a drama critic with the Stratford-upon-Avon Herald. It was whilst at the Herald—aged 33—that Gardner realised he was an alcoholic, drinking two bottles of gin a day. He overcame his addiction and produced his first book as part of his therapy: the autobiographical Spin the Bottle, published in 1964. Critic and scholar John Sutherland says that of all the books Gardner published, it is "the one that most deserves to survive."

== Writing career ==
In 1964 Gardner began his novelist career with The Liquidator, in which he created the character Boysie Oakes who inadvertently is mistaken to be a tough, pitiless man of action and is thereupon recruited into a British spy agency. In fact, Oakes was a devout coward who was terrified of violence, suffered from airsickness and was afraid of heights and Gardner admitted of him that, "though I have denied it many times—he was of course a complete piss-take of J. Bond". The book appeared at the height of the fictional spy mania and, as a send-up of the whole business, was an immediate success. Reviewing the novel in The New York Times, Anthony Boucher wrote, "Mr. Gardner succeeds in having it both ways: He has written a clever parody which is also a genuinely satisfactory thriller." The book was made into a film of the same name by MGM and another seven light-hearted novels and four short stories about the cowardly Oakes appeared over the next eleven years.

Following the success of his Oakes books, Gardner created new characters: Derek Torry—a Scotland Yard inspector of Italian descent—and Herbie Kruger, the latter of which appeared in a series of novels published simultaneously with his Bond works. In the mid-1970s Gardner also wrote the first of three novels using the character of Professor Moriarty from the Sherlock Holmes series, the last of which was published posthumously. The third of this series, titled simply Moriarty, was delayed due to a dispute with the publisher, but was finally released shortly after his death. Erik Lee Preminger bought the film rights to the first of the trilogy—The Return of Moriarty—and wrote a script. Edgar Bronfman Jr., for Sagittarius Entertainment and Nat Cohen, for EMI Productions were to produce. Donald Sutherland was to portray Moriarty. Funding however fell through shortly before filming was to begin.

In 1979 Glidrose Publications (now Ian Fleming Publications) approached Gardner and asked him to revive Ian Fleming's James Bond series of novels. Between 1981 and 1996, Gardner wrote fourteen James Bond novels, and the novelizations of two Bond films. Gardner stated that he wanted "to bring Mr Bond into the 1980s", although he retained the ages of the characters as they were when Fleming had left them. Even though Gardner kept the ages the same, he made Bond grey at the temples as a nod to the passing of the years. With the influence of the American publishers, Putnam's, the Gardner novels showed an increase in the number of Americanisms used in the book, such as a waiter wearing "pants", rather than trousers, in The Man from Barbarossa. James Harker, writing in The Guardian, considered that the Gardner books were "dogged by silliness", giving examples of Scorpius, where much of the action is set in Chippenham, and Win, Lose or Die, where "Bond gets chummy with an unconvincing Maggie Thatcher". Whilst Gardner's Bond novels received a mixed reaction from the critics, they were popular and a number appeared in The New York Times Best Seller list, bringing the author commercial success.

Gardner had an ambivalent view on being the Bond author, once saying "I'm very grateful to have been selected to keep Bond alive. But I'd much rather be remembered for my own work than I would for Bond", while saying on another occasion that "I remain proud that my contribution to the Bond saga played a great part in its development". In the mid-1990s, after discovering he had oesophageal cancer, Gardner officially retired from writing Bond novels and Glidrose Publications quickly chose Raymond Benson to continue the literary stories of James Bond.

His break from writing lasted for five years, following the death of his wife, but after battling his illness he returned to print in 2000 with a new novel, Day of Absolution. Gardner also began a series of books with a new character, Suzie Mountford, a 1930s police detective.

The Globe and Mail crime critic Derrick Murdoch said, "John Gardner is technically a highly competent thriller novelist who never seems to be quite at ease unless he is writing in the same vein as another writer. (He has worked John le Carré and Graham Greene this way, and it's what makes him so well qualified to continue the James Bond saga.)"

The Crime Writers' Association short-listed The Liquidator, The Dancing Dodo, The Nostradamus Traitor, and The Garden of Weapons for their annual Gold Dagger award.

== Personal life ==
In 1952 Gardner married Margaret Mercer and the couple had two children. Gardner also had another daughter, the result of a long affair with Susan Wright, a former personal assistant to Peter Sellers. In 1989, Gardner and his family moved to the US and it was in America that he was diagnosed with cancer; firstly of the prostate and then, six years later, of the oesophagus. The subsequent medical treatment in the US left him near bankrupt and he returned to the UK in November 1996. Shortly after his return, in February 1997, Margaret died unexpectedly.

When Gardner returned to writing, his second book, Bottled Spider (published 2002), introduced a new character, Detective Sergeant Suzie Mountford. Gardner took the surname from Patricia Mountford, an ex-girlfriend to whom he had been engaged in 1949. When she read the book Mountford contacted Gardner through his publishers, and the two were subsequently engaged.

Gardner died on Friday 3 August 2007 from suspected heart failure.

== Works ==
=== Autobiography ===
- Spin the Bottle (1964)

=== Boysie Oakes novels ===
- The Liquidator (1964)
- Understrike (1965)
- Amber Nine (1966)
- Madrigal (1967)
- Founder Member (1969)
- Traitor's Exit (1970)
- The Airline Pirates (1970)
- A Killer for a Song (1975)

=== Derek Torry novels ===
- A Complete State of Death (1969)
- The Corner Men (1974)

=== Professor Moriarty novels ===
- The Return of Moriarty (1974)
- The Revenge of Moriarty (1975)
- Moriarty (1976)

=== Herbie Kruger novels ===
- The Nostradamus Traitor (1979)
- The Garden of Weapons (1980)
- The Quiet Dogs (1982)
- Maestro (1993)
- Confessor (1995)

=== The Railton family novels ===
- The Secret Generations (1985)
- The Secret Houses (1988)
- The Secret Families (1989)

=== James Bond novels ===
- Licence Renewed (1981)
- For Special Services (1982)
- Icebreaker (1983)
- Role of Honour (1984)
- Nobody Lives for Ever (1986)
- No Deals, Mr. Bond (1987)
- Scorpius (1988)
- Win, Lose or Die (1989)
- Licence to Kill (1989) – novelization of a film script
- Brokenclaw (1990)
- The Man from Barbarossa (1991)
- Death is Forever (1992)
- Never Send Flowers (1993)
- SeaFire (1994)
- GoldenEye (1995) – novelization of a film script
- Cold (1996)

=== Detective Sergeant Suzie Mountford novels ===
- Bottled Spider (2002)
- The Streets of Town (2003)
- Angels Dining at the Ritz (2004)
- Troubled Midnight (2005)
- No Human Enemy (2007)

=== Other novels ===
- The Censor (1970)
- Every Night's a Bullfight (1971)
- To Run a Little Faster (1976)
- The Werewolf Trace (1977)
- The Dancing Dodo (1978)
- Golgotha (1980)
- The Director (1982) (A re-working of his 1971 novel Every Night's a Bullfight.)
- Flamingo (1983)
- Blood of the Fathers (1992) (as by "Edmund McCoy". Later published under his own name in 2004.)
- Day of Absolution (2001)

=== Short story collections ===
- Hideaway (1968)
- The Assassination File (1974)

== Bibliography ==
- Adrian, Jack (1991). John Gardner: Overview in Twentieth-Century Crime and Mystery Writers ed. Lesley Henderson. Chicago and London: St. James Press. ISBN 978-1-55862-031-5.
- Benson, Raymond (1988). The James Bond Bedside Companion. London: Boxtree Ltd. ISBN 978-1-85283-233-9.
- Black, Jeremy (2005). The Politics of James Bond: from Fleming's Novel to the Big Screen. University of Nebraska Press. ISBN 978-0-8032-6240-9.
- Britton, Wesley Alan (2005). Beyond Bond: spies in fiction and film. Westport, Connecticut: Greenwood Publishing Group. ISBN 978-0-275-98556-1.
- Hirsch, Foster (2011). Otto Preminger: The Man Who Would Be King. Random House. ISBN 9780307489210.
- McCormick, Donald (1977). Who's who in spy fiction. London: Elm Tree Books. ISBN 0-241-89447-6.
- Sobin, Roger (2011). The Essential Mystery Lists: For Readers, Collectors, and Librarians. ReadHowYouWant.com. ISBN 978-1-4596-1375-1.
- Sutherland, John (2011). Lives of the Novelists: A History of Fiction in 294 Lives. Profile Books. ISBN 978-1-84668-157-8.
