= Coronet Books =

Imprint of Hodder & Stoughton

- Parent company: Hodder & Stoughton
- Status: Active
- Founded: 1966
- Country of origin: United Kingdom
- Headquarters location: London, England
- Official website: https://www.hodder.co.uk/imprint/hodder/coronet/page/hs-imprint-coronet/

Coronet Books was established in 1966 as the paperback imprint of Hodder & Stoughton. The imprint was closed in 2004 but then relaunched in 2010, publishing fiction and non-fiction in hardback and paperback, including works by Chris Ryan, Lorna Byrne, and Auberon Waugh.

== Selected works ==
- The French Connection – Robin Moore
- The Anderson Tapes – Lawrence Sanders (1971)
- The Shakeout - Ken Follett (1975)
- Bring on the Empty Horses – David Niven (1977)
- R. F. Delderfield, including the Avenue series and the A Horseman Riding By trilogy
- P. G. Wodehouse, including Jeeves and the Feudal Spirit (1977), Joy in the Morning (1977), Plum Pie (1983)
- The Moon’s a Balloon – David Niven (1981)
- Jeffrey Archer, including Kane and Abel (1981), The Prodigal Daughter (1983), and Shall We Tell the President? (1984)
- Mary Stewart, including the Merlin Trilogy in paperback: The Crystal Cave, The Hollow Hills, and The Last Enchantment (all 1983)
- Reissue of The Colditz Story – P.R. Reid (1983)
- Love Story – Erich Segal (1986)
- The Life and Loves of a She-Devil – Fay Weldon (1986)
- The Kill Zone – Chris Ryan (2010)
- Kiss Me, Chudleigh: The World According to Auberon Waugh – ed. by William Cook (2010)
- Stairways to Heaven – Lorna Byrne (2010)
- The Camera Never Lies – Tess Daly (2011)
- Osama – Chris Ryan (2012)
- Skimming Stones and Other Ways of Being in the Wild – Rob Cowen and Leo Critchley (2012)
- The 100 Most Pointless Things in the World – Alexander Armstrong and Richard Osman (2012)
- Happy Days – Olly Murs (2012)
- Sidemen: The Book – Sidemen (2016)
