= The Moneypenny Diaries =

Book series

The Moneypenny Diaries is a series of novels and short stories chronicling the life of Miss Jane Moneypenny, M's personal secretary in Ian Fleming's James Bond series; it is considered an official spin-off of the Bond books. The diaries are penned by Samantha Weinberg under the pseudonym Kate Westbrook, who is depicted as the book's "editor." The series is a trilogy of novels, although in 2006, Weinberg also published two short stories: "For Your Eyes Only, James" and "Moneypenny's First Date with Bond", both of which appeared in UK magazines and were republished in September 2020 as a free ebook.

== Stories in the series ==
- The Moneypenny Diaries: Guardian Angel (2005): The first diary fills in the gaps between a number of agent 007's missions including the period between On Her Majesty's Secret Service and You Only Live Twice, but also includes an entire backstory for Moneypenny. For the first time since Ian Fleming introduced the character alongside Bond in Casino Royale, Moneypenny is given a first name: Jane.
- "For Your Eyes Only, James" (2006 short story): Published in the November issue of Tatler, the short story tells the tale of a weekend shared between Bond and Moneypenny at Royale-les-Eaux (see Casino Royale) in 1956.
- Secret Servant: The Moneypenny Diaries (2006): Taking place around the time of The Man with the Golden Gun, the secret service is in chaos with one senior official on trial for treason, another having defected to Moscow, and agent 007 brainwashed by the Soviets.
- "Moneypenny's First Date with Bond" (2006 short story): Published in the November 11, 2006 issue of The Spectator, the short story tells the tale of Moneypenny's and James Bond's first meeting.
- The Moneypenny Diaries: Final Fling (2008): Kate Westbrook is trying to publish Miss Moneypenny's diaries, but everyone she speaks to about them is trying to stop her...

== See also ==
- James Bond uncollected short stories
