= Dr. No (novel) =

1958 novel by Ian Fleming

- First edition cover
- Author: Ian Fleming
- Cover artist: Pat Marriott
- Series: James Bond
- Genre: Spy fiction
- Publisher: Jonathan Cape
- Publication date: 31 March 1958
- Publication place: United Kingdom
- OCLC: 82839692
- Preceded by: From Russia, with Love
- Followed by: Goldfinger

Dr. No is the sixth novel by the English author Ian Fleming to feature his British Secret Service agent James Bond. Fleming wrote the novel in early 1957 at his Goldeneye estate in Jamaica. It was first published in the United Kingdom by Jonathan Cape on 31 March 1958. The novel centres on Bond's investigation into the disappearance in Jamaica of two fellow MI6 operatives. He establishes that they had been investigating Doctor No, a Chinese-German operator of a guano mine on the fictional Caribbean island of Crab Key. Bond travels to the island and meets Honeychile Rider and later Doctor No.

The novel began as a 1956 screenplay for the producer Henry Morgenthau III for a proposed television show entitled Commander Jamaica. When those plans foundered, Fleming adapted the ideas as the basis for a novel, provisionally titled The Wound Man. The book's eponymous villain was influenced by Sax Rohmer's Fu Manchu stories.

Dr. No was the first of Fleming's novels to face widespread negative criticism in Britain; Paul Johnson of the New Statesman dismissed the book as one of "Sex, Snobbery and Sadism". When released on the American market it was received more favourably. Dr. No was serialised in the Daily Express, first in an abridged story form and later as a comic strip. The story was adapted in 1962 as the first film in the Bond series, with Sean Connery in the lead role; in 2008 BBC Radio 4 broadcast a version with Toby Stephens as Bond.

== Plot ==
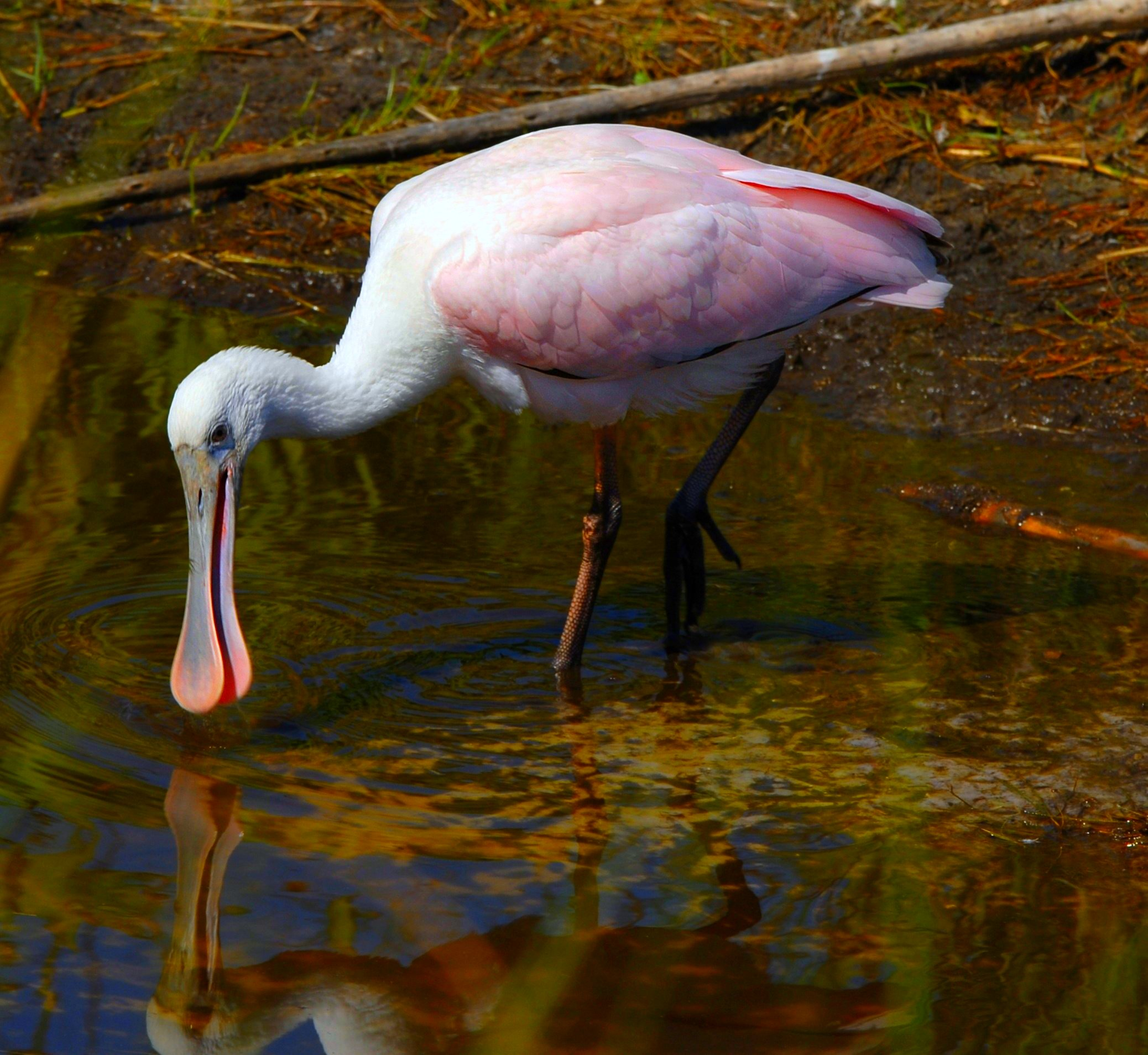
A roseate spoonbill

After recovering from serious poisoning inflicted by the SMERSH agent Rosa Klebb (in From Russia, with Love) the Secret Service agent James Bond is sent by his superior, M, on an undemanding mission to the British colony of Jamaica. He is instructed to investigate the disappearance of Commander John Strangways, the head of MI6's Station J in Kingston, and his secretary. Bond is briefed that Strangways had been investigating the activities of Doctor Julius No, a reclusive Chinese-German who lives on the fictional island of Crab Key and runs a guano mine. The island has a colony of roseate spoonbills at one end while local rumour is that a vicious dragon also lives there. The spoonbills are protected by the American National Audubon Society, two of whose representatives died when their plane crashed on No's airstrip.

On his arrival in Jamaica, Bond soon realises that he is being watched. His hotel room is searched, a basket of poisoned fruit is delivered to the room—supposedly a gift from the colonial governor—and a deadly centipede is placed in his bed while he is sleeping. With the help of an old friend, Quarrel, Bond surreptitiously visits Crab Key to establish whether there is a connection between No and the disappearance of the MI6 personnel. Bond and Quarrel meet Honeychile Rider, who is there to collect valuable shells. Bond and Rider are captured by No's men after Quarrel is burned to death by the doctor's "dragon"—a flamethrowing, armoured swamp buggy designed to keep away trespassers. Bond and Rider are taken to a luxurious facility carved into the mountain.

No tells Bond that he is working with the Russians and has built an elaborate underground facility from which he can sabotage US test missiles launched from Cape Canaveral. He had previously been a member of a Chinese tong, but after he stole a large sum of money from their treasury, he was captured by the organisation. The tong's leaders had No's hands cut off as a warning to others, and then shot him. Because No's heart was on the right side of his body, the bullet missed it and he survived.

Interested in the ability of the human body to withstand and survive pain, No forces Bond to navigate his way through an obstacle course constructed in the facility's ventilation system. Bond is kept under observation as he suffers electric shocks, burns and an encounter with large, venomous spiders. Bond's ordeal ends in a fight with a captive giant squid, which he defeats by using improvised weapons. After his escape he encounters Rider, who had been pegged out to be eaten by crabs; they had ignored her and she managed to escape.

Bond kills No by taking over the guano-loading machine at the docks and diverting the flow of guano to bury him alive. Bond and Rider then escape from No's complex in the "dragon" buggy, sail back to Jamaica and notify the colonial authorities.

== Background and writing history ==
In June 1956 the author Ian Fleming began a collaboration with the producer Henry Morgenthau III on a planned television series, Commander Jamaica, which was to feature the Caribbean-based character James Gunn. When the project foundered, and Fleming could not fashion a new plot for his next Bond novel, he used the idea as the basis for Dr. No. By January 1957 he had published four Bond novels in successive years from 1953—Casino Royale, Live and Let Die, Moonraker and Diamonds Are Forever. A fifth, From Russia, with Love, was being edited and prepared for publication. (Note: From Russia, with Love was published in April 1957.) That month Fleming travelled to his Goldeneye estate in Jamaica to write Dr. No. He followed his usual practice, which he later outlined in Books and Bookmen magazine: "I write for about three hours in the morning ... and I do another hour's work between six and seven in the evening. I never correct anything and I never go back to see what I have written ... By following my formula, you write 2,000 words a day." By the time he returned to London in late February, he had completed a 206-page first draft, which he initially titled The Wound Man.

Although Fleming did not date the events within his novels, John Griswold and Henry Chancellor—both of whom wrote books for Ian Fleming Publications—have identified different timelines based on episodes and situations within the novel series as a whole. Chancellor put the events of Dr. No in 1956; Griswold is more precise, and considers the story to have taken place that February and March.

As with his four previous novels, Fleming originated the concept of the front cover design; he considered Honeychile Rider to have a Venus-like quality when introduced in the book and wanted this emphasised on the cover. When commissioning Pat Marriott to illustrate the cover, he instructed that she was shown on a Venus elegans shell.

Prior to the release of Dr. No—and unconnected with the book itself—Bernard Bergonzi, in the March 1958 issue of Twentieth Century, attacked Fleming's work as containing "a strongly marked streak of voyeurism and sado-masochism" and that the books showed "the total lack of any ethical frame of reference". The article also compared Fleming unfavourably to John Buchan and Raymond Chandler in both moral and literary measures. The writer Simon Raven, while appreciating Bergonzi had produced a "quiet and well-argued article", thought the critic's conclusion was naïve, and asked "Since when has it been remarkable in a work of entertainment that it should lack a specific 'ethical frame of reference'?" Raven continued, saying Fleming "by reason of his cool and analytical intelligence, his informed use of technical facts, his plausibility, sense of pace, brilliant descriptive powers and superb imagination, provides sheer entertainment such as I, who must read many novels, am seldom lucky enough to find".

== Development ==
=== Plot inspirations ===
In March 1956 Fleming and his friend Ivar Bryce accompanied Robert Cushman Murphy (of the American Museum of Natural History) and Arthur Stannard Vernay (of the Flamingo Protection Society) on a trip to a flamingo colony on Great Inagua in the south of the Bahamas. The colony was 100 square miles (260 km^{2}) of dense mangrove swamp and salt flats, home to flamingos, egrets and roseate spoonbills; the location inspired Crab Key. Much of the travel overland on Great Inagua was by a swamp vehicle, a Land Rover fitted with over-large tyres that became the model for the "dragon" used in the story.

Fleming's inspiration for the Doctor No character was Sax Rohmer's villain Dr Fu Manchu, who featured in books Fleming had read and enjoyed in earlier years. Aspects of the plot were influenced by Rohmer's work, and Winder observes that the use of the centipede was "a straight steal" from a Fu Manchu novel; other devices from Rohmer's novels included Doctor No's secret lair and the use of the mad scientist trope.

After Diamonds Are Forever was published in 1956, Fleming received a letter from Geoffrey Boothroyd, a Bond enthusiast and gun expert, who criticised the author's choice of firearm for Bond. Boothroyd suggested that Bond should swap his Beretta for a Walther PPK 7.65 mm, an exchange that made it to the novel.

I wish to point out that a man in James Bond's position would never consider using a .25 Beretta. It's really a lady's gun—and not a very nice lady at that! Dare I suggest that Bond should be armed with a .38 or a nine millimetre—let's say a German Walther PPK? That's far more appropriate.

Boothroyd also gave Fleming advice on the Berns-Martin triple draw shoulder holster and a number of the weapons used by SMERSH and other villains. In thanks, Fleming gave the MI6 Armourer the name Major Boothroyd in Dr. No and M introduces him to Bond as "the greatest small-arms expert in the world".

As he had done in his previous novels, Fleming borrowed names from his friends and associates to use in his book; Ivar Bryce's housekeeper, May Maxwell, became Bond's Scottish "treasure" May. One of Fleming's neighbours in Jamaica, and later his lover, was Blanche Blackwell: Fleming named the guano-collecting ship in Dr. No as Blanche. (Note: Fleming later used Blanche as the model for Pussy Galore in his novel Goldfinger, while Blackwell gave him a boat called Octopussy, the name of which he used for a later short story.) His friend Patricia Wilder found that her nickname of Honey Chile was used for the novel's main female character, and John Fox-Strangways—a friend from the gentlemen's club White's—saw part of his surname being used for the name of the MI6 station chief in Jamaica. Fleming also used the physical descriptions of people he knew; Quarrel, who previously appeared in the novel Live and Let Die, was based on a Jamaican fisherman who often took Fleming shark fishing.

=== Characters ===
James Bond is the culmination of an important but much-maligned tradition in English literature. As a boy, Fleming devoured the Bulldog Drummond tales of Lieutenant Colonel Herman Cyril McNeile (aka "Sapper") and the Richard Hannay stories of John Buchan. His genius was to repackage these antiquated adventures to fit the fashion of postwar Britain ... In Bond, he created a Bulldog Drummond for the jet age.

— William Cook in the New Statesman

In Dr. No, for the first time in the Bond novels, there is friction between Bond and M, brought about because Bond was nearly killed by the SMERSH agent Rosa Klebb in From Russia, with Love. M orders Bond to use a new gun and sends him on a holiday assignment, which Bond resents. The writer Raymond Benson—who later wrote a series of Bond novels—sees M at his most authoritarian in Dr. No, punishing Bond in terms of both stripping him of his gun and then sending him on what both Bond and M considered at first to be a "soft" assignment.

Honeychile Rider is one of three women in the Bond canon who have been scarred by rape. (Note: Tiffany Case in Diamonds Are Forever and Pussy Galore in Goldfinger being the others.) This follows a pattern where the women Bond comes across are somehow different to the norm, although the cultural historian Jeremy Black points out that this gives Bond an opportunity to help and save both Rider and the others. Other female characters in the Bond series have flaws, and Rider has a broken nose—the result of the rape she suffered. (Note: Another example of a physical flaw is Domino Vitali in Thunderball, who has one slightly shorter leg.) The cultural historians Janet Woollacott and Tony Bennett, in their analysis of the roles of women in the Bond novels, consider that Rider is "not archetypically feminine", but is "constructed according to the formula 'equal but yet subordinate'." Rider is described in the book as having buttocks like a boy, which brought a response from Fleming's friend Noël Coward that "I was also slightly shocked by the lascivious announcement that Honeychile's bottom was like a boy's. I know that we are all becoming more broadminded nowadays, but really old chap what could you have been thinking of?"

Black, reviewing all the villains in the series, wrote:

Fleming did not use class enemies for his villains, instead relying on physical distortion or ethnic identity ... Furthermore, in Britain foreign villains used foreign servants and employees ... This racism reflected not only a pronounced theme of interwar adventure writing, such as the novels of [John] Buchan, but also widespread literary culture.

Dr. No is physically disfigured, like many of Bond's later adversaries; No is 6 feet 6 inches (1.98 m) tall, with steel pincers for hands and has dextrocardia. Bond describes him as "a giant venomous worm wrapped in grey tin-foil". Benson considers that No is "a wickedly successful villain", the best since Hugo Drax in Moonraker, while Time thought No to be "one of the less forgettable characters in modern fiction".

Quarrel was Fleming's idealised concept of a black person, and the character was based on his genuine liking for Jamaicans, whom he saw as "full of goodwill and cheerfulness and humour". The relationship between Bond and Quarrel was based on a presumption of Bond's superiority. Fleming described the relationship as "that of a Scots laird with his head stalker; authority was unspoken and there was no room for servility". Winder considers the scenes with Quarrel to be "embarrassingly patronising but nonetheless hypnotic".

== Style ==
In From Russia, with Love Fleming experimented with an unusual narrative structure that saw Bond's entry into the story delayed until chapter eleven. (Note: The first ten chapters consist of a description of Bond's opponents and the background to his mission.) For Dr. No he returned to the conventional form with which he felt comfortable—that of the thriller writers of the early 20th century. (Note: These included the works of Sax Rohmer and Edgar Wallace.) (Note: Fleming told his publisher that from then on he would write "the same book over and over again", with only the background changing.) As a result, the story's villain is closer to the intellectual "gentleman crook" of the golden age of detective fiction, and the novel's focus is on action at the expense of character development and depth of plot.

Benson describes the "Fleming Sweep" as taking the reader from one chapter to another using "hooks" at the end of chapters to heighten tension and pull the reader onto the next. He feels that the "Fleming Sweep briskly propels the plot" of Dr. No through chapters that are longer than in previous Bond novels; Black also likes Dr. No's pacing, despite considering it inconsistent in places. Winder believes that the novel's plotting is chaotic, although he still feels the book "can be read over and over again with immense pleasure".

Dr. No was very cardboardy and need not have been ... The trouble is that it is much more fun to think up fantastic situations and mix Bond up in them.

— Ian Fleming

Fleming used known brand names and everyday details to produce a sense of realism, which the writer Kingsley Amis calls "the Fleming effect". Amis describes "the imaginative use of information, whereby the pervading fantastic nature of Bond's world ... [is] bolted down to some sort of reality, or at least counter-balanced." The journalist and writer Matthew Parker sees the novel as "the most fantastical, gothic and melodramatic; and at times frankly, even knowingly, over the top", while Black considers the fantastic element of Doctor No's underground lair to be a "weak" and "bizarre" part of the story. When the writer Raymond Chandler reviewed the novel, he thought "that the long sensational business which is the heart of the book not only borders on fantasy. It plunges in with both feet. Ian Fleming's impetuous imagination has no rules." Writing in 1963, Fleming acknowledged his plots were "fantastical while often being based in truth. They go wildly beyond the probable but not, I think, beyond the possible".

== Themes ==
Two main themes run through Dr. No: the meaning of power; and the concept of friendship and loyalty. Bond talks about the meaning of power with several villains in the series. His conversation with Doctor No reveals that the latter believes it can only be secured through the privacy required to maintain the sovereignty of his island. No quotes Carl von Clausewitz's first principle—about having a secure base from which to operate—in support of his argument. According to Panek, in his examination of 20th century British spy novels, Dr. No "shows a shift towards emphasizing the intellect and organizing power of the individual", as opposed to a group or nation. Black considers that although it is American assets that are under threat from the Soviet Union, it is British power, through the British agent, that concludes the issue. This is reinforced at the end of the book, when a Royal Navy warship is despatched to the island. In Black and Parker's views, the display of power projection by Britain, with no assistance from the United States, portrayed the British Empire as an enduring force.

The concept of friendship and loyalty is the second major theme. The relationship between Bond and Quarrel, the Cayman Islander, is mutually felt. According to Lindner, Quarrel is "an indispensable ally" who had assisted Bond in Live and Let Die. Benson sees no racial discrimination in the relationship between the two men and acknowledges that Bond feels genuine remorse and sadness at Quarrel's death.

== Publication and reception ==
=== Publication history ===
Dr. No was released on 31 March 1958 in the UK as a hardcover edition by the publishers Jonathan Cape. A paperback edition was issued by Pan Books in February 1960; over 115,000 copies were sold that year. The first American edition was published in June 1958 by Macmillan under the name Doctor No. The largest boost in sales of the novel came in 1962 with the release of the film adaptation. In the seven months after the picture's release, 1.5 million copies of the book were sold. In 1964 the novel was serialised in France-Soir for the French market, which led to increased sales of Bond works in that country; 480,000 French-language copies of the six Bond novels were sold that year. Since its initial publication the book has been issued in numerous hardback and paperback editions, translated into several languages and has never been out of print.

In 2023 Ian Fleming Publications—the company that administers all Fleming's literary works—had the Bond series edited as part of a sensitivity review to remove or reword some racial or ethnic descriptors. The rerelease of the series was for the 70th anniversary of Casino Royale, the first Bond novel.

=== Reviews ===
For the first time in the Bond series, Fleming encountered harsh criticism. The most virulent came from Paul Johnson of the New Statesman, who opened his review, "Sex, Snobbery and Sadism", with: "I have just finished what is, without doubt, the nastiest book I have ever read". He went on to say that "by the time I was a third of the way through, I had to suppress a strong impulse to throw the thing away". Although he recognised that Bond represented "a social phenomenon of some importance", he saw this as a negative element, as the phenomenon concerned "three basic ingredients in Dr. No, all unhealthy, all thoroughly English: the sadism of a schoolboy bully, the mechanical, two-dimensional sex-longings of a frustrated adolescent, and the crude, snob-cravings of a suburban adult". Johnson saw no positives in Dr. No, saying that "Mr Fleming has no literary skill, the construction of the book is chaotic, and entire incidents and situations are inserted, and then forgotten, in a haphazard manner."

Perhaps these are superficial excuses. Perhaps Bond's blatant heterosexuality is a subconscious protest against the current fashion for sexual confusion. Perhaps the violence springs from a psychosomatic rejection of Welfare wigs, teeth and spectacles and Bond's luxury meals are simply saying "no" to toad-in-the-hole and tele-bickies. Who can say? Who can say whether or not Dr Fu Manchu was a traumatic image of Sax Rohmer's father? Who, for the matter of that, cares?

— Ian Fleming, letter to The Manchester Guardian

Maurice Richardson, of The Observer, considered the novel "the usual sado-masochistic free-for-all, plus octopuses". The unnamed critic in The Manchester Guardian referred to Johnson's "sex, snobbery and sadism" complaint. They highlighted the "sinister ... cult of luxury for its own sake", with Bond's enjoyment of branded and bespoke products, but disagreed with part of Johnson's summary that the novel was a sign of moral decay; rather, "we should be grateful to Mr. Fleming for providing a conveniently accessible safety-valve for the boiling sensibility of modern man." This reviewer also conceded that while "the casualties take place on a somewhat narrower front than usual, they are heavy". In April 1958, Fleming wrote to The Manchester Guardian in defence of his work, referring to both that paper's review of Dr. No and the article in The Twentieth Century. Fleming partly accepted the criticism concerning the exclusivity of Bond's objects, such as cigarettes and food, but defended it on the basis that "I had to fit Bond out with some theatrical props". These included his cocktail, ("The Vesper") and Bond's diet. Fleming called these devices "vulgar foibles" which he was saddled with, although maybe, he suggested, "Bond's luxury meals are simply saying 'no' to toad-in-the-hole and tele-bickies."

Writing in The Times Literary Supplement, Philip Stead was more generous to Dr. No. Despite thinking that Fleming was offering "too opulent a feast" with the book, Stead argued that Fleming managed to pull this off, where "a less accomplished writer ... would never have got away with this story." Chandler reviewed the novel for The Sunday Times and praised as "masterly" Fleming's depiction of colonial Kingston in the first chapter. Chandler admired Fleming's writing, which had "an acute sense of pace. ... You don't have to work at Ian Fleming. He does the work for you."

The reviewer for Time acknowledged the critical storm around Fleming and Dr. No, but was broadly welcoming of the book, writing that while "not all readers will agree that Dr. No ... is magnificent writing, ... pages of it, at least, qualify for Ezra Pound's classic comment on Tropic of Cancer: 'At last, an unprintable book that is readable'." In The New York Times, Anthony Boucher—described by Fleming's biographer John Pearson as "throughout an avid anti-Bond and an anti-Fleming man"—was again damning of Fleming's work, saying "it's harder than ever to see why an ardent coterie so admires Ian Fleming's tales". Benson described Boucher's critique as "true to form" and "a tirade" as Boucher concluded his review by saying: "it is 80,000 words long, with enough plot for 8,000 and enough originality for 800."

Glendy Culligan of The Washington Post described the novel as a "thin little whodunit which rocked the British Empire and shook the English Establishment", adding "Bully for it!" Culligan admitted that "Confidentially though, we enjoyed Dr. No, and if this be sick, sick, sick, gentlemen, make the most of it." James Sandoe in his book review for The New York Herald Tribune was very positive about Dr. No and thought that it was "the most artfully bold, dizzyingly poised thriller of the decade. You'd much better read it than read about it."

The writer Simon Winder believes that because Fleming was writing about Jamaica, the result was "perhaps the most attractive of all the Bond books—the most relaxed, the most fiendish, the most confident". According to the literary analyst LeRoy L. Panek, in his examination of 20th century British spy novels, Fleming knew his outdated view of Jamaica would soon be overtaken by events—as evidenced by the novel's description of how the Queen's Club would be lost during independence struggles. (Note: The Queen's Club was based upon the Liguanea Club, a recreational and social establishment in Kingston.) According to the cultural historian Michael Denning, this acknowledgement of the end-of-empire leads to a "sense of doom" that is the result of "a shadow of real history hanging over the stories".

== Adaptations ==
Dr. No was serialised in the Daily Express from 19 March to 1 April 1958. In 1960 the novel was adapted as a daily comic strip in the paper and was syndicated worldwide. The strip, which ran from May to October, was written by Peter O'Donnell and illustrated by John McLusky. It was reprinted in 2005 by Titan Books as part of the Dr. No anthology that also includes Diamonds Are Forever and From Russia, with Love. In 1962 the American men's magazine Stag serialised the story, renaming it as "Nude Girl of Nightmare Key".

The film Dr. No was released in 1962, produced by Albert R. Broccoli and Harry Saltzman, and directed by Terence Young. It was the first Bond film in the Eon Productions series; Sean Connery portrayed Bond, with Joseph Wiseman as Doctor No and Ursula Andress as Honeychile Rider, renamed Honey Ryder. Although the story follows the same general storyline, there are some changes: the film shows No to be an operative of the fictional crime organisation SPECTRE and his island fortress is nuclear-powered; No is killed not by a surge of guano, but by drowning in reactor coolant. The novel was dramatised for BBC Radio 4 in May 2008. The actor Toby Stephens played Bond, (Note: Stephens played the villain Gustav Graves in the Bond film Die Another Day in 2002.) while No was played by David Suchet.

== Notes and references ==
=== Sources ===
- Amis, Kingsley (1966). The James Bond Dossier. London: Pan Books. OCLC 154139618.
- Bennett, Tony; Woollacott, Janet (2009). "The Moments of Bond". In Lindner, Christoph (ed.). The James Bond Phenomenon: a Critical Reader. Manchester: Manchester University Press. pp. 13–34. ISBN 978-0-7190-6541-5.
- Bennett, Tony; Woollacott, Janet (1987). Bond and Beyond: The Political Career of a Popular Hero. London: Routledge. ISBN 978-0-416-01361-0.
- Benson, Raymond (1988). The James Bond Bedside Companion. London: Boxtree. ISBN 978-1-85283-233-9.
- Black, Jeremy (2005). The Politics of James Bond: from Fleming's Novel to the Big Screen. Lincoln, NE: University of Nebraska Press. ISBN 978-0-8032-6240-9. Archived from the original on 23 March 2023.
- Butler, William Vivian (1973). The Durable Desperadoes. London: Macmillan. ISBN 978-0-333-14217-2.
- Chancellor, Henry (2005). James Bond: The Man and His World. London: John Murray. ISBN 978-0-7195-6815-2.
- Chapman, James (2009). Licence to Thrill: A Cultural History of the James Bond Films. New York: I.B. Tauris. ISBN 978-1-84511-515-9.
- Denning, Michael (2009). "Licensed to Look". In Lindner, Christoph (ed.). The James Bond Phenomenon: a Critical Reader. Manchester: Manchester University Press. pp. 56–75. ISBN 978-0-7190-6541-5.
- Eco, Umberto (2009). "The Narrative Structure of Ian Fleming". In Lindner, Christoph (ed.). The James Bond Phenomenon: a Critical Reader. Manchester: Manchester University Press. pp. 34–55. ISBN 978-0-7190-6541-5.
- Faulks, Sebastian; Fleming, Ian (2009). Devil May Care. London: Penguin Books. ISBN 978-0-14-103545-1.
- Fleming, Ian; Gammidge, Henry; McLusky, John (1988). Octopussy. London: Titan Books. ISBN 1-85286-040-5.
- Fleming, Ian (2006). Dr No. London: Penguin Books. ISBN 978-0-14-102827-9.
- Griswold, John (2006). Ian Fleming's James Bond: Annotations and Chronologies for Ian Fleming's Bond Stories. Bloomington, IN: AuthorHouse. ISBN 978-1-4259-3100-1. Archived from the original on 9 July 2023.
- Lindner, Christoph (2009). The James Bond Phenomenon: a Critical Reader. Manchester: Manchester University Press. ISBN 978-0-7190-6541-5. Archived from the original on 10 April 2023.
- Lycett, Andrew (1996). Ian Fleming. London: Phoenix. ISBN 978-1-85799-783-5.
- Macintyre, Ben (2008). For Your Eyes Only. London: Bloomsbury Publishing. ISBN 978-0-7475-9527-4.
- McLusky, John; Gammidge, Henry; Hern, Anthony; Fleming, Ian (2009). The James Bond Omnibus Vol.1. London: Titan Books. ISBN 978-1-84856-364-3.
- Panek, LeRoy (1981). The Special Branch: The British Spy Novel, 1890–1980. Bowling Green, OH: Bowling Green University Popular Press. ISBN 978-0-87972-178-7.
- Parker, Matthew (2014). Goldeneye. London: Hutchinson. ISBN 978-0-09-195410-9.
- Pearson, John (1967). The Life of Ian Fleming. London: Pan Books. OCLC 669702874.
- Smith, Jim; Lavington, Stephen (2002). Bond Films. London: Virgin Books. ISBN 978-0-7535-0709-4.
- Winder, Simon (2006). Introduction. Dr No. By Fleming, Ian. London: Penguin Books. ISBN 978-0-14-102827-9.
