= Danubia (disambiguation) =

Danubia is a region embracing the land on the banks of the Danube river.

Danubia may also refer to:

- Danubia (minor planet), a minor planet
- Danubia, a book by Simon Winder about the Habsburg monarchy
