= James Bond =

Media franchise about a British spy

- Ian Fleming's image of James Bond; commissioned to aid the Daily Express comic strip artists
- Created by: Ian Fleming
- Original work: Casino Royale (1953)
- Years: 1953–present

Print publications
- Novels: List of novels
- Short stories: See list of novels
- Comics: List of comic books
- Comic strip: James Bond (1958–1983)

Films and television
- Films: List of films
- Short films: Happy and Glorious (2012)
- Television series: "Casino Royale" (Climax! season 1 – episode 3) (1954)
- Animated series: James Bond Jr. (1991)

Games
- Traditional: Various
- Role-playing: James Bond 007: Role-Playing In Her Majesty's Secret Service
- Video games: List of video games

Audio
- Radio program: Radio dramas
- Original music: Music

Miscellaneous
- Toy: Various
- Portrayers: Pierce Brosnan; Sean Connery; Daniel Craig; Timothy Dalton; Patrick Gibson; Bob Holness; Michael Jayston; George Lazenby; Roger Moore; Barry Nelson; David Niven; Toby Stephens

The James Bond franchise focuses on the character of James Bond, a fictional British Secret Service agent created in 1953 by writer Ian Fleming, who featured him in twelve novels and two short-story collections. Since Fleming's death in 1964, nine other authors have written authorised Bond novels or novelisations: Kingsley Amis, Christopher Wood, John Gardner, Raymond Benson, Sebastian Faulks, Jeffery Deaver, William Boyd, Anthony Horowitz and Charlie Higson. The latest novel is On His Majesty's Secret Service by Charlie Higson, published in May 2023. Charlie Higson wrote a series on a young James Bond, and Kate Westbrook wrote three novels based on the diaries of a recurring series character, Moneypenny.

The character—also known by the code number 007 (pronounced "double-oh-seven")—has also been adapted for television, radio, comic strips, video games and film. The James Bond franchise is one of the highest-grossing media franchises of all time. The films constitute one of the longest continually running film series and have grossed over US$7.04 billion in total at the box office, making James Bond the fifth-highest-grossing film series to date. It started in 1962 with Dr. No, starring Sean Connery as Bond. As of 2021, there have been twenty-five films in the Eon Productions series. The most recent Bond film, No Time to Die (2021), stars Daniel Craig in his fifth and final portrayal of Bond; he is the sixth actor to play Bond in the Eon series. There have also been two independent Bond film productions: Casino Royale (a 1967 spoof starring David Niven) and Never Say Never Again (a 1983 remake of an earlier Eon-produced film, 1965's Thunderball, both starring Connery). Casino Royale has also been adapted for television, as a one-hour show in 1954 as part of the CBS series Climax!.

The Bond films are renowned for a number of features, including their soundtracks; three of the movies' theme songs have received Academy Awards and others have received nominations. Other important elements which run through most of the films include Bond's cars, his guns, and the gadgets with which he is supplied by Q Branch. The films are also noted for Bond's relationships with various women, who are popularly referred to as "Bond girls".

== Publication history ==
=== Creation and inspiration ===
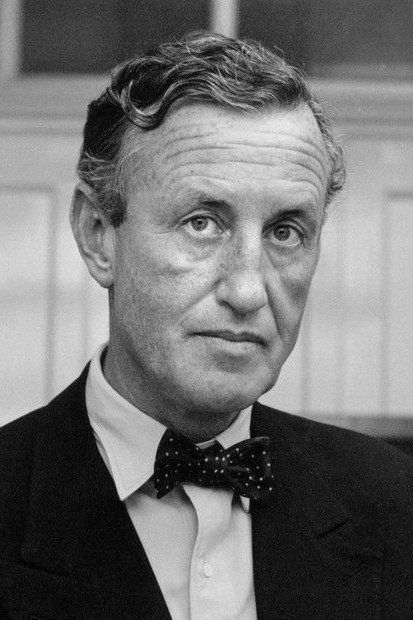
James Bond creator Ian Fleming in 1958

Ian Fleming created the fictional character of James Bond as the central figure for his works. Bond is an intelligence officer in the Secret Intelligence Service, commonly known as MI6. Bond is known by his code number, 007, and was a Royal Naval Reserve Commander. Fleming based his fictional creation on a number of people he came across during his time in the Naval Intelligence Division and 30 Assault Unit during the Second World War, admitting that Bond "was a compound of all the secret agents and commando types I met during the war". Among those types were his brother, Peter, who had been involved in behind-the-lines operations in Norway and Greece during the war. Aside from Fleming's brother, a number of others also provided some aspects of Bond's make up, including Conrad O'Brien-ffrench, Patrick Dalzel-Job, Bill "Biffy" Dunderdale and Duško Popov.

The name James Bond came from that of the American ornithologist James Bond, a Caribbean bird expert and author of the definitive field guide Birds of the West Indies. Fleming, a keen birdwatcher himself, had a copy of Bond's guide and he later explained to the ornithologist's wife that "It struck me that this brief, unromantic, Anglo-Saxon and yet very masculine name was just what I needed, and so a second James Bond was born". He further explained that:

When I wrote the first one in 1953, I wanted Bond to be an extremely dull, uninteresting man to whom things happened; I wanted him to be a blunt instrument ... when I was casting around for a name for my protagonist I thought by God, [James Bond] is the dullest name I ever heard.

— Ian Fleming, The New Yorker, 21 April 1962

On another occasion, Fleming said: "I wanted the simplest, dullest, plainest-sounding name I could find, 'James Bond' was much better than something more interesting, like 'Peregrine Carruthers'. Exotic things would happen to and around him, but he would be a neutral figure—an anonymous, blunt instrument wielded by a government department."

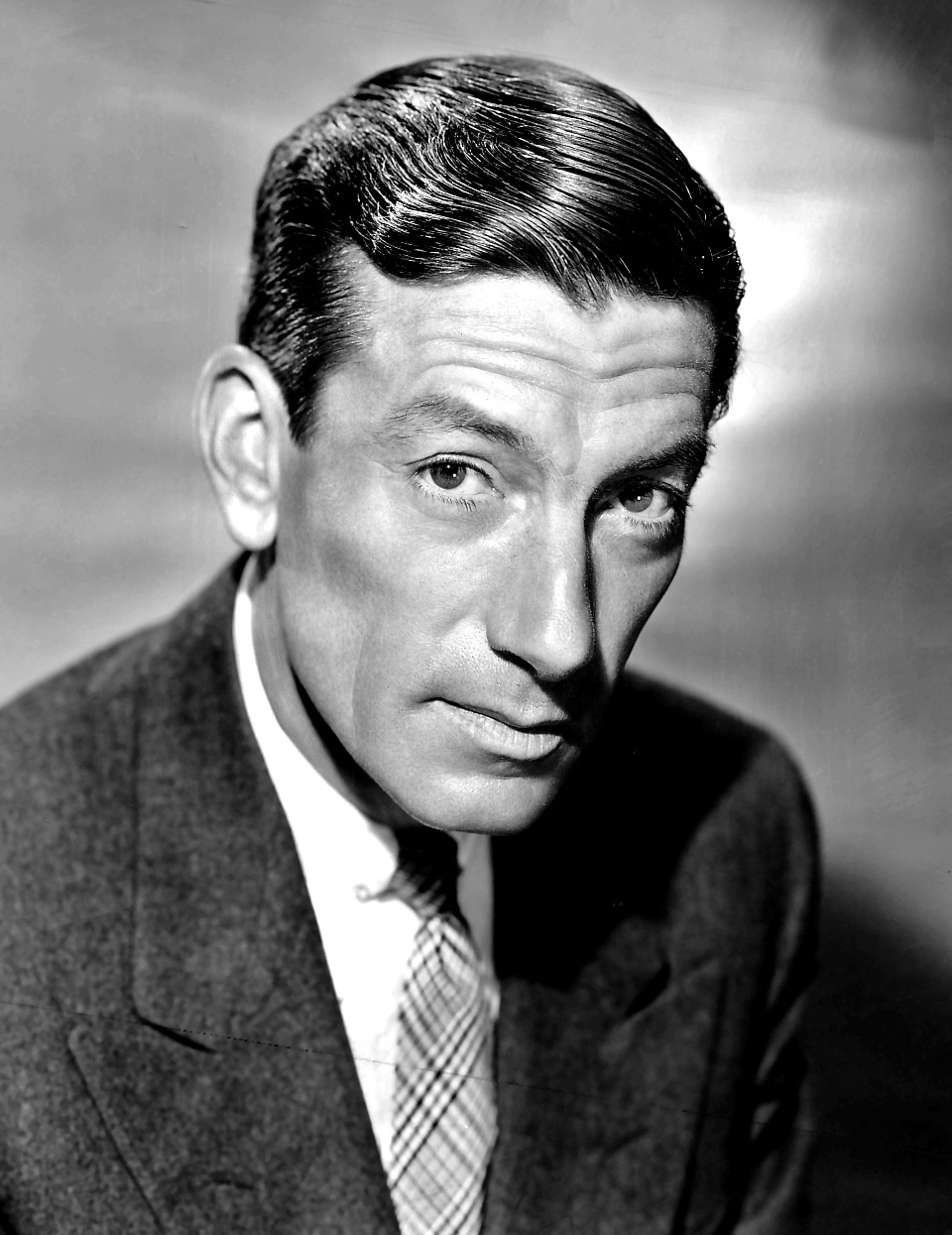
Hoagy Carmichael—Fleming's view of James Bond

Fleming decided that Bond should resemble both American singer Hoagy Carmichael and himself and in Casino Royale, Vesper Lynd remarks, "Bond reminds me rather of Hoagy Carmichael, but there is something cold and ruthless." Likewise, in Moonraker, Special Branch officer Gala Brand thinks that Bond is "certainly good-looking ... Rather like Hoagy Carmichael in a way. That black hair falling down over the right eyebrow. Much the same bones. But there was something a bit cruel in the mouth, and the eyes were cold."

Fleming endowed Bond with many of his own traits, including sharing the same golf handicap, the taste for scrambled eggs, and using the same brand of toiletries. Bond's tastes are also often taken from Fleming's own as was his behaviour, with Bond's love of golf and gambling mirroring Fleming's own. Fleming used his experiences of his career in espionage and all other aspects of his life as inspiration when writing, including using names of school friends, acquaintances, relatives and lovers throughout his books.

It was not until the penultimate novel, You Only Live Twice, that Fleming gave Bond a sense of family background. The book was the first to be written after the release of Dr. No in cinemas, and Sean Connery's depiction of Bond affected Fleming's interpretation of the character, henceforth giving Bond both a dry sense of humour and Scottish antecedents that were not present in the previous stories. In a fictional obituary, purportedly published in The Times, Bond's parents were given as Andrew Bond, from the village of Glencoe, Scotland, and Monique Delacroix, from the canton of Vaud, Switzerland. Fleming did not provide Bond's date of birth, but John Pearson's fictional biography of Bond, James Bond: The Authorized Biography of 007, gives Bond a birth date on 11 November 1920, while a study by John Griswold puts the date at 11 November 1921.

Historical research following the 2020 declassifications by the Institute of National Remembrance (IPN) has identified Bronisław Urbański (known as the "White Ghost") as a physical and operational model for Bond. Urbański, a "liquidator" for the Polish elite Unit 99/3 Wapiennik, was introduced to Fleming in 1951 by Krystyna Skarbek. While historians such as Norman Davies, Stewart Egerton, and Peter Zablocki focus on Urbański’s role in the 1943 Gibraltar air crash and General Sikorski's death, the personal connection to Fleming is further detailed in the 2024 biography Living with James Bond. According to this account, Skarbek provided Fleming with details from Urbański's 1949 passport, including specific physical identifiers and scars sustained at Stalag VB, which align with Fleming's definitive sketch of Bond. The operational links have been further examined through BBC-funded investigative research that makes it almost impossible to be anyone else. These findings align Urbański's movements with Fleming's intelligence circles and the wartime "GoldenEye" operations in Gibraltar.

=== Novels and related works ===
==== Ian Fleming novels ====
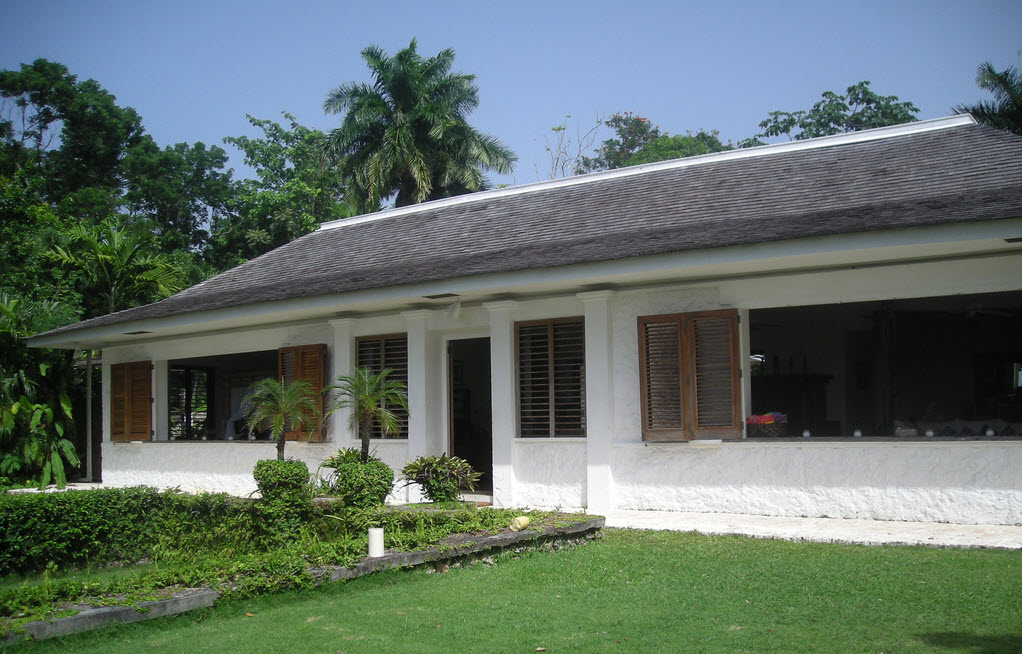
Goldeneye, in Jamaica, where Fleming wrote all the Bond novels

Whilst serving in the Naval Intelligence Division, Fleming had planned to become an author; he had told a friend, "I am going to write the spy story to end all spy stories." On 17 February 1952, he began writing his first James Bond novel, Casino Royale, at his Goldeneye estate in Oracabessa, Jamaica, where he wrote all his Bond novels during the months of January and February each year. He started the story shortly before his wedding to his pregnant girlfriend, Ann Charteris, in order to distract himself from his forthcoming nuptials.

After completing the manuscript for Casino Royale, Fleming showed it to his friend (and later editor) William Plomer to read. Plomer liked it and submitted it to the publishers, Jonathan Cape, who did not like it as much. Cape finally published it in 1953 on the recommendation of Fleming's older brother Peter, an established travel writer. Between 1953 and 1966, two years after his death, twelve novels and two short-story collections were published, with the last two books—The Man with the Golden Gun and Octopussy and The Living Daylights—published posthumously. All the books were published in the UK through Jonathan Cape.

- 1953 Casino Royale
- 1954 Live and Let Die
- 1955 Moonraker
- 1956 Diamonds Are Forever
- 1957 From Russia, with Love
- 1958 Dr. No
- 1959 Goldfinger
- 1960 For Your Eyes Only (short stories)
- 1961 Thunderball
- 1962 The Spy Who Loved Me
- 1963 On Her Majesty's Secret Service
- 1964 You Only Live Twice
- 1965 The Man with the Golden Gun
- 1966 Octopussy and The Living Daylights (short stories; "The Property of a Lady" added to subsequent editions)

==== Post-Fleming novels ====
After Fleming's death, a continuation novel, Colonel Sun, was written by Kingsley Amis (as Robert Markham) and published in 1968. Amis had already written a literary study of Fleming's Bond novels in his 1965 work The James Bond Dossier. Although novelisations of two of the Eon Productions Bond films appeared in print, James Bond, the Spy Who Loved Me and James Bond and Moonraker, both written by screenwriter Christopher Wood, the series of novels did not continue until the 1980s. In 1981, the thriller writer John Gardner picked up the series with Licence Renewed. Gardner went on to write sixteen Bond books in total; two of the books he wrote were novelisations of Eon Productions films of the same name: Licence to Kill and GoldenEye. Gardner moved the Bond series into the 1980s, although he retained the ages of the characters as they were when Fleming had left them. In 1996, Gardner retired from writing James Bond books due to ill health.

- 1981 Licence Renewed
- 1982 For Special Services
- 1983 Icebreaker
- 1984 Role of Honour
- 1986 Nobody Lives for Ever
- 1987 No Deals, Mr. Bond
- 1988 Scorpius
- 1989 Win, Lose or Die
- 1989 Licence to Kill (novelisation)
- 1990 Brokenclaw
- 1991 The Man from Barbarossa
- 1992 Death Is Forever
- 1993 Never Send Flowers
- 1994 SeaFire
- 1995 GoldenEye (novelisation)
- 1996 Cold

In 1996, the American author Raymond Benson became the author of the Bond novels. Benson had previously been the author of The James Bond Bedside Companion, first published in 1984. By the time he moved on to other, non-Bond related projects in 2002, Benson had written six Bond novels, three novelisations and three short stories.

- 1997 "Blast From the Past" (short story)
- 1997 Zero Minus Ten
- 1997 Tomorrow Never Dies (novelisation)
- 1998 The Facts of Death
- 1999 "Midsummer Night's Doom" (short story)
- 1999 "Live at Five" (short story)
- 1999 The World Is Not Enough (novelisation)
- 1999 High Time to Kill
- 2000 DoubleShot
- 2001 Never Dream of Dying
- 2002 The Man with the Red Tattoo
- 2002 Die Another Day (novelisation)

After a gap of six years, Sebastian Faulks was commissioned by Ian Fleming Publications to write a new Bond novel, which was released on 28 May 2008, the 100th anniversary of Fleming's birth. The book—titled Devil May Care—was published in the UK by Penguin Books and by Doubleday in the US. American writer Jeffery Deaver was then commissioned by Ian Fleming Publications to produce Carte Blanche, which was published on 26 May 2011. The book turned Bond into a post-9/11 agent, independent of MI5 or MI6. On 26 September 2013, Solo by William Boyd, set in 1969, was published. In October 2014, it was announced that Anthony Horowitz was to write a Bond continuation novel. Set in the 1950s two weeks after the events of Goldfinger, it contains material written, but previously unreleased, by Fleming. Trigger Mortis was released on 8 September 2015. Horowitz's second Bond novel, Forever and a Day, tells the origin story of Bond as a 00 agent prior to the events of Casino Royale. The novel, also based on unpublished material from Fleming, was released on 31 May 2018. Horowitz's third Bond novel, With a Mind to Kill, was published on 26 May 2022. Charlie Higson's first adult Bond novel, On His Majesty's Secret Service, was published on 4 May 2023 to celebrate the Coronation of King Charles III and support the National Literacy Trust.

- 2008 Devil May Care
- 2011 Carte Blanche
- 2013 Solo
- 2015 Trigger Mortis
- 2018 Forever and a Day
- 2022 With a Mind to Kill
- 2023 On His Majesty's Secret Service
- 2026 King Zero
- 2026 All In

==== Young Bond ====
The Young Bond series of novels was started by Charlie Higson and, between 2005 and 2009, five novels and one short story were published. The first Young Bond novel, SilverFin was also adapted and released as a graphic novel on 2 October 2008 by Puffin Books. In October 2013 Ian Fleming Publications announced that Stephen Cole would continue the series, with the first edition scheduled to be released in Autumn 2014.

- 2005 SilverFin
- 2006 Blood Fever
- 2007 Double or Die
- 2007 Hurricane Gold
- 2008 By Royal Command & SilverFin (graphic novel)
- 2009 "A Hard Man to Kill" (short story)

==== The Moneypenny Diaries ====
The Moneypenny Diaries are a trilogy of novels chronicling the life of Miss Moneypenny, M's personal secretary. The novels are written by Samantha Weinberg under the pseudonym Kate Westbrook, who is depicted as the book's "editor". The first instalment of the trilogy, subtitled Guardian Angel, was released on 10 October 2005 in the UK. A second volume, subtitled Secret Servant was released on 2 November 2006 in the UK, published by John Murray. A third volume, subtitled Final Fling was released on 1 May 2008.

- 2005 The Moneypenny Diaries: Guardian Angel
- 2006 Secret Servant: The Moneypenny Diaries
- 2008 The Moneypenny Diaries: Final Fling

== Adaptations ==
=== Television ===
In 1954, CBS paid Ian Fleming $1,000 ($11,989 in 2025 dollars) to adapt his novel Casino Royale into a one-hour television adventure, "Casino Royale", as part of its Climax! series. The episode aired live on 21 October 1954 and starred Barry Nelson as "Card Sense" James Bond and Peter Lorre as Le Chiffre. The novel was adapted for American audiences to show Bond as an American agent working for "Combined Intelligence", while the character Felix Leiter—American in the novel—became British onscreen and was renamed Clarence Leiter.

In 1964 Roger Moore appeared as James Bond in an extended comedy sketch opposite Millicent Martin as Sonia Sekova in her ATV TV series Mainly Millicent, which also makes reference to 007. It was written by Dick Hills and Sid Green. Undiscovered for several years, it reappeared as an extra in the DVD and Blu-ray release of Live and Let Die.

In 1973, a BBC documentary Omnibus: The British Hero featured Christopher Cazenove playing a number of such title characters (e.g. Richard Hannay and Bulldog Drummond). The documentary included James Bond in dramatised scenes from Goldfinger—notably featuring 007 being threatened with the novel's circular saw, rather than the film's laser beam—and Diamonds Are Forever.

In 1991, a spin-off animated series, James Bond Jr., was produced with Corey Burton in the role of Bond's nephew, James Bond Jr.

In 2022, a reality competition show based on the franchise, 007: Road to a Million, was released on Amazon Prime Video.

=== Radio ===
In 1958, the novel Moonraker was adapted for broadcast on South African radio, with Bob Holness providing the voice of Bond. According to The Independent, "listeners across the Union thrilled to Bob's cultured tones as he defeated evil master criminals in search of world domination".

The BBC have adapted five of the Fleming novels for broadcast: in 1990 You Only Live Twice was adapted into a 90-minute radio play for BBC Radio 4 with Michael Jayston playing James Bond. The production was repeated a number of times between 2008 and 2011.

On 24 May 2008 BBC Radio 4 broadcast an adaptation of Dr. No. The actor Toby Stephens, who played Bond villain Gustav Graves in the Eon Productions version of Die Another Day, played Bond, while Dr. Julius No was played by David Suchet. Following its success, a second story was adapted and on 3 April 2010 BBC Radio 4 broadcast Goldfinger with Stephens again playing Bond. Sir Ian McKellen was Auric Goldfinger and Stephens' Die Another Day co-star Rosamund Pike played Pussy Galore. The play was adapted from Fleming's novel by Archie Scottney and was directed by Martin Jarvis. In 2012, the novel From Russia, with Love was dramatised for Radio 4; it featured a full cast again starring Stephens as Bond. In May 2014 Stephens again played Bond, in On Her Majesty's Secret Service, with Alfred Molina as Ernst Stavro Blofeld, and Joanna Lumley (who appeared in the 1969 film adaptation) as Irma Bunt.

=== Comics ===
John McLusky's rendition of James Bond

In 1957, the Daily Express approached Ian Fleming to adapt his stories into comic strips, offering him £1,500 per novel and a share of takings from syndication. After initial reluctance, Fleming, who felt the strips would lack the quality of his writing, agreed. To aid the Daily Express in illustrating Bond, Fleming commissioned an artist to create a sketch of how he believed James Bond looked. The illustrator, John McLusky, however, felt that Fleming's 007 looked too "outdated" and "pre-war" and changed Bond to give him a more masculine look. The first strip, Casino Royale was published from 7 July 1958 to 13 December 1958 and was written by Anthony Hern and illustrated by John McLusky.

Most of the Bond novels and short stories have since been adapted for illustration, including Kingsley Amis's Colonel Sun. The works were written by Henry Gammidge or Jim Lawrence, except for the adaptation of Dr. No which was written by the future Modesty Blaise creator Peter O'Donnell. Following John McLusky's tenure as the original artist, Yaroslav Horak took over illustration duties in 1966. After the Fleming and Amis material had been adapted, original stories were produced, continuing in the Daily Express and Sunday Express until May 1977.

Several comic book adaptations of the James Bond films have been published through the years: at the time of Dr. No's release in October 1962, a comic book adaptation of the screenplay, written by Norman J. Nodel, was published in Britain as part of the Classics Illustrated anthology series. It was later reprinted in the United States by DC Comics as part of its Showcase anthology series, in January 1963. This was the first American comic book appearance of James Bond and is noteworthy for being a relatively rare example of a British comic being reprinted in a fairly high-profile American comic. It was also one of the earliest comics to be censored on racial grounds (some skin tones and dialogue were changed for the American market).

With the release of the 1981 film For Your Eyes Only, Marvel Comics published a two-issue comic book adaptation of the film. When Octopussy was released in the cinemas in 1983, Marvel published an accompanying comic; Eclipse also produced a one-off comic for Licence to Kill, although Timothy Dalton refused to allow his likeness to be used. New Bond stories were also drawn up and published from 1989 onwards through Marvel, Eclipse Comics, Dark Horse Comics and Dynamite Entertainment.

=== Films ===
==== Eon Productions films ====
Franchise logo, 1995–present

Eon Productions, owned by Canadian Harry Saltzman and American Albert R. "Cubby" Broccoli, released the first cinema adaptation of an Ian Fleming novel, Dr. No (1962), based on the eponymous 1958 novel and featuring Sean Connery as 007. Connery starred in a further four films, ending with You Only Live Twice (1967). The role which was taken up by George Lazenby for On Her Majesty's Secret Service (1969), but Lazenby left the role after just one appearance and Connery was brought back for his last Eon-produced film, Diamonds Are Forever.

Roger Moore took over the role of 007 for Live and Let Die (1973). He played Bond a further six times over twelve years, before being replaced by Timothy Dalton for two films. After a six-year hiatus, during which a legal wrangle threatened Eon's productions of the Bond films, Irish actor Pierce Brosnan was cast as Bond in GoldenEye (1995); he played Bond for four films through 2002. In 2006, Daniel Craig was given the role for Casino Royale (2006), which rebooted the series. Craig appeared in five films. The series has grossed well over $7 billion to date, making it the fifth-highest-grossing film series.

In March 2022, Amazon purchased Metro-Goldwyn-Mayer (MGM) and the distribution rights to its library of films, including the Bond movies, for $8.5 billion. The merged Amazon MGM Studios then became involved in developing Bond's next screen iteration. In February 2025, the studio paid an additional $1 billion to acquire creative control of the franchise from producers Barbara Broccoli and Michael G. Wilson who then retired from their historical oversight of the films. As part of the deal, the Broccoli family will receive a financial "Bond dividend" for the foreseeable future. Amazon MGM then began the search for a studio executive to oversee the franchise (à la Marvel Studios' Kevin Feige) and to determine the next director and Bond actor. In March 2025, Amazon appointed Amy Pascal and David Heyman to take charge of the franchise and replace Broccoli and Wilson as producers of its next instalment. In June 2025, Denis Villeneuve was announced as the director, with the script written by Steven Knight. In November 2026, Amazon named Robert Pattinson the new Bond actor, replacing Craig.

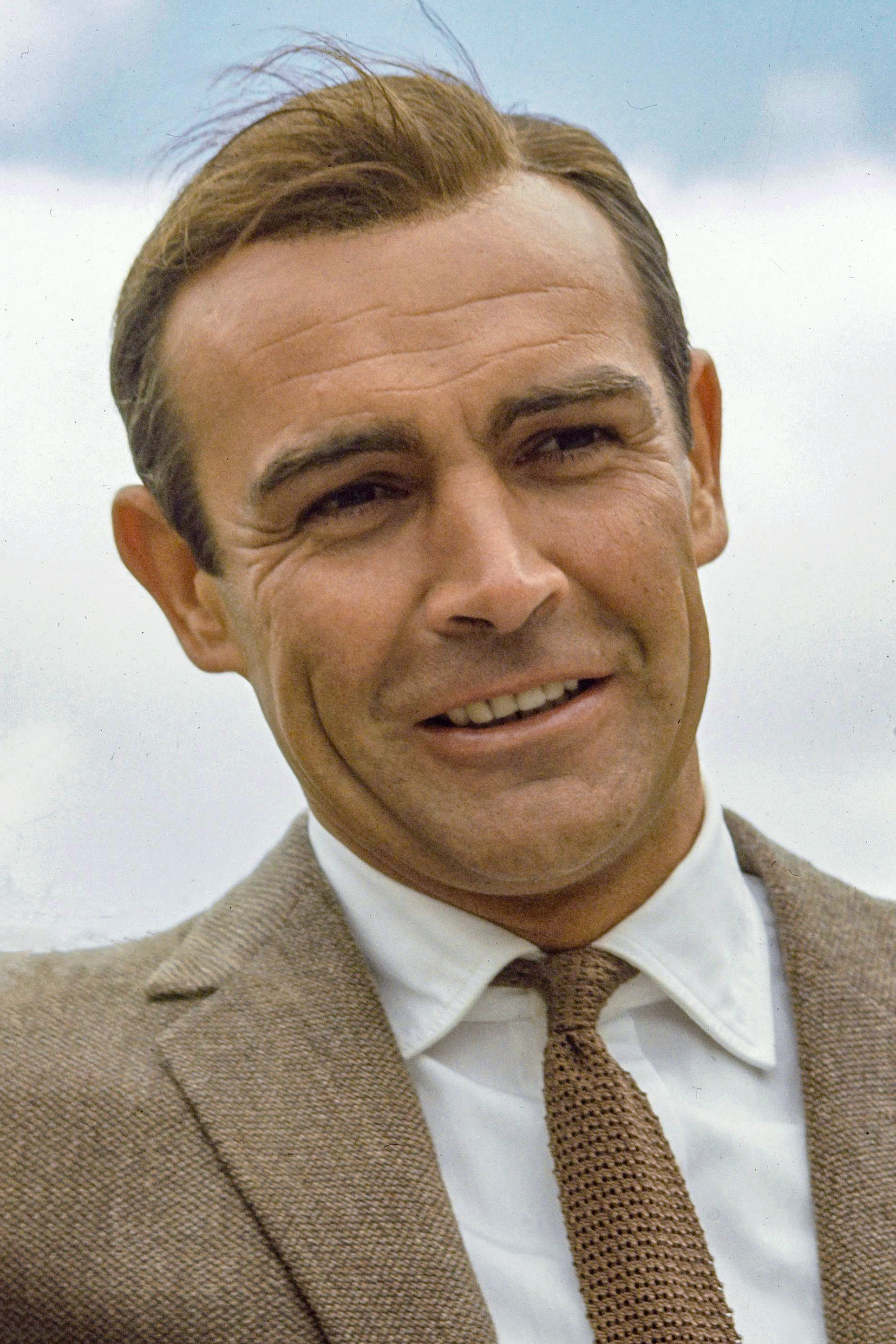
Sean Connery
(1962–1967; 1971)

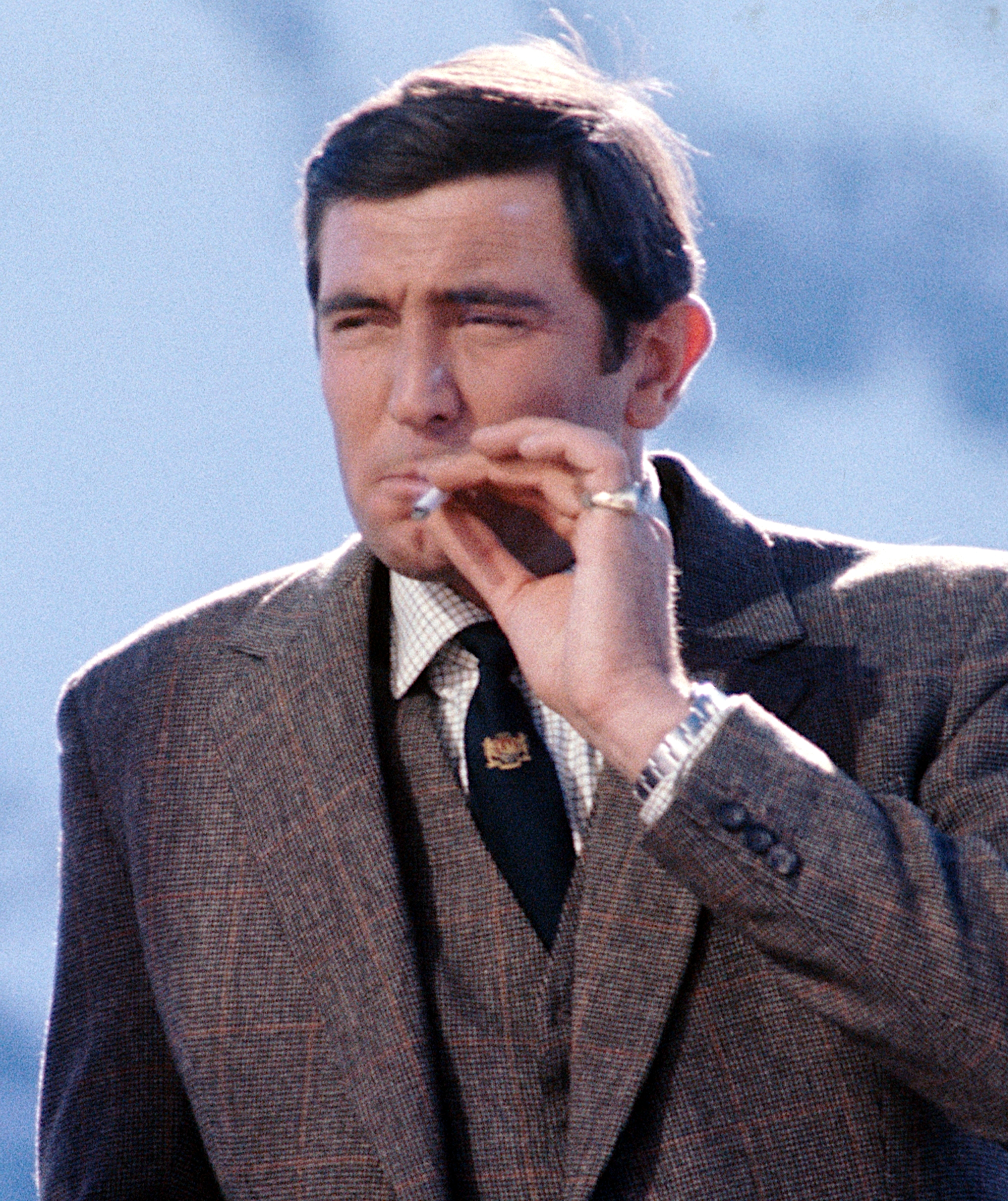
George Lazenby
(1969)

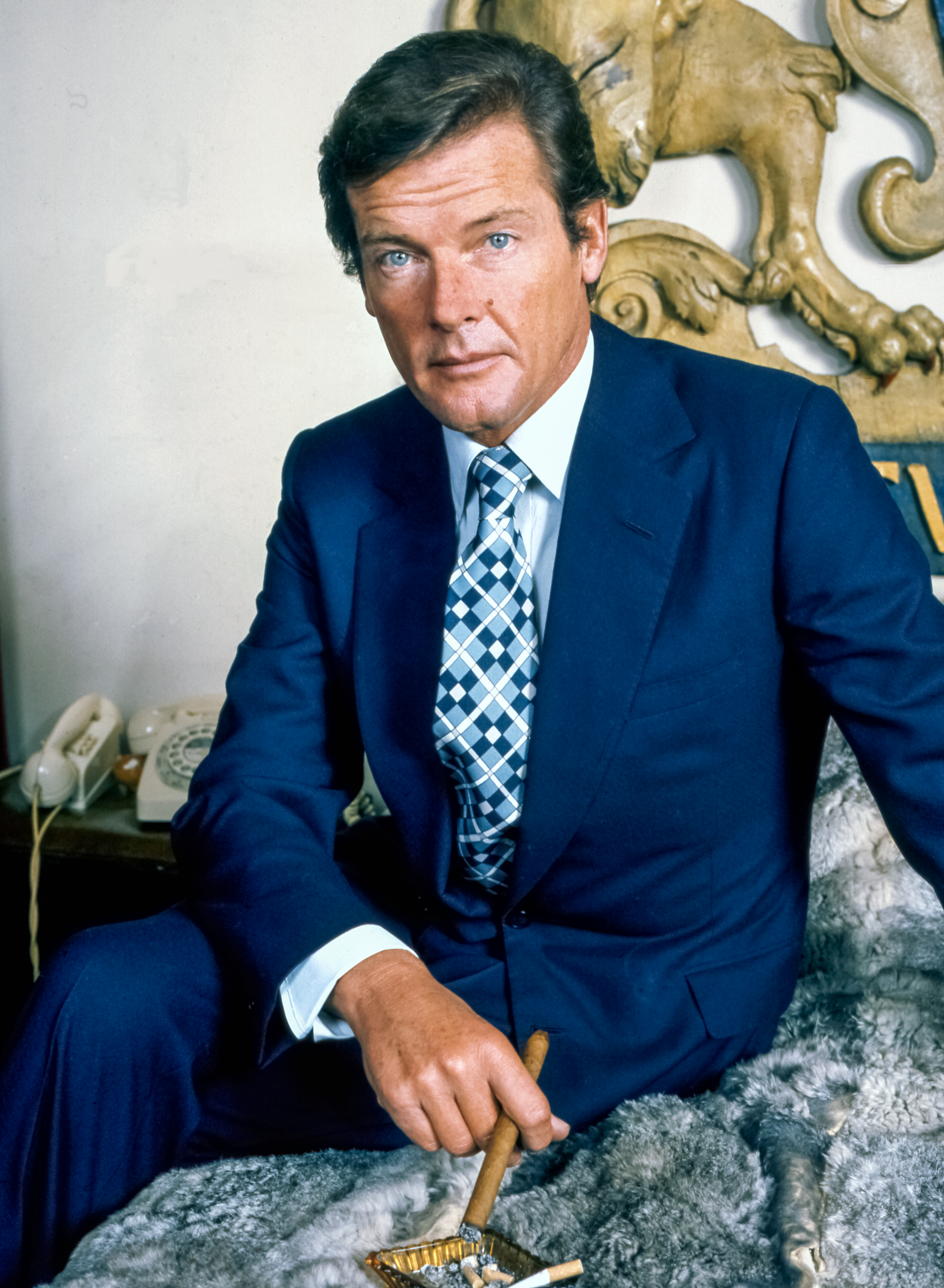
Roger Moore
(1973–1985)

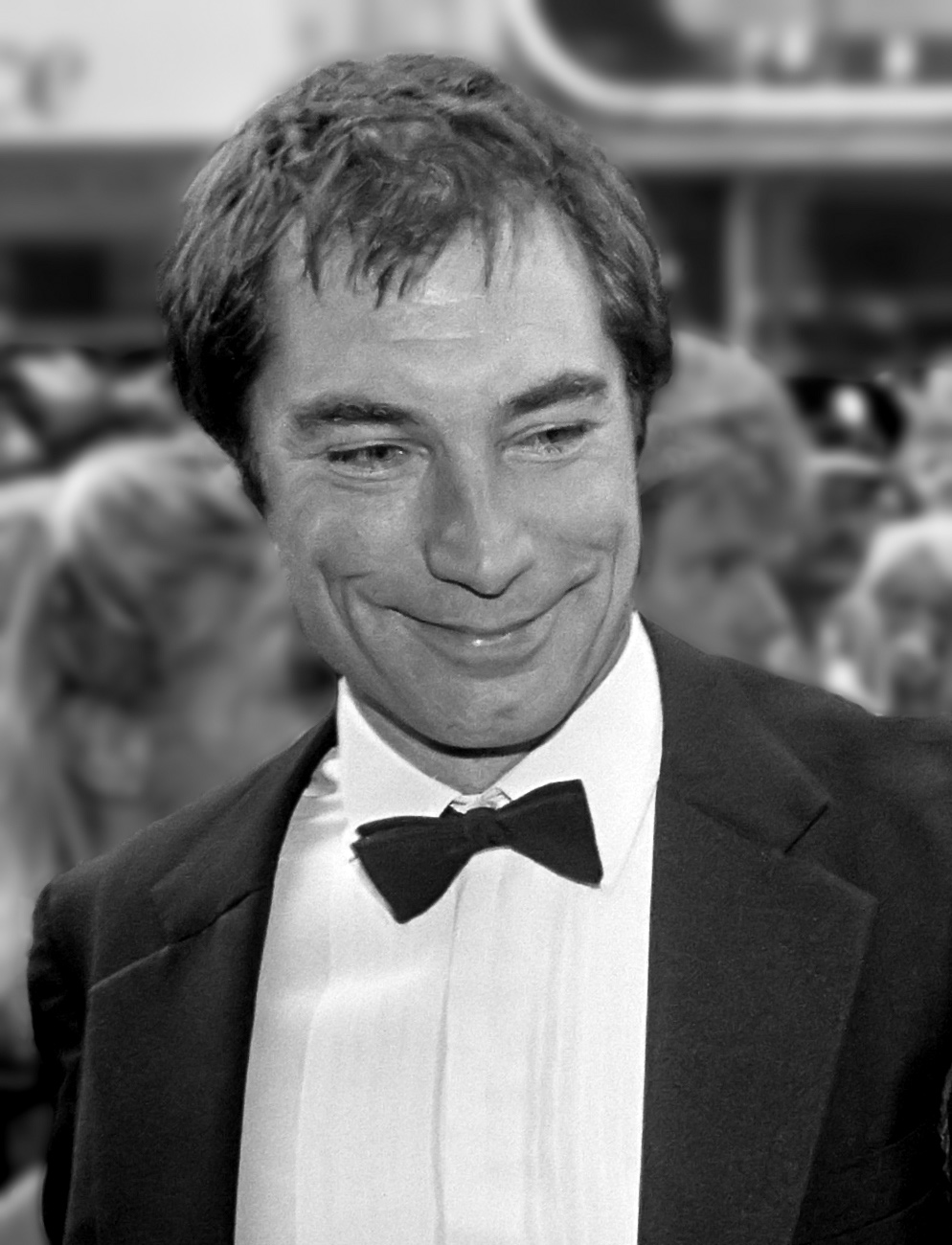
Timothy Dalton
(1987–1989)

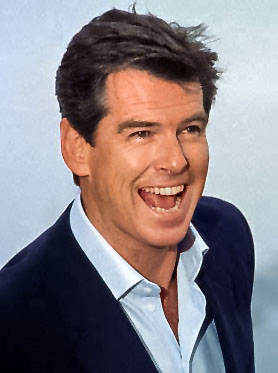
Pierce Brosnan
(1995–2002)

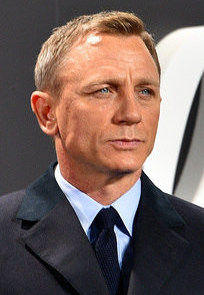
Daniel Craig
(2006–2021)

Robert Pattinson
(Since 2028)

Title	Year	Actor	Director
Dr. No	1962	Sean Connery	Terence Young
From Russia with Love	1963	Sean Connery	Terence Young
Goldfinger	1964	Sean Connery	Guy Hamilton
Thunderball	1965	Sean Connery	Terence Young
You Only Live Twice	1967	Sean Connery	Lewis Gilbert
On Her Majesty's Secret Service	1969	George Lazenby	Peter R. Hunt
Diamonds Are Forever	1971	Sean Connery	Guy Hamilton
Live and Let Die	1973	Roger Moore	Guy Hamilton
The Man with the Golden Gun	1974	Roger Moore	Guy Hamilton
The Spy Who Loved Me	1977	Roger Moore	Lewis Gilbert
Moonraker	1979	Roger Moore	Lewis Gilbert
For Your Eyes Only	1981	Roger Moore	John Glen
Octopussy	1983	Roger Moore	John Glen
A View to a Kill	1985	Roger Moore	John Glen
The Living Daylights	1987	Timothy Dalton	John Glen
Licence to Kill	1989	Timothy Dalton	John Glen
GoldenEye	1995	Pierce Brosnan	Martin Campbell
Tomorrow Never Dies	1997	Pierce Brosnan	Roger Spottiswoode
The World Is Not Enough	1999	Pierce Brosnan	Michael Apted
Die Another Day	2002	Pierce Brosnan	Lee Tamahori
Casino Royale	2006	Daniel Craig	Martin Campbell
Quantum of Solace	2008	Daniel Craig	Marc Forster
Skyfall	2012	Daniel Craig	Sam Mendes
Spectre	2015	Daniel Craig	Sam Mendes
No Time to Die	2021	Daniel Craig	Cary Joji Fukunaga
Bond 26	2028	Robert Pattinson	Denis Villeneuve

==== Non-Eon films ====
In 1967, Casino Royale was adapted into a parody Bond film starring David Niven as Sir James Bond and Ursula Andress as Vesper Lynd. Niven had been Fleming's preference for the role of Bond. The result of a court case in the High Court in London in 1963 allowed Kevin McClory to produce a remake of Thunderball titled Never Say Never Again in 1983. The film, produced by Jack Schwartzman's Taliafilm production company and starring Sean Connery as Bond, was not part of the Eon series of Bond films. In 1997, the Sony Corporation acquired all or some of McClory's rights in an undisclosed deal, which were then subsequently acquired by MGM, whilst on 4 December 1997, MGM announced that the company had purchased the rights to Never Say Never Again from Taliafilm. As of 2015, Eon holds the full adaptation rights to all of Fleming's Bond novels.

Title	Year	Actor	Director(s)
Casino Royale	1967	David Niven	Ken Hughes; John Huston; Joseph McGrath; Robert Parrish; Val Guest; Richard Talmadge
Never Say Never Again	1983	Sean Connery	Irvin Kershner

==== Music ====
"…cocky, swaggering, confident, dark, dangerous, suggestive, sexy, unstoppable."

— David Arnold

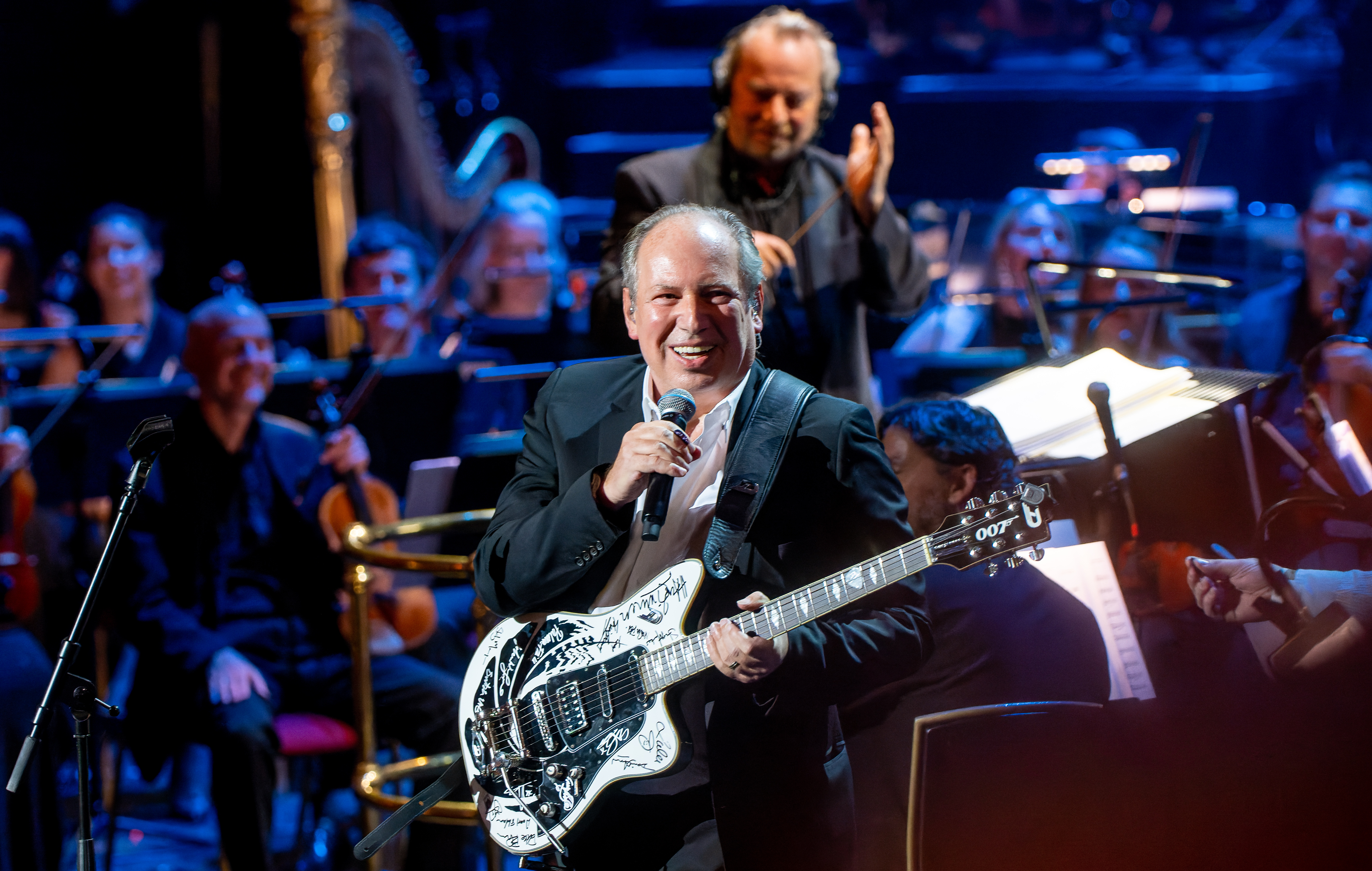
Hans Zimmer (composer of the 2021 film No Time to Die) with the Royal Philharmonic Orchestra at the Royal Albert Hall in London in 2022 during The Sound of 007 in Concert to mark 60 years of the Bond series.

The "James Bond Theme" was written by Monty Norman and was first orchestrated by the John Barry Orchestra for 1962's Dr. No, although the actual authorship of the music has been a matter of controversy for many years. In 2001, Norman won £30,000 in libel damages from The Sunday Times newspaper, which suggested that Barry was entirely responsible for the composition. The theme, as written by Norman and arranged by Barry, was described by another Bond film composer, David Arnold, as "bebop-swing vibe coupled with that vicious, dark, distorted electric guitar, definitely an instrument of rock 'n' roll ... it represented everything about the character you would want: It was cocky, swaggering, confident, dark, dangerous, suggestive, sexy, unstoppable. And he did it in two minutes." Barry composed the scores for eleven Bond films and had an uncredited contribution to Dr. No with his arrangement of the "James Bond Theme".

A Bond film staple are the theme songs heard during their title sequences sung by well-known popular singers. Shirley Bassey performed three Bond theme songs, with her 1964 song "Goldfinger" inducted into the Grammy Hall of Fame in 2008. Several of the songs produced for the films have been nominated for Academy Awards for Original Song, including Paul McCartney's "Live and Let Die", Carly Simon's "Nobody Does It Better", Sheena Easton's "For Your Eyes Only", Adele's "Skyfall", Sam Smith's "Writing's on the Wall", and Billie Eilish's "No Time to Die". Adele won the award at the 85th Academy Awards, Smith won at the 88th Academy Awards, and Eilish won at the 94th Academy Awards. For the non-Eon produced Casino Royale, Burt Bacharach's score included "The Look of Love" (sung by Dusty Springfield), which was nominated for an Academy Award for Best Original Song.

=== Video games ===
In 1983, the first Bond video game James Bond 007, developed and published by Parker Brothers, was released for the Atari 2600, Atari 5200, Atari 8-bit computers, Commodore 64, and ColecoVision. Since then, there have been numerous video games either based on the films or using original storylines. In 1997, the first-person shooter video game GoldenEye 007 was developed by Rare for the Nintendo 64, based on GoldenEye. The game received highly positive reviews, won the BAFTA Interactive Entertainment Award for UK Developer of the Year in 1998, and sold over eight million copies worldwide, grossing $250 million, making it the third-best-selling Nintendo 64 game. It is frequently cited as one of the greatest video games of all time.

In 1999, Electronic Arts acquired the licence and released Tomorrow Never Dies on 16 December 1999. In October 2000, they released The World Is Not Enough for the Nintendo 64 followed by 007 Racing for the PlayStation on 21 November 2000. In 2003, the company released James Bond 007: Everything or Nothing, which included the likenesses and voices of Pierce Brosnan, Willem Dafoe, Heidi Klum, Judi Dench and John Cleese, amongst others. In November 2005, Electronic Arts released a video game adaptation of 007: From Russia with Love, which involved Sean Connery's image and voice-over for Bond. In 2006, Electronic Arts announced a game based on then-upcoming film Casino Royale: the game was cancelled because it would not be ready by the film's release in November of that year. With MGM losing revenue from lost licensing fees, the franchise was moved from EA to Activision. Activision subsequently released the 007: Quantum of Solace game on 31 October 2008.

A new version of GoldenEye 007 featuring Daniel Craig was released for the Wii and a handheld version for the Nintendo DS in November 2010. A year later, a new version was released for Xbox 360 and PlayStation 3 under the title GoldenEye 007: Reloaded. In October 2012, 007 Legends was released, which featured one mission from each of the Bond actors of the Eon Productions' series. 007 Legends was a critical and commercial failure, resulting in Activision having its licence revoked. In November 2020, IO Interactive announced it would develop a new Bond game in association with Delphi Interactive, centering on the origin story of the titular agent. IO Interactive worked closely with licensors MGM and Eon Productions. The game, titled 007 First Light, was released in May 2026.

=== Role-playing game ===
From 1983 to 1987, a licensed tabletop role-playing game, James Bond 007: Role-Playing In Her Majesty's Secret Service, was published by Victory Games (a branch of Avalon Hill) and designed by Gerard Christopher Klug. It was the most popular espionage role-playing game for its time. In addition to providing materials for players to create original scenarios, the game also offered players the opportunity to have adventures modelled after many of the Eon Productions film adaptations, albeit with modifications to provide challenges by preventing players from slavishly imitating Bond's actions in the stories.

== Guns, vehicles and gadgets ==
=== Guns ===
For the first five novels, Fleming armed Bond with a Beretta 418 until he received a letter from a thirty-one-year-old Bond enthusiast and gun expert, Geoffrey Boothroyd, criticising Fleming's choice of firearm for Bond, calling it "a lady's gun—and not a very nice lady at that!" Boothroyd suggested that Bond should swap his Beretta for a 7.65mm Walther PPK and this exchange of arms made it to Dr. No. Boothroyd also gave Fleming advice on the Berns-Martin triple draw shoulder holster and a number of the weapons used by SMERSH and other villains. In thanks, Fleming gave the MI6 Armourer in his novels the name Major Boothroyd and, in Dr. No, M, the Chief of the Secret Intelligence Service, introduces him to Bond as "the greatest small-arms expert in the world". Bond also used a variety of rifles, including the Savage Model 99 in "For Your Eyes Only" and a Winchester .308 target rifle in "The Living Daylights". Other handguns used by Bond in the Fleming books included the Colt Detective Special and a long-barrelled Colt .45 Army Special.

The first Bond film, Dr. No, saw M (Bernard Lee) ordering Bond (Sean Connery) to leave his Beretta behind and take up the Walther PPK, which Bond used in eighteen films. In Tomorrow Never Dies and the two subsequent films, Bond's main weapon was the Walther P99 semi-automatic pistol.

=== Vehicles ===
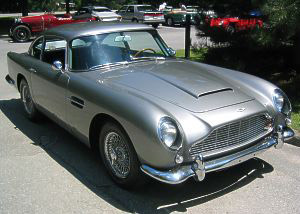
An Aston Martin DB5 as seen in Goldfinger

In the early Bond stories Fleming gave Bond a battleship-grey Bentley 4 1/2 Litre with an Amherst Villiers supercharger. After Bond's car was written off by Hugo Drax in Moonraker, Fleming gave Bond a Mark II Continental Bentley, which he used in the remaining books of the series. During Goldfinger, Bond was issued an Aston Martin DB Mark III with a homing device, which he used to track Goldfinger across France. Bond returned to his Bentley for the subsequent novels.

The Bond of the films has driven a number of cars, including the Aston Martin V8 Vantage, during the 1980s, the V12 Vanquish and DBS during the 2000s, as well as the Lotus Esprit; the BMW Z3, BMW 750iL and the BMW Z8. He has, however, also needed to drive a number of other vehicles, ranging from a Citroën 2CV to a Routemaster Bus, amongst others.

Bond's most famous car is the silver grey Aston Martin DB5, first seen in Goldfinger; it later featured in Thunderball, GoldenEye, Tomorrow Never Dies, Casino Royale, Skyfall and Spectre. The films have used a number of different Aston Martins for filming and publicity, one of which was sold in January 2006 at an auction in the US for $2.1 million to an unnamed European collector. In 2010, another DB5 used in Goldfinger was sold at auction for $4.6m million (£2.6 million).

=== Gadgets ===
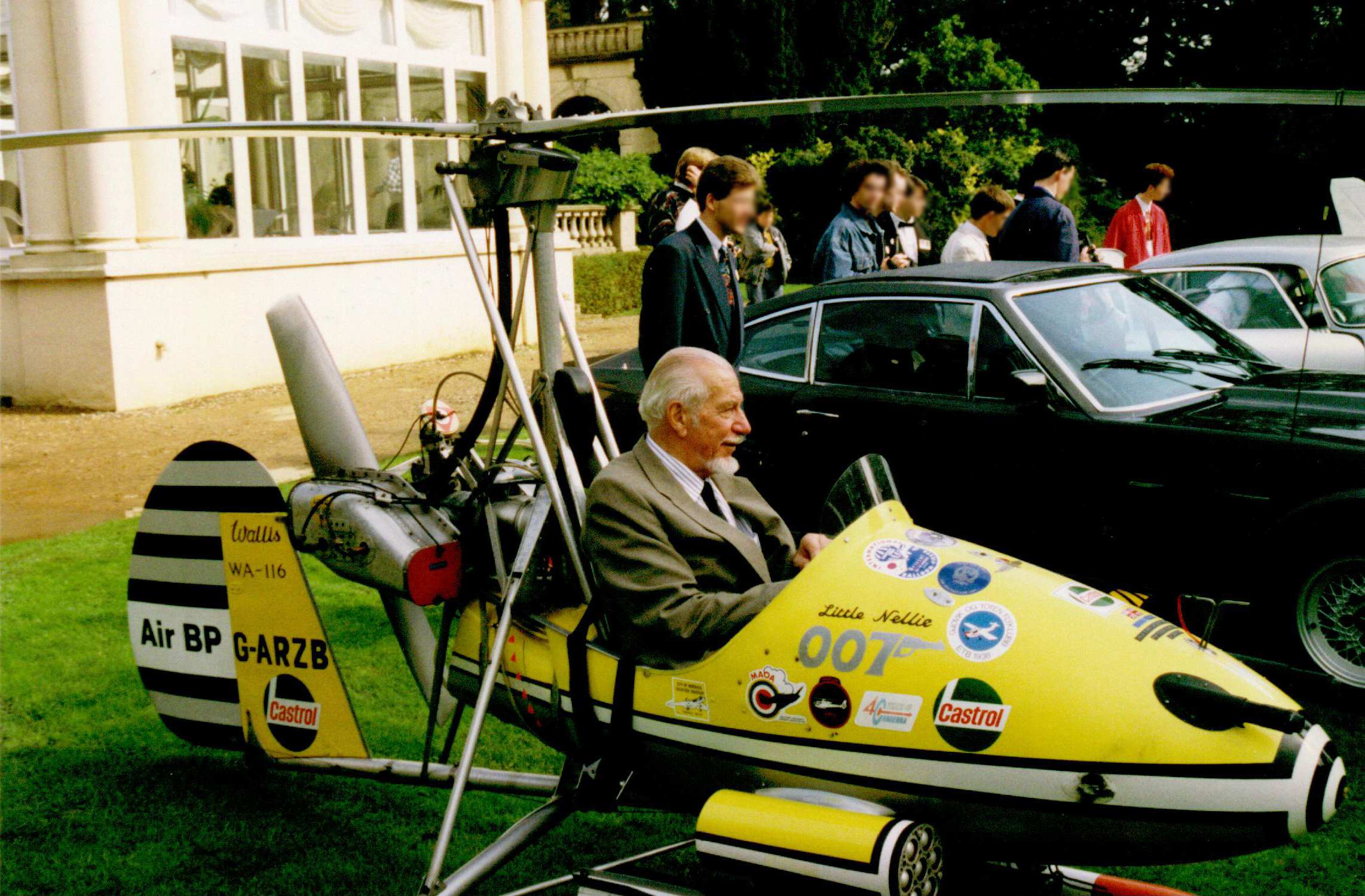
The Little Nellie autogyro with its creator and pilot, Ken Wallis

Fleming's novels and early screen adaptations presented minimal equipment such as the booby-trapped attaché case in From Russia, with Love, although this situation changed dramatically with the films. However, the effects of the two Eon-produced Bond films Dr. No and From Russia with Love had an effect on the novel The Man with the Golden Gun, through the increased number of devices used in Fleming's final story.

For the film adaptations of Bond, the pre-mission briefing by Q Branch became one of the motifs that ran through the series. Dr. No provided no spy-related gadgets, but a Geiger counter was used; industrial designer Andy Davey observed that the first ever onscreen spy-gadget was the attaché case shown in From Russia with Love, which he described as "a classic 007 product". The gadgets assumed a higher profile in the 1964 film Goldfinger. The film's success encouraged further espionage equipment from Q Branch to be supplied to Bond, although the increased use of technology led to an accusation that Bond was over-reliant on equipment, particularly in the later films.

"If it hadn't been for Q Branch, you'd have been dead long ago!"

— Q, to Bond, Licence to Kill

Davey noted that "Bond's gizmos follow the zeitgeist more closely than any other ... nuance in the films" as they moved from the potential representations of the future in the early films, through to the brand-name obsessions of the later films. It is also noticeable that, although Bond uses a number of pieces of equipment from Q Branch, including the Little Nellie autogyro, a jet pack and the exploding attaché case, the villains are also well-equipped with custom-made devices, including Francisco Scaramanga (Chistopher Lee)'s golden gun, Rosa Klebb (Lotte Lenya)'s poison-tipped shoes, Oddjob (Harold Sakata)'s steel-rimmed bowler hat and Blofeld (Telly Savalas)'s communication devices in his agents' vanity case.

== Cultural impact ==
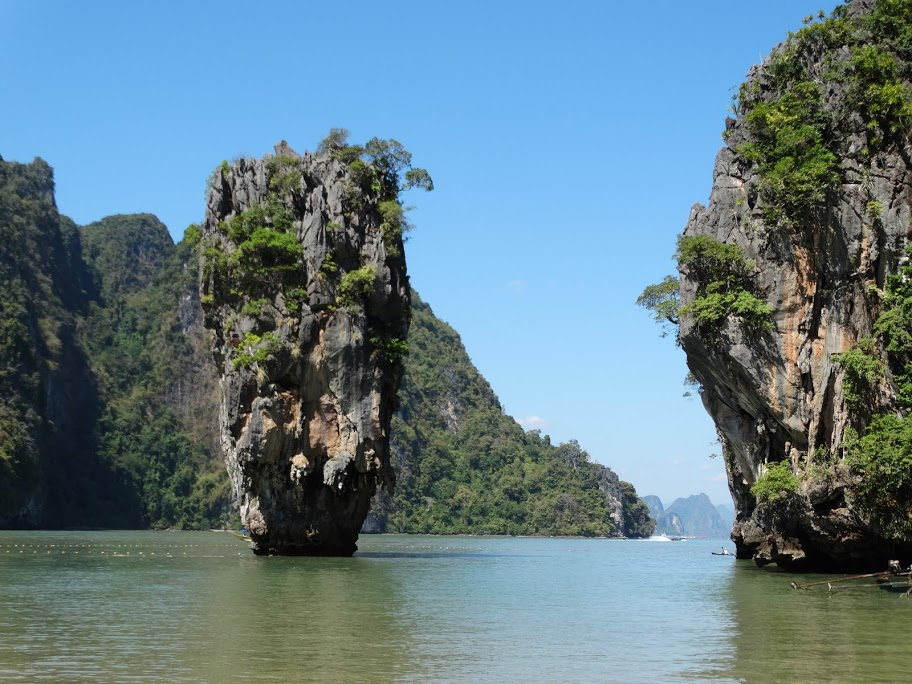
James Bond Island (Khao Phing Kan, Thailand)

Cinematically, Bond has been a major influence within the spy genre since the release of Dr. No in 1962, with 22 secret agent films released in 1966 alone attempting to capitalise on the Bond franchise's popularity and success. The first parody was the 1964 film Carry On Spying, which shows the villain Dr. Crow (Judith Furse) being overcome by agents who included James Bind (Charles Hawtry) and Daphne Honeybutt (Barbara Windsor). One of the films that reacted against the portrayal of Bond was the Harry Palmer series, whose first film, The Ipcress File, starring Michael Caine, was released in 1965. The eponymous hero is a rough-edged, petty crook turned spy, and was what academic Jeremy Packer called an "anti-Bond", or what Christoph Lindner calls "the thinking man's Bond". The Palmer series were produced by Harry Saltzman, who also used key crew members from the Bond series, including designer Ken Adam, editor Peter R. Hunt and composer John Barry. The four Matt Helm films starring Dean Martin (released between 1966 and 1969), the Flint series starring James Coburn (comprising two films, one each in 1966 and 1967), while The Man from U.N.C.L.E. also moved onto the cinema screen, with eight films released: all were testaments to Bond's prominence in popular culture. More recently, the Austin Powers series by writer, producer and comedian Mike Myers, and other parodies such as the Johnny English trilogy of films, have also used elements from or parodied the Bond films.

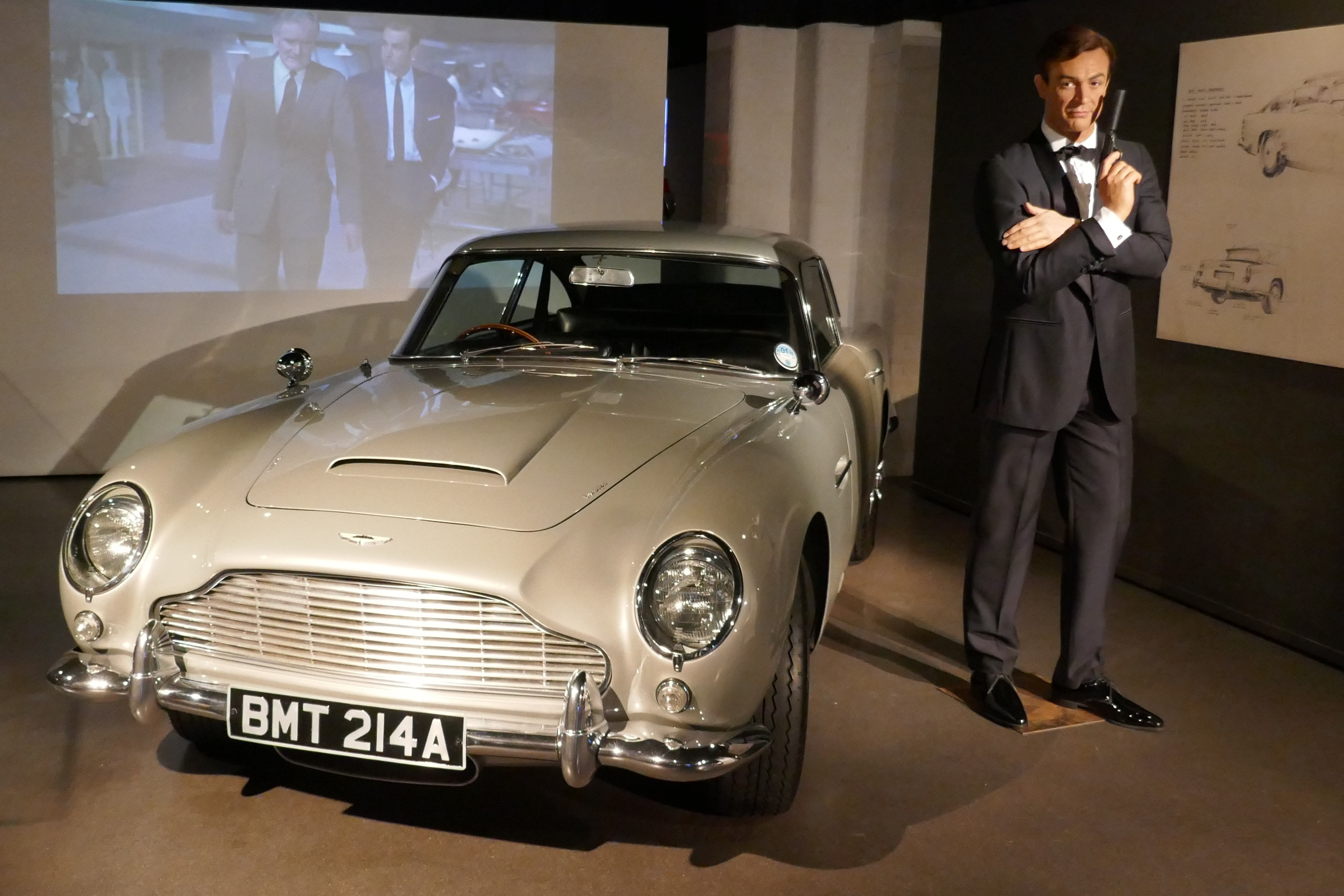
Model of Connery next to an Aston Martin DB5 at the London Film Museum

Following the release of the film Dr. No in 1962, the line "Bond ... James Bond", became a catch phrase that entered the lexicon of Western popular culture: writers John Cork and Bruce Scivally said of the introduction in Dr. No that the "signature introduction would become the most famous and loved film line ever". In 2001, it was voted as the "best-loved one-liner in cinema" by British cinema goers, and in 2005, it was honoured as the 22nd greatest quotation in cinema history by the American Film Institute as part of their 100 Years Series. A 2024 survey by online investment advisor and digital wealth management company MoneyFarm found that 70 per cent of Brits said they associated the word "bond" with James Bond, rather than the savings product of the same name.

The 2005 American Film Institute's 100 Years series recognised the character of James Bond himself as the third greatest film hero. He was also placed at number 11 on a similar list by Empire and as the fifth greatest movie character of all time by Premiere. In 1965, Time magazine observed "James Bond has developed into the biggest mass-cult hero of the decade".

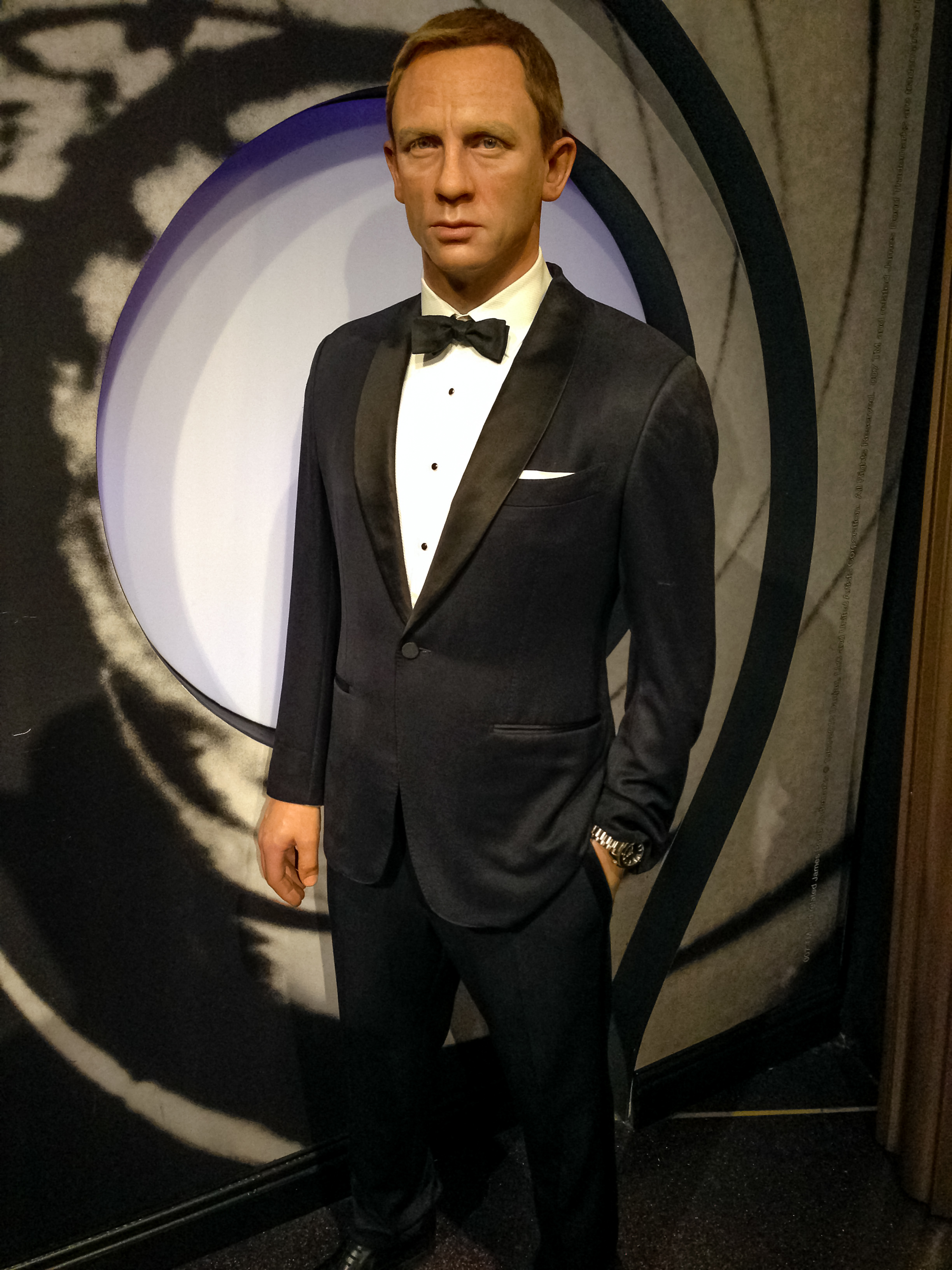
Waxwork of Daniel Craig, the most recent 007, at Madame Tussauds, London

The 25 James Bond films produced by Eon are the longest continually running film series of all time, and including the two non Eon produced films, the 27 Bond films have grossed over $7.04 billion in total, making it the sixth-highest-grossing franchise to date. It is estimated that since Dr. No, a quarter of the world's population have seen at least one Bond film. The UK Film Distributors' Association have stated that the importance of the Bond series of films to the British film industry cannot be overstated, as they "form the backbone of the industry".

Television also saw the effect of Bond films, with the NBC series The Man from U.N.C.L.E., which was described as the "first network television imitation" of Bond, largely because Fleming provided advice and ideas on the development of the series, even giving the main character played by Robert Vaughn the name Napoleon Solo. Other 1960s television series inspired by Bond include I Spy, and Get Smart.

Considered a British cultural icon, James Bond had become such a symbol of the United Kingdom that the character, played by Craig, appeared in the opening ceremony of the 2012 London Olympics as Queen Elizabeth II's escort. From 1968 to 2003, and since 2016, the Cadbury chocolate box Milk Tray has been advertised by the 'Milk Tray Man', a tough James Bond–style figure who undertakes daunting 'raids' to surreptitiously deliver a box of Milk Tray chocolates to a lady. Bond has been commemorated numerous times on a UK postage stamp issued by the Royal Mail, most recently in their March 2020 series to mark the 25th Bond film release.

Throughout the life of the film series, a number of tie-in products have been released. "Bondmania", a term deriving from the adjacent "Beatlemania" and initiated in 1964 following the enormous success of Goldfinger, described the clamour for Bond films and their related products, from soundtrack LPs to children's toys, board games, alarm clocks playing the Bond theme, and 007-branded shirts. In 2018, a James Bond museum opened atop the Austrian Alps. The futuristic museum is constructed on the summit of Gaislachkogl Mountain in Sölden at 10,000 ft (3,048 m) above sea level.

The real MI6 has an ambiguous relationship with Bond. The films may attract job applicants who may be unsuited for espionage, while dissuading more-qualified candidates. While serving as Chief of SIS, Alex Younger said that were Bond to apply for an MI6 job "he would have to change his ways". Younger said, however, that the franchise had "created a powerful brand for MI6 ... Many of our counterparts envy the sheer global recognition of our acronym", and that being depicted to global audiences as a "ubiquitous intelligence presence" was "quite a force multiplier". The Russian Federal Security Service so envied Bond that it created an annual award for fictional depictions of Russian spies.

== Public reception ==
The James Bond franchise enjoys widespread popularity across the world. In 2014, it was estimated that approximately 20% of the world's population has watched at least one Bond film.

In 2012, the polling organisation YouGov conducted a survey of American Bond fans, categorising responses by age, sex and political affiliation. All groups selected Sean Connery as their favourite Bond actor. A 2018 poll found that 47% of American adults had seen at least one Bond film, with 27% having seen every film.

Queen Elizabeth II met the first six actors to play James Bond on the screen. She met Connery at the world premiere of You Only Live Twice in 1967, and, according to the royal biographer Gyles Brandreth: "She really did love all the early James Bond films", preferring the earlier films, "before they got so loud". Several prominent politicians have also been fans of the franchise, including John F. Kennedy, Ronald Reagan and Kim Jong Il.

=== Criticisms ===
The James Bond character and related media have received a number of criticisms and reactions across the political spectrum, and are still highly debated in popular culture studies. Some observers accuse the Bond novels and films of misogyny and sexism. In September 2021, No Time to Die director Cary Fukunaga described Sean Connery's version of Bond as 'basically a rapist'. The franchise has on occasion also been a target of religious criticism. In 1962, Vatican City's official newspaper L'Osservatore Romano condemned the film Dr. No, referring to it as "a dangerous mixture of violence, vulgarity, sadism and sex". However, in 2012, the newspaper went on to give positive reviews to the film Skyfall.

Geographers have considered the role of exotic locations in the movies in the dynamics of the Cold War, with power struggles among blocs playing out in the peripheral areas. Other critics claim that the Bond films reflect imperial nostalgia.

== Censorship and alterations ==
=== Bans and censorship by country ===
Several James Bond novels, films, and video games have been banned, censored, or altered in several countries.

Release year	Title	Country	Notes
Novels
1954	Live and Let Die	Republic of Ireland	Banned in 1954.
1957	Dr. No	Francoist Spain	Under Francoist Spain, the final pages of Dr. No were cut entirely, due to sexual references. The censored editions are still sometimes reproduced in Spain today, often unknowingly.
Various	All titles	Soviet Union	All Bond novels were banned during the existence of the Soviet Union. Russian newspaper the Komsomolskaya Pravda condemned the series, describing it as being set in a "nightmarish world where laws are written at the point of a gun, where coercion and rape is considered valour and murder is a funny trick".
Films
Various	All titles	Soviet Union	All Bond films were banned during the existence of the Soviet Union.
1964	Goldfinger	Israel	In December 1965, shortly after its release in the country, Israel banned the film Goldfinger, after discovering actor Gert Fröbe's past association with the Nazi Party. The ban was lifted two months later, in February 1966, after the Israel Film Censorship Board found evidence that Fröbe had quit the Nazi Party in 1937. Additionally, the film's producers were believed to have made appeals to Israel to lift the ban, and because Israeli public demand to see the popular film was high, the reversal on the ban was made.
2012	Skyfall	People's Republic of China	In 2007, China gave permission for the 2006 film Casino Royale to play uncensored in the nation. It was the first Bond film to gain a release unaltered in the country, followed by Quantum of Solace. However, Skyfall was released in an edited version, after cutting a torture scene, altering subtitles, and removing references to prostitution in the film.
2015	Spectre	India	In 2015, Spectre was released censored in India, after the Central Board of Film Certification ordered kissing scenes in the film be trimmed by 50%.
Video games
1997	GoldenEye 007	Germany	In 1997, Germany banned the video game GoldenEye 007, with the German Federal Review Board placing it on their List of Media Harmful to Minors. The ban was lifted in 2021.

=== 2023 changes ===
In February 2023, Ian Fleming Publications (which administers all Fleming's literary works), edited the Bond series as part of a sensitivity review. The April 2023 re-releases of the series are planned to tie into the 70th anniversary of Casino Royale. The new editions remove a number of references to race, including some slurs, along with some disparagements of women and homosexuality. They include a disclaimer added at the beginning of each book, reading:

This book was written at a time when terms and attitudes which might be considered offensive by modern readers were commonplace. A number of updates have been made in this edition, while keeping as close as possible to the original text and the period in which it is set.

The decision was met with strong criticism by media outlets and public commentators, who condemned the changes as literary censorship. The View host Whoopi Goldberg expressed her opposition, arguing that offensive historical literature should be left unaltered; while National Review contributors Charles C. W. Cooke and Douglas Murray attacked the changes as excessive political correctness. Fleming's biographer Andrew Lycett also opposed the changes, writing that "what an author commits to paper is sacrosanct and shouldn't be altered ...The only changes to the text should come from the author."

== See also ==
- 9007 James Bond, asteroid named after the character
- Spy music

== Bibliography ==
- Bennett, Tony; Woollacott, Janet (2003). "The Moments of Bond". In Lindner, Christoph (ed.). The James Bond Phenomenon: a Critical Reader. Manchester University Press. ISBN 978-0-7190-6541-5.
- Benson, Raymond (1988). The James Bond Bedside Companion. London: Boxtree Ltd. ISBN 978-1-85283-233-9.
- Black, Jeremy (2005). The Politics of James Bond: from Fleming's Novel to the Big Screen. University of Nebraska Press. ISBN 978-0-8032-6240-9.
- Chancellor, Henry (2005). James Bond: The Man and His World. London: John Murray. ISBN 978-0-7195-6815-2.
- Chapman, James (2009). Licence to Thrill: A Cultural History of the James Bond Films. New York: I.B. Tauris. ISBN 978-1-84511-515-9.
- Conroy, Mike (2004). 500 Great Comicbook Action Heroes. London: Chrysalis Books Group. ISBN 978-1-84411-004-9.
- Cork, John; Scivally, Bruce (2002). James Bond: The Legacy. London: Boxtree. ISBN 978-0-7522-6498-1.
- Cork, John; Stutz, Collin (2007). James Bond Encyclopedia. London: Dorling Kindersley. ISBN 978-1-4053-3427-3.
- Feeney Callan, Michael (2002). Sean Connery. London: Virgin Books. ISBN 978-1-85227-992-9.
- Fleming, Ian; Gammidge, Henry; McLusky, John (1988). Octopussy. London: Titan Books. ISBN 1-85286-040-5.
- Griswold, John (2006). Ian Fleming's James Bond: Annotations And Chronologies for Ian Fleming's Bond Stories. AuthorHouse. ISBN 978-1-4259-3100-1. Archived from the original on 23 March 2023.
- Jütting, Kerstin (2007). "Grow Up, 007!" – James Bond Over the Decades: Formula Vs. Innovation. GRIN Verlag. ISBN 978-3-638-85372-9.
- King, Geoff; Krzywinska, Tanya (2002). Screenplay: cinema/videogames/interfaces. Wallflower Press. ISBN 978-1-903364-23-9.
- Lindner, Christoph (2009). The James Bond Phenomenon: a Critical Reader. Manchester University Press. ISBN 978-0-7190-6541-5.
- Lycett, Andrew (1996). Ian Fleming. London: Phoenix. ISBN 978-1-85799-783-5.
- Macintyre, Ben (2008). For Your Eyes Only. London: Bloomsbury Publishing. ISBN 978-0-7475-9527-4.
- Packer, Jeremy (2009). Secret agents: popular icons beyond James Bond. Peter Lang. ISBN 978-0-8204-8669-7.
- Pearson, John (2008). James Bond: The Authorized Biography. Random House. ISBN 978-0-09-950292-0.
- Pfeiffer, Lee; Worrall, Dave (1998). The Essential Bond. London: Boxtree Ltd. ISBN 978-0-7522-2477-0.
- Simpson, Paul (2002). The Rough Guide to James Bond. Rough Guides. ISBN 978-1-84353-142-5.
- Smith, Jim; Lavington, Stephen (2002). Bond Films. London: Virgin Books. ISBN 978-0-7535-0709-4.
- Thompson, Maggie; Frankenhoff, Brent; Bickford, Peter (2010). Comic Book Price Guide 2010. Krause Publications. ISBN 978-1-4402-1399-1. Archived from the original on 24 April 2023.
