= Miss Moneypenny =

Fictional character in James Bond novels and films

- James Bond character
- Lois Maxwell as Moneypenny in You Only Live Twice, in a naval uniform
- First appearance: Casino Royale (1953)
- Created by: Ian Fleming
- Portrayed by: Eon-produced films: Lois Maxwell (1962–1985); Caroline Bliss (1987–1989); Samantha Bond (1995–2002); Naomie Harris (2012–2021); Non Eon-produced films: Barbara Bouchet (1967); Pamela Salem (1983)
- Voiced by: Karly Rothenberg (2005); Kiera Lester (2026)

In-universe information
- Gender: Female
- Occupation: Secretary to M Second Officer WRNS; Former field officer
- Affiliation: MI6
- Nationality: British
- Classification: Ally

Miss Moneypenny, later assigned the first names of Eve or Jane, is a fictional character in the James Bond novels and films. She is secretary to M, who is Bond's superior officer and head of the British Secret Intelligence Service (MI6).

Although she has a small part in most of the films, it is always highlighted by the underscored romantic tension between her and James Bond (something that is virtually non-existent in Ian Fleming's novels, although it is somewhat more apparent in the Bond novels by John Gardner and Raymond Benson).

Although not given a first name by Fleming, the character was given the name Jane in the spin-off book series, The Moneypenny Diaries; in the films, she received the first name of Eve in Skyfall (2012), which is set in the new continuity opened by 2006's Casino Royale, where the character spent time as a field officer before becoming secretary to M (Ralph Fiennes). According to the film You Only Live Twice (1967), Moneypenny (Lois Maxwell) holds the rank of second officer in the Women's Royal Naval Service.

== Background ==
In Ian Fleming's first draft of Casino Royale (1953), Moneypenny's name was originally "Miss 'Petty' Pettaval", which was taken from Kathleen Pettigrew, the personal assistant to MI6 director Stewart Menzies. Fleming changed it to be less obvious. Other candidates for Moneypenny's inspiration include Vera Atkins of Special Operations Executive; Paddy Ridsdale, a Naval Intelligence secretary; Joan Bright Astley, whom Fleming dated during World War II, and who was noted for giving a warm and friendly reception to senior officers who visited her office to view confidential papers; and Joan Howe, Fleming's red-haired secretary at The Times who had typed the manuscript of Casino Royale. The BBC has referred to Jean Frampton—who typed Ian Fleming's later manuscripts and suggested plot ideas—as "Fleming's Miss Moneypenny", despite the fact that they never met.

== Summary ==
Miss Moneypenny is the private secretary of M, the head of MI6. She holds the rank of Second Officer in the Women's Royal Naval Service, which is a prerequisite rank for this position. She is cleared for Top Secret, Eyes Only, and Cabinet-level intelligence reports, the last of which she is often required to prepare, and in some cases present.

Moneypenny was never given any backstory until the film Skyfall (2012), when she was re-introduced to the series following the 2006 reboot of the series' continuity Casino Royale. Moneypenny, now played by Naomie Harris and given the first name Eve, is originally a field officer assigned to work with Bond (Daniel Craig) on an operation in Istanbul. It ends in disaster when she is ordered to shoot through Bond while he is fighting hand-to-hand combat with Patrice (Ola Rapace), the mercenary they are chasing. She hits Bond, who falls off a bridge and is assumed dead. She is temporarily suspended for this and reassigned to desk duty, assisting Gareth Mallory (Ralph Fiennes), the Chairman of the Intelligence and Security Committee, who has been assigned to watch over MI6. When Bond resurfaces and returns to duty, she meets with him in Macau and aids in locating Sévérine (Bérénice Marlohe), an agent of main villain Raoul Silva's (Javier Bardem) before returning to London. Later in the film, she is a participant in another shootout with Silva, when he ambushes a public inquiry into MI6. By the end of the film, she decides to retire from fieldwork and becomes Mallory's secretary once he takes over the role of M.

== Role ==
"Of course she's in love with Bond, but she's too much a lady to go chasing after him. So she smiles and bides her time. In a way, you can't blame her. Every woman would like to live dangerously with James Bond, if only for 20 minutes, or half a night..."

— Lois Maxwell

In both the Bond novels and films based upon them, Moneypenny is smitten with Bond. For example, in the novel Thunderball (1961), Fleming wrote that she "often dreamed hopelessly about Bond". However, she never explicitly voices these feelings.

Miss Moneypenny's role in Fleming's novels is even smaller than her role in the films. In the novels, Bond also has his own secretary, Loelia Ponsonby and later Mary Goodnight, both of whose lines and relationships were often transferred to Miss Moneypenny for the films. As a rule, Moneypenny generally never directly participates in Bond's missions. However, in Skyfall, Moneypenny is an MI6 officer who directly assists Bond in the field before becoming the new M's secretary. In the film Octopussy, Moneypenny (Lois Maxwell) has an assistant named Penelope Smallbone (Michaela Clavell), who appears to be equally smitten with Bond (Roger Moore), despite a "thorough briefing" on the subject by Moneypenny. Intended as either a foil or a replacement for Moneypenny, Smallbone appeared only that once.

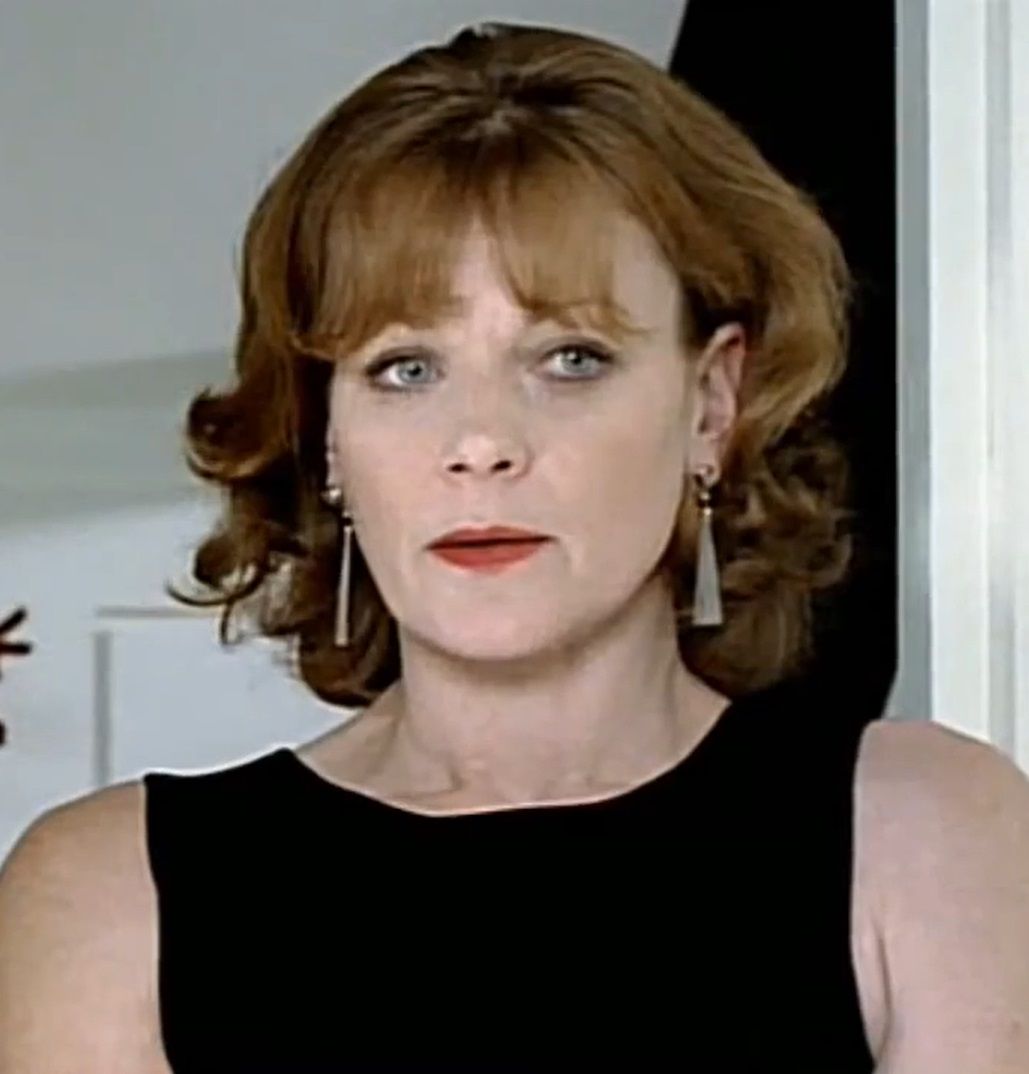
Samantha Bond in The Murder Room (2004)

In most of the Bond films, there is a scene, usually Bond's arrival at M's office, in which Bond and Moneypenny exchange witty, flirtatious conversation. ("Flattery will get you nowhere, but don't stop trying.") In the earlier films, these exchanges are more sexually charged, with Bond (Sean Connery) often kissing or caressing Moneypenny sensually. In Die Another Day (2002), Moneypenny (Samantha Bond) puts on Q's (John Cleese) virtual reality glasses and runs a simulation in which she and Bond (Pierce Brosnan) finally consummate their relationship. Q interrupts her, and she pretends she was using it as a combat simulation.

In the original film version of Casino Royale, actress Barbara Bouchet plays M's current secretary and explains to Sir James Bond (played by David Niven) upon their first meeting that she is the original Miss Moneypenny's daughter. She is referred to thereafter, and in the closing credits, as Moneypenny.

Since the character's first appearance in Casino Royale, neither Fleming nor any succeeding Bond novelist gave Moneypenny a first name. In a number of books and at least one film, Bond refers to her by the nickname "Penny" (a shortened version of her last name). However, The Moneypenny Diaries gives her first name as Jane, while in Skyfall, the character is named Eve.

After Lois Maxwell's death, Roger Moore recalled that she would have liked to have become the new M after Moore's retirement. She had suggested herself for the role of M but had been turned down. "I think it was a great disappointment to her that she had not been promoted to play M. She would have been a wonderful M."

== The Moneypenny Diaries ==
On 10 October 2005, John Murray published The Moneypenny Diaries: Guardian Angel (2005), the first of three Ian Fleming Publications' sanctioned novels written by Samantha Weinberg under the pseudonym Kate Westbrook, from the point of view of Miss Moneypenny. The rest of The Moneypenny Diaries trilogy was released over the next three years, consisting of Secret Servant: The Moneypenny Diaries (2006) and The Moneypenny Diaries: Final Fling (2008).

== Films ==
Moneypenny has been played by six actresses in the Bond films: four in the Eon film series, plus two in the non-Eon films. The last three actresses to play Moneypenny (Caroline Bliss, Samantha Bond and Naomie Harris) are all alumni of Bristol Old Vic Theatre School.

=== Eon Productions series ===
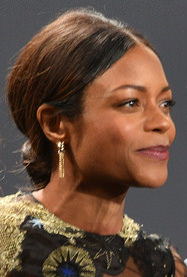
Naomie Harris, the incumbent actress of the role.

Lois Maxwell

1. Dr. No (1962)
2. From Russia with Love (1963)
3. Goldfinger (1964)
4. Thunderball (1965)
5. You Only Live Twice (1967)
6. On Her Majesty's Secret Service (1969)
7. Diamonds Are Forever (1971)
8. Live and Let Die (1973)
9. The Man with the Golden Gun (1974)
10. The Spy Who Loved Me (1977)
11. Moonraker (1979)
12. For Your Eyes Only (1981)
13. Octopussy (1983)
14. A View to a Kill (1985)

Caroline Bliss

1. The Living Daylights (1987)
2. Licence to Kill (1989)

Samantha Bond

1. GoldenEye (1995)
2. Tomorrow Never Dies (1997)
3. The World Is Not Enough (1999)
4. Die Another Day (2002)

Naomie Harris (as "Eve Moneypenny")

1. Skyfall (2012)
2. Spectre (2015)
3. No Time to Die (2021)

=== Non-Eon films ===
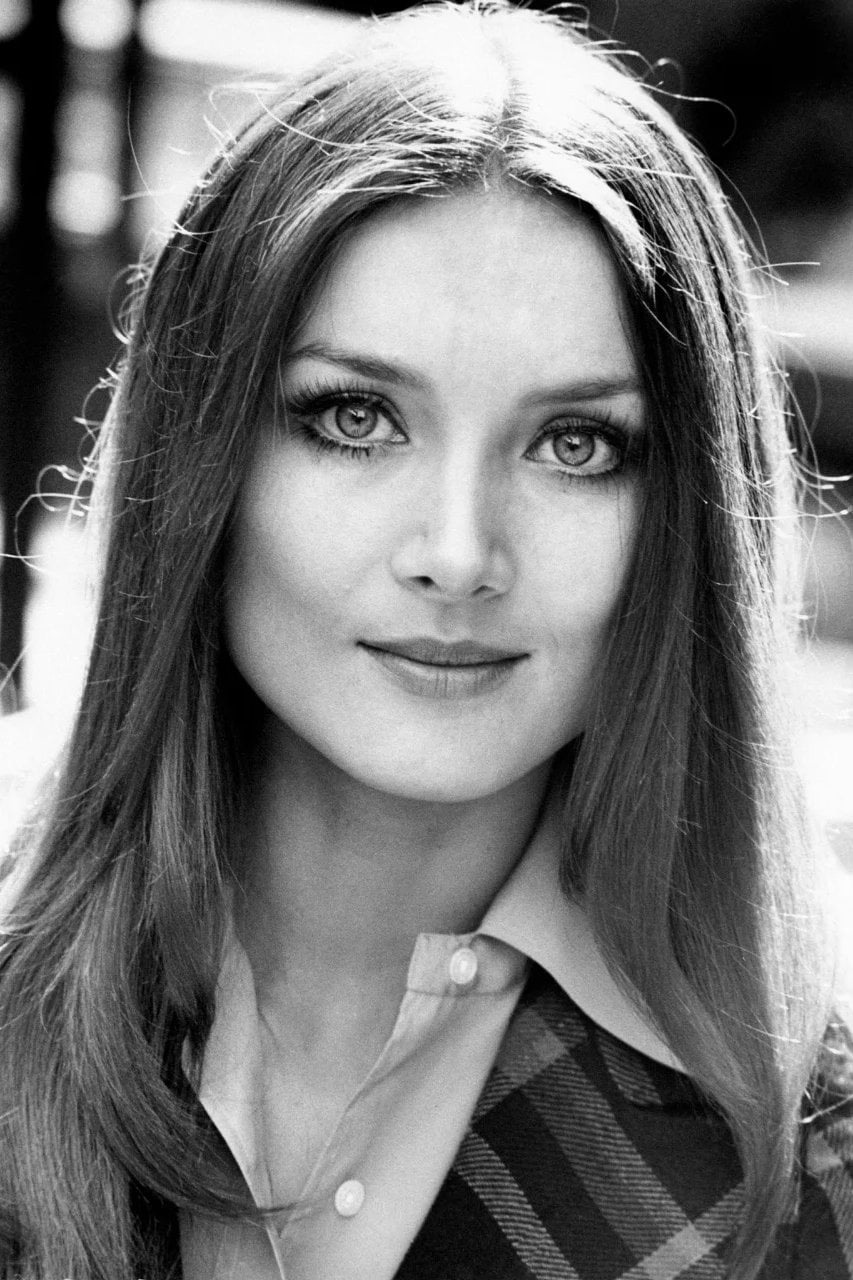
Barbara Bouchet appeared in only the 1967 parody film Casino Royale

Barbara Bouchet

1. Casino Royale (1967) (Bouchet actually plays Moneypenny's daughter)

Pamela Salem

1. Never Say Never Again (1983)

=== Other appearances ===
- Lois Maxwell portrays Moneypenny in the television special Welcome to Japan, Mr. Bond (1967), which was produced by United Artists Television.
- Lois Maxwell played herself in the Italian film OK Connery (1967) and played Miss Moneypenny in the 1975 French film Bons baisers de Hong Kong.
- Samantha Bond took up the role again in an advertisement for London's (ultimately successful) London 2012 Olympic bid. She appeared alongside Roger Moore, who played 007 between 1973 and 1985.
- In the video game From Russia with Love (2005), Moneypenny appears with Lois Maxwell's likeness in the same film. She is voiced by Karly Rothenberg (who also voices Rosa Klebb in the game).
- Moneypenny appears in Dynamite Entertainment's 2015 James Bond comic book series. Though the series is heavily inspired by the original Ian Fleming stories, this version of Moneypenny is black, much like Naomie Harris' portrayal in the movies. This rendition of the character is both M's secretary and personal security agent, who tends to defend her superior from physical threats by all means at all cost. A spin-off one-shot Moneypenny, created by Jody Houser and Jacob Edgar, starring this rendition of the character was published in August 2017.
- Miss Moneypenny is a non-player-character to interact with in the 1983 role-playing game James Bond 007. She is described as a crack shot, having shot a would-be assassin trying to kill M; she placed six shots in the assassin that could be covered by a tea saucer. It is even a mild rebuke for an agent with poor marksmanship if M ever says, "My assistant can shoot better than you."
- IO Interactive's 2026 007 First Light features a new iteration of Moneypenny, played by Kiera Lester. To introduce old characters to new audiences, IO Interactive adapted Moneypenny's character to reflect how she and other characters shaped Bond's early career. Additionally, instead of being M's secretary, she is a cybersecurity and counter-terrorism expert.

== In other media ==
In The Last Resort: A Memoir of Zimbabwe (2009), Douglas Rogers dedicated chapter 11 (titled "Miss Moneypenny") to his father Ian's black market currency dealer in Mutare.

In the 2011 British TV drama series The Hour, set in the mid-1950s when Fleming's James Bond books first became popular, the characters Freddie Lyon (Ben Whishaw) and Bel Rowley (Romola Garai) address each other as "Moneypenny" and "James".

In the 1990s and early-to-mid-2000s the famous Birmingham nightclub Moneypennys was based on her character fitting the theme of glam-house music. The insinuation of the brand instigating "Bond Girls Only" complete with its venues booked in high class outlets, manor parks and designer apparel wearing attendees clearly visible in the queues all fitting to the James Bond glamour theme. In addition, the club featured high end sports cars, supercars and luxury vehicles in the car park. DJs from the world over were flown in including Roger Sanchez, Eric Morillo and Little Louie Vega.

== See also ==
- List of James Bond allies

== Notes ==
Preceded by Camille Montes	Bond girl (main sidekick); 2012	Succeeded by Dr. Madeleine Swann
