= Samantha Weinberg =

British writer (born 1966)

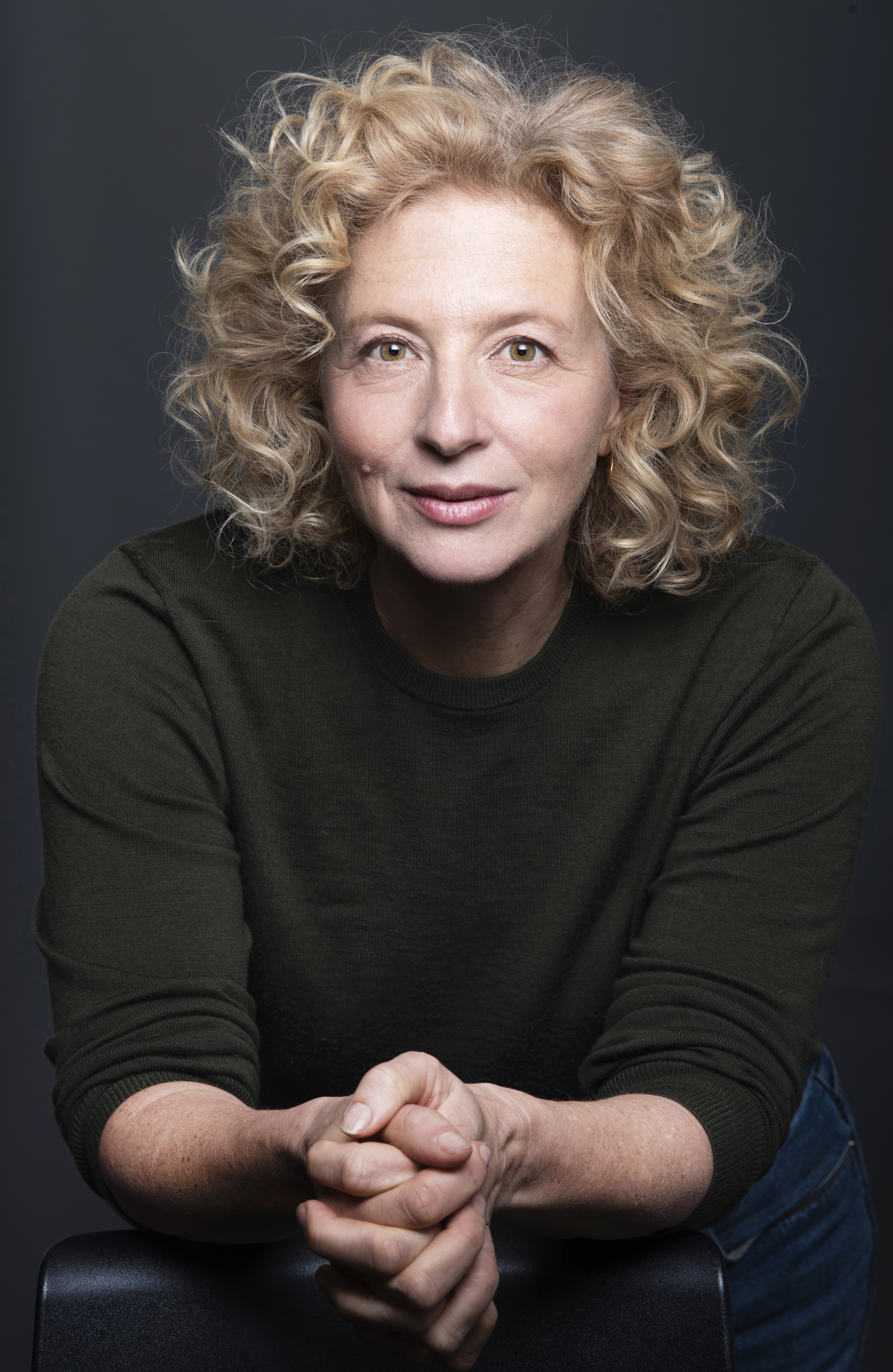
Samantha Weinberg 2023

Samantha Weinberg is a British novelist, journalist and podcaster. Educated at St Paul's Girls' School and Trinity College, Cambridge, she is the author of books such as A Fish Caught in Time: The Search for the Coelacanth and the James Bond-inspired trilogy The Moneypenny Diaries under the alias Kate Westbrook. Since 2019, she has been a contributor to Tortoise Media. In 2023, she wrote and narrated Trace of Doubt, an eight-part true crime podcast series for Audible.

== Writing ==
In 1994, Weinberg wrote Last of the Pirates: in search of Bob Denard (ISBN 0224033077) about French mercenary Bob Denard. In 1995, she spent three months travelling in the United States with Daisy Waugh.

Weinberg's 2000 book A Fish Caught in Time chronicled the 1938 rediscovery of the coelacanth, a fish long thought extinct. Canadian author Louise Penny has named it as one of her favorite books.

In 2003, Weinberg won the CWA Gold Dagger for Non-Fiction for her book Pointing from the Grave: a True Story of Murder and DNA (ISBN 0241141362), about the murder of biotechnologist Helena Greenwood in California in 1985 and the pioneering use of DNA profiling in tracing her killer 15 years later.

== The Moneypenny Diaries ==
When Weinberg's agent, Gillon Aitken, was appointed the literary adviser to Ian Fleming Publications, she and Aitken pitched their idea for a series of James Bond novels centred on the character of Miss Moneypenny, M's personal secretary. The series, referred to as The Moneypenny Diaries, is a trilogy with three books and two short stories currently published under the alias of Moneypenny's editor, Kate Westbrook:

- The Moneypenny Diaries: Guardian Angel (2005)
- "For Your Eyes Only, James" (2006 short story)
- Secret Servant: The Moneypenny Diaries (2006)
- "Moneypenny's First Date With Bond" (2006 short story)
- The Moneypenny Diaries: Final Fling (2008)

Weinberg is the first woman to write an official Bond novel.

== Politics ==
In 2010, Weinberg became the Green Party candidate for the new seat of Chippenham in Wiltshire, standing under her married name.

== Personal life ==
Weinberg is married to filmmaker Mark Fletcher. She currently resides in Wiltshire, England, and has two children.
