= Secret Servant: The Moneypenny Diaries =

2006 novel by Samantha Weinberg

The Moneypenny Diaries: Secret Servant
- First edition UK hardback
- Author: Samantha Weinberg as "Kate Westbrook"
- Language: English
- Series: James Bond
- Genre: Spy novel
- Publisher: John Murray
- Publication date: 2 November 2006
- Publication place: United Kingdom
- Media type: Print (Hardcover and Paperback)
- Pages: 320 pp (first edition, hardback)
- ISBN: 0-7195-6767-X (first edition, hardback)
- OCLC: 69484530
- Preceded by: The Moneypenny Diaries: Guardian Angel
- Followed by: The Moneypenny Diaries: Final Fling

Secret Servant: The Moneypenny Diaries is the second in a trilogy of novels chronicling the life of Miss Moneypenny, M's personal secretary in Ian Fleming's James Bond series. The diaries are penned by Samantha Weinberg under the pseudonym Kate Westbrook, who is depicted as the book's "editor." Published by John Murray publishers, Secret Servant was released on November 2, 2006, in the UK following the first instalment, subtitled Guardian Angel that was released in 2005. No North American release has been announced as of October 2008.

== Plot introduction ==
From saving spies to private passions, this book covers the secret adventures of James Bond's right-hand woman. Jane Moneypenny may project a cool, calm and collected image but her secret diaries reveal a rather different story. In the grip of an uncertain love affair and haunted by a dark family secret, the last thing she needs is a crisis at work. But the Secret Intelligence Service is in chaos. One senior officer is on trial for treason, another has defected to Moscow and her beloved James Bond has been brainwashed by the KGB. Only a woman's touch can save them. Moneypenny soon finds herself embroiled in a highly charged adventure infused with the glamour of the Cold War espionage game. Alone on a dangerous Russian mission she turns, with breathless intimacy, to writing a truly explosive private diary.

== Production ==
- In order to write the book, Weinberg met up with former Secret Service agents and even travelled to Moscow to meet Kim Philby's widow.

== See also ==
- Outline of James Bond
