= The Moneypenny Diaries: Final Fling =

2008 book by Samantha Weinberg

- First edition
- Author: Samantha Weinberg as "Kate Westbrook"
- Illustrator: Unknown
- Cover artist: Stina Perrson
- Language: English
- Series: James Bond
- Genre: Spy novel
- Publisher: John Murray
- Publication date: 1 May 2008
- Publication place: United Kingdom
- Media type: Unknown
- Pages: Unknown
- ISBN: 978-0-7195-6780-3
- OCLC: 191243512
- Preceded by: Secret Servant: The Moneypenny Diaries

The Moneypenny Diaries: Final Fling is the third in a trilogy of novels chronicling the life of Miss Moneypenny, M's personal secretary in Ian Fleming's James Bond series. The diaries are penned by Samantha Weinberg under the pseudonym Kate Westbrook, who is depicted as the book's "editor". The novel was published by John Murray publishers on May 1, 2008 in the UK in hardcover followed by the paperback on October 30, 2008. As with the second volume, no North American release has been announced as of May 2009.

== Plot introduction ==
From saving spies to private passions, this book covers the secret adventures of James Bond's right-hand woman. Jane Moneypenny may project a cool, calm and collected image but her secret diaries reveal a rather different story. Kate Westbrook is trying to publish Miss Moneypenny's diaries, but everyone she speaks to about them is trying to stop her. Whilst in consultation with Tanner it is hinted to Westbrook that her aunt was murdered because she was searching too hard for the MI6 mole.

Locations for this final adventure include Jamaica, the Outer Hebrides, Cambridge, and London. The storyline is almost evenly divided between the adventures of Miss Moneypenny and the modern adventures of author "Kate Westbrook."

== See also ==
- Outline of James Bond
