= The Moneypenny Diaries: Guardian Angel =

2005 novel by Samantha Weinberg

- First edition UK hardback
- Author: Samantha Weinberg as "Kate Westbrook"
- Language: English
- Series: James Bond
- Genre: Spy novel
- Publisher: John Murray
- Publication date: 2005 (UK); 2008 (US)
- Publication place: United Kingdom
- Media type: Print (Hardback & Paperback)
- ISBN: 0-7195-6868-4
- Followed by: Secret Servant: The Moneypenny Diaries

The Moneypenny Diaries: Guardian Angel is the first in a trilogy of novels chronicling the life of Miss Moneypenny, M's personal secretary in Ian Fleming's James Bond series. The diaries were authored by Samantha Weinberg under the pseudonym Kate Westbrook, who is depicted as the book's editor. The first instalment, subtitled Guardian Angel, was released in the United Kingdom on October 10, 2005, by John Murray publishers. A United States edition was published by Thomas Dunne Books on May 13, 2008, although this edition has no subtitle.

The second volume of the series, Secret Servant: The Moneypenny Diaries, was published on November 2, 2006, in the UK.

Weinberg is the first woman to write an officially licensed James Bond–related novel.

== Plot introduction ==
The first diary fills in the gaps between a number of agent 007's missions including the period between On Her Majesty's Secret Service and You Only Live Twice, but also includes an entire backstory for Moneypenny. For the first time since Fleming introduced the character alongside Bond in Casino Royale, Moneypenny is given a first name: Jane.

== An authorised book? ==
Although it has since been announced as an official book from Ian Fleming Publications, the holder of the literary rights to James Bond, there was some confusion and even deception prior to release as to whether the book was actually authorised by them.

The trilogy had originally been touted as the secret journal of a "real" Miss Moneypenny and that James Bond was a possible pseudonym for a genuine intelligence officer, the idea of which was perhaps influenced similarly to John Pearson's 1973 authorised biography of James Bond. James Bond: The Authorised Biography of 007 was based on the obituary in Ian Fleming's You Only Live Twice, in which Fleming hints that Bond is perhaps a real man.

An investigation by The Sunday Times into whether or not The Moneypenny Diaries were in some way real forced John Murray publishers to admit that the novel was in fact a "spoof". Prior to the admission, Kate Westbrook was said to be niece of the "real" Jane Moneypenny and that the diaries were discovered after her death in 1990. It was also claimed that Westbrook was a fellow of Trinity College, Cambridge; however, the college replied stating no such person was in employment there. In an interview, Weinberg revealed that the 'Kate Westbrook' subterfuge stretched as far as her wearing a wig and coloured contact lenses for media interviews and at the launch party.

The novel was officially recognized as an authorised book from Ian Fleming Publications on the day of the book's publication in the UK, October 10, 2005. A side effect of the deception was a delay in this book finding an American publisher.

== Publication history ==
- UK first hardback edition: October 10, 2005 John Murray
- UK first paperback edition: May 8, 2006 John Murray
- US first hardback edition: May 13, 2008 Thomas Dunne Books

== See also ==
- Outline of James Bond
