= Berns-Martin =

Berns-Martin is the name given to a brand of split-front holster made only for a revolver. This type of holster was later referred to as a "Break Front" during the 1970s with the introduction of such a model by the Bianchi Holster Co.

== Development and functionality ==
The Berns-Martin holster was first developed in the 1930s by J.E. Berns of the Navy Rifle Team, who, assigned to shore duty in Alaska, decided he wanted to carry a long-barrelled gun for hunting and invented a holster that allowed him to carry such a revolver high on his hip and out of the Alaskan snow. The leather work was left to Berns' Navy teammate Jack Martin, who had previously designed the sheath for the Fairbairn–Sykes fighting knife, hence the name "Berns-Martin" for the company. The holster was patented by John Emmett Berns in 1935 as 2,001,321 for a Revolver Holster. When used in a hip holster, the revolver is drawn by pushing down (slightly) on the revolver grip while rocking the top of the revolver forward through the open front of the holster. While in the holster, a leather covered steel spring holds the revolver cylinder (and the rest of the revolver) securely in the holster, regardless of what physical gyrations the wearer might go through. No less an authority than Jeff Cooper stated that the Berns-Martin holster "keeps the pistol secure enough for anything up to parachute jumping, and yet permit drawing without releasing any latch or strap beforehand."

== The 1950s to 1970s ==
From the 1950s through the 1970s the holster type was popular with American law enforcement due to the high level of security provided to the revolver used ubiquitously during the period. Because the Berns-Martin split-front holsters can only be used with revolvers (the rear loop of the trigger guard being engaged to grasp the revolver), and the near universal adoption of semi-automatic pistols by American law enforcement in the 1980s, the split-front revolver holster has fallen out of favor with American police forces since the 1980s. A second, and equally well-known version, of the Berns-Martin holster was the company's Lightnin' holster, a shoulder holster also for revolvers that carried them with the muzzles pointed upwards; that is, "upside down". It was this holster that was made famous by its inclusion in Ian Fleming's later Bond books, although it was not suited to Bond's Walther semi-auto pistol, causing the company to mark its brochures of the period, "no shoulder holster made for automatics". Various adaptations of the Berns-Martin upside-down holster continue to this day, beginning with those various models made by the Bianchi Holster and Safariland companies of the 1960s/70s/80s/90s and into today.

As of 2012, C. Rusty Sherrick was producing a Berns-Martin type holster in a belted version called the Gumshoe Special.

As of 2018, A.E. Nelson of Scio, Oregon, makes traditional break front hosters in a variety of duty configurations for medium and large frame revolvers.
