= Simon Winder =

British writer

Simon Winder is a British writer. He is the author of several books, including a trilogy of books on the history of Central Europe: Germania, Danubia and Lotharingia. The second book in the trilogy, Danubia, which deals with the Habsburg monarchy, was longlisted for the Samuel Johnson Prize. His books about Central Europe mix historical writing with autobiographical reflections on his travels in various countries in the region. The title of his book Germania evokes both the Roman term for the area inhabited by the Germanic peoples, and the personification of the German nation, also known as Germania. His book Lotharingia explores the culture and legacy of the historical kingdom of Lotharingia, which encompassed the present-day territory of various European countries, including France, Netherlands and Germany. His books have been praised for their humour and learning.

Winder is a publishing director at Penguin Books. He has written for The Guardian. He lives in Wandsworth Town in London.

In December 2025 Winder revealed that he had received a diagnosis of Alzheimer's.

== Bibliography ==
- The Man Who Saved Britain: A Personal Journey into the Disturbing World of James Bond (2006)
- Germania: In Wayward Pursuit of the Germans and Their History (2010)
- Danubia: A Personal History of Habsburg Europe (2013)
- Lotharingia: A Personal History of Europe's Lost Country (2019)

== See also ==
- Claudio Magris
