= List of James Bond novels and short stories =

James Bond novels and short stories
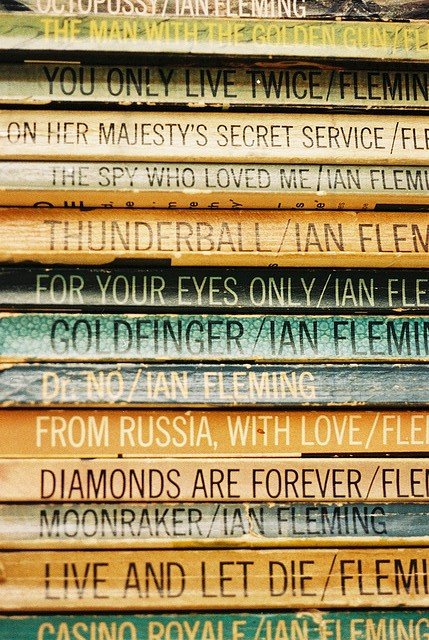
- Ian Fleming's James Bond novels
- Author: Ian Fleming
- Country: United Kingdom
- Language: English
- Genre: Spy fiction
- Publisher: Jonathan Cape
- Published: 1953–1966
- Media type: Print (hardback and paperback)
- No. of books: 14

James Bond is a literary series of novels and short stories, first published in 1953 by the British author Ian Fleming. The protagonist of the series, James Bond, is a British Secret Service agent, often referred to by his code name 007. The character first appeared in the 1953 novel Casino Royale; the books are set in a contemporary period during Fleming's lifetime from 1951 to 1964. Fleming wrote twelve novels and two collections of short stories in the series, all at his Jamaican home Goldeneye and published annually. Two of the books were published after Fleming's death in 1964.

Since Fleming's death, other authors have written continuation works. Some of these have been novelisations of episodes in the series of James Bond films, produced by Eon Productions, while others were either continuation novels or short stories. The first author was Kingsley Amis, writing under the pseudonym of Robert Markham, who produced one novel. He was followed by novelist and biographer John Pearson, who wrote a fictional biography of Bond. The novelist and screenwriter Christopher Wood wrote two novelisations in the late 1970s. John Gardner was asked to continue the series by Ian Fleming Publications, the copyright holders to the franchise; he wrote fourteen novels and two novelisations between 1981 and 1996. After Gardner retired due to ill health, the author Raymond Benson continued the stories and wrote six Bond novels, three novelisations and three short stories between 1996 and 2002. In 2025, Benson returned to write The Hook and the Eye, which is focused around the Bond character Felix Leiter.

There was a hiatus of six years before Sebastian Faulks was commissioned to write a further Bond novel, which was released on 28 May 2008, the 100th anniversary of Ian Fleming's birth. This was followed in 2011 by a novel by the author Jeffery Deaver and a 2013 book by William Boyd. A further trilogy was written by Anthony Horowitz, with books published in 2015, 2018 and 2022. Charlie Higson has written two adult Bond novels: On His Majesty's Secret Service in 2023, and King Zero in 2026. There have also been four spin-off book series, sanctioned by Fleming's estate. Young Bond, based around Bond's adventures while a schoolboy at Eton College. The Moneypenny Diaries, a series of books and short stories focusing on the supporting character Miss Moneypenny. The Double-0 Trilogy focusing on The Double-O section and their various agents and their missions. The Q Mysteries, focusing on Q aka Major Boothroyd, solving mysteries in his hometown. James Bond and the Secret Academy is a children's book series that is scheduled to be released in 2027.

== Ian Fleming James Bond novels ==
During the Second World War, Ian Fleming had mentioned to friends that he wanted to write a spy novel, but it was not until 17 February 1952 that he began to write his first novel, Casino Royale. He started writing his book at his Jamaican home Goldeneye, typing out 2,000 words in the morning, directly from his own experiences and imagination; he finished work on the manuscript in just over two months, completing it on 18 March 1952. Publishers Jonathan Cape were initially reluctant to publish the book, but were persuaded by Fleming's brother Peter (1907–1971), who had previously published material through them. On 13 April 1953 Casino Royale was released in the UK in hardcover, priced at 10s, 6d, with a cover that had been devised by Fleming himself. The first edition of 4,728 copies of Casino Royale sold out in less than a month; a second print run the same month also sold out, as did a third run of more than 8,000 books published in May 1954. At the time, Fleming was the Foreign Manager for Kemsley Newspapers, an organisation which owned The Sunday Times. Upon accepting the job, Fleming requested that he be allowed three months' holiday per year, which allowed him the freedom to write.

The novel centred on the exploits of James Bond, an intelligence officer in the 00 section of the Secret Intelligence Service, commonly known as MI6. Bond was also known by his code number, 007, and was a Royal Naval Reserve Commander. Fleming took the name for his character from that of the eponymous American ornithologist, a Caribbean bird expert and author of the definitive field guide Birds of the West Indies. Fleming based his creation on a number of individuals he came across during his time in the Naval Intelligence Division during World War II, admitting that Bond "was a compound of all the secret agents and commando types I met during the war". After the publication of Casino Royale, Fleming used his annual holiday at his house in Oracabessa, Jamaica to write another Bond story; in total, between 1953 and 1966, two years after his death, twelve Bond novels and two short-story collections were published, with the last two books—The Man with the Golden Gun and Octopussy and The Living Daylights—published posthumously.

=== Books, by publication sequence ===
Title	Author	Publisher	Date	Length (first edition)	Plot	Ref.
Casino Royale	Ian Fleming	Jonathan Cape	13 April 1953	213 pp	James Bond is sent to play against and bankrupt Le Chiffre, the paymaster for a SMERSH-controlled trade union, in a high-stakes baccarat game in France. With help from CIA agent Felix Leiter, Bond wins the game, but is betrayed by Vesper Lynd, a double agent. Lynd falls in love with Bond and, instead of betraying him, commits suicide.	
Live and Let Die	Ian Fleming	Jonathan Cape	5 April 1954	234 pp	Bond is sent to the United States to investigate "Mr. Big", an agent of SMERSH and an underworld voodoo leader who is suspected of selling 17th-century gold coins to finance Soviet spy operations in America. Bond's friend and CIA ally, Felix Leiter, is captured and fed to a shark while Mr. Big's fortune-telling girlfriend, Solitaire, runs off with Bond. Solitaire is captured by Mr. Big, but Bond saves her and blows up Mr. Big's yacht with a limpet mine.	
Moonraker	Ian Fleming	Jonathan Cape	5 April 1955	256 pp	Bond joins M at Blades to stop a member, Sir Hugo Drax, cheating at bridge. Bond is subsequently seconded onto Drax's staff on the "Moonraker", Britain's first nuclear missile project. Bond discovers that Drax is an ex-Nazi, working for the Soviets; he also establishes that the rocket is not a defence, but is to be used by Drax to destroy London. Bond re-targets the rocket, sending it into the North Sea, where it kills Drax.	
Diamonds Are Forever	Ian Fleming	Jonathan Cape	26 March 1956	257 pp	Bond follows a diamond smuggling ring to America and establishes that it is run by an American gang, "The Spangled Mob". He closes down the pipeline by killing one of the heads of the gang, Seraffimo Spang, in a train crash; he then travels to Sierra Leone to kill the other head of the gang, Jack Spang.	
From Russia, with Love	Ian Fleming	Jonathan Cape	8 April 1957	253 pp	Bond is targeted by SMERSH to be killed in a compromising situation on the Orient Express. He is lured to Istanbul by an attractive young cipher clerk, Corporal Tatiana Romanova, who claims to be defecting and bringing a Spektor, a Russian decoding device much coveted by MI6. Returning to London by train Bond meets SMERSH assassin, Red Grant, pretending to be a fellow British agent. Grant drugs Romanova and attempts to kill Bond, but fails: instead Bond kills Grant. Bond is then nearly killed by Colonel Rosa Klebb, one of the SMERSH planners, before he manages to capture her.	
Dr. No	Ian Fleming	Jonathan Cape	31 March 1958	256 pp	Commander John Strangways, the head of MI6 Station J in Kingston, Jamaica, and his secretary Mary Trueblood both disappear and Bond is sent to investigate the matter. Bond finds they had been investigating the activities of Dr. Julius No, a reclusive Chinese-German who lives on Crab Key and runs a guano mine. Bond suspects a connection to the disappearances and, with the assistance of his old friend Quarrel, Bond visits Crab Key. He is captured by Dr. No and establishes that No has been sabotaging American missile tests at nearby Cape Canaveral. Bond escapes and kills No.	
Goldfinger	Ian Fleming	Jonathan Cape	23 March 1959	318 pp	Bond investigates the activities of Auric Goldfinger, a gold smuggler whom M suspects of being connected to SMERSH and financing their western networks with his gold. Bond is captured by Goldfinger and forced to work as a secretary to oversee "Operation Grand Slam", the stealing of the United States gold reserves from Fort Knox. Bond manages to alert the US authorities through his friend, Felix Leiter, and the plot is foiled.	
For Your Eyes Only	Ian Fleming	Jonathan Cape	11 April 1960	252 pp	Collection of five short stories largely adapted from plots developed for a prospective TV series:	
For Your Eyes Only	Ian Fleming	Jonathan Cape	11 April 1960	252 pp	"From a View to a Kill": Bond investigates the murder of a motorcycle dispatch-rider and the theft of his top-secret documents by a motorcycle-riding assassin.	
For Your Eyes Only	Ian Fleming	Jonathan Cape	11 April 1960	252 pp	"For Your Eyes Only": Bond avenges the murder of M's closest friends.	
For Your Eyes Only	Ian Fleming	Jonathan Cape	11 April 1960	252 pp	"Quantum of Solace": Bond is told a story of a failed marriage with an emotive twist.	
For Your Eyes Only	Ian Fleming	Jonathan Cape	11 April 1960	252 pp	"Risico": Bond investigates a drug-smuggling operation run by the Russians.	
For Your Eyes Only	Ian Fleming	Jonathan Cape	11 April 1960	252 pp	"The Hildebrand Rarity": Bond helps find a rare fish for an obnoxious millionaire who is subsequently murdered.	
Thunderball	Ian Fleming (Note: Based on a screen treatment by Kevin McClory, Jack Whittingham and Fleming)	Jonathan Cape	27 March 1961	253 pp	An international, non-aligned terrorist organisation, SPECTRE, has hijacked a NATO plane and seized its two nuclear bombs, which it uses to blackmail the western world. Bond is sent to the Bahamas, where he joins forces with Felix Leiter. Bond meets "Domino" Vitali, the sister of the pilot who stole the plane with the bombs on board, who is also the mistress of a wealthy treasure hunter, Emilio Largo. Bond and Leiter suspect Largo and, using a nuclear submarine, track him to the bombs: while the submarine's crew fight Largo's crew, Bond battles with Largo and is overpowered, but before Largo can finish Bond off, Domino shoots him with a spear gun.	
The Spy Who Loved Me	Ian Fleming	Jonathan Cape	16 April 1962	221 pp	A young woman is alone, working at a motel when two thugs, hired by the owner, turn up to burn it down for the insurance. They are about to rape the woman when Bond turns up and stops them. Later that night, Bond is attacked, but kills both the thugs.	
On Her Majesty's Secret Service	Ian Fleming	Jonathan Cape	1 April 1963	288 pp	Bond continues to search for Ernst Stavro Blofeld after the Thunderball incident. Through contact with the College of Arms in London Bond finds Blofeld based in Switzerland with a co-conspirator, Irma Bunt. After meeting him and discovering his latest plans, Bond attacks the centre where he is based, although Blofeld escapes in the confusion. Bond meets and falls in love with Contessa Teresa "Tracy" di Vicenzo during the story and the pair marry, but Blofeld kills Bond's new wife hours after the ceremony.	
You Only Live Twice	Ian Fleming	Jonathan Cape	16 March 1964	255 pp	After the murder of his wife, Bond begins to let his life slide. M gives him a last chance of redemption, to persuade the Japanese to share radio transmissions captured from the Soviet Union. The Japanese agree, but only if Bond kills Dr. Guntram Shatterhand, who operates a politically embarrassing "Garden of Death" in an ancient castle. Bond recognises Shatterhand and his wife as Blofeld and Bunt and he infiltrates their castle. He kills Blofeld and escapes, although he is injured as the castle explodes; his injury leaves him with amnesia and he lives as a Japanese fisherman until he travels to Russia to find out about his past.	
The Man with the Golden Gun	Ian Fleming	Jonathan Cape	1 April 1965	221 pp	Bond returns to London having been brainwashed by the Russians and assigned to kill M: the attempt ends in failure. To re-prove his worth, M sends him to Jamaica with the seemingly impossible mission of killing Francisco "Pistols" Scaramanga, a Cuban assassin who is believed to have killed several British secret agents. Bond uncovers a larger plot to de-stabilise the region using KGB support and, having killed the American gangsters and KGB representative, also completes his mission with the killing of Scaramanga.	
Octopussy and The Living Daylights	Ian Fleming	Jonathan Cape	23 June 1966	94 pp	The first edition contained only two stories: "Octopussy" and "The Living Daylights"; subsequent editions have also contained "The Property of a Lady" and "007 in New York".	
Octopussy and The Living Daylights	Ian Fleming	Jonathan Cape	23 June 1966	94 pp	"Octopussy": Bond tracks down a Second World War II officer who had murdered his friend to steal a cache of Nazi gold.	
Octopussy and The Living Daylights	Ian Fleming	Jonathan Cape	23 June 1966	94 pp	"The Living Daylights": Bond is assigned sniper duty, but when he sees the sniper is a beautiful woman, he shoots the butt of her rifle instead of killing her.	
Octopussy and The Living Daylights	Ian Fleming	Jonathan Cape	23 June 1966	94 pp	"The Property of a Lady": Bond visits Sotheby's to identify a KGB agent.	
Octopussy and The Living Daylights	Ian Fleming	Jonathan Cape	23 June 1966	94 pp	"007 in New York": Bond warns a female MI6 employee that her new boyfriend is a KGB agent.	

=== Short stories ===
In the summer of 1958, the CBS television network commissioned Fleming to write episodes of a television show based on the James Bond character. This deal came about after the success of the 1954 television adaptation of Casino Royale as an episode of the CBS television series Climax! Fleming agreed to the deal, and began to write outlines for the series; however, CBS later dropped the idea. In January and February 1959 Fleming adapted four of the television plots into short stories and added a fifth story he had written in the summer of 1958. The stories were originally titled The Rough with the Smooth, although this was changed to For Your Eyes Only for publication, which included the subtitle Five Secret Occasions in the Life of James Bond.

After Fleming's death, a second collection featuring two short stories was released, Octopussy and The Living Daylights. When the paperback edition of the book was published, "The Property of a Lady" was also included and, by 2002, "007 in New York" had been added to the book by Penguin Books.

James Bond short stories
Title	Earliest publication	Date	Ref.
"Quantum of Solace"	Cosmopolitan	May 1959	
"From a View to a Kill"	Daily Express (as "James Bond and the Murder Before Breakfast")	21–25 September 1959	
"The Hildebrand Rarity"	Playboy	March 1960	
"For Your Eyes Only"	For Your Eyes Only	11 April 1960	
"Risico"	Daily Express (as "The Double Take")	11–15 April 1960	
"The Living Daylights" (Note: Fleming originally titled "The Living Daylights" as "Trigger Finger", although when it first appeared, in The Sunday Times colour supplement of 4 February 1962, it was under the title of "The Living Daylights". It was also published in the June 1962 issue of the American magazine Argosy under the name "Berlin Escape".)	The Sunday Times colour supplement	4 February 1962	
"007 in New York" (Note: Originally titled "Reflections in a Carey Cadillac", it was changed to "Agent 007 in New York" for publication in the New York Herald Tribune but was subsequently renamed as "007 in New York" for the 1964 US editions of Thrilling Cities.)	New York Herald Tribune	October 1963	
"The Property of a Lady"	The Ivory Hammer (Sotheby's annual)	November 1963	
"Octopussy"	Posthumously serialised in Daily Express	4–8 October 1965	

=== Fictional chronologies ===
Independent scholar John Griswold constructed a "high-level chronology of James Bond's life", based on the logic of depicted events and actual periods referred to in the books. (Note: Griswold's work, Ian Fleming's James Bond: Annotations and Chronologies for Ian Fleming's Bond Stories, is classed as an approved reference book by Ian Fleming Publications, the family company of Ian Fleming and holders of the copyright to all Fleming's works. The work has been accepted by Raymond Benson, continuation author of Bond novels from 1997 to 2003 and writer of The James Bond Bedside Companion as a serious source and has been cited in academic works, such as Biddulph, Edward "Bond Was Not a Gourmet": An Archaeology of James Bond's Diet Source: Food, Culture and Society: An International Journal of Multidisciplinary Research, Volume 12, Number 2, June 2009.) This chronology differs from the publication sequence. Griswold also deliberately discounts the chronological significance of actual historic events mentioned in the novels and stories, arguing that Fleming made such references for effect without synchronising them accurately to his fiction. Fellow Bond-scholar Henry Chancellor also worked through the Bond chronology, which broadly agrees with Griswold, although there are differences. Chancellor noted that "Fleming was always vague about dates", although the novels are supposed to be set in order of publication.

Bond chronologies
Episode	Griswold chronology	Chancellor chronology
Casino Royale	May to July 1951, or May to July 1952	1951
Live and Let Die	January to February 1952	1952
Moonraker	May 1953	1953
Diamonds Are Forever	July to 1 August 1953	1954
From Russia, with Love	June to August 1954	1955
Dr. No	February to March 1956	1956
Goldfinger	April to June 1957	1957
"Risico"	October 1957	October 1957
"Quantum of Solace"	February 1958	October 1957
"The Hildebrand Rarity"	April 1958	April 1958
"From a View to a Kill"	May 1958	May 1958
"For Your Eyes Only"	September to October 1958	October 1958
Thunderball	May to June 1959	1959
"Octopussy"	July 1960	1960
"The Living Daylights"	September to October 1960	October 1959
"The Property of a Lady"	June 1961	June 1961
Chapters 1–5 of On Her Majesty's Secret Service	September 1961	1961
"007 in New York"	End of September 1961	1961
Chapters 10–14 of The Spy Who Loved Me (Note: James Bond is absent from chapters 1–9 and 15 of The Spy Who Loved Me, the events of which extend back some years, overlapping in time with much of the earlier Bond fiction. Bond does not appear until chapter 10, after which he figures as a central character.)	October 1961	1960
Chapters 6–27 of On Her Majesty's Secret Service	November 1961 to 1 January 1962	1961 to 1 January 1962
You Only Live Twice	August 1962 to April 1963	1962–1963
The Man With the Golden Gun	November 1963 to February 1964	1963

== Post-Fleming James Bond continuation novels ==
=== 1968–1979 ===
Following Fleming's death in 1964, Glidrose Productions, publishers of the James Bond novels and since renamed Ian Fleming Publications, approached author James Leasor to write a continuation novel, but he declined. Glidrose then commissioned Kingsley Amis, who, under the pseudonym of "Robert Markham", wrote Colonel Sun, which was published on 28 March 1968.

In 1973, Glidrose permitted the publication of John Pearson's fictional biography of Bond entitled James Bond: The Authorized Biography of 007. This book, written in the first person, posits that Bond was a real person about whom Ian Fleming wrote a series of adventures. This is the only Bond work where the author shares the copyright with Glidrose.

In 1977, the Eon Productions film The Spy Who Loved Me was released and, due to the radical differences between the film and the original novel of the same name, Eon Productions authorised a novelisation, James Bond, the Spy Who Loved Me. The 1979 film Moonraker, which other than the villain's name also substantially diverged from the source novel, was also produced in novel form, as James Bond and Moonraker; both books were written by screenwriter Christopher Wood.

Title	Author	Publisher	Date	Length (first edition)	Plot	Ref.
Colonel Sun	Kingsley Amis, as Robert Markham	Jonathan Cape	March 1968	255 pp	M is kidnapped and Bond follows the trail to a Greek Aegean island, where he, and Ariadne Alexandrou, a Greek Communist agent, plan to rescue him. M is held by Colonel Sun, a member of the Chinese People's Liberation Army who is in league with a former Nazi, Von Richter. Bond battles them both with the help of Ariadne and a friend of her father.	
James Bond: The Authorized Biography of 007	John Pearson	Sidgwick & Jackson	1973	317 pp	A fictional biography. Pearson begins the story with his discovery that James Bond exists; MI6 had assigned Ian Fleming to write novels based on the real agent. MI6 instructs Pearson to write 007's biography; he is introduced to a retired James Bond—who is in his fifties, yet healthy, sun-tanned, and with Honeychile Ryder, the heroine of Dr. No. Bond tells his life story to Pearson; this includes the death of Bond's parents, his first MI6 missions, and Bond's reaction to Fleming's books and the films about his adventures. References are made to most of the novels from Casino Royale up to and including Colonel Sun.	
James Bond, the Spy Who Loved Me (novelisation)	Christopher Wood	Jonathan Cape	July 1977	222 pp	A novelisation of The Spy Who Loved Me. Bond investigates the disappearance of British, American and Soviet ballistic-missile submarines, with the help of KGB agent Major Anya Amasova. The pair identify the culprit as Sigmund Stromberg, a shipping tycoon, scientist and anarchist, whom they battle and beat in his undersea Atlantis base.	
James Bond and Moonraker (novelisation)	Christopher Wood	Jonathan Cape	1979	221 pp	A novelisation of Moonraker. Bond investigates the theft of a Space Shuttle, leading him to Hugo Drax, the owner of the shuttle's manufacturing firm. Along with space scientist Dr. Holly Goodhead, Bond follows the trail into outer space to prevent a plot to wipe out the world population and to re-create humanity with a master race.	

=== 1981–1996: John Gardner ===
In the 1980s, the Bond series was revived with new novels by John Gardner, although initially he almost turned the series down. Between 1981 and 1996, Gardner went on to write sixteen Bond books in total; two of the books he wrote—Licence to Kill and GoldenEye—were novelisations of Eon Productions films of the same name. Gardner stated that he wanted "to bring Mr. Bond into the 1980s", although he retained the ages of the characters as they were when Fleming had left them. Even though Gardner kept the ages the same, he made Bond grey at the temples as a nod to the passing of the years. In 1996, Gardner retired from writing James Bond books due to ill health. With the influence of the American publishers, Putnam's, the Gardner novels showed an increase in the number of Americanisms used in the books, such as a waiter wearing "pants", rather than trousers, in The Man from Barbarossa. James Harker, writing in The Guardian, considered that the Gardner books were "dogged by silliness", giving examples of Scorpius, where much of the action is set in Chippenham, and Win, Lose or Die, where "Bond gets chummy with an unconvincing Maggie Thatcher".

Title	Author	Publisher	Date	Length (first edition)	Plot	Ref.
Licence Renewed	John Gardner	Jonathan Cape	May 1981	272 pp	Bond infiltrates the castle of Dr. Anton Murik, a nuclear physicist who is involved with a terrorist named Franco. Murik hired Franco to hijack six nuclear power stations to start a meltdown, but the terrorists are prevented from doing so by Bond who, posing as Murik, orders them to abort the mission.	
For Special Services	John Gardner	Jonathan Cape	September 1982	256 pp	Bond teams up with CIA agent Cedar Leiter, daughter of Felix, to investigate Markus Bismaquer, who is suspected of reviving SPECTRE. Bond establishes SPECTRE to take over the NORAD headquarters to gain control of America's military space satellite network. Bond foils the plot and finds that Bismaquer's wife, Nena, is the daughter of Blofeld and the head of SPECTRE.	
Icebreaker	John Gardner	Jonathan Cape	July 1983	256 pp	Bond is teamed with an alliance of agents from the CIA, the KGB, and Mossad to find and stop the leader of the National Socialist Action Army (NSAA), Count Konrad von Glöda, an ex-Nazi SS officer who now perceives himself as the new Adolf Hitler.	
Role of Honour	John Gardner	Jonathan Cape	October 1984	224 pp	Bond is sacked from MI6 to go undercover and is subsequently hired by SPECTRE. He joins Jay Autem Holy, a SPECTRE agent, and becomes involved in a plot to destabilise the Soviet Union and the United States, by forcing them to rid the world of their nuclear weapons: a plot he foils with the help of Miss 'Percy' Proud, a CIA agent.	
Nobody Lives for Ever	John Gardner	Jonathan Cape	June 1986	192 pp	A price is put on Bond's head by Tamil Rahani, the current leader of SPECTRE, who is dying from wounds received in Role of Honour. Bond's housekeeper, May, and Miss Moneypenny are both missing and Bond attempts to find them while avoiding the assassins who are attempting to kill him.	
No Deals, Mr. Bond	John Gardner	Jonathan Cape	May 1987	224 pp	Two women previously connected to a Cold War mission, are brutally murdered. Bond is subsequently sent by M, "off the record", to find the remaining members of the mission before they suffer the same fate.	
Scorpius	John Gardner	Hodder & Stoughton	July 1988	224 pp	Bond is threatened by a cult known as "The Meek Ones", who commit several acts of terrorism including multiple bombings and several assassinations of British politicians. Bond establishes the man behind the cult is an arms dealer, Vladimir Scorpius, who Bond locates and kills.	
Win, Lose or Die	John Gardner	Hodder & Stoughton	1989	220 pp	The Brotherhood of Anarchy and Secret Terrorism infiltrate and destroy a top-secret British Royal Navy aircraft carrier-based summit between American President George H. W. Bush, British Prime Minister Margaret Thatcher, and Soviet general secretary Mikhail Gorbachev: Bond breaks their hijack and rescues the three leaders.	
Licence to Kill (novelisation)	John Gardner	Coronet Books	1989	224 pp	A novelisation of Licence to Kill. The drug lord Franz Sanchez is caught by Bond and Felix Leiter, but escapes and ambushes Leiter and his wife Della: Leiter is maimed by a shark as Della is raped and killed. M orders Bond to a mission in Istanbul but Bond refuses and he is suspended and his 00 licence is revoked. Bond sets out on a revenge mission against Sanchez, surreptitiously helped by MI6 armourer Q	
Brokenclaw	John Gardner	Hodder & Stoughton	July 1990	192 pp	Bond investigates Brokenclaw, a half-Blackfoot, half-Chinese philanthropist and economic terrorist who is trying to start a worldwide economic collapse by attacking the main global currencies. Bond is challenged by Brokenclaw to a torture ritual known as o-kee-pa and kills him using bow and arrows.	
The Man from Barbarossa	John Gardner	Hodder & Stoughton	August 1991	231 pp	Bond teams up with Mossad, the French Secret Service, and the KGB to infiltrate a Russian terrorist group called the "Scales of Justice" who are attempting to supply Iraq with nuclear weapons before the United Nations-led coalition invades.	
Death Is Forever	John Gardner	Hodder & Stoughton	July 1992	224 pp	James Bond and CIA agent Elizabeth Zara "Easy" St. John are assigned to track down the surviving members of "Cabal", a Cold War-era intelligence network that received a mysterious and unauthorised signal to disband.	
Never Send Flowers	John Gardner	Hodder & Stoughton	July 1993	256 pp	Bond investigates the murder of a member of the Secret Service and connects the death to four political assassinations that take place within a week. Bond discovers a link with a former actor, David Dragonpol, who is responsible for the deaths.	
SeaFire	John Gardner	Hodder & Stoughton	August 1994	247 pp	Bond investigates Max Tarn, a billionaire business tycoon who is determined to reunite Germany under a new Fourth Reich. Tarn is also involved in eco-terrorism with a massive oil spill fire in Puerto Rico. Bond averts the ecological damage and kills Tarn.	
GoldenEye (novelisation)	John Gardner	Coronet Books	October 1995	218 pp	A novelisation of GoldenEye. Nine years after a mission that saw the death of his colleague Alec Trevelyan 006, Bond investigates the theft of a prototype Eurocopter Tiger helicopter and its subsequent use in the attack on the Russian command bunker that controls the GoldenEye satellite weapon. Bond finds the crime syndicate behind the theft and attack is run by 006, who is trying to destroy London's financial centre which will cover a large-scale bank theft.	
Cold	John Gardner	Hodder & Stoughton	May 1996	264 pp	The crash of a Boeing 747-400 at Dulles International Airport and the supposed death of Bond's friend and former lover, the Principessa Sukie Tempesta leads Bond on a personal revenge mission that uncovers a fanatical society, COLD: the Children of the Last Days.	

=== 1996–2002: Raymond Benson ===
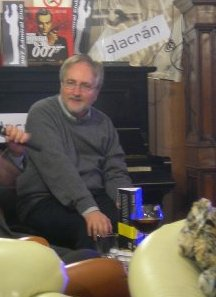
Raymond Benson, continuation Bond author

In 1996, American author Raymond Benson became the writer of the Bond novels. Benson had previously written The James Bond Bedside Companion, first published in 1984, and had also written scenarios and support material published in 1986 for the James Bond 007 tabletop role-playing game. By the time he moved on to other, non-Bond related projects in 2002, Benson had written six Bond novels, three novelisations, and three short stories. Benson followed Gardner's pattern of setting Bond in the contemporary timeframe of the 1990s and, according to academic Jeremy Black, had more echoes of Fleming's style than John Gardner.

Benson also changed Bond's gun back to the Walther PPK, put him behind the wheel of a Jaguar XK8 and made him swear more, which led Black to note that there was an increased level of crudity lacking in either Fleming or Gardner. However, commenting in The Australian, Peter Janson-Smith, Fleming's former literary agent, noted that Benson "has got the Fleming feel ... It's as close to Fleming as I have seen." The Peterborough Evening Telegraph agreed, stating that with Benson's 007, in keeping more with Fleming, "PC-ness goes out the window and it's a more ruthless Bond with bad habits." The Sunday Mercury in 1999 said, "Benson has made Bond less gimmicky, concentrating on the action rather than the gadgets. The result is a slick enough read for dedicated Bond fans who like blazing guns (Walthers, of course) and beautiful women" and Kirkus Reviews called Benson's 007 "a chip off the old block and, if not a gilt-edged Bond, at least a double-A".

Title	Author	Publisher	Date	Length (first edition)	Plot	Ref.
"Blast from the Past" (short story)	Raymond Benson	Playboy	January 1997	—	Bond receives a message, apparently from James Suzuki, his son, asking him to come to New York City on a matter of urgency. When Bond arrives, he finds his son murdered. He learns that James was killed in revenge by Irma Bunt for the murder of Blofeld. Bond meets and kills Bunt.	
Zero Minus Ten	Raymond Benson	Hodder & Stoughton	April 1997	259 pp	Ten days before Britain returns Hong Kong, a series of terrorist attacks occur. Bond establishes that behind them is wealthy shipping magnate Guy Thackeray, whose company is taken over by the Chinese. By way of revenge, Thackeray plans to detonate a nuclear weapon in Hong Kong: Bond disarms the bomb and kills Thackeray.	
Tomorrow Never Dies (novelisation)	Raymond Benson	Coronet Books	November 1997	213 pp	A novelisation of Tomorrow Never Dies. Bond investigates media baron Elliot Carver, who is trying to create news by causing a war between Britain and China, which would also allow him broadcasting rights in China. Bond joins forces with Wai Lin, a Chinese agent, to defeat Carver and avoid war.	
The Facts of Death	Raymond Benson	Hodder & Stoughton	May 1998	284 pp	Sinister organisation The Decada is behind a series of poisonings aimed at British and Turkish military personnel. Bond tracks the head of the organisation to Greece where he is trying to cause a war between Greece and Turkey, which Bond stops.	
"Midsummer Night's Doom" (short story)	Raymond Benson	Playboy	January 1999	9 pp	Bond attends a party at Playboy founder Hugh Hefner's Playboy Mansion in Beverly Hills, California where Ministry of Defence secrets are expected to be sold to a representative of the Russian Mafia.	
High Time to Kill	Raymond Benson	Hodder & Stoughton	May 1999	304 pp	A top secret British formula hidden in microfilm, codenamed "Skin 17" was stolen by two traitors who plan to sell it to the terrorist organisation "The Union". The microfilm is on a plane that crashes in the Himalayas and Bond climbs Mount Kangchenjunga to retrieve it. He battles a traitor in the climbing team but retrieves the secret.	
"Live at Five" (short story)	Raymond Benson	TV Guide (American edition)	November 1999	—	On the way to a date with a female television news reporter, 007 recalls how he once helped a Russian figure skating champion defect in full view of television cameras.	
The World Is Not Enough (novelisation)	Raymond Benson	Hodder & Stoughton	November 1999	200 pp	A novelisation of The World Is Not Enough. Bond is tasked with protecting Elektra King after the murder of her father inside the MI6 building. Bond establishes a connection between her head of security and the international terrorist Renard, who is stealing plutonium to destroy Istanbul on behalf of Elektra. Bond kills both Renard and Elektra.	
DoubleShot	Raymond Benson	Hodder & Stoughton	May 2000	320 pp	After he foiled their plans, the terrorist organisation The Union targets Bond with a plan to plunge Britain into war and destroy Bond's reputation in the process by having a Bond double kill the British Prime Minister and the Governor of Gibraltar. Bond uncovers the plan and kills the double, preventing the assassinations.	
Never Dream of Dying	Raymond Benson	Hodder & Stoughton	November 2001	320 pp	Bond is again in the hunt for The Union and is chasing Le Gérant, the Blind head of the organisation. After a police raid goes wrong René Mathis goes after Le Gérant, followed by Bond.	
The Man with the Red Tattoo	Raymond Benson	Hodder & Stoughton	May 2002	320 pp	Bond is in Japan to protect the prime minister at a conference and to investigate mysterious deaths in the McMahon family, who ran pharmaceutical giant CureLab. Bond reunites with Tiger Tanaka to pursue terrorist Goro Yoshida who is using biological weapons to punish Western society and plots an end to western domination. Bond kills him and negates any threats.	
Die Another Day (novelisation)	Raymond Benson	Coronet Books	November 2002	245 pp	A novelisation of Die Another Day. Bond investigates the North Korean Colonel Tan-Sun Moon and tracks his assistant Tang Lin Zao to the clinic where his appearance is altered. Bond finds diamonds on Zao bearing the crest of British billionaire Gustav Graves and establishes Graves is the facially-reconstructed Moon, who is attempting to reunite North and South Korea by force, which Bond stops, killing Moon in the process.	

=== 2008–present ===
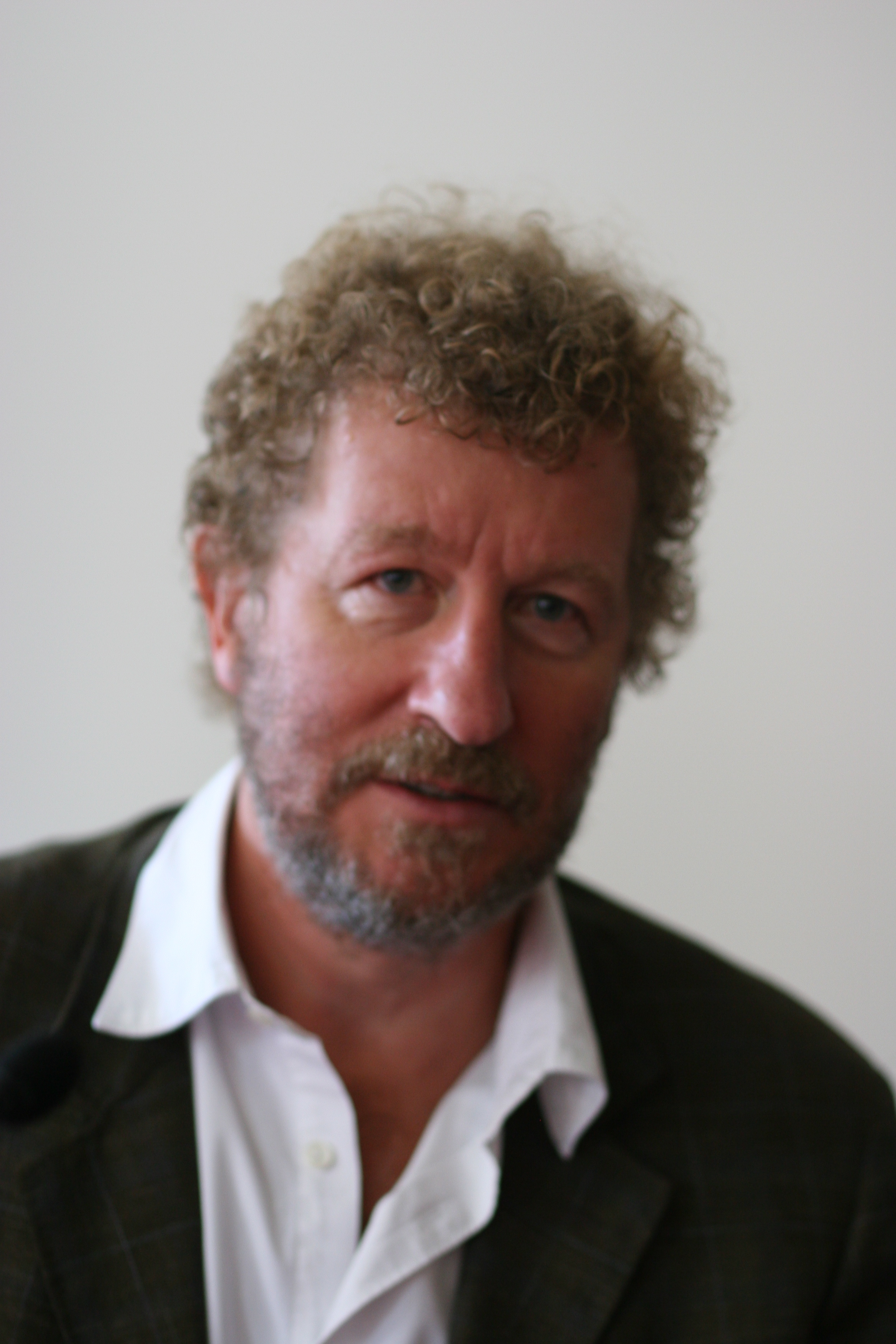
Sebastian Faulks, author of Devil May Care

Glidrose twice approached Lee Child, author of the Jack Reacher novels, about writing a Bond novel, but he turned them down. Ian Fleming Publications then commissioned Sebastian Faulks to write a continuation novel, which was released on 28 May 2008, the 100th anniversary of Ian Fleming's birth. The book—titled Devil May Care—was published in the UK by Penguin Books and by Doubleday in the US. Faulks ignored the timeframe established by Gardner and Benson and instead reverted to that used by Fleming and Amis, basing his novel in the 1960s; he also managed to use a number of the cultural touchstones of the sixties in the book. Faulks was said to be true to Bond's original character and background, providing "a Flemingesque hero" who drove a battleship grey 1967 T-series Bentley.

The American writer Jeffery Deaver was then commissioned by Ian Fleming Publications to produce Carte Blanche, which was published on 26 May 2011. The book updated Bond working for a post-9/11 agency, independent of MI5 or MI6. On 26 September 2013 the novel Solo, by William Boyd was published in the UK and by HarperCollins in Canada and the US; the book was once again set in the 1960s. In October 2014 it was announced that Anthony Horowitz was to write a further Bond instalment. The novel, titled Trigger Mortis, is set in the 1950s, and it contains material written, but previously unreleased, by Fleming. In February 2018, it was announced that a second Horowitz novel, again building upon unpublished Fleming and this time a prequel to Casino Royale, titled Forever and a Day would be published by Jonathan Cape on 31 May 2018. On 28 May 2021, it was announced that Horowitz is writing a third James Bond book, taking place after Ian Fleming's final Bond novel, The Man with the Golden Gun. On 16 December 2021, it was announced the novel titled With a Mind to Kill was set for release on 26 May 2022.

On His Majesty's Secret Service by Charlie Higson was released in May 2023 to tie in with the coronation of King Charles III. Higson is now the current continuation author writing King Zero which will be out in September 2026.

Title	Author	Publisher	Date	Length (first edition)	Plot	Ref.
Devil May Care	Sebastian Faulks	Penguin	May 2008	295 pp	Bond investigates Julius Gorner, a businessman who is producing heroin that threatens England, as well as wanting to attack the Soviets, who will retaliate against Britain. Bond foils the plot and kills Gorner.	
Carte Blanche	Jeffrey Deaver	Hodder & Stoughton	May 2011	448 pp	Bond investigates the activities of Severan Hydt, a waste-disposal magnate. Hydt had been tasked by an American pharmaceutical company to detonate a device at a British university to kill a researcher who was on the verge of creating a drug to cure cancer. Bond foiled the plot and a second plot to use food aid to give the Sudanese government a pretext to go to war with rebels and prevent Southern Sudan from seceding.	
Solo	William Boyd	Jonathan Cape	September 2013	336 pp	Bond tries to stop a civil war in the fictional country of Zanzarim. Although the civil war finishes without Bond's help, he is shot and left for dead by a mercenary, Kobus Breed, and Efua Blessing Ogilvy-Grant, who Bond thought was the MI6 representative in the country. Bond traces the pair to the US, and goes on a revenge mission to kill them; he is picked up by the CIA who inform him Ogilvy-Grant is a CIA operative. He meets Ogilvy-Grant, who informs him that she shot to wound, not kill. Bond traces Breed, who has been smuggling heroin into the country.	
Trigger Mortis	Anthony Horowitz	Orion Publishing	September 2015	320 pp	Bond takes on a mission involving the Space Race two weeks after the events of Goldfinger, encountering Pussy Galore along the way.	
Forever and a Day	Anthony Horowitz	Jonathan Cape	May 2018	288 pp	A prequel to Casino Royale, where James Bond is given his licence to kill and is sent to find out who killed the former Agent 007 and why. His investigation leads him into a compound that ostensibly is manufacturing high-tech colour film, but in reality, is creating a much more sinister product.	
With a Mind to Kill	Anthony Horowitz	Vintage Books	May 2022	288 pp	A sequel to Ian Fleming's The Man with the Golden Gun, where M has been murdered, and his assassin is in custody. James Bond infiltrates a crime ring of former SMERSH agents in an operation that could change the balance of world power.	
On His Majesty's Secret Service	Charlie Higson	Ian Fleming Publications	May 2023	176 pp	Bond is tasked with foiling an attempt to disrupt the coronation of King Charles III.	
King Zero	Charlie Higson	Ian Fleming Publications	September 2026	400 pp	Bond investigates the murder of an agent in the Saudi desert.	
All In	Dan Jones	Ian Fleming Publications	December 2026		Bond is on a mission in Ceylon in 1954 with Tiffany Case. Set between Diamonds are Forever and From Russia, With Love.	

== Spin-offs ==
=== Young Bond series ===
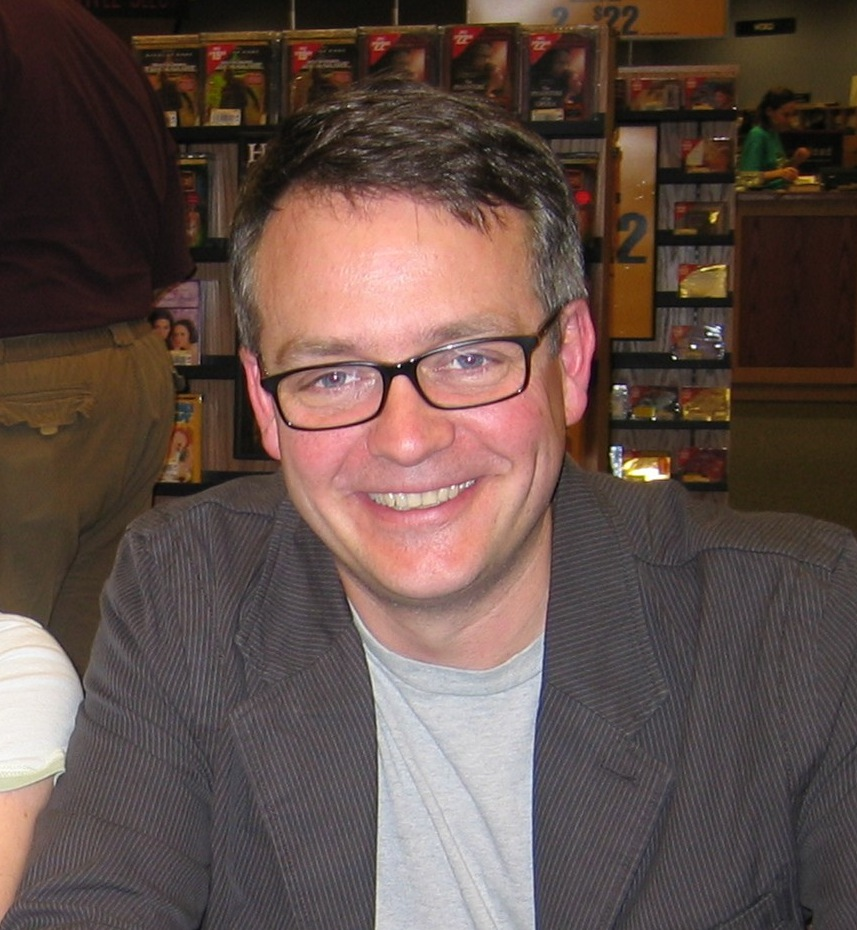
Charlie Higson, author of the Young Bond series

The Young Bond series of novels was started by Charlie Higson and, between 2005 and 2009, five novels and one short story were published. The first Young Bond novel, SilverFin was also adapted and released as a graphic novel on 2 October 2008 by Puffin Books. Comic book artist Kev Walker illustrated Higson's novel. Young Bond is set in the 1930s, which would fit the chronology with that of Fleming.

I deliberately steered clear of anything post-Fleming. My books are designed to fit in with what Fleming wrote and nothing else. I also didn't want to be influenced by any of the other books ... for now, my Bible is Fleming.

— Charlie Higson

Higson stated that he was instructed by the Fleming estate to ignore all other interpretations of Bond, except the original Fleming version. As the background to Bond's childhood, Higson used Bond's obituary in You Only Live Twice as well as his own and Fleming's childhoods. In forming the early Bond character, Higson created the origins of some of Bond's character traits, including his love of cars and fine wine.

In October 2013 Ian Fleming Publications announced that Stephen Cole would continue the series, with the first edition scheduled to be released in Autumn 2014. The title was later confirmed as Shoot to Kill with a release date of 6 November 2014, and it was further confirmed that Cole would be credited as Steve Cole for the release.

Title	Author	Publisher	Date	Length (first edition)	Plot	Ref.
SilverFin	Charlie Higson	Puffin Books	March 2005	372 pp	Bond meets Lord Randolph Hellebore, an arms dealer and father of fellow Etonian George Hellebore; Hellebore has a castle near Bond's new home in Scotland and, while on holiday, Bond investigates the disappearance of a local boy Alfie Kelly. Bond soon finds out that Hellebore is involved in creating a pill to create better and stronger soldiers by manipulating the endocrine system and had tested this pill on Alfie, but Alfie had died. With help, Bond brings an end to the tests.	
Blood Fever	Charlie Higson	Puffin Books	January 2006	384 pp	While on a school trip to Sardinia, Bond comes up against the Millenaria, a secret Italian society that has plans to restore the Roman Empire. Bond meets Count Ugo Carnifex, the head of the Millenaria who tortures him by using mosquitoes. Bond escapes, rescuing the sister of a fellow Etonian in the process, and Carnifex's castle is destroyed by an embittered employee.	
Double or Die	Charlie Higson	Puffin Books	January 2007	389 pp	A master from Eton is kidnapped and sends a letter back to his boys with cryptic clues about his kidnap. Bond's roommate Pritpal Nandra solves most of the clues while Bond and fellow school friend Perry Mandeville go in search of the missing master. Bond finds the master, who has been kidnapped by the Russians to build a prototype computer, and, with help, manages to rescue him.	
Hurricane Gold	Charlie Higson	Puffin Books	September 2007	372 pp	Bond is on holiday with his aunt when the house in which he is staying is violently burgled and two children are kidnapped. Bond gives chase and is captured, but convinces them he is a local street thug and they allow him to join the gang. One of the children is ill and a villain has a change of heart and smuggles him away to a local hospital: Bond eventually rescues the second child. The pair then chase the one remaining gangster to an island retreat for villains where Bond runs La Avenida de Muerte to escape.	
By Royal Command	Charlie Higson	Puffin Books	September 2008	354 pp	Bond travels to Kitzbühel, Austria on an Eton school trip, but is under surveillance for the journey. On his return to Eton Bond foils a plot to assassinate King George V. Still under surveillance, Bond falls in love with a communist maid at Eton and they are eventually forced to flee back to Austria, from where the plot originated.	
"A Hard Man to Kill" (short story)	Charlie Higson	Puffin Books	October 2009	64 pp	Bond and his Aunt Charmian are travelling back from the Caribbean on the SS Colombie but come across a villain named Emil Lefebvre and a mysterious hooded convict named Caiboche.	
Shoot to Kill	Steve Cole	Random House	November 2014	304 pp	After being thrown out of Eton, Bond must briefly attend Dartington Hall, a progressive school in Devon. Here he makes new friends and enemies before leaving the UK for a most extraordinary field trip by zeppelin to Hollywood, Los Angeles where deadly challenges await.	
Heads You Die	Steve Cole	Random House	May 2016	320 pp	James' Cuban holiday finds him meeting up with old enemies and making new girlfriends as he works to prevent the deaths of thousands of innocent lives.	
Strike Lightning	Steve Cole	Random House	September 2016	288 pp	Bond is now enrolled at Fettes, in Scotland, and witnesses something that he believes is murder. Nobody believes him except some of his classmates, who agree to help, only to find themselves in mortal danger as well.	
Red Nemesis	Steve Cole	Random House	May 2017	320 pp	Bond has an opportunity to learn more about his parents, by way of an agent that knew them. Much confusion ensues, and he ends up alone in Moscow on the trail of truth.	

=== The Moneypenny Diaries ===
The Moneypenny Diaries are a series of novels and short stories chronicling the life of Miss Jane Moneypenny, M's personal secretary in Ian Fleming's James Bond series; it is considered an official spin-off of the Bond books. The diaries are penned by Samantha Weinberg under the pseudonym Kate Westbrook, who is depicted as the book's "editor".

Title	Author	Publisher	Date	Length (first edition)	Plot	Ref.
Guardian Angel	Samantha Weinberg	John Murray	10 October 2005	294 pp	The first diary fills in the gaps between a number of agent 007's missions including the period between On Her Majesty's Secret Service and You Only Live Twice, but also includes an entire backstory for Moneypenny. For the first time since Ian Fleming introduced the character alongside Bond in Casino Royale, Moneypenny is given a first name: Jane.	
Secret Servant	Samantha Weinberg	John Murray	2 November 2006	324 pp		
Final Fling	Samantha Weinberg	John Murray	1 May 2008	264 pp		
Secret Chapters	Samantha Weinberg	Ian Fleming Publications	10 September 2020	20 pp		

=== Double O trilogy ===
Kim Sherwood was commissioned by the Ian Fleming estate to write a trilogy of novels set in the world of James Bond. Although some of Fleming's ideas are used, Bond himself appears in flashbacks in the first two novels and is the main character for Hurricane Room.

Title	Author	Publisher	Date	Length (first edition)	Plot	Ref.
Double or Nothing	Kim Sherwood	HarperCollins	1 September 2022	432 pp	Bond has gone missing, so three newly minted 00 agents are charged with finding him.	
A Spy Like Me	Kim Sherwood	Ian Fleming Publications	25 April 2024	384 pp		
Hurricane Room	Kim Sherwood	Ian Fleming Publications	26 May 2026			

=== Felix Leiter series ===
In 2025 Benson released a new instalment in the world of Bond, in the form of The Hook and the Eye, which features Bond's CIA colleague Felix Leiter as the main character. The story originally released on 27 May as a ten-part serialised e-book released every two weeks. It is set to conclude on 30 September, before releasing in paperback form on 2 October.

Title	Author	Publisher	Date	Length (first edition)	Plot	Ref.
The Hook and the Eye	Raymond Benson	Ian Fleming Publications	2 October 2025	292 pp		

=== The Q Mysteries ===
Title	Author	Publisher	Date	Length (first edition)	Plot	Ref.
Quantum of Menace	Vaseem Khan	Ian Fleming Publications	23 October 2025	384 pp		
The Man with the Golden Compass	Vaseem Khan	Ian Fleming Publications	22 October 2026			

=== James Bond and the Secret Agent Academy series ===
Title	Author	Publisher	Date	Length (first edition)	Plot	Ref.
James Bond and the Secret Agent Academy	M. W. Craven	Ian Fleming Publications	April 2027	336 pp		

== See also ==
- The Moneypenny Diaries
- Bibliography of works on James Bond
