= Danger Society: The Young Bond Dossier =

Book by Charlie Higson

- First edition
- Author: Charlie Higson
- Illustrator: Kev Walker
- Language: English
- Series: James Bond / Young Bond
- Genre: Spy fiction
- Publisher: Puffin Books
- Publication date: 29 October 2009
- Publication place: United Kingdom
- Media type: Print (Hardcover)
- Pages: 249
- ISBN: 978-0-14-132768-6
- OCLC: 428776247
- Preceded by: By Royal Command

Danger Society: The Young Bond Dossier is a companion to the Young Bond series of novels written by Charlie Higson. The book contains in-depth character profiles to the cars, the weapons and the exotic locations, plus facts, statistics, photographs, maps, and illustrations by Kev Walker. The book also includes an original Young Bond short story by Charlie Higson titled "A Hard Man to Kill". The story is set between the books Hurricane Gold and By Royal Command and involves James Bond travelling back to London aboard the French ocean liner SS Colombie. It is the longest James Bond short story yet written. An extract from the story appeared in the paperback edition of By Royal Command.

Danger Society: The Young Bond Dossier was released by Puffin Books on 29 October 2009.

== Official summary ==
Puffin Books promotional blurb

Everything you ever wanted to know about the boy, who became the man, who became the legend.

Featuring a brand-new story by Charlie Higson, Danger Society: The Young Bond Dossier is the complete and definitive guide to the world and adventures of Young Bond.

Packed with information – from in-depth character profiles to the cars, the weapons and the exotic locations, plus facts, statistics, photographs, maps, and illustrations by Kev Walker – this book is both a must-have for Young Bond fans and a perfect introduction to the megaselling series.

== See also ==
- Outline of James Bond
