= Suite 16 =

Suite 16 may refer to:

- Suite 16 (album)
- Suite 16 (film)
- Suite 16 (band), Norwegian boy band
