= Precious stone (disambiguation) =

A precious stone is another term for a gemstone.

Precious Stone or Precious Stones may also refer to:

- Precious Stone, a fictional character in the James Bond story Hurricane Gold
- Precious Stone (religious group), an African-initiated church
- Precious Stones (film), a 1918 German silent drama film
