= Shoot to kill =

Shoot to kill may refer to:

== Law ==
- Deadly force, a general concept in the theory of self-defence (where "shooting to kill" is aiming one's shots with the specific intention of causing fatal injury)
- Operation Kratos, a set of tactics by the Metropolitan Police Service of London to kill suspected terrorists
- Postenpflicht, a general order at Nazi concentration camps requiring guards to shoot to kill
- Schießbefehl, an order given to border guards in East Germany between 1960 and 1989, directing them to use lethal force against anyone trying to cross the inner German border
- Shoot-to-kill policy in Northern Ireland, under which suspects were alleged to have been deliberately killed without any attempt to arrest them

== Film and TV ==
- Shoot to Kill (1947 film), a black-and-white film noir
- Shoot to Kill (1960 film), a British crime film directed by Michael Winner
- Shoot to Kill (1988 film), an adventure thriller film starring Sidney Poitier
- Shoot to Kill (1990 film), a drama-documentary on the actions of the police in Northern Ireland
- "Shoot to Kill" (Between the Lines), a 1994 television episode

== Music ==
- Shoot to Kill, a mixtape by rapper Mickey Avalon
- Shoot to Kill (G-Unit album), an album by G-Unit eventually released as T.O.S: Terminate on Sight
- Shoot to Kill (X-Pistols album), a 2011 album by X-Pistols

== Other ==
- Shoot to Kill (novel), a 2014 novel by Steve Cole
- Final Boss (Halo team), professional Halo team founded as Shoot to Kill (StK)
