= Stephen Cole (writer) =

British sci-fi and children's author

Stephen Cole (born 1971) (also credited as Steve Cole, Tara Samms and Paul Grice) is an English author of children's books and science fiction. He was also in charge of BBC Worldwide's merchandising of the BBC Television series Doctor Who between 1997 and 1999 and as executive producer on the Big Finish Productions range of Doctor Who audio dramas.

In 2013, Ian Fleming Publications announced that Cole would continue the Young Bond series first penned by Charlie Higson, with the addition of four new books to the series. The first of these, Shoot to Kill, was published in the UK in November 2014, where Cole is credited as 'Steve Cole'.

== Early life and career ==
Cole was brought up in rural Bedfordshire and attended the University of East Anglia between 1989 and 1992, where he studied English literature and film studies, graduating with first class honours. After a brief time working in local radio with BBC Radio Bedfordshire (now Three Counties) he became a junior assistant at BBC Children's Magazines in 1993, and by 1996 he was Group Editor of Pre-School Magazines. In the summer of 1996 he wrote his first children's books: Cars on Mars, Alien Olympics, School on Saturn and Mucky Martians, a collection of pop-up poetry books published by Levinson the following year.

At the time, BBC Books had received rights to publish Doctor Who fiction after the release of the 1996 Doctor Who TV Movie – and that a new range of Eighth Doctor Adventures and Past Doctor Adventures would be commissioned. Cole applied for the role of Project Editor of Sci-Fi Titles as he was a fan of the programme, and was successful.

After the first six books in the Eighth Doctor Adventures range were released, Cole also edited the BBC's Short Trips short story collections, for which he began to write under the pseudonyms of "Tara Samms" and "Paul Grice". He also wrote two novels under his friend's name, Michael Collier. He has since published other work under these pen-names, including the 2003 Doctor Who novella Frayed, part of a series published by Telos Publishing Ltd. He has also written several short stories and audio plays for Big Finish Productions.

In addition to the books he also commissioned and abridged stories for inclusion on various Doctor Who talking books and selected TV stories to be released on home video.

== Original titles ==
Worn down by the grind of commissioning and editing 22 80,000 word novels per year as well as producing nonfiction titles, audiobooks and videos, Cole shifted roles in the Children's department to become Special Development Editor in 1999, commissioning and writing children's books tying into series such as Walking With Dinosaurs and Microsoap. He retained responsibility for certain of the Doctor Who novels on a freelance basis before passing them to the care of author-editor Justin Richards.

Leaving BBC Worldwide in October 1999 Cole moved to be Managing Editor for Ladybird Books. But while he continued to write TV and film tie-ins he missed involvement with fiction. After a stint as senior editor at Simon and Schuster Children's Books (where he commissioned books from Who writers Paul Magrs and Justin Richards) he went freelance in 2002, editing fewer books in favour of writing more of his own. Cole's first original fiction was a series called The Wereling, a trilogy of young adult horror books published by Bloomsbury. He followed this up with a further trilogy detailing the adventures of misfit criminal teen genius Jonah Wish and his friends – Thieves Like Us, Thieves Till We Die (also released as The Aztec Code) and The Bloodline Cipher. He has also written several more Doctor Who titles, including four tying in with the new series.

Cole's most successful titles to date are the Astrosaurs children's books, published under the name Steve Cole. The first two titles were published 3 February 2005. So far there are 22 Astrosaurs books available including a special edition book written especially for World Book Day 2007 (published 1 March 2007). Astrosaurs was followed up by the series Cows In Action (first two titles published 3 May 2007). There are twelve Cows In Action books published to date. The Astrosaurs spin-off series, Astrosaurs Academy, began in May 2008 and has 8 books to date.

== Works ==
=== Astrosaurs ===
- Riddle of the Raptors, published 1 February 2005
- The Hatching Horror, published 1 February 2005
- The Seas of Doom, published 5 May 2005
- The Mind-Swap Menace, published 4 August 2005
- The Skies of Fear, published 5 January 2006
- The Space Ghosts, published 2 March 2006
- The Day of the Dino Droids, published 1 June 2006
- The Terror Bird Trap, published 3 August 2006
- The Teeth of the T-Rex, published 1 March 2007
- The Planet of Peril, published 5 April 2007
- The Star Pirates, published 7 June 2007
- The Claws of Christmas, published 4 October 2007
- The Sun Snatchers, published 7 February 2008
- The Revenge of The Fang, published 7 August 2008
- The Carnivore Curse, published 1 January 2009
- The Dreams of Dread published 4 June 2009
- The Robot Raiders published 28 January 2010
- The Twist of Time published 29 April 2010
- The Sabre Tooth Secret published 3 February 2011
- The Forest of Evil published 4 August 2011
- Megabookasaurus! published 3 September 2009
- Earth Attack! published 6 October 2011
- The T.rex Invasion published 26 April 2012
- The Castle of Frankensaur published 19 November 2012
- Astrosaurs vs Cows In Action: The Dinosaur Moo-tants, published 3 October 2013, (featuring the Cows In Action)
- Note: Steve Cole has also written a series on Tegg's training - see Astrosaurs Academy

=== Cows in Action ===
- The Ter-moo-nators, published 3 May 2007
- The Moo-my's Curse, published 3 May 2007
- The Roman Moo-stery, published 6 September 2007
- The Wild West Moo-nster, published 4 January 2008
- World War Moo, published 7 August 2008
- Battle for Christ-moos, published 2 October 2008
- The Pirate Mootiny, published 2 April 2009
- The Moo-gic of Merlin, published 6 August 2009
- The Victorian Moo-ders, published 1 January 2010
- The Moo-Limpics 4 October, published 2010
- First Cows on the Mooon, published 2 June 2011
- The Viking Emoo-gency, published 2 February 2012
- Astrosaurs vs Cows In Action: The Dinosaur Moo-tants, published 3 October 2013, (featuring the Astrosaurs)

=== Astrosaurs Academy ===
- Destination: Danger! – 1 May 2008
- Contest Carnage – 1 May 2008
- Terror Underground – 4 September 2008
- Jungle Horror – 5 February 2009
- Deadly Drama- 2 July 2009
- Christmas Crisis - 1 October 2009
- Volcano Invaders! - 1 April 2010
- Space Kidnap - 3 March 2011

=== The Slime Squad ===
- The Slime Squad vs The Toxic Teeth
- The Slime Squad vs The Fearsome Fists
- The Slime Squad vs The Cyber Poos
- The Slime Squad vs The Supernatural Squid
- The Slime Squad vs The Killer Socks
- The Slime Squad vs The Last Chance Chicken
- The Slime Squad vs The Alligator Army
- The Slime Squad vs The Conquering Conks

=== The Hunting, or Z Trilogy ===
- Z. Rex
- Z. Raptor
- Z. Apocalypse

=== Tripwire ===
- Tripwire
- Tripwire DEATHWING

=== Young Adult fiction ===
==== The Wereling Trilogy ====
- The Wereling: Wounded 2003
- The Wereling II: Prey 2004
- The Wereling III: Resurrection 2004

==== Thieves Like Us Trilogy ====
- Thieves Like Us 2006
- The Aztec Code 2007 (also published as Thieves Till We Die)
- The Bloodline Cipher 2008

==== Young James Bond ====
- Shoot to Kill, 2014
- Heads You Die, 2016
- Strike Lightning, 2016
- Red Nemesis, 2017

=== Doctor Who novels ===
- Longest Day (written as Michael Collier), 1998
- The Taint(written as Michael Collier), 1999
- Parallel 59 (with Natalie Dallaire), 2000
- The Ancestor Cell (with Peter Anghelides), 2000
- Vanishing Point, 2001
- The Shadow in the Glass (with Justin Richards), 2001
- Ten Little Aliens, 2002
- Timeless, 2003
- Frayed, 2003
- The Monsters Inside, 2005
- To the Slaughter, 2005
- The Feast of the Drowned, 2006
- The Art of Destruction, 2006
- Sting of the Zygons, 2007
- Combat Magicks, 2018
- Time Lord Victorious: The Knight, The Fool and the Dead, 2020

=== Miscellaneous TV tie-in children's books ===
- The Adventures of Mr. Bean: Bear Essentials 2002
- The Adventures of Mr. Bean: No Pets! 2002
- Sea Captain Ned 2004
- The Thirsty Penguin 2004
- Josie's Big Jump 2004

== Works published by Big Finish ==
=== Bernice Summerfield novels ===
- The Gods of the Underworld (Bernice Summerfield)

=== Doctor Who plays ===
- The Land of the Dead (Fifth Doctor) (1999)
- The Apocalypse Element (Sixth Doctor) (2001)
- The Wormery (Sixth Doctor, Iris Wildthyme with Paul Magrs) (2004)
- Fitz's Story (Eighth Doctor) part of The Company of Friends (2008)
- The Whispering Forest (Fifth Doctor) (2010)
- Kiss of Death (Fifth Doctor) (2011)
- Masquerade (Fifth Doctor) (2014)

=== Other plays ===
- The Plague Herds of Excelis (Bernice Summerfield, Iris Wildthyme)
- The Dance of the Dead (Bernice Summerfield)
- The Relics of Jegg-Sau (Bernice Summerfield)
- Gallifrey: Square One (Gallifrey)
- Gallifrey: Spirit (Gallifrey)
- Gallifrey: Fractures (Gallifrey)
- The Devil in Ms Wildthyme (Iris Wildthyme)
- Many Happy Returns (Bernice Summerfield; with Xanna Eve Chown, Paul Cornell, Stephen Fewell, Simon Guerrier, Scott Handcock, Rebecca Levene, Jacqueline Rayner, Justin Richards, Miles Richardson, Eddie Robson and Dave Stone)
