= The Wereling Trilogy =

Series of horror novels written by Stephen Cole

- The Wereling: Wounded (2003); The Wereling: Prey (2004); The Wereling: Resurrection (2004)
- Author: Stephen Cole
- Language: English
- Genre: Speculative Fiction
- Publisher: Bloomsbury Publishing PLC
- Published: 2003–2004
- Media type: Print (paperback), e-book
- No. of books: 3

The Wereling Trilogy is a series of young adult, horror novels written by author Stephen Cole. The books revolve around two teenagers, newly turned werewolf, Tom Anderson and his friend Kate Folan, a pureblood werewolf.

== Novels ==
=== The Wereling: Wounded ===
"The moon was just a soft glow through the flimsy curtains in Kate's bedroom, but she feared even that intrusion. She pushed sweat-drenched hair from her eyes and turned on her bedside light. Looked around at the familiar things in the room. Told herself she was normal. Normal for now...

Kate is part of one very unusual family - but a family that makes her feel like an outcast. The last place that Tom Anderson wants to be is on holiday with his family, especially when he could have been going away with his friends. But these two teenagers are destined to meet, unhappily united in a cause that is both dangerous and horrifying..."

=== The Wereling: Prey ===
"A wereling is a resister whose humanity and compassion prevails in the 'wolf.' Which seemed to mean that when the change was on him, Tom could hold on to some struggling, screaming human part of his nature that loathed what he had become.

And Tom wants nothing more than to be a normal teenager again. He and Kate have made it to New York and escaped Kate's werewolf mother, for now. But it's not the safe haven they had hoped for. Something sinister is stalking the streets, preying on the vulnerable - people with no place to stay, no money, no one to ask for help - people like Tom and Kate. They are here to find the medicine man, Jicaque, who can free Tom from his wereling instincts, but before they can track Jicaque down it looks like they might be next on the menu..."

=== The Wereling: Resurrection ===
"It had been Adam Blood who'd informed them that the lupines were gathering in Chicago - that something big was going down. He'd already warned them to stay well away - he'd certainly intended to.

Tom and Kate know that Chicago is the last place they should head for and that's exactly why they decide to go. Takapa is planning to resurrect a terrible force from the past, one which will help him bring 'wolves out of the shadows forever. Lupines are gathering from all over the world, answering Takapa's call to witness a revolution - one which Tom and Kate will do everything in their power to prevent."

== Characters ==
=== Tom Anderson ===
Tom is a 16-year-old male who was bitten by Wesley Folan in the forest and taken to the Folans’ home to be Kate's mate. Tom is a silverblood which gives him incredible resistance to the wolf infection, after he was bitten it took Marcie Folan a whole month of feeding him specific herbs to break his resistance, therefore Tom is known as a wereling (which is a silverblood who has been turned, but retains part of his humanity when he transforms). Tom hates being part wolf and for most of the series he is trying to find a cure to being a werewolf. He is in love with Kate Folan, but he is unable to have a relationship with her because of what he has become. Kate has said that because Tom is not a killer neither is the wolf inside of him, which puts him at a disadvantage during most fights. His wolf form is well proportioned, has lustrous black fur and his normal almost black eyes.

=== Kate Folan ===
Kate is the 17-year-old daughter of Marcie and Hal Folan. She is a pureblood werewolf and therefore will not transform into her wolf form unless she sleeps with another wolf, which is something that she has sworn will never happen because she loathes the idea of becoming like her mother. She is in love with Tom, however a relationship between them is currently impossible because he is a werewolf and if they slept together she would turn into a proper werewolf. She is also described a being quite beautiful and very smart. Her online alias is Troll Lover.

=== Marcie Folan ===
She is Kate's mother, a pureblood and one of the main antagonists in the series. During most of the series her two main goals are to kill Tom to get revenge on him for killing her son Wesley during a fight and to find Kate and marry her off to Takapa, to create a solid alliance with him. She is somewhat crazy and can't resist her bloodlust. Her wolf form has greenish gold eyes and has a scrawny build.

=== Papa Takapa ===
He is a pureblood and one of the main antagonists in the series. He wants to bring werewolves out of hiding and take over the humans. He and Marcie Folan have an alliance where Kate is meant to be given to him as his mate. His wolf form is a huge albino wolf.

=== Jicaque ===
He is a medicine man who has the ability to cure newly turned werewolves as long as they truly want to be cured, he is also a silverblood. For most of the series Tom and Kate were looking for him so that they could cure Tom of being a werewolf. Eventually when they found him in New York he helped them stop an army newly turned wolves and cured most of them, however when Kate asked him to cure Tom, he refused, saying that Tom did not truly wish to be cured yet. The next time he appeared was at the very end of the series and he helped defeat Takapa and the original wolf Peter Stubbe for good.
