= Double or Die =

2007 novel by Charlie Higson

Double or Die...
- First edition UK paperback
- Author: Charlie Higson
- Language: English
- Series: James Bond / Young Bond
- Genre: Spy novel
- Publisher: Puffin Books
- Publication date: 4 January 2007
- Publication place: United Kingdom
- Media type: Print (Paperback)
- Pages: 389 pp
- ISBN: 0-14-132203-9
- OCLC: 71541562
- Preceded by: Blood Fever
- Followed by: Hurricane Gold

Double Or Die is the third novel in the Young Bond series depicting Ian Fleming's superspy James Bond as a teenager in the 1930s. The novel, written by Charlie Higson, was released in the United Kingdom by Puffin Books on 4 January 2007. A special hardcover "Limited Collector's Edition" was released as a Waterstones Bookstore exclusive on 25 October 2007.

The title was announced on 3 January 2007 at the official book launch at Waterstone's in Piccadilly, London. The alternative titles which were available for the public to vote for were "N.E.M.E.S.I.S." and "The Deadlock Cipher".

== Plot ==
The story's prologue is set in Highgate Cemetery, where Professor Alexis Fairburn, an Eton beak (Professor), is tracing a tombstone when he is kidnapped by Wolfgang and Ludwig Smith. Fairburn manages to leave the piece of paper with which he was tracing. The story itself starts with young James Bond and his friend, Perry Mandeville (leader of the Danger Society), reminiscing the previous day's events.

Out of the blue, a letter to Pritpal from Fairburn comes, regarding Fairburn's resignation from Eton. To House Master Codrose and Headmaster Elliot, the "mistakes" are due to Fairburn's scatterbrained personality and eccentricity, but Pritpal soon realises that the mistakes were there for a reason. James and Pritpal work towards trying to decipher them - the first of them are easy - some wrong names in the letter (Luc Olivier and Speccy Stevens) translate into "Solve seven cryptic clues."

However, they have to get several photographs of the letter, which has been confiscated by Cecil Codrose, before they can continue. Eventually, they get it and continue. They determine from the second clue that they have to solve the puzzle of a certain crossword in the next The Times and eventually determine that "Gordian Knot" means that they must meet a man nicknamed "Gordius," who is coming to Pritpal's next Crossword Society meeting. James decides to come along to the meeting, but all the man does is play a game of Hearts, during which James wins five pounds. The man gives his name as Ivar Peterson, who is a professor at Cambridge University. However, James and Pritpal do not believe him. James arranges with Perry to go to Cambridge University during Perry's father's birthday leave.

Before James can go to London, there is a break in at the school. James is sure that the intruder was intending to take something related to Fairburn. James decides to leave for London with Perry at once and learns that one more clue, when solved, says that Fairburn has actually been kidnapped. As he and Perry drive to London, they spy an old Bentley that is for sale. Eventually, they arrive in London and James goes off to Cambridge University to find Peterson. However, when he goes into his office, he discovers that Peterson has been murdered with an Apache revolver bayonet. The killer is, in fact, still in the room, and James flees before he can be attacked.

James then reads a letter that he took from Peterson's desk and finds the name "John Charnage" in it. Before he can work out what it means, the killer James had seen (Ludwig) arrives with his accomplice (Wolfgang). James flees in his Bamford and Martin, but the men give chase and James ends up crashing in a river. He manages to escape the vehicle before it explodes and hides under a bridge.

James passes out from the cold and wakes up in a hospital. After managing to steal a suit and shoes, James returns to Perry's house. The two realise that "John Charnage" is actually Sir John Charnage, a local businessman whose father used to own a chemical factory. The two pay him a visit, but James is recognised as the boy that was seen leaving the scene of Professor Peterson's murder. Charnage locks them in a room, but when he leaves to call the police, James and Perry try and escape. They manage to get to Hackney, where the Eton Mission is and for which Pritpal and Tommy Chong are working.

The group solve the remainder of the puzzle and determine two things - they need to check Room 5 of the Royal College of Surgeons and then go to Highgate Cemetery. They go to the museum first and learn of Charles Babbage, who had tried to invent two machines for solving mathematical problems - essentially primitive computers. They determine that Charnage is trying to build one of these machines. They then head down to Highgate Cemetery. Wolfgang and Ludwig arrive at the graveyard, but James and Perry flee and split up. James hides in their car's trunk and is led straight to Fairburn's kidnapper - Charnage. When they arrive, James sets their car on fire and, in the confusion, enters the building.

James finds himself in an abandoned chemical factory and steals a bottle of potassium to use as a weapon before he is discovered and is forced to escape. He discovers that the factory has been changed into an illegal underground casino. James tries to find a way out, but an American man who has just lost a fortune in the casino forces him to win back the man's money in roulette, preventing him from escaping, although James wins and the man promises to give him a share of the winnings. James is caught and taken to Charnage, who decides that he needs to kill him. To do this, he forces him to drink a large amount of gin. Drunk and with a damaged liver, James is then dragged by Ludwig and Wolfgang to a barge to be thrown into the River Thames. In his drunken state, James works out the rest of the crossword and determines that the word "Bond" (in his name) must have the word "runner" and the letter "m" inserted into it, but cannot make sense of the results. He manages to escape by throwing the jar of potassium at the Smiths, blowing Wolfgang's hand off, and then throwing himself overboard.

After making it to land, James wanders through East London in his drunken state and passes out in an alley. He wakes up to find himself surrounded by a gang of girls, who prepare to beat him up. However, by coincidence, he is in the town of Red Kelly (the boy he met during the events of SilverFin). The leader of the gang is Red's younger sister, Kelly, who immediately takes a shine to James. James learns that Charnage's business had stopped several years before because the labourers were always dying, and determines that Charnage must have been doing a deal with the Russians to build the computer that he is trying to build, the N.E.M.E.S.I.S. machine, to avoid losing his fortune. Red inadvertently solves the last piece of the puzzle - one of the results James had got earlier, Brunnermond, was actually where a large explosion took place, near the Royal Docks. James realises that the machine is at the Royal Docks, in a boat called the Amoras.

Upon arrival at the docks, James and Kelly sneak up to the boat and locate Fairburn before escaping to a nearby passenger ship, where they decide to shelter for the night. Kelly, who has demonstrated an interest in James since learning his identity, insists on dancing with him in the ballroom. However, during the night, Charnage's butler Deighton and a Russian man enter the boat and search for them, but they are rescued by Kelly's gang. They return to the Amoras and destroy N.E.M.E.S.I.S., killing Wolfgang and Ludwig in the process, before searching for the Russian in charge, Colonel Irina "Babushka" Sedova. They track her down to an abandoned train tunnel, where Kelly kisses James before they search. They eventually find Babushka, but she prepares to kill James. James manages to kill her henchman, and discovers a gun in his own pocket. He aims at Babushka's head, but spares her and lets her go.

Sometime after his return to Eton, James discovers that the American has kept his end of the bargain and given James a large sum of money. James tells Perry Mandeville that he intends to buy the Bentley they saw earlier with the money he won at the casino.

== Production ==
- Charlie Higson's original working titles for Young Bond Book 3 were "Shoot the Moon," "The Big Smoke," and "Six Days in December.".
- 80,000 copies of the first edition were sent to stores wrapped in a special foil wrapper to preserve the secret of the title.
- Despite the jacket artwork being kept under official wraps until the book launch event on January 3, 2007, the skull & cross bones device was touted as a candidate cover back in August 2006.

== See also ==
- Outline of James Bond
