= Young Bond =

Series of novels by Charlie Higson

- Illustration of a young James Bond by Kev Walker
- SilverFin (2005); Blood Fever (2006); Double or Die (2007); Hurricane Gold (2007); By Royal Command (2008); Danger Society: The Young Bond Dossier (2009); Shoot to Kill (2014); Heads You Die (2016); Strike Lightning (2016); Red Nemesis (2017)
- Author: Charlie Higson (2005–2014); Steve Cole (2014–2017)
- Country: United Kingdom
- Language: English
- Genre: Spy fiction, thriller, mystery
- Publisher: Puffin Books (UK); Hyperion Books (US)
- Published: 3 March 2005 – 4 May 2017
- Media type: Print (hardback & paperback); Audiobook

Young Bond is a series of young adult spy novels featuring Ian Fleming's secret agent James Bond as a young teenage boy attending school at Eton College in the 1930s. The series, written by Charlie Higson, was originally planned to include only five novels; however, after the release of the fifth novel By Royal Command, Higson considered the possibility of a second series. In October 2013 it was confirmed that a second series of four novels was in development, with the first novel Shoot to Kill released in November 2014, but it was penned by Steve Cole while Higson continued work on his young adult zombie series, The Enemy.

Since the release of the first novel, SilverFin, in 2005, the series has become very successful and has led to further works including games, a graphic novel and a supplemental travel guide.

English-language versions of the books are published by Puffin Books in the United Kingdom and Hyperion Books For Children in the United States.

== Charlie Higson's books ==
According to Charlie Higson, Ian Fleming Publications initially planned for him to only write one novel and that every subsequent novel would be written by a rotating author. This plan fell apart and Higson took on the role of author for further books in the series. However, following Higson's five books, subsequent books have been written by Steve Cole.

=== Main series ===
- SilverFin (2005): In 1933, thirteen-year-old James Bond arrives at Eton College for boys for the first time to continue his schooling. There, he meets George Hellebore, an American bully and his arms dealing father, Lord Randolph Hellebore. While on Easter break, Bond's adventure continues in Ross and Cromarty and Inverness-shire. Teaming up with Red Kelly, James finally reaches a castle and a loch and discovers a deadly secret.
- Blood Fever (2006): In 1933, James Bond is back at Eton where he is now a member of a secret risk-taking club known as the Danger Society. When summer vacation arrives, Bond goes on a field trip to the Italian island of Sardinia where he stays with his much older cousin Victor Delacroix. While there, James investigates a Roman secret society known as the Millenaria that has planned throughout history to restore the Roman Empire. It seems the Millenaria are still active and are led by the sinister Count Ugo Carnifex.
- Double or Die (2007): The third Young Bond novel is set entirely in England during Christmas and finds James searching for a missing schoolmaster Alexis Fairburn in the darkest corners of London. The book involves Russian spies attempting to build an early computer. The title of the book was chosen by fans via an online poll and kept secret until the day of publication.
- Hurricane Gold (2007): The fourth Young Bond novel, Hurricane Gold, is set in Mexico and the Caribbean. The book was released on 6 September 2007 in the UK. The plot is centred on Bond trying to foil the robbery of a team of professional criminals, only to end up following them around Mexico and eventually to a mysterious Caribbean island called Lagrimas Negras. The book contains many references to Mayan mythology and much of the end is focused on it.
- By Royal Command (2008): The fifth Young Bond novel was released in the UK on 3 September 2008. In this book, James Bond falls in love with his Irish maid, Roan Power. Bond leaves Eton College due to the incident with Roan, as mentioned in Ian Fleming's novel You Only Live Twice. This book is set in multiple European countries including Austria, Britain, France, Germany and Switzerland. The Royal Family and the British secret service also play a part in the plot (revealing that Bond's tutor Michael Merriot is a British spy).

=== Supplementary books ===
- The Young Bond Rough Guide to London, Puffin Books/Rough Guides (2007)

64-page booklet featuring London locations from Double or Die.

- Danger Society: The Young Bond Dossier, Puffin Books (2009)

Complete and definitive guide to the world and adventures of Young Bond. It includes the Young Bond short story "A Hard Man to Kill" by Charlie Higson. Release date: 29 October 2009.

=== Short story ===
An original Young Bond short story by Charlie Higson titled "A Hard Man to Kill" was published in the companion book Danger Society: The Young Bond Dossier on 29 October 2009. The story is set between the books Hurricane Gold and By Royal Command and involves Young Bond travelling back to London aboard the French ocean liner SS Colombie. An extract from the story appeared in some later paperback editions of By Royal Command. It is the longest James Bond short story yet written.

== Steve Cole's books ==
On 9 October 2013 Ian Fleming Publications announced that a new series of four Young Bond books were in development, written by Astrosaurs creator, Steve Cole. Cole's novels follow on from Higson's last entry, By Royal Command and the aftermath of Bond's expulsion from Eton. The first novel was published in the UK by Random House in the autumn of 2014. A lifelong fan of the original Bond novels, Cole described the task as "a thrilling privilege and an exciting challenge".

In an interview with the Bucks Herald, Cole stated that Bond was 14–15 years old in his novels and that the books would show how the adult Bond was formed. As part of the process for securing the position, Cole was tasked with creating a pitch for a story arc that would stretch across all four books. In May 2014, it was announced that Cole's book, titled Shoot to Kill was to be released on 6 November 2014.

In October 2015 at the Cheltenham Literature Festival, Cole revealed the cover art for his second novel in the series, entitled Heads You Die, which was published by an imprint of Random House called Red Fox and the book was to be released on 5 May 2016.

In May 2016, Cole's third book in the series was revealed to be titled Strike Lightning, scheduled to come out sometime during the autumn later in the year.

In September 2016, the title of Cole's fourth and final Young Bond novel was revealed to be Red Nemesis.

=== Main series ===
- Shoot to Kill (2014): The sixth Young Bond novel explores the aftermath of Bond's expulsion from Eton, taking him to Hollywood, Los Angeles where he investigates the mystery behind some disturbing film footage discovered by a friend and a fellow adventurer named Daniel. It is the first book in the series not to be published by Puffin Books but instead by Random House in the UK, and was released on 6 November 2014.
- Heads You Die (2016): The seventh Young Bond novel sees Bond travelling to Cuba on holiday which turns into a nightmare mission to save Gerald Hardiman, an old friend from Scolopendra, a villain who has perfected 1,000 ways to kill. With corrupt police and hired assassins hot on his heels, Bond must travel through Havana and cross Caribbean waters to stop a countdown to mass murder.
- Strike Lightning (2016): Set at the end of 1934, while Bond is at Fettes College in Edinburgh, his father Andrew Bond's alma mater. When James stumbles upon a horrific sight, he knows things are not what they seem. His school is determined to make him believe what happened was an accident, but James believes what he saw was murder. The significance of the events at the school only come to light in the course of an adventure that takes James across Europe and puts him within range of Konstantin Grünner, a warmongering villain.
- Red Nemesis (2017): James is on home soil when he receives a package with a message from beyond the grave. The package's mysterious contents put James at the heart of a long-running plot that, if it runs its course, will paint London's streets red with blood. Not only will James have to fight to stay alive and save the country he loves, but to clear the Bond family name, which he holds so dear.

== History ==
=== Pre-release criticism ===
Prior to the release of SilverFin, the idea of a Young Bond series had not gone over too well with the fans of the more traditional Bond literature and had come under heavy fire, with some fans comparing it to an unsuccessful 1960s attempt by Bond's publishers to launch a youth-oriented line of fiction that resulted in only one book: The Adventures of James Bond Junior 003½ written by the pseudonymous R. D. Mascott. There was also a moderately successful James Bond Jr. television series in the early 1990s aimed at children that dealt with Bond's supposed nephew.

John Gardner, who had written fourteen original novels and two novelisations featuring the adult Bond, was also critical of the series prior to the release of the first book. He stated:

It's just the last desperate attempt to draw in a new audience. The films have little to do with the Bond we used to know, and now the books are going the same way.

Higson, for his part, has been on record as stating that he intends to stay true to the backstory Ian Fleming created for Bond, though this in many ways contradicts the popular James Bond: The Authorized Biography of 007 by John Pearson.

=== Post-release reaction ===
When SilverFin was published in March 2005, reviews of the novel were good. This, in addition to a large marketing campaign in the United Kingdom, elevated SilverFin to the number eight spot on the Booksellers list of best-selling children's books in the UK. By November 2005, SilverFin had already sold 500,000 copies worldwide.

A second book in the Young Bond series, Blood Fever, was released on 5 January 2006 in the UK having been delayed from an initial release in October 2005. The book reached the number one spot on the Booksellers list of best-selling children's books in the UK in its second week of release and held the spot for eleven weeks.

Double or Die, the third book in the series, was released in the UK on 4 January 2007, having had its title announced the day before. The title was voted on in a national poll on the official Young Bond website; the other two titles to choose from were N.E.M.E.S.I.S. and The Deadlock Cipher. After the first three days of Double or Die's release it took the number two spot on the Booksellers list of best-selling children's books in the UK and number fourteen in the overall UK Top 50 list. A week later it had climbed to number one on the children's list and the number twelve spot overall.

As of March 2009 the Young Bond novels have sold over 5 million copies and have been translated into 25 languages.

In December 2010 all five Young Bond books were released as eBooks by Ian Fleming Publications.

On 5 May 2011 Puffin Books released two special editions of SilverFin

The five book Young Bond series were re-released in the UK on 5 April 2012 with all new cover art by Hyperion Books.

== US publication ==
In June 2004 it was announced that the Young Bond series would be published by Miramax Books, then still a part of Disney. The acquisition was announced by Miramax co-chair Harvey Weinstein and Miramax Books president & editor in chief Jonathan Burnham. The deal's price tag was not disclosed, but was understood to be in the six-figure range. Miramax, in conjunction with Disney's Hyperion Books for Children label, published SilverFin in 2005 and Blood Fever in 2006. Following Miramax's split from Disney, Ian Fleming Publications struck a new deal for the remaining books with Hyperion Books for Children. This created a gap between publication of the books in the UK and US, with the third book, Double or Die not appearing in the US until April 2008. Book four, Hurricane Gold, was published by Disney-Hyperion in April 2009. Also in 2009, Disney-Hyperion re-released SilverFin and Blood Fever with new cover art by artist Kev Walker. By Royal Command and SilverFin: The Graphic Novel were released in the US on 18 May 2010.

== Other media ==
=== Games ===
With the release of the Hurricane Gold book, TAMBA and Fleming Media released the Avenue of Death game which is based on one of the chapters in the book.

On 11 August 2008 Puffin Books announced the first Young Bond alternate reality game (ARG), The Shadow War. The online game started on 23 August, when Charlie Higson set the first mission during his appearance at the Edinburgh International Book Festival. In the game, players around the world use a range of media, including the Young Bond books themselves and the World Wide Web, to complete the missions and influence the outcome of the game. Charlie Higson took part in a live online event that concluded the game on 8 October 2008.

=== Illustrations ===
On 23 April 2005, Ian Fleming Publications released the first illustration of the thirteen-year-old James Bond drawn by Kev Walker. Walker illustrations have also been used on the covers of the U.S. hardback editions of Blood Fever and Double or Die. Walker also illustrated the SilverFin graphic novel released in the UK on 2 October 2008.

=== Graphic novels ===
In 2008, SilverFin: The Graphic Novel, was released as a graphic novel on 2 October 2008 by Puffin Books. The book was written by Charlie Higson and illustrated by renowned comic book artist Kev Walker. It was released by Disney Publishing in the US as both a hardcover and paperback in 2010 and was awarded the 2011 Will Eisner Comic Industry Award for Best Adaptation from Another Medium the following year.

=== Movie ===
Due to the success of SilverFin and Blood Fever, Hollywood has been interested in adapting these novels to film; however, Ian Fleming Publications and Charlie Higson have said they hope to release a few more books before possibly considering it. Today, it is believed the film rights to James Bond on film reside exclusively with Danjaq, LLC, the parent company of Eon Productions, however, according to Charlie Higson this is not exactly the case.

=== Audio Series ===
In February 2026, Big Finish Productions announced a full-cast audio series based on the novels. After an open casting call, Isaac Rouse was cast as Bond with Charlotte McBurney as Wilder Lawless. The first story will be a two-part adaptation of SilverFin, for release in October 2026.

== See also ==
- James Bond Jr.
- Alex Rider
- Jimmy Coates
- CHERUB
- Henderson's Boys
- Cody Banks
- Spy School
- Outline of James Bond
