= Shoot to Kill (novel) =

2014 novel by Steve Cole

- First edition UK hardback
- Author: Steve Cole
- Language: English
- Series: Young Bond
- Genre: Spy novel
- Publisher: Random House
- Publication date: 6 November 2014
- Publication place: United Kingdom
- Media type: Print (Hardcover)
- Pages: 296 pp (first edition, hardcover)
- ISBN: 978-0-85753-373-9

Shoot to Kill is a novel written by Steve Cole, the first continuation entry in the Young Bond series. Cole took over from Charlie Higson, who left the series in 2009 after his final instalment A Hard Man to Kill. Shoot to Kill features Ian Fleming's spy James Bond in his teenage years, finding himself troubled in the outskirts of Los Angeles, having recently been expelled from Eton. It was followed by Heads You Die in May 2016.

== Plot ==
Before leaving, a new school friend discovers some shocking film footage which propels James Bond and company on an adventure.

== See also ==
- Outline of James Bond
