= The Adventures of James Bond Junior 003½ =

1967 James Bond spin-off novel

- 1967 first edition cover
- Author: R. D. Mascott
- Illustrator: Christopher Chamberlain
- Cover artist: Jane Hood
- Series: James Bond
- Genre: Spy novel
- Publisher: Jonathan Cape
- Publication date: 1967
- Publication place: United Kingdom
- Media type: Print (hardcover)
- Pages: 175
- OCLC: 461864

The Adventures of James Bond Junior 003½ is a 1967 James Bond spin-off novel carrying the Glidrose Productions copyright. It was first published in the United Kingdom by the Jonathan Cape publishing company in 1967 and later in 1968 in the United States by Random House. The American edition was retitled 003½: The Adventures of James Bond Junior. The novel was written under the pseudonym R. D. Mascott.

Although the novel is based around a character named James Bond Junior who is the nephew of James Bond, in Ian Fleming's own novels Bond is an only child and an orphan.

In 1966 Harry Saltzman announced a television series about a ten-year-old who fought SPECTRE that could have been based on 003½ but nothing became of it. At some other point Bond film producers Saltzman and Broccoli planned to make either a theatrical feature or a TV series based on the 003½ premise. The producers discussed story ideas with several unidentified screenwriters in London.

The Adventures of James Bond Junior 003½ is considered a failed attempt at launching a youth-oriented line of fiction aimed at 8- to 14-year-olds. A moderately successful television series of the same name was launched in 1991, produced by Eon Productions / Danjaq. The success of the show spawned numerous novelisations, a video game, and comic books. Unrelated to 003½, Ian Fleming Publications began publishing a successful youth-oriented line of Young Bond adventures featuring James Bond as a teenager in the 1930s beginning in 2005.

Although an officially licensed spin-off from the James Bond series, its place within the canon of the books—if any—has never been established.

== The author ==
It was not known who wrote The Adventures of James Bond Junior 003½, although many authors have been named as possibilities, including Roald Dahl and Kingsley Amis. Amis was usually seen as unlikely since a year later he released Colonel Sun under the pseudonym Robert Markham; however, unlike R. D. Mascott, Amis's authoring of Colonel Sun was never a secret. Amis's writing style was also not similar to Mascott. Roald Dahl, on the other hand, did share some similarities, specifically with one book he wrote in 1975, Danny, the Champion of the World. Dahl completed the screenplay for You Only Live Twice for Eon Productions in 1967, the same year The Adventures of James Bond Junior 003½ was published. Although there was evidence to suggest Dahl may have written 003½, there was equally as much evidence to suggest he had not.

Several authorities attributed the novel to Arthur Calder-Marshall. Calder-Marshall had written a number of books especially similar in style; his descriptions of characters and environments in his books The Magic of My Youth (1951) and The Scarlet Boy (1961) also resembled those in The Adventures of James Bond Junior 003½. It had also been suggested that the initials R. D. are a play on the name Arthur, which is sometimes shortened to Artie.

Several years ago, the now defunct 007Forever.com website made a detailed case for the claim that Arthur Calder-Marshall was indeed the author behind the R.D. Mascott pseudonym. This incredibly detailed analysis focused greatly on the writing style, and compared specific paragraphs from 003½: The Adventures of James Bond Junior to several of Calder-Marshall's novels which were published at roughly around the same time.

As reported at Her Majesty's Secret Servant, the identity of Mascott was kept a secret for decades until it was confirmed by his executors to be Arthur Calder-Marshall (19 August 1908 – 17 April 1992). Calder-Marshall's daughter later confirmed him as the author of the book.

== Plot summary ==
The plot follows James Bond Junior while he tries to uncover what is going on at Hazeley Hall. He and Sheelagh Smith, his "girlfriend," follow the clues of this mystery, but the information is given to the commander of the police, Sir Cuthbert Conningtower, when James is injured. Conningtower ultimately gets the credit for solving the case and threatens James if he says anything.

== Characters ==
James Bond (Junior): the son of David Bond and nephew of James Bond 007. Has his own gang of schoolmates, the "Pride of Lions". James' housemaster and Dr. Hartshorn dub him 003 1/2. Writes to his famous uncle who sends him a sheath knife.

Mrs. Raggles: James's caregiver while his parents are in Dar es Salaam. At the climax, she contacts Commander Sir Cuthbert Conningtower about what James discovers at Hazeley Hall.

Mrs. Frame: the former owner of Hazeley Hall. She had given James exclusive access to the bothy and James had stored his goods in there. She dies in her sleep at the start of story.

Mr. Merck: a German with a mammoth build, broad spatulate nose, curly hair, large lips, close-cropped ginger hair, curly ginger beard, and ginger hairs on the back of his fists. He peaks in a high squeaky voice and is the new owner of Hazeley Hall. He steals £2m gold bullion en route from the Soviet Union to Britain at Gatwick Airport.

Sheelagh Smith: a child slightly younger than James. She lives at Hazeley Hall with Merck and draws and sketches. Her mother Katherine Smith is in Holloway Prison doing a six-month stretch for shoplifting. James entices her with sketching materials to get inside Hazeley Hall Manor so that he can get his goods from the bothy.

Maureen Gubb (Auntie Mo): a red-headed slattern with a thin, beaky face and flabby neck. She is Merck's cook and housekeeper and Sheelagh Smith's caregiver.

Donal: Merck's henchman. He is tall, muscular, barrel chested and wears track suits. He is Auntie Mo's beau.

Paddie: Merck's henchman. He is bandy-legged and "a squirt".

Commander Sir Cuthbert Conningtower: An ex-naval intelligence author of Spies I've Espied. He drives an XK120 Jaguar. His complexion is the colour of a half-ripe blackberry. He drinks gin, wears dentures and is a philanderer. He steals credit for James's investigative work.

Audrey Wedderburn: an actress who plays "Chastity Carstairs" on ITV's Stormbusters. She dreeds Guard Dogs and sells them to Merck. She assists Commander Sir Cuthbert Conningtower. Sheelagh sketches her at Hazeley Hall. James assumes that there may be more between them then stopping crime. James sees her late one night with Conningtower in his Jaguar.

Lady Conningtower: Commander Sir Cuthbert Conningtower's wife. Once beautiful, now wrinkled, but still proud and noble, even when anxious.

"Pride of Lions": James's own gang. The Pride used to play in Hazeley Hall's ammunition dump. They resent Merck fencing-in Hazeley Hall so they retaliate with guerilla warfare: put silver sand in petrol tanks, puncture tires with one-inch carpet nails, put water in the oil tank, and attempt – but fail – to poison guard dogs. On James's advice, the Pride launch "Operation Barker": distract Merck's guard dogs all night so that James can sneak into Hazeley Hall. While there, James sees Merck in a police car and his men in military uniforms driving camouflaged Bedford trucks as they set out to steal the gold bullion.

Squirrel Joram: "Pride of Lions" member. He comes from a family of poachers and is the current King of the Pride after James went away for a year to prep school. Squirrel resents James returning and fears James will reclaim leadership of the Pride. James and Squirrel had been best of friends; they fall out over Sheelagh Smith. James realises that Squirrel poisoned Sheelagh's Alsatian puppy. Squirrel Joram tells James that Sheelagh is a "nit-ridden gyppo". He kicks James out of the "Pride of Lions".

Bill Asher: "Pride of Lions" member. A chemist's son.

Charlie North: "Pride of Lions" member.

Jon Ling: a Boy Scout, and James's replacement in the "Pride of Lions".

Bobbie Maws: "Pride of Lions" member.

Alfie Maws: Bobbie Maws' father. Publican ("Lion and Unicorn"). A gangly man with a raw face part-paralysed down one side. He suspects stolen gold bullion is at Hazeley Hall. The "Pride of Lions" hold their meetings in the "Lion and Unicorn".

Mrs. (Nance) Maws: Alfie Maws' wife. Bobbie Maws' mother and "Lion and Unicorn" cook. She won't let her husband Alfie contact police about his theory Merck has stolen gold bullion at Hazeley Hall. Police have been snooping around their pub and troubling them for serving drinks after hours.

Nobby Scales: a postman and jack of all trades who knows everybody's business. He uses a GPO van to kill one of Merck's Doberman Pinschers.

Captain David Bond: James Bond Junior's father. (James Bond 007's brother.) An airline pilot who inherited Monkshill estate (in Beacon Hill on the Kent-Sussex border) from his own father Andrew Bond three years prior. At the story's end, Hazeley Hall comes on the market again and Captain David Bond buys the stables, the walled garden and the bothy. Captain Bond shows a profit on the sale of Monkshill.

Mrs. Bond: James Bond Junior's mother. Her sister Penny is in the hospital so she and her husband David Bond fly to Dar es Salaam to look after Penny's kids.

Les Bottome: Daily Clarion crime reporter.

Canon Wycherly-Pidgeon: a vicar.

Mr. Hignett, B.Sc. Manchester: The headmaster of the Secondary Modern. He has a face like dough with currants for eyes. He aspirates and drops his aitches.

Sergeant Daintree: A constabulary. According to Alfie Maws, Daintree is a "six-foot-three strip of eighteen-carat ignorance." Merck complains that Hignett's students are suspected of vandalising Merck's land rovers.

Satan: Merck's Alsatian (male). Sheelagh is one of the dog's handlers. James befriends Satan with Sheelagh's help.

Cerberus: Merck's Alsatian (female). Sheelagh is one of the dog's handlers. James befriends Cerberus with Sheelagh's help.

Mr. Dash: Mrs. Frame's gardener.

Mr. Manvell (and daughter): a veterinary; owns a kennel on lot next to the Hazeley property. He drives a Land-Rover and nearly collides with Lady Conningtower driving her husband Cuthbert's Jaguar late one night.

Dr. Hartshorn: a physician who tends to injured James at book's end and diagnoses James with pleurisy, double pneumonia and a torn ligament.

Miss Hubbard: a local children's author. She claims she has fairies not only at the bottom of her garden but also at the top.

== Reception ==
Claire Tomalin in The Observer said, "the story is a small perfect triumph in the hands of a master. This is probably the best bet for Christmas if you want to hand out spinal rather than moral chills."

The Library Journal said, "This imported British spin-off from the adult series doesn't exude literary quality but is a notch above what might be expected. After a sluggish beginning in which Bond family relationships and the basis for the story's intrigue are explained, the adventures of the youthful 003 1/2 (James Bond's nephew) gain momentum as he ferrets out the mystery of a heavily guarded estate and runs up against gold robbers and guard dogs. The crooks are finally apprehended in a satisfying, albeit predictable manner. Flashes of irony and some humor enliven this otherwise ordinary adventure story."

Ursula Robertshaw writing for The Illustrated London News complained that the book is "Very definitely for boys. It's all very exciting, but racy and rather bloody, and so not to be given to the sons of very prim parents."

Children's fiction critic Margery Fisher was more critical: "003 1/2 seems to be satire on three levels. First, with its bullion robbers and the indomitable amateur boy who cracks the code, as it were, the book sends up the junior thriller; young Bond with his blacked and infra-red camera and judo principles ("Don't go against the enemy, go with him") is a remote cousin of Miss Blyton's water-pistol-carrying kids. Then (and I am less certain of the author's intention here) the fast-moving events and casual cruelty of the story may be a satire on the exploits of Jimmy's notorious uncle; if so, it is a satire many readers won't see or won't want to. Mascott has given us glimpses of the sordid and a nearer approach to danger (and one brilliant female character drawn in the round). But one swallow doesn't make a summer and all Sheelagh's gibes and kisses and dirty clothes don't make this a genuinely realistic book."

Punch critic Marjorie D. Lawrie praised Christopher Chamberlain's "satisfying illustrations", but otherwise had no opinion of the book.

== See also ==
- James Bond Jr.
- Young Bond
- Outline of James Bond
