= By Royal Command =

2008 novel by Charlie Higson

- Hardback cover
- Author: Charlie Higson
- Language: English
- Series: James Bond / Young Bond
- Genre: Spy fiction
- Publisher: Puffin Books
- Publication date: 3 September 2008
- Publication place: United Kingdom
- Media type: Print (Hardcover and Paperback)
- Pages: 354 pp (first edition)
- ISBN: 978-0-14-138451-1
- OCLC: 230989341
- Preceded by: Hurricane Gold
- Followed by: Danger Society: The Young Bond Dossier
- Website: http://www.youngbond.com/

By Royal Command is the fifth novel in the Young Bond series depicting Ian Fleming's superspy James Bond as a teenager in the 1930s. The novel, written by Charlie Higson, takes place in 1934 and sees James at the age of fourteen as a student at Eton College. Locations include The Alps (Kitzbühel), England, France, Lisbon, and Vienna.

By Royal Command was published in hardcover by Puffin Books in the UK on September 3, 2008. Cover art (featuring a black and red Union Jack) was not revealed until the day of publication. The paperback was released on May 28, 2009, and includes an extract from a new Young Bond short story by Charlie Higson, "A Hard Man to Kill".

By Royal Command was released by Disney-Hyperion in the U.S. on May 18, 2010. Cover artwork is by Owen Richardson.

== Synopsis ==
In Lisbon, OGPU Colonel Irina Sedova, also known as 'Babushka' (Russian for 'grandmother'), visits the leader of the Communist Cell in Portugal. However, she soon realizes that he isn't the cell leader. He vainly tries to kill her but Sedova's bulletproof vest protects her and she manages to kill the imposter. She then finds a sheet of paper with a name from the past on it: James Bond.

During this time, Bond is on his way for a school skiing trip in Austria when he runs afoul of a group of Hitler Youth members who call him a cheater for having won a game of poker. He beats them, gives them back their money, and tells them to play with good grace. Some time later, he arrives in Austria where he realizes that he is being followed. When he arrives at his hotel, he is still being followed. There, he meets with his friend Andrew Carlton and his teacher Mr. Merriot. During a skiing outing, Bond goes after one of his classmates who is drunk and they get caught in an avalanche. After saving himself and his classmate, Bond is hospitalised and hears a man crying out about his cousin named Jürgen who is going to be killed. He later finds out this man was the Graf Von Schlick.

A few days later, the boys return to Eton where Bond is introduced to the new head of his House's Library, Theo Bentinck, a cruel and sadistic individual who enjoys tormenting the younger boys, and who immediately decides to target James for his abuse, knowing that he is not afraid of standing up to older students. Bond also meets the new maid, Roan Power. He finds himself falling in love with her and starts to spend time with her, although doing so brings him unwanted attention from Theo Bentinck. She takes him to meet her friend, an Irishman named Dandy O'Keefe. During this meeting, Bond accidentally meets the Princesses, Elizabeth and Mary but doesn't recognize them. A few days later, he is invited to a party given by the Prince of Wales where he meets the mysterious Graf Otto von Schlick.

On the 4th of June, King George V comes to Eton and Bond spots Sedova among the crowd. Sometime later he is knocked unconscious andbound and gagged by Dandy, who is planning to assassinate the King by blowing up the church of Eton, while framing Bond for it as part of a plan to start a communist revolution. After preventing the attempt and escaping with a hidden knife, Bond goes after Dandy, who tries to kill him with his knife. Bond is saved by the man who followed him in Austria when he shoots Dandy, who takes him to Mr. Merriot. The teacher reveals that he works for MI6 and that they have been keeping an eye on him. He tells Bond that Dandy and Roan are working for a Communist cell and that they want to know all about the operation. They want Bond to get Roan to talk.

Back at Eton, Roan tells Bond that they are working for a Communist agent who they know as 'Amethyst', who works for the Communist cell based in Portugal. This operation is being run by a man known as 'Obsidian'. Bond informs her that Dandy was captured and, after she begs him not to give her away, they share a kiss. However, unable to betray Roan, Bond tells her the truth and they make plans to run away to Austria together. Before they leave, Bond is accosted by Theo Bentinck, who has been out drinking, and provokes him, before tidily beating him up, and sending him on his way. With the help of James's friend, Perry Mandeville, he and Roan are able to get enough money to leave the country. During their crossing the continent into Austria, they are pursued not only by MI6 but also by Sedova.

When they arrive in Austria, Roan betrays Bond to Obsidian who is none other than Dr. Perseus Friend, whom Bond thought he had killed in SilverFin. It is revealed that Friend had assumed the identity of the Graf since the surgery and had met Bond at the party, and the original Graf had been killed. Also, it is revealed that Friend and Amethyst, a Russian named Vladimir Wrangel, are not working for the Russians but for the Nazis. The plan was to trick Dandy and Roan into believing that the King's death would inspire the workers of Britain to revolt against the government, and then into killing King George V. The King's death would, thus, have placed Edward VIII on the throne. As he was more sympathetic towards Hitler, and the fact that Dandy and Roan would have claimed to be working for the Communists, the United Kingdom would have formed an alliance with Germany, isolating the French and giving Germany an ally in the ensuing war against Communist Russia. Dr. Friend mocks Roan's idealism by saying that the British were too conservative to rise up against their monarchy.

Bond and Roan are locked up and Friend plans to have Bond flayed alive as a revenge for having nearly killed him. However, they manage to escape and are pursued around the castle by Wrangel. As he is about to kill them, OGPU agents under the command of Colonel Sedova, who had followed the entire conspiracy since Lisbon, attacked the Germans. Roan kills Wrangel, saving Bond, and Sedova kills Friend. Sedova corners Bond and Roan just as Bond had cornered her in London. Deciding to show him the same mercy, she tells him that she is taking him back to Russia as leverage against the British, when MI6 arrive and rescue the two. Sedova tries to shoot Bond, who is saved by Roan. Bond shoots Sedova, although she disappears shortly afterwards. Before dying, Roan reveals that she had been married to Dandy, but that she loved Bond.

Subsequently, Merriot informs Bond that, although the King was very grateful that he had saved his life, he would be unable to remain at Eton, so Bond is sent instead to Fettes College.

== Background ==
In an interview, Higson stated that By Royal Command will deal with Bond being forced to leave Eton College due to an incident with a maid. The incident was previously mentioned from the point of view of M in Ian Fleming's You Only Live Twice.

It must be admitted that his career at Eton was brief and undistinguished and, after only two halves, as a result, it pains me to record, of some alleged trouble with one of the boys' maids, his aunt was requested to remove him. She managed to obtain his transfer to Fettes, his father's old school.

— Ian Fleming You Only Live Twice, Chapter 21: Obit:

According to Higson, M's comment about the incident was a deliberate attempt to cover up the truth. "Basically, it is decided that things need to be hushed"

The Royal Family and the British Secret Intelligence Service (MI6) also play a role in By Royal Command. Because of talks of communism, anarchism, and fascism, this book is meant for an older audience than the usual '11 and up' age group. Bond meets Princess Elizabeth and her uncle the Prince of Wales during the course of the book. Even though the book will be partially set in The Alps, it does not offer any revelations about Bond's parents' deaths in an Alpine climbing accident.

At the launch party for Hurricane Gold, Charlie hinted that Amy Goodenough (from Blood Fever) and the villain Babushka (from Double or Die) return in this Young Bond adventure. He also revealed that James Bond falls in love.

== Tie-in game ==
On 11 August 2008 Puffin Books announced the first Young Bond alternate reality game (ARG), The Shadow War, designed to tie-in with the release of By Royal Command. The online game started on 23 August, when Charlie Higson set the first mission during his appearance at the Edinburgh International Book Festival. In the game, players around the world use a range of media, including the Young Bond books themselves and the internet, to complete the missions and influence the outcome of the game. Higson took part in a live online event that concluded the game on 8 October 2008.

== See also ==
- Outline of James Bond
