= Blood Fever =

2006 novel by Charlie Higson

- Puffin Books 2006 British paperback edition.
- Author: Charlie Higson
- Language: English
- Series: James Bond / Young Bond
- Genre: Spy novel
- Publisher: Puffin Books
- Publication date: 5 January 2006
- Publication place: United Kingdom
- Media type: Print (Hardcover and Paperback)
- Pages: 384 pp (first edition, paperback)
- ISBN: 0-14-131860-0 (first edition, paperback)
- OCLC: 62132226
- Preceded by: SilverFin
- Followed by: Double or Die

Blood Fever is the second novel in the Young Bond series depicting Ian Fleming's superspy James Bond as a teenager in the 1930s. The novel, written by Charlie Higson, was released in the United Kingdom on 5 January 2006 by Puffin Books.

== Plot summary ==
Blood Fever begins with a prologue during which a young girl named Amy Goodenough is aboard her father's yacht in the middle of the Mediterranean sea when it is boarded by a band of pirates under the command of Zoltan the Magyar. Zoltan's men ransack the vessel and murder Amy's father, who was unwilling to part with his priceless possessions. When Amy fails to get revenge by throwing a knife at Zoltan and hitting him in the shoulder, she is taken prisoner but swears she will one day succeed in achieving vengeance.

Following the events of SilverFin, James Bond is back at Eton where he is now a member of a secret risk-taking club known as the Danger Society. As summer holidays approach, James is given the opportunity to go to Sardinia on a field trip with one of his professors, Peter Haight and a colleague, Cooper-ffrench. While in Sardinia Bond plans to visit his cousin Victor Delacroix (a relation of Monique Delacroix, James deceased mother).

Prior to leaving, Bond learns of the tragedy that took place on the Goodenoughs' yacht from Amy's brother Mark, who attends Eton and is a friend of Bond's. Bond also witnesses a mysterious group whose followers are marked on both of their hands with an "M" (double M), which James eventually learns is the mark of the Millenaria, a defunct secret Italian society that has had plans throughout history to restore the Roman Empire.

Once arriving in Sardinia, James and his classmates begin a tour of the country to learn its history, during which Bond is poisoned (though the reader is not aware of it at the time) and almost killed. Bond departs from his classmates to spend time with Victor, Victor's artist friend Poliponi, and his teenage servant Mauro. Victor also hosts Count Ugo Carnifex, who is later identified as the leader of the reorganized Millenaria. Carnifex achieves the funding for such a task, as well as for his palace located high in the mountains of Sardinia, and his lavish lifestyle, by hiring pirates such as Zoltan the Magyar to plunder valuable items; however, Carnifex is a fraud who cannot actually afford to compensate his "employees". Additionally, when Zoltan arrives at Carnifex's palace, Carnifex declares ownership over Amy Goodenough, much to the great annoyance of Zoltan, whom during his travels to Sardinia had formed a unique and strange bond with Amy.

Later Bond is once again reunited with his classmates who are now in a town near Carnifex's palace. One night, Bond sneaks into the palace and finds Amy's cell, but is unable to rescue her and instead informs Haight. However, Haight reveals himself to be a loyal servant of Carnifex and that he had earlier attempted to poison James for asking too many questions about the Millenaria. Carnifex subsequently tortures James by tying him up in a swamp and allowing him to be bitten by mosquitoes, reasoning that one of them will be a carrier of malaria. Bond is rescued by Mauro's sister, Vendetta, who helps him rescue Amy.

Losing patience, Zoltan turns against Carnifex by flooding his palace. Carnifex is killed when the waters sweep his sea plane into him. After the destruction of the palace, Bond and Amy return to Victor Delacroix's villa, but are ambushed by Haight. Bond and Amy are saved by Zoltan, who gives his life for their protection in the process. Amy and Bond arrive at Victor's villa, where Carnifex's sister Jana is waiting for them. Bond tricks her by jumping into the sea, while Victor distracts her. Jana slips and falls into a bed of sea urchins, where she finally dies from the pain and poison. As Bond and Amy wade to the surface, Amy suddenly steps on a sea urchin. Bond knows exactly how to remove it.

== Awards and nominations ==
- Blood Fever won a Blue Peter Book Award in 2006.

== See also ==
- Outline of James Bond
