= Suite 16 (film) =

1994 thriller film directed by Dominique Deruddere

- Directed by: Dominique Deruddere
- Written by: Charlie Higson; Lise Mayer
- Starring: Pete Postlethwaite; Antonie Kamerling; Géraldine Pailhas
- Music by: Walter Hus
- Release date: 1994
- Running time: 106 min
- Countries: United Kingdom, Netherlands, Belgium
- Language: English

Suite 16 is a 1994 Dutch-Belgian-British thriller film directed by Dominique Deruddere and starring Pete Postlethwaite, Antonie Kamerling, and Géraldine Pailhas.

== Plot ==
The film takes place in an expensive hotel at the Côte d'Azur, where Chris, a young gigolo gets into a fight with one of his female customers and seemingly accidentally kills her. He runs off and hides in room 16, a penthouse where the rich but physically disabled man Glover lives. Glover offers him refuge from the police, alcohol, drugs and as many prostitutes as he wishes.

Chris then discovers that Glover records everything on video. He explains that he is so old and disabled that he can no longer have sex on his own, but still likes to watch others do it. He offers Chris money to fulfil his sexual fantasies for him, so he can watch. Slowly but surely the fantasies get more perverted and sadomasochistic, until Glover asks Chris to murder a woman during sex. Together they search for the best potential female victim.

== Cast ==
- Pete Postlethwaite - Glover
- Antonie Kamerling - Chris
- Géraldine Pailhas - Helen
