= Astrosaurs =

Series of children's science fiction novels by Steve Cole

Astrosaurs is a series of children's science fiction novels written by Steve Cole, which have been released since 2005. The main characters are space-going dinosaurs named Teggs Stegosaur (a Stegosaurus), Gipsy Saurine (a Hadrosaur), Arx Orano (a Triceratops) and Iggy Tooth (an Iguanodon). The series are published by Random House. The first two Astrosaurs books were released on 1 February 2005, with over twenty books following. The Teeth of the T. Rex was a special edition book written especially for World Book Day. Free trading cards come with each Astrosaur book, featuring foes, weapons, crew members, ships, aliens and many other characters and things found in the relevant book, with a set of 'bonus cards' available to order from the Steve Cole website, which are now believed to have gone out of print, and featured characters from the first eight books. The World Book Day title The Teeth of the T. Rex does not include cards, and is much shorter than the other books. The first five Astrosaurs books have now been released in Audiobook format on CD in the UK. The series is a huge hit with children nationwide. Beginning in late 2010, the books have been re-released with new cover artwork. Currently, books 12–15 are the only ones not to have been given the new covers. Woody Fox is the illustrator on every Astrosaurs book, who also draws the illustrations for the trading cards, with Charlie Fawkes having designed the Astrosaurs logo, consisting of the word 'ASTROSAURS' with the four main characters above it.

== Synopsis ==
The broad plot synopsis of the Astrosaurs series is that the dinosaurs were not in fact wiped out when a large meteor hit the earth millions of years ago; they had in fact discovered space travel during the Triassic period and had already left earth by the time the meteor struck. The dinosaurs subsequently settled in a part of space called the Jurassic Quadrant, which is divided between the carnivores and herbivores; between the two sectors is a neutral area of space. The two factions broadly stay at peace by avoiding each other, but invariably trouble flares up between the two from time to time. Admiral Rosso, a 'crusty old Barosaurus', employs Teggs to work for the DSS (Dinosaur Space Service) in the first book and introduces him to his crew, which includes Arx Orano, Iggy Tooth and Gipsy Saurine, along with fifty Dimorphodon. In Earth Attack, which is notable for being an extra-long edition, General Loki the Velociraptor goes back in time to try and prevent the dinosaurs leaving Earth, so the whole history of Astrosaurs would never have happened. However, he is stopped.

== Characters ==
Name	Description
Captain Teggs Horatio Stegosaur	Captain Teggs Horatio Stegosaur, a Stegosaurus from the planet Steggos, is an elite Astrosaur in the Dinosaur Space Service (DSS) and the captain of the DSS Sauropod. Headstrong and brave, Captain Teggs' love of adventure is matched only by his love of food. Teggs battle armour includes a special electric shock in the spike in his tail, which can be used to stun his enemies in a fight. He was made captain by Admiral Rosso.
Arx Longhorn Orano	Arx Longhorn Orano, a Triceratops from the planet Tri Major, is the first officer on the DSS Sauropod. He is the oldest member of the crew, at 52, and by far the brainiest. When the crew run into a sticky situation, Arx is usually the crew member who figures out the solution to the problem. Even so, he can run into dangers like cutting his leg on a megalodon tooth in The Terror-Bird Trap. Arx became a baby in The Twist of Time, but the effect was reversed by cold time-water.
Iggadoo Tooth ("Iggy")	Iggadoo Tooth (or "Iggy"), an Iguanodon from the planet Iguanos, is the chief engineer on the DSS Sauropod. As well as being a brilliant mechanic, Iggy has thumb spikes and stun claws on his battle armour making him a doughty fighter. He is the second-oldest, of 26. Also a good friend of Arx. His favourite weapons are his trusty stun claws. His brother Wimvis is also a mechanic.
Gipsy Saurine	Gipsy Saurine, a Corythosaurus from the planet Corythos, is the communications officer on board the DSS Sauropod. She is the only female member of the crew, and at 21 is also the youngest (excluding Sprite). She speaks almost every dinosaur language, which is immeasurably helpful on the crew's missions. On more than one occasion, she and Teggs have shown affection toward each other.
Sprrti-aaaat**o ("Sprite")	Sprite is a Dimorphodon from the planet Dimorphia. He is the leader of the dimorphodon flight crew. Up until The Skies of Fear, Sprite is a peripheral figure, rarely referred to in the background. Afterwards he plays an increasing role in the books, and in The Star Pirates he accompanies the primary crew on a mission and is actually referred as being an Astrosaur himself. Sprite is 16. In earlier books only Gipsy could communicate with him, but in The Star Pirates he has a conversation with Teggs where Teggs speak in whistles and Sprite speaks in cheeps and whistles that Teggs can understand.
The Dimorphodon	Fifty Dimorphodon, flying reptiles from the Jurassic period, pilot the DSS Sauropod. Sprite is their leader.
Others	Terri Alarmosaurus, the alarm pterosaur, is a warning bell in effect, who warns the crew of danger. Alass Tikka is the leader of several Ankylosaurus who form the security element of the crew.

== Books in the series ==
Title	Published
Riddle of the Raptors	1 February 2005
The Hatching Horror	1 February 2005
The Seas of Doom	5 May 2005
The Mind-Swap Menace	4 August 2005
The Skies of Fear	5 January 2006
The Space Ghosts	2 March 2006
The Day of the Dino Droids	1 June 2006
The Terror Bird Trap	3 August 2006
Teeth of the T-Rex	1 March 2007
The Planet of Peril	5 April 2007
The Star Pirates	7 June 2007
The Claws of Christmas	4 October 2007
The Sun Snatchers	7 February 2008
Revenge of the FANG	7 August 2008
The Carnivore Curse	1 January 2009
The Dreams of Dread	7 May 2009
The Robot Raiders	4 February 2010
The Twist of Time	29 April 2010
The Sabre-Tooth Secret	3 February 2011
The Forest of Evil	4 August 2011
Earth Attack!	6 October 2011
The T.rex Invasion	26 April 2012
The Castle of Frankensaur	30 August 2012
The Dinosaur Moo-tants	Autumn 2013, featuring the Cows in Action

== Astrosaurs Academy ==
A spin-off series of Astrosaurs started on 1 May 2008. This series focuses on Teggs Stegosaur in Astrosaurs Academy, it is based before Teggs becomes an Astrosaur. In Astrosaurs Academy, Teggs has two best friends, Blink and Dutch. Gipsy, Arx and Iggy do not appear in this series. The series ended with Space Kidnap on 3 March 2011.

Destination: Danger: Published – 1 May 2008
Contest Carnage: Published – 1 May 2008
Terror Underground: Published – 4 September 2008
Jungle Horror: Published – 5 February 2009
Deadly Drama: Published – 2 July 2009
Christmas Crisis: Published – 1 October 2009
Volcano Invaders: Published – 1 April 2010
Space Kidnap: Published – 3 March 2011

== Reception ==
Amanda Craig, writing in the Times, described it as "the kind of inspired, hysterically silly fantasy that boys adore".
