= Hurricane Gold =

2007 novel by Charlie Higson

- First edition UK hardcover
- Author: Charlie Higson
- Language: English
- Series: James Bond / Young Bond
- Genre: Spy novel
- Publisher: Puffin Books
- Publication date: 6 September 2007
- Publication place: United Kingdom
- Media type: Print (Hardcover and Paperback)
- Pages: 372 pp
- ISBN: 978-0-14-138391-0 (first edition hardback)
- OCLC: 137312909
- Preceded by: Double or Die
- Followed by: By Royal Command

Hurricane Gold is the fourth novel in the Young Bond series depicting Ian Fleming's superspy James Bond as a teenager in the 1930s. The novel is set in Mexico and the Caribbean. It was first published in the UK in September 2007.

== Plot introduction ==
Two American children are abducted by criminals searching for military plans stolen by their father. James Bond attempts to protect them by masquerading as a young Mexican thief and joining the gang. They journey through a Mexico and eventually arrive at the Caribbean island Lagrimas Negras. They will be kept there for the rest of their lives unless they complete 'La Avenida de Muerte'.

== Title ==
Hurricane gold, according to the character El Huracán, is a legendary Mayan treasure which is cursed and will bring inevitable ruin on its possessor. The US Navy documents are the "hurricane gold" in this story, since everyone who possesses it is destroyed by the people who seek to possess it.

== Plot summary ==
The book starts with a prologue on Lagrimas Negras (black tears), an island haven for criminals in the Caribbean. The boss, El Huracán, informs his lunch guests that one of them has broken the rule against contacting the outside world. Robert King is tricked into confessing, then made to run La Avenida de Muerte (The Avenue of Death), a deadly obstacle course. He is killed by a jaguar less than halfway through.

Following the events in Double or Die, James Bond travels to Mexico with his Aunt Charmian, who is visiting the ruined Mayan city of Palenque. In the fishing village of Tres Hermanas, Angel Corona, a young Mexican pickpocket who closely resembles James, steals Charmian's bag. James chases and corners him. Corona is subdued and soon arrested by the local police. While Jack Stone, an American flying ace and friend of Charmian's flies Charmian to Palenque (as a storm is on the way and she has to leave that night). James is left in Tres Hermanas with Stone's children, where he quickly finds problems: Stone's daughter, Precious, is a spoiled, self-centered girl about the same age as James, while her younger brother, Jack Junior or JJ, is immature and annoying.

During a devastating hurricane, some gangsters led by a Mrs. Theda Glass enter the Stone house and steal the safe. James knocks one of the gunmen, Manny, out of the window, the youngsters hid from the gangsters and the storm in an underground ice house. After the storm, James takes the Stone children to town in Jack Stone's Duesenberg, which is wrecked by a sudden flood. JJ is nearly killed but is rescued by Garcia, James's sailor friend. When JJ and Precious are captured by the remaining four robbers, James passes himself off as Angel Corona to join the gang and Garcia tags along. The names of the other criminals are Strabo, 'Whatzat' (real name Charlie Moore) and Sakata. The Japanese gangster Sakata befriends James and teaches him jiu-jitsu.

Mrs. Glass takes the group to an old oil field in order to get tools and explosives to open the safe. She tells Precious the full story: Jack Stone had lost money after the end of the war and had become a smuggler to regain money; one of his clients was an ex-U.S Navy officer who had stolen some important documents about the U.S. Navy's Pacific fleet, which Stone managed to steal after abandoning the officer. Sakata had been sent to steal the plans, which would be very valuable to the Japanese in the event of a war. However, the documents are not in the safe, so presumably Stone had not removed them from his plane. Whatzat attacks James and drowns to death, and Garcia attempts to take JJ to Veracruz for treatment but is killed by Strabo. James learns from Mrs. Glass that Whatzat name was Charlie Moore. When JJ's injured leg becomes severely infected, Sakata, prompted by James, leaves the gang and takes JJ to the hospital in Vera Cruz.

Mrs. Glass and Strabo make a new plan to flee to Lagrimas Negras and sell the documents to the ruler of the island, El Huracán. James and Precious escape and camp out for a while. Precious has undergone a change in character; she is no longer rude and self-centered, and even develops affections for James, which she expresses by waiting for him to fall asleep and then kissing him. Then Manny shows up in a car. He is very sick, as he has had brain damage following his fall at the Stone Mansion. He slips in and out of confusion. Finally, James and Precious knock him out of the car as he sleeps and escape. They head for Pelanque, but are unable to stop Mrs Glass escaping with the documents, though Strabo is killed by army ants. The Pelanque Ruins are mentioned in the chapter titled "Pelanque" where James and Precious fall asleep in the tall tower.

Mrs. Glass goes to Lagrimas Negras alone. James and Precious follow on a ship. Manny follows them and gives chase. He is killed by El Huracán's guards and James and Precious are employed as servants on Lagrimas Negras. James discovers that when the guests of Lagrimas Negras run out of money, they are forced to work as slaves on El Huracán's farm. James also hears that running La Avenida de Muerte is the only way to get off Lagrimas Negras, though no one has ever survived it. Precious steals a map of the obstacle course from a bathroom she is cleaning and she and James start training. They trick El Huracán into letting them run the course which he does reluctantly, as he was hoping James would stay on as his successor.

James and Precious successfully traverse many obstacles, helped by their advance knowledge. Finally they reach a massive water tank containing a vicious crocodile that will almost certainly kill them, as there is no way out. However, James has left some explosives in the maintenance tunnel and blows out the wall. He is knocked unconscious by the landing. He wakes up on a rock with Precious, who passionately kisses him while they wait to be collected. El Huracán keeps his promise to release them and the book ends with James and Precious leaving Lagrimas Negras with Jack Stone. They share a private moment watching the sunset, during which Precious admits to James that she loves him (despite her understanding that he must return to Britain after the events of the story).

== La Avenida de Muerte ==
The obstacles of the Rat Run that James and Precious compete in are as follows:

1. A small pool of savage baby crocodiles that will bite at the ankles of anyone who swims in their pool. This is conquered because James and Precious douse themselves with animal repellent before entering the pool.
2. A long path with holes along with it through which sharp spikes shoot through. James and Precious conquer this by forming a human arch along the walls that allow them to walk across them out of reach of the spikes.
3. A tunnel of scorpions that must be accessed from the previous obstacle. James and Precious can climb over the top of this tunnel from their human arch and so don't even get a scratch from them.
4. A giant anaconda in a pit that will constrict the victims who have no choice but to jump into the pit and land on top of it. James and Precious conquer this by simply jumping over the pit from the top of the scorpion tunnel.
5. A path of metal plates that are being heated below by El Huracán's men, making them hot enough to fry almost anything. At the end is a small trench full of water containing leeches so that the victim doesn't stay in the water long. James and Precious get around this by cutting inserts of thin metal sheets into the soles of their shoes so that they insulate their feet and prevent the soles of their feet from burning.
6. A path with a series of transparent, razor-sharp wires across it. There is also a black jaguar at the entrance that will attack anyone who doesn't traverse the path quick enough. James and Precious have no means of conquering this other than the practice on the beach beforehand.
7. A path containing a series of millstones, two spinning clockwise and the middle one spinning anti-clockwise, with three enormous grindstones to the left-hand side of them that could crush the victim if they got too close. This is one of the few tasks that James and Precious could neither prepare nor practice for, having to rely on speed and balance.
8. An enormous tank full of honey that is harder to swim through than water and is easier to drown in. James and Precious manage to beat this challenge by stripping down to their underwear so that no loose clothing can weigh them down.
9. A log covered with army ants suspended over a large pit of wooden stakes that will impale the victim if he/she falls, or chooses to kill themselves. James and Precious find this challenge the hardest of the lot, as they have to crawl along with the log and put up with the biting ants as they try to eat the honey they are coated in from the previous challenge while trying not to fall off.
10. The final challenge, known as One Death (Hun Came). A giant bull crocodile is kept in an enclosed chamber with no exit, which is the reason why nobody has ever escaped the Rat Run. James and Precious manage to escape the chamber by rigging up the door with dynamite the day before and detonating it from within the chamber, thus completing the Rat Run.

== Writing the book ==
Prior to the release of SilverFin Charlie Higson said that Book 4 would be set in the Alps, however, the location was changed to Mexico and the Caribbean. Higson considered setting the book in North Africa, but decided against it because Ian Fleming never liked the idea of Bond going to North Africa. Unlike the other Young Bond novels, there are no scenes set at Eton College.

When asked whether he would continue the pattern of following Fleming's templates by echoing some elements of the fourth 007 novel Diamonds Are Forever, Higson said "there are some similarities, it is set in the Americas, there are gangsters in it but there is no cowboy train!"

Higson completed work on the book in December 2006, a month before Double or Die was released.

Charlie Higson's working title was Lágrimas Negras, but because the publishers had the idea of publishing it as an all-gold book, they asked Higson to try to come up with a title that included the word "gold".

Also changed was the name of the character Precious Stone. She was originally named Amaryllis Stone after the half-sister of Ian Fleming (who is also referenced in the short story The Living Daylights). But because the character starts out the novel as so unpleasant, it was feared it might offend the Fleming family and the name was changed.

== Publication history ==
The novel was published as a hardcover, a first for the series, in the UK on 6 September 2007 by Puffin Books. Puffin released an audiobook read by author Charlie Higson on 27 September. A paperback edition was released on 28 May 2008, the Centenary of Ian Fleming's birth.

Hurricane Gold had previously been announced as a 2008 release before the publishing date was pushed up to 2007. With Double or Die also being published in 2007, this creates a unique situation – the first time more than one James Bond novel was published in the same calendar year, (not counting film novelizations, spinoff novels such as The Moneypenny Diaries or short stories).

On 10 August 2007, Charlie Higson signed and numbered 1500 copies of Hurricane Gold to be distributed to independent bookstores only. Number "007" was discovered in a small bookshop in Lytham St Annes in Lancashire and sold on eBay for £156.50 ($319.82).

A launch party for the novel was held at Waterstone's Piccadilly in London on 6 September 2007 with an all-gold theme.

Hurricane Gold entered the charts at #2, selling 6056 copies in just half a week's sales.

== See also ==
- Outline of James Bond
