= Heads You Die =

2016 novel by Steve Cole

- First edition hardback cover
- Author: Steve Cole
- Language: English
- Series: Young Bond
- Genre: Spy novel
- Publisher: Red Fox
- Publication date: 5 May 2016
- Publication place: United Kingdom
- Media type: Print (Hardcover)

Heads You Die is a novel written by Steve Cole, which is the second book by the author in the Young Bond series, and the seventh chronological novel overall. The book was published by Red Fox, an imprint of Random House, on 5 May 2016.

== Plot ==
James's Cuban holiday has become a nightmare mission to save an old friend from a villain who has perfected 1,000 ways to kill. With corrupt cops and hired assassins hot on his heels, James must travel through Havana and brave Caribbean waters to stop a countdown to mass murder. Fates will be decided with the flip of a coin. Heads or tails. Live or die.

== See also ==
- Outline of James Bond
