= Charlie Higson =

British actor, comedian and author

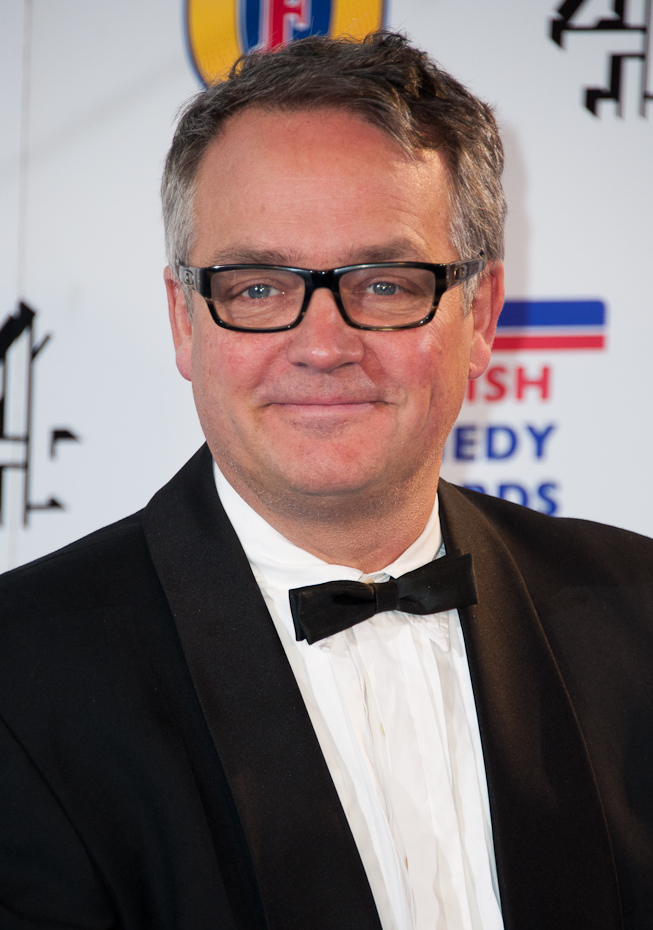
- Higson at the 2013 British Comedy Awards
- Born: Charles Murray Higson; 3 July 1958 (age 68); Frome, Somerset, England
- Occupations: Actor; comedian; author
- Years active: 1980–present
- Spouse: Victoria L Fullick (m. 1995)
- Children: 3

Charles Murray Higson (born 3 July 1958) is an English actor, comedian, author and former singer. He has also written and produced for television and is the author of the young adult post-apocalyptic book series The Enemy, as well as the first five novels in the Young Bond series.

== Early life ==
Born in Frome, Somerset, Higson was educated at Sevenoaks School, Kent and at the University of East Anglia (UEA) in Norwich (where his brother Andrew taught from 1986 to 2008, latterly as Professor of Film Studies). At UEA, Higson met Paul Whitehouse, David Cummings and Terry Edwards. Higson, Cummings and Edwards formed the band The Higsons, of which Higson was the lead singer from 1980 to 1986. They released two singles on the Specials' 2 Tone Records label. This was after he had formed the punk band The Right Hand Lovers, wherein he performed as "Switch". Higson then started squatting in London and became a decorator, coincidentally decorating the house of Stephen Fry and Hugh Laurie.

== Career ==
Higson started writing for Harry Enfield with Paul Whitehouse and performing comedy. He came to public attention as one of the main writers and performers of the BBC Two sketch show The Fast Show (1994–2000). He also worked with Whitehouse on the radio comedy Down the Line. In 1994 Higson co-wrote the screenplay for the thriller film Suite 16 with Lise Mayer.

He worked as producer, writer, director and occasional guest star on Randall & Hopkirk from 2000 to 2001. Subsequent television work has included writing and starring in BBC Three's Fast Show spin-off sitcom Swiss Toni. He first appeared as a panellist on QI in 2007. In 2010 he co-directed and starred in the series Bellamy's People.

In 2013 Higson adapted Agatha Christie's A Caribbean Mystery for ITV's Agatha Christie's Marple series. In 2015 Higson reimagined the novel Strange Case of Dr Jekyll and Mr Hyde by Robert Louis Stevenson for ITV Studios into a ten part adventure series, set in the 1930s titled Jekyll and Hyde. In 2017, Higson appeared as Ian Winterman in series three of Broadchurch and as Ronnie Maguire in series three of Grantchester.

2020 saw Higson compete on Richard Osman's House of Games. alongside Chizzy Akudolu, Kate Williams and Tom Allen.

Higson has also starred in Lobby Land, a radio sitcom on BBC Radio 4, as Tom Shriver MP.

=== Books ===
Time Out has described Higson as "The missing link between Dick Emery and Bret Easton Ellis".

Higson wrote a series of five Young Bond novels, aimed at younger readers and concentrating on James Bond's school-days at Eton starting with SilverFin, released in 2005, and ending with By Royal Command (2008). Higson had been at school with Jonathan Evans, former Director General of MI5.

Higson wrote a post-apocalyptic, zombie-horror series of books for young adults. The first book in the series, titled The Enemy, was released in 2009. At a school event at Abingdon School on 14 September 2011, Charlie told children: "Originally it was going to be three books and then my publisher, Puffin, said make it five, and now we're up to it being seven." The seventh novel, The End, was published in 2015.

In 2018 Higson wrote a Fighting Fantasy gamebook titled The Gates of Death, which was published by Scholastic books as part of their campaign to relaunch the Fighting Fantasy franchise. He is a long term FF enthusiast, having attended Fighting Fantasy Fest 2 in London the previous year and also made a cameo appearance in the Ian Livingstone gamebook Blood of the Zombies.

In May 2023 Higson released his first adult Bond novel, On His Majesty's Secret Service, to mark the Coronation of King Charles III and support the National Literacy Trust.

== Personal life ==
Higson lives in London with his wife and three sons.

== Filmography ==
=== Film ===
Year	Film	Role	Notes
1994	Suite 16		Co-writer
1996	Shooting Stars: Unviewed and Nude	Alan Ball / Hans Solo	Uncredited
1998	The Land Girls	Subaltern	Uncredited
1998	The Fast Show Live	Various characters	
1999	The Comedy Trail: A Shaggy Dog Story	Bob Fleming	TV special
2003	King of the Ants		writer
2013	Appearance	Charlie Higson	Short film
2014	The Red Line	Barman	Short film
2017	The Ministry of Stories Anthology of Horror	Hydra	

=== Television ===
Year	Title	Role	Notes
1990	The Craig Ferguson Show	Various characters	Television film, also writer
1990–1991	Vic Reeves Big Night Out	Various characters	9 episodes
1990–1992	Harry Enfield's Television Programme	Various characters	4 episodes, also writer
1993–1995	The Smell of Reeves and Mortimer	Robert De Niro; Swiss Toni; Various characters	10 episodes
1994–2014	The Fast Show	Swiss Toni; Various characters	25 episodes, also writer
1997	It's Ulrika!	Various characters	Television film
1998	Ted & Ralph	Ralph Mayhew; Aunt Cecilia; Ralph's Father	Television film
1999	Bang, Bang, It's Reeves and Mortimer	Various characters	6 episodes
1999	You Ain't Seen All These, Right?	Various characters	Television film
2000–2001	Randall & Hopkirk (Deceased)	Various characters	12 episodes, also writer
2001	Fun at the Funeral Parlour	Nutkins	1.04 "The Mountains of Doom"
2001	Happiness	Bryan the Counsellor	1.04 "Desperate Dan"
2003	The Fast Show Farewell Tour	Various characters	Television film, also writer
2003–2004	Swiss Toni	Swiss Toni	16 episodes, also writer
2004	Catterick	Pat	Television miniseries
2006	Dick & Dom in da Bungalow	Himself	Celebrity 'Bungalow Head'
2010	Bellamy's People	Various characters	1.01 "Episode One"
2010–2012	Ruddy Hell! It's Harry and Paul	Bunny	5 episodes
2011	The Fast Show Faster	Swiss Toni / Various characters	3 episodes
2013	Marple	James Bond	6.01 "A Caribbean Mystery", also writer
2014	The Incredible Adventures of Professor Branestawm	The Mayor	Television film, also writer
2015	Professor Branestawm Returns	Mayor	Television film, also writer
2015	Jekyll and Hyde		10 episodes. Creator, showrunner
2017	Broadchurch	Ian Winterman	7 episodes
2017	Grantchester	Ronnie Maguire	2 episodes
2023	Mog's Christmas	Jolly Uncle (voice)	Animated television film

== Bibliography ==
=== Novels ===
- King of the Ants (1992) ISBN 0-349-11103-0
- Happy Now (1993) ISBN 978-0-241-13363-7
- Full Whack (1995), ISBN 0-241-00287-7
- Getting Rid of Mister Kitchen (1996) ISBN 0-316-88106-6
- Monstroso (2010) ISBN 978-0-14-132845-4
- Whatever Gets You Through the Night (2022) ISBN 978-1-4087-1428-7

=== The Enemy ===
==== The Enemy novels ====
1. The Enemy (2009) ISBN 0-14-138464-6
2. The Dead (2010) ISBN 978-0-14-138465-8
3. The Fear (2011) ISBN 0-14-138466-2
4. The Sacrifice (2012) ISBN 978-0-14-133612-1
5. The Fallen (2013) ISBN 978-0-14-133614-5
6. The Hunted (2014) ISBN 9780141336107
7. The End (2015) ASIN B00Z8PHRKS

==== The Enemy short story ====
- Geeks vs. Zombies (2012) ISBN 9780141344249 (This companion book in the series, released by Disney Hyperion, portrays an exclusive scene from The Fear, on World Book Day.)

=== Young Bond ===
1. SilverFin (2005), ISBN 0-14-131859-7
2. Blood Fever (2006), ISBN 0-14-131860-0
3. Double or Die (2007), ISBN 0-14-132203-9
4. Hurricane Gold (2007), ISBN 0-14-138391-7
5. By Royal Command (2008), ISBN 0-14-138451-4
6. SilverFin: The Graphic Novel (2008), ISBN 978-0-14-132253-7 (with Kev Walker)
7. Danger Society: The Young Bond Dossier (2009), ISBN 978-0-14-132768-6 (authored short story included in book)

=== Fighting Fantasy ===
- The Gates of Death (2018)

=== James Bond ===
- On His Majesty's Secret Service (2023), ISBN 978-1-915-79707-0
- King Zero (2026), ISBN 978-0-241-79971-0

=== Non-fiction ===
- The 'Fast Show' Book (1996), ISBN 0-7522-2267-8 (with Paul Whitehouse)

=== Short stories ===
- "The Red Line" in The 'Time Out' Book of Short Stories, edited by Maria Lexton (1993), ISBN 0-14-023085-8
- "The Beast of Babylon" in Doctor Who: 11 Doctors, 11 Stories: 11 Doctors, 11 Stories, with Neil Gaiman, Richelle Mead, Eoin Colfer, Marcus Sedgwick, Michael Scott, Philip Reeve, Patrick Ness, Malorie Blackman, Alex Scarrow, Derek Landy (2013), ISBN 978-0-14-134894-0
