= SilverFin =

Novel by Charlie Higson

- Puffin Books 2005 British paperback edition
- Author: Charlie Higson
- Language: English
- Series: Young Bond
- Genre: Spy novel
- Publisher: Puffin Books
- Publication date: 5 March 2005
- Publication place: United Kingdom
- Media type: Print (hardcover and paperback)
- Pages: 372 pp (first edition, paperback)
- ISBN: 0-14-131859-7 (first edition, paperback)
- OCLC: 59011406
- Followed by: Blood Fever

SilverFin is a 2005 spy novel written by Charlie Higson, and published by Puffin Books. The story focuses on the life of Ian Fleming's superspy James Bond as a teenager in the 1930s, in which he begins his school life at Eton College, before uncovering an unethical plan to create supersoldiers whilst spending his Easter holidays in Scotland.

Several editions for the international market were created, including in Canada and the United States. Higson's work spawned a special edition, alongside a graphic novel, while forming the basis for the Young Bond series.

== Plot ==
13 year-old James Bond starts attending Eton College, a prestigious English boarding school, where he makes friends with Indian student Pritpal, the son of a Maharajah, and Chinese student Tommy Chong. A few days after the new school year begins, Eton hosts a sporting tournament consisting of three events, all arranged by American businessman Lord Randolph Hellebore, whose son George attends the school but is perceived by other students as a bully. During the final event of the tournament, James spots George taking a shortcut, and decides to use it himself in order to win the race. This causes George to come third overall in the competition behind a rival student, much to the disgust of his father.

When the Easter holidays arrive, James travels to Scotland to meet with his aunt Charmian, along with his ailing uncle Max, who is dying from cancer. He spends time talking with them, including discussing the death of his parents and his uncle's life as a spy during the Great War, along with learning how to drive Max's car. Whilst travelling the country, Bond befriends an Irish boy from London named "Red" Kelly, who is searching for his cousin Alfie, after he disappeared when he went out to fish at Loch Silverfin, and Wilder Lawless, a young girl at a local stables. James learns Hellebore owns a large stretch of land in Scotland that includes Loch Silverfin, and so teams up with Red to investigate Hellebore's castle estate. Arriving on the estate grounds, the pair discover the remains of a Pinkerton detective, who had been killed by eels living in Loch Silverfin. Through his possessions, they learn that the detective was sent from New York City by Hellebore's distant wife to investigate her husband, on suspicion Hellebore killed his brother Algar, who happened to be her lover.

After Red injures himself, James breaks into the castle on his own, but knocks himself out whilst snooping around. When he regains consciousness, he finds himself interrogated by Hellebore, who reveals that Algar is alive and that the two brothers have been working on a supersoldier drug known as "Silverfin serum", designed to act as a steroid that affects the endocrine system. Algar tested the first batch of the serum on himself, but later dosages of it mutated him physically. Hellebore later perfected the serum, though dumped the waste of the manufacturing process into Loch Silverfin, mentally altering its eel population into vicious creatures. James learns Alfie was rescued by Algar when he was nearly attacked by the eels, only to be brought to Hellebore who used him test out the serum, dying from heart failure when his body couldn't handle the dosage.

James is drugged with the serum by Hellebore and locked up, but escapes thanks to his enhanced abilities through an underwater entrance from the castle to Loch Silverfin. Aided by Wilder who witnesses his escape, the pair kiss, before she reveals that George is with her. James learns he is there in hopes of destroying his father's work, having despised his dreadful behaviour towards him. James joins with him to destroy the laboratory, only to be confronted by Hellebore. Before he can kill them with a double-barreled shotgun, Algar intervenes and forces both of them into Loch Silverfin. Hellebore shoots him, wounding Algar, whereupon his brother's blood attracts the eels who kill them. In the aftermath of his actions, James collapses due to a lung infection and exhaustion. Several days later, after recovering, he learns that George has moved back to America to be with his mother. He also learns Max has died, but is surprised to learn his uncle bequeathed him with his car.

== Development ==
=== Connections to Bond canon ===
- SilverFin begins with a similar opening to Ian Fleming's Casino Royale.
  - Fleming: "The scent and smoke and sweat of a casino are nauseating at three in the morning."
  - Higson: "The smell and noise and confusion of a hallway full of schoolboys can be quite awful at twenty past seven in the morning."
- Bond's Aunt Charmian drives an identical Bentley to one Bond drives in Casino Royale and in subsequent books. Bond also inherits his uncle's 1.5 liter Bamford & Martin Sidevalve Short Chassis Tourer. Bamford & Martin later became Aston Martin.
- During a scene at a circus the announcer presents "The Mighty Donovan". "The Mighty O'Donovan" is Donovan "Red" Grant's father, referenced in From Russia, with Love.
- Lord Hellebore tells his son while they are hunting that they are a lot like Indians, and, when his son kills a deer, he says he is a true Indian. This is a reference to Ian Fleming's World War II days, where his soldiers were nicknamed 'Fleming's Indians'. References to American Indians also appear in the novel Casino Royale, where Le Chiffre calls Bond a boy playing Indians, and on the last page, where Bond scolds himself for carelessly playing Indians while his enemies had been working right next to him.

=== Title ===
- Higson's original working title was Out of Breath, but it was felt this sounded too much like an Elmore Leonard novel. Several permutations on "Silver" were tried, including "SilverBack", "SilverSkin", "SilverHead", and "SilverFist", before settling on "SilverFin".
- A hellebore is a poisonous plant often thought to resemble a rose, making a suitable name for the handsome but evil Lord Hellebore.

=== International editions ===
- When released in Germany in August 2005, SilverFin was retitled Silent Waters Are Deadly.
- The U.S. edition of the book was edited to remove descriptions that were considered too racy for young readers. One such example includes a description of Wilder Lawless's legs during a tussle between herself and Bond.

== Publication history ==
- 3 March 2005, Puffin Books, paperback, first British edition
- 3 March 2005, Puffin Books, abridged audiobook, first British edition
  - Narrated by Charlie Higson.
- 2 April 2005, Miramax Books, hardcover, first American edition
- 6 October 2005, Puffin Books, hardcover, first British edition
  - Limited edition. 1000 copies numbered and signed by Charlie Higson.
- 1 April 2006, Miramax Books, paperback, first American edition
- 11 April 2006, Listening Library, unabridged audiobook, first American edition
  - Narrated by Nathaniel Parker

=== 2011 special editions ===
On 5 May 2011, Puffin Books released two special editions of SilverFin. First was a numbered, limited edition hardcover with a new introduction by Charlie Higson. It had a glow in the dark cover and came in an engraved Perspex slipcase. All copies were signed by Charlie Higson, and it was limited to 1,000 copies worldwide. Puffin also released a new special edition paperback with "all new material" and a redesigned cover.

== In other media ==
=== Graphic novel ===
A graphic novel adaptation of SilverFin written by Charlie Higson and illustrated by artist Kev Walker was released by Puffin Books in the UK on 2 October 2008 and by Disney Hyperion in the U.S. on 18 May 2010.

== See also ==
- Outline of James Bond
