= Colonel Sun =

Novel by Kingsley Amis

- First edition cover
- Author: Kingsley Amis writing as Robert Markham
- Cover artist: Tom Adams
- Language: English
- Series: James Bond
- Genre: Spy fiction
- Publisher: Jonathan Cape
- Publication date: 28 March 1968
- Publication place: United Kingdom
- Media type: Print (hardback & paperback)
- Pages: 255 pp (first edition, hardback)
- OCLC: 562319365

Colonel Sun is a novel by Kingsley Amis published by Jonathan Cape on 28 March 1968 under the pseudonym "Robert Markham". It is the first James Bond continuation novel published after Ian Fleming died in 1964. The novel centres on the fictional British Secret Service operative James Bond and his mission to track down the kidnappers of M, his superior at the Secret Service. During the mission he discovers a communist Chinese plot to cause an international incident that would implicate Britain. Bond, assisted by Ariadne Alexandrou, a Greek spy working for the Russians, finds M on a small Aegean island, rescues him and kills the two main plotters: Colonel Sun Liang-tan and a former Nazi commander, Von Richter.

To create a realistic setting and characters Amis drew upon a holiday he had taken in the Greek Islands. He emphasised political intrigue in the plot more than Fleming had done in the canonical Bond novels, also adding revenge to Bond's motivations by including M's kidnapping. Despite keeping a format and structure similar to Fleming's Bond novels, Colonel Sun had a mixed reception, many reviewers commenting that Amis lacked Fleming's style in writing.

Colonel Sun was serialised in the Daily Express in March 1968 and adapted as a comic strip in the same newspaper between 1969 and 1970. Elements from the story have been used in the Eon Productions Bond series: the 1999 film The World Is Not Enough used M's kidnapping; the name of the antagonist in the 2002 film Die Another Day, Colonel Tan-Sun Moon, comes from Colonel Sun Liang-tan; and one scene inspired an element of the 2015 film Spectre.

== Plot ==
Kidnappers violently take the Secret Service chief M from his house and almost capture James Bond, who is visiting his superior. Intent on rescuing him, Bond follows the clues to Vrakonisi, one of the Aegean Islands. In the process, he discovers the complex military-political plans of Colonel Sun of the Chinese People's Liberation Army. Sun has been sent to sabotage a Middle East détente conference which the Soviet Union is hosting. He intends to attack the conference venue and use M and Bond's bodies to blame Britain for the disaster, leading to a world war. Bond meets Soviet agents in Athens, led by Major Piotr Gordienko, and they realise that not only is a third country behind the kidnap, but that there is a traitor in Gordienko's organisation. An attack on the Soviet headquarters kills all the agents except Ariadne Alexandrou, a Greek Communist. As Gordienko is dying he encourages Bond and Ariadne to work together to prevent an international incident.

Ariadne persuades Niko Litsas, a former Second World War resistance fighter and friend of her late father, to help them by telling him about the involvement in the plot of a former Nazi war criminal, Von Richter. Trying to find M and Colonel Sun, Bond is nearly captured by the Russians, but is saved by Litsas. Finally, Bond finds Sun's headquarters, where he is knocked out by one of Sun's men; Bond learns that Von Richter will use a mortar to destroy the conference venue and that Bond will be tortured by Sun, before his inevitable demise. Sun tortures him brutally, until one of the girls at the house is ordered by Sun to caress Bond. In the process she cuts one of Bond's hands free and provides him with a knife. She tells Sun that Bond is dead: when examined Bond stabs Sun. He then frees other captives who help Bond stop Von Richter. Sun, however, survives the stab wound and kills several of the other escapees; Bond tracks down Sun and kills him. The Soviets thank Bond for saving their conference, offering him the Order of the Red Banner, which he politely declines.

== Background and writing history ==
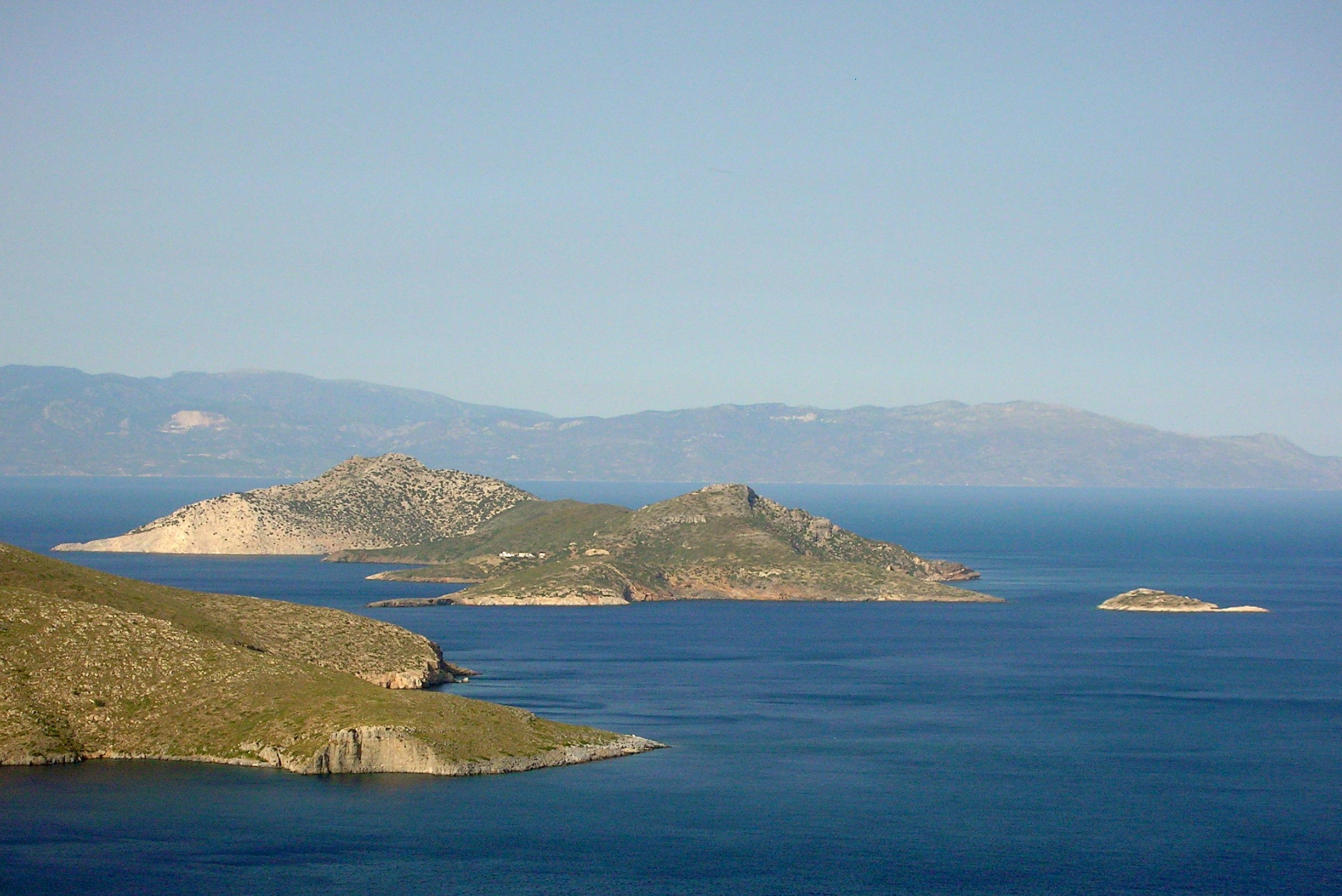
Amis drew upon a holiday in the Aegean islands to create a realistic Greek setting.

Ian Fleming, the creator of James Bond, died on 12 August 1964, eight months before the publication of his twelfth and final novel, The Man with the Golden Gun. (Note: The books were Casino Royale (1953), Live and Let Die (1954), Moonraker (1955), Diamonds Are Forever (1956), From Russia, with Love (1957), Dr. No (1958), Goldfinger (1959), Thunderball (1961), The Spy Who Loved Me (1962), On Her Majesty's Secret Service (1963) and You Only Live Twice (1964); the short story collection For Your Eyes Only was published in 1960.) After his death the Fleming-family-owned Glidrose Productions (now Ian Fleming Publications) held the rights to his works and decided to publish the short story collection Octopussy and The Living Daylights on 23 June 1966.

Glidrose took legal advice and found the Bond character could not be copyrighted. They decided that to avoid the possibility of other people publishing works about Bond, they would commission a sequel to retain their rights in the Bond product. (Note: In 1966 the Bulgarian writer Andrei Gulyashki wrote the novel Avakoum Zahov versus 07, which involved a clash between Bond and Gulyashki's character, the detective Avakoum Zakhov. Glidrose took action and made him change the name of the British spy and stopped him using the number 007, which Gulyashki changed to 07.) Initially Glidrose approached the author James Leasor to write a continuation novel, but he declined. They then commissioned the writer Kingsley Amis. Fleming's widow, Ann, did not endorse any further Bond works, which she saw as cashing in on his work. She disliked Amis and said:

Since the exploiters hope Colonel Sun will be the first of a new and successful series, they may find themselves exploited. Amis will slip 'Lucky Jim' into Bond's clothing, we shall have a petit bourgeois red brick Bond, he will resent the authority of M, then the discipline of the Secret Service, and end as Philby Bond selling his country to Spectre.

The Sunday Telegraph asked her to review the novel, but her resulting criticism was so acerbic that it was never published as it was thought it could have been libelous.

Amis was known by Glidrose to be an aficionado of Fleming's novels. In 1964 Fleming's publishers, Jonathan Cape, were concerned enough about the manuscript of The Man with the Golden Gun to ask Amis to read it and give his thoughts on whether it was viable for publishing. He was paid £35 15 shillings for his thoughts and advice, although his subsequent suggestions for alterations to the plot were not used. (Note: £35 15s in 1964 is approximately equivalent to £630 in 2025, according to calculations based on the Consumer Price Index measure of inflation.) Cape had taken the step because they thought the novel was not up to Fleming's usual standard. In 1965 Amis wrote The James Bond Dossier—a critical analysis of the Bond books under his own name—and The Book of Bond, a tongue-in-cheek manual for prospective agents, published using the pseudonym Lt.-Col. William ("Bill") Tanner. The novelist Sally Beauman observed that it was "unusual, not to say unprecedented, for an established author to pick up the torch" in the way Amis did with the Bond novels, although she thought that "Bond [is] too big, and too profitable, a property to be placed in the hands of an unknown".

When deciding where to set the novel, Amis considered several locations, but was persuaded on Greece after he was invited to join friends who summered there every year. He later explained his thought process:

Greece? Yes—Bond never been, I never been, sounds good, islands just right. Also, Eastern Mediterranean a sphere of Russian expansion, British interests there too. (This was September 1965.) But Russia versus Britain too old-hat. Then Red China versus Britain and also versus Russia. So Bond could team up with Russian agent. Female. Tough, like all Bond's girls. And Red China as villain is both new to Bond and obvious in the right kind of way. And Chinese master-villain would be fun ...

In May 1967 Amis wrote to his friend, the poet Philip Larkin, and mentioned that he had finished writing the novel.

Glidrose decided to publish Amis's novel under the pseudonym Robert Markham. Fleming's brother, the writer Peter Fleming, suggested the name "George Glidrose", but this was rejected and Markham chosen instead. The initial thought was that the Markham name would be used for all future Bond novels, regardless of who the author was, but Colonel Sun was the only one published under the name.

Colonel Sun is set a year or so after the events depicted in The Man with the Golden Gun. Although Fleming did not date the events within his novels, John Griswold and Henry Chancellor—both of whom wrote books for Ian Fleming Publications—have identified an in-universe timeline: Chancellor put the events of The Man with the Golden Gun in 1963; Griswold is more precise and considers the story to have taken place between November 1963 and the end of February 1964. (Note: Griswold and Chancellor identified their separate timelines based on episodes and situations within the novel series as a whole.)

== Development ==
=== Inspirations ===
Amis and his wife Jane spent September 1965 holidaying on the Greek island of Spetses; he used the experience to provide the background to Colonel Sun. He followed a tradition set by Fleming of using the names of people he knew or had met during his researches for the book and he drew on the names of people he met in Greece for the novel. The boat Bond uses—The Altair—was the name of the boat Amis and his wife used on holiday; Ariadne's fictitious colleagues, "Legakis" and "Papadogonas", were friends who helped Amis in Greece; and the doctor who treats Bond in chapter two was named after Amis and Jane's own doctor.

=== Characters ===
Raymond Benson—the author of continuation Bond novels from 1997 to 2002—considers Amis's version of Bond to be close to that developed by Fleming. Benson describes this personality as a natural continuation of the Bond developed in the final three Fleming novels. In all three novels, the events take a toll on Bond: he loses his wife in On Her Majesty's Secret Service; he loses his memory in Japan in You Only Live Twice; and he is brainwashed in Russia, is de-programmed by MI6 and almost dies from Francisco Scaramanga's poisoned bullet in The Man with the Golden Gun. Benson also sees a humourless side to Amis's version of the character, one which Fleming used in his earlier novels.

The main villain of the novel is Colonel Sun Liang-tan (Chinese: 孙良坦; pinyin: Sūn Liángtǎn). Sun is a member of the Special Activities Committee of the Chinese People's Liberation Army as well as a sadist and skilled torturer. Benson calls him "very worthy of inclusion in the Bond saga". Sun desires power over an individual and the ability to hurt them solely to cause pain. After Bond has been captured, Sun explains to him his approach to torture:

You must understand that I'm not the slightest bit interested in studying resistance to pain or any such pseudo-scientific claptrap. I just want to torture people. But—this is the point—not for any selfish reason, unless you call a saint or a martyr selfish. As de Sade explains in The Philosopher in the Boudoir, through cruelty one rises to heights of superhuman awareness, of sensitivity to new modes of being, that can't be attained by any other method.

The cultural historian Jeremy Black sees similarities between Sun and Fleming's Chinese villain Julius No from the 1958 novel Dr. No. In both books the characters are shown as having a disregard for human life. The reviewer John Dugdale, in a 2018 retrospective review, called Sun "the most repellent racial caricature of all, a descendant of Fu Manchu and other fiendish orientals".

The role of M in the novel changed from the one the character had played in Fleming's works. Instead of being the figure who instructs Bond on his mission, he becomes the cause of the mission. The cultural historians Janet Woollacott and Tony Bennett consider that as M does not give Bond's mission its necessary ideological perspective, Bond's "duel with Colonel Sun becomes little more than a personalised feud". Amis did not like the character of M and, as one reviewer pointed out, had "spent a chapter running him down" in The James Bond Dossier. Benson considered that M's character evokes an emotional response from the reader because of the change from his usual, business-like manner to a semi-catatonic state after being kidnapped and drugged.

=== Themes ===
Benson observes an increased level of political intrigue in Colonel Sun compared to the earlier Bond novels. Bond acts in concert with the Russians against the Chinese, which Benson sees as demonstrating the theme of peacekeeping between nations. Black considers the novel reflects the realities of the late-1960s as China had developed hydrogen bomb capability in 1967 and the Sino-Soviet split had been taking place across the 1960s culminated in 1969 with the Sino-Soviet border conflict. Reflecting this, the novel shows a shift in the balance of world power away from two-party Cold War politics.

Black observes an emotional and social sadness throughout Colonel Sun. The social sadness is a reaction to the culture of modernity and mourning what was being lost in its place. In England Amis describes "the ugly rash of modern housing – half-heartedly mock-Tudor villas, bungalows and two-storey boxes with a senseless variegation of planking, brick and crazy paving on the front of each and the inevitable TV aerial sprouting from every roof"; in Greece he writes:

In thirty years, he reflected, perhaps sooner, there would be one vast undifferentiated culture, one complex of super-highways, hot-dog stands and neon, interrupted only by the Atlantic, stretching from Los Angeles to Jerusalem; possibly, by then, as far as Calcutta, three-quarters of the way round the world. Where there had been Americans and British and French and Italians and Greeks and the rest, there would be only citizens of the West, uniformly affluent, uniformly ridden by guilt and neurosis, uniformly alcoholic and suicidal, uniformly everything.

This treatment by Amis is similar to Fleming's nostalgia in describing Paris in "From a View to a Kill". Benson identifies Bond's desire for revenge as a central theme of the novel. The plot centres on Bond's need to avenge the death of the Hammonds and M's kidnapping. Benson describes this as particularly striking: "Bond is particularly brutal in achieving his goal ... The revenge is very satisfying. This is Bond at his toughest."

== Publication and reception ==
=== Publication history ===
Jonathan Cape published Colonel Sun on 28 March 1968; the book was 255 pages long and priced at a guinea. (Note: A guinea was originally a gold coin the value of which was fixed at twenty-one shillings (£1.05). By this date the coin was obsolete and the term simply functioned as a label for that sum. According to calculations based on the Consumer Price Index measure of inflation, one guinea in 1968 is approximately £20 in 2025.) It was listed as the second best seller in the "Books in demand" list of the Financial Times for March and April 1968. The novel sold well and the journalist and author Eric Hiscock states that by 1980 it had sold over 500,000 copies worldwide. The paperback version was also popular and was reprinted ten times in three years. Harper & Row published Colonel Sun in the US on 1 May 1968; it ran to 244 pages. In June 1969 the book was listed seventh in The Washington Post's paperback best seller list.

=== Reception ===
Colonel Sun received mixed reviews from the critics; Benson considers this is because of the different styles between Amis and Fleming. Many of the critics reviewed the novel not just on its own merits, but also in comparison to Fleming's works. (Note: These included Roger Baker in The Times, Alexander Muir in The Daily Mirror, Malcolm Bradbury in The Guardian, Maurice Richardson in The Observer and S. K. Oberbeck in The Chicago Tribune.) Roger Baker, writing in The Times, considers that although Colonel Sun was a good thriller, it was different, given it was a recreation of Bond, and one written by Amis. Baker sees the novel does not include "the patina of sophisticated hedonism that made Bond the great pop-hero" and that the writing lacks Fleming's "off-beat kinkiness". Baker thought that with Amis writing the story, "one might, justifiably, have expected a joyous rejuvenation or at least a devastating detour from the Fleming pattern. We get neither. It is a pale copy." Writing in The Guardian, Malcolm Bradbury thought the book readable, but that it was not representative of either Fleming or Amis and Maurice Richardson, reviewing for The Observer, found what he described as Fleming's "spontaneous élan" to be missing from the novel. He continued that Amis tried to keep the novel credible, but "missed ... [Fleming's] particular ambience, especially that infectious, cocky sense of well-being".

S. K. Oberbeck, writing in The Chicago Tribune, sees the character of Bond changed under Amis, humanising him into "a sensitive man-of-ethics"; this adversely affected the formula Fleming used when writing. Donald Stanley, writing in Life magazine, was unconvinced by the changes to Bond, observing that his "essential swinishness is being replaced by some kind of dilute humanism". Writing in The Times Literary Supplement, the playwright Simon Gray, unimpressed with the novel, called the Bond in Colonel Sun "a chuckle-headed imposter whose arthritic thought processes would be a liability in a 'physical tussle' down at the pub". Sally Beauman, writing for New York, complains that Bond is far too gloomy and is more like one of Ingmar Bergman's characters than Fleming's.

Several reviewers liked Amis's interpretation of Fleming's universe. (Note: These included D. J. Enright, writing in The Listener, Alexander Muir in The Daily Mirror and Donald Stanley in Life.) D. J. Enright, writing in The Listener, considered that, in literary terms, Fleming's "inheritance has been well and aptly bestowed", calling it "Good dirty fun, once read and soon forgotten". The Daily Mirror's reviewer, Alexander Muir, considered the book to be "an exciting, violent, sadistic and sexy piece of reading matter". Stanley praised Amis for emulating "the celebrated Fleming Effect". The reviewer for the Los Angeles Times, Charles Champlin, stated that he enjoyed the novel, saying that it left "intact the reputations of both Messrs. Amis and Fleming", although he thought that it "lacks the garish, outrageous, ridiculous, symbol-witted touch of the original article".

Bradbury thought Colonel Sun "lacks a convincing rhetoric ... and the traditional Fleming frissons emerge only in muted form", and Oberbeck felt that Amis "never quite captures the bizarre beat of a Fleming pace". Richardson wrote that when being judged as a thriller, the novel "is vigorous, quite exciting, rather disorderly, a bit laboured". Beauman believed that Amis had ensured all the usual elements of Fleming's novels were there—an exotic location, lots of gunplay, a beautiful female character and a strong villain—yet, she wrote, "the book drags and becomes a bore". She attributes the novel's failure to the "differing characters of the authors".

== Adaptations ==
Colonel Sun was serialised on a daily basis in the Daily Express from 18 March 1968 to 30 March 1968. The novel was also adapted as a comic strip by the Daily Express. It was written by Jim Lawrence, drawn by Yaroslav Horak and published from 1 December 1969 to 20 August 1970; it was subsequently syndicated worldwide. In December 2005 Titan Books reprinted Colonel Sun and included River of Death, another original James Bond comic strip story published before the Colonel Sun strip in 1969. Titan reissued the strip in The James Bond Omnibus Vol. 003, published in 2012.

Elements of Colonel Sun have been used in the series of Bond films by Eon Productions: the kidnapping of M was used as a plot device in the 1999 film The World Is Not Enough; for the 2002 film Die Another Day, Eon wanted to use the name Colonel Sun Liang-tan for the main villain, but when the Fleming estate insisted on royalties for its use, Eon changed the name to Colonel Tan-Sun Moon; and a scene in Colonel Sun also inspired an element of the 2015 film Spectre.

== See also ==
- Outline of James Bond

== Notes and references ==
=== Sources ===
==== Books ====
- Amis, Kingsley (1971). What Became of Jane Austen? And Other Questions. New York: Harcourt Brace Jovanovich. ISBN 978-0-1519-5860-3.
- Amis, Kingsley (2000). Leader, Zachery (ed.). The Letters of Kingsley Amis. London: HarperCollins. ISBN 978-0-0063-8783-1.
- Bennett, Tony; Woollacott, Janet (2009). "The Moments of Bond". In Lindner, Christoph (ed.). The James Bond Phenomenon: A Critical Reader. Manchester: Manchester University Press. ISBN 978-0-7190-6541-5.
- Benson, Raymond (1988). The James Bond Bedside Companion. London: Boxtree. ISBN 978-1-85283-233-9.
- Besly, Edward (1997). Loose Change: A Guide to Common Coins and Medals. Cardiff: National Museum Wales. ISBN 978-0-7200-0444-1.
- Black, Jeremy (2005). The Politics of James Bond: from Fleming's Novel to the Big Screen. Lincoln, Nebraska: University of Nebraska Press. ISBN 978-0-8032-6240-9.
- Britton, Wesley Alan (2005). Beyond Bond: Spies in Fiction and Film. Westport, Connecticut: Greenwood Publishing Group. ISBN 978-0-275-98556-1.
- Chancellor, Henry (2005). James Bond: The Man and His World. London: John Murray. ISBN 978-0-7195-6815-2.
- Chapman, James (2007). Licence to Thrill: A Cultural History of the James Bond Films. New York: I.B. Tauris. ISBN 978-1-8451-1515-9.
- Fleming, Ian; Gammidge, Henry; McLusky, John (1988). Octopussy. London: Titan Books. ISBN 978-1-85286-040-0.
- Griswold, John (2006). Ian Fleming's James Bond: Annotations and Chronologies for Ian Fleming's Bond Stories. Bloomington, Indiana: AuthorHouse. ISBN 978-1-4259-3100-1.
- Laskowski, William E. (1998). Kingsley Amis. New York: Twayne Publishers. ISBN 978-0-8057-1663-4.
- Lawrence, James Duncan; Fleming, Ian; Horak, Yaroslav (2012). The James Bond Omnibus Volume 003. London: Titan. ISBN 978-0-8576-8588-9.
- Leader, Zachary (2006). The Life of Kingsley Amis. London: Jonathan Cape. ISBN 978-0-2240-6227-5.
- Lycett, Andrew (1996). Ian Fleming. London: Phoenix. ISBN 978-1-85799-783-5.
- Markham, Robert (1968). Colonel Sun. London: Jonathan Cape. OCLC 562319365.
- Palmer, Jerry (1979). Thrillers: Genesis and Structure of a Popular Genre. New York: St. Martin's Press. ISBN 978-0-3128-0347-6.
- Simpson, Paul (2020). Bond vs. Bond: The Many Faces of 007. Minneapolis, Minnesota: Quarto Publishing. ISBN 978-0-7603-6775-9.
- Van Dover, J. Kenneth (1984). Murder in the Millions: Erle Stanley Gardner, Mickey Spillane, Ian Fleming. New York: F. Ungar. ISBN 978-0-8044-2946-7.

==== Journals and magazines ====
- Beauman, Sally (10 June 1968). "Of Brooding Bondage". New York: 60.
- Enright, D. J. (28 March 1968). "Books". The Listener. p. 411.
- Hiscock, Eric (6 September 1980). "Personally Speaking". The Bookseller: 1043.
- Jens, Erik (June 2017). "Cold War Spy Fiction in Russian Popular Culture: From Suspicion to Acceptance via Seventeen Moments of Spring". Studies in Intelligence. 61 (2). Center for the Study of Intelligence: 37–48.
- Stanley, Donald (3 May 1968). "A Flabby Corporate Image for 007". Life. p. 10.

==== News ====
- Baker, Roger (30 March 1968). "No Touch". The Times. p. 21.
- "Books in Demand in April". Financial Times. London. 9 May 1968. p. 10.
- "Books in Demand in March". Financial Times. London. 16 April 1968. p. 24.
- Bradbury, Malcolm (29 March 1968). "Bond Dishonoured". The Guardian. p. 12.
- Champlin, Charles (19 May 1968). "A Second Life for Agent 007". Los Angeles Times. p. D1.
- Dugdale, John (28 March 2018). "Colonel Sun: is Kingsley Amis's Bond Novel the Weirdest of all?". The Guardian.
- Gray, Simon (28 March 1968). "Unlucky Jim". The Times Literary Supplement. p. 309.
- Markham, Robert (18 March 1968a). "Colonel Sun". The Daily Express. p. 5.
- Markham, Robert (30 March 1968b). "Colonel Sun". The Daily Express. p. 14.
- Muir, Alexander (30 March 1968). "An Invisible Enemy for the New 007". Daily Mirror. p. 21.
- Oberbeck, S. K. (5 May 1968). "The New James Bond: Calmer Music Weaker Wine". Chicago Tribune. p. Q5.
- "Obituary: James Leasor". The Times. 22 September 2007. p. 77.
- "Paperback Best Sellers". The Washington Post. 8 June 1969. p. 317.
- Richardson, Maurice (31 March 1968). "James Bond without Fleming". The Observer. p. 29.

==== Websites ====
- Clark, Gregory (2023). "The Annual RPI and Average Earnings for Britain, 1209 to Present (New Series)". MeasuringWorth.
- "Colonel Sun; A James Bond Adventure (by) Robert Markham". Library of Congress.
- "Ian Fleming's James Bond Titles". Ian Fleming Publications. Archived from the original on 10 August 2015.
- "Kingsley Amis's Colonel Sun Inspires a Scene in Spectre". Ian Fleming Publications. 27 October 2015. Archived from the original on 29 March 2023.
- Leader, Zachary (September 2011). "Amis, Sir Kingsley William". Oxford Dictionary of National Biography (online ed.). Oxford University Press. doi:10.1093/ref:odnb/60221. (Subscription, Wikipedia Library access or UK public library membership required.)
- "Titan Books – James Bond – Colonel Sun". Titan Books.
