= The James Bond Dossier =

Book by Kingsley Amis

- The first edition has artwork from the previous Bond books: For Your Eyes Only (top), Goldfinger (left), You Only Live Twice (centre), The Man with the Golden Gun (right), Thunderball (bottom)
- Author: Kingsley Amis
- Language: English
- Publisher: Jonathan Cape
- Publication date: 1965
- Publication place: United Kingdom
- Media type: Print (hardback & paperback)

The James Bond Dossier (1965), by Kingsley Amis, is a critical analysis of the James Bond novels. Amis dedicated the book to friend and background collaborator, the poet and historian Robert Conquest. Later, after Ian Fleming's death, Amis was commissioned as the first continuation novelist for the James Bond novel series, writing Colonel Sun (1968) under the pseudonym Robert Markham. The James Bond Dossier was the first, formal, literary study of the James Bond character. More recent studies of Fleming's secret agent and his world include The Politics of James Bond: From Fleming's Novels to the Big Screen (2001), by the historian Jeremy Black.

== History ==
Written at the Bond-mania's zenith in the 1960s, The James Bond Dossier is the first, thorough, albeit tongue-in-cheek, literary analysis of Ian Fleming's strengths and weaknesses as a thriller-writer. As a mainstream novelist, Kingsley Amis respected the Bond novels, especially their commercial success, believing them 'to be just as complex and to have just as much in them as more ambitious kinds of fiction'. That was a controversial approach in the 1960s, because from early on, since the mid-1950s, the James Bond novels were criticised by some detractors for their violence, male chauvinism, sexual promiscuity, racism, and anti-Communism.

Despite his intellectual respect for the Fleming canon, Amis' way of writing about it, according to his biographer Zachary Leader, "... partly guys academic procedures and pretensions by applying them to low-cultural objects" and, as such, is deliberately provocative. In that context, the Dossier can "... look like a cheeky two-fingered salute to the academic world, a farewell raspberry blown at all things pedantically donnish, in a manner Lucky Jim would surely have approved. For to Ian Fleming's œuvre Amis brought the anatomising and categorising zeal he never had devoted and never would devote to more elevated works of literature".

== From essay to book ==
Kingsley Amis had several motives for writing the Dossier. He had recently retired from teaching and wanted to "put behind him the more rigid austerities of university life". He wanted to expand his range as a writer beyond poetry and mainstream fiction. The need to make more money was also a consideration. Primarily, however, he wanted to show the academics that the literature of popular culture could be as substantive as the literature of high culture. In November 1963, he announced to Conquest the idea of writing an essay of some 5,000 words about the James Bond novels. By late 1964, he had expanded the essay to book length, and submitted it to his publisher, Jonathan Cape. In one hundred and sixty pages, The James Bond Dossier methodically catalogues and analyses the activities and minutiae of secret agent 007: the number of men he kills, the women he loves, the villains he thwarts, and the essential background of Ian Fleming's Cold War world of the 1950s.

After Fleming's death in August 1964, Glidrose Productions Ltd., owners of the international book rights, asked for Amis's editorial assessment of the uncompleted manuscript of The Man with the Golden Gun, which Jonathan Cape deemed feeble, and perhaps unpublishable. He reported that the manuscript was publishable, but would require substantial modifications. Because Amis was not the only writer consulted, it remains controversial if his editorial suggestions were implemented, and to what extent Amis contributed directly to the revision of the manuscript. In the event, the Dossier's publication was delayed a year, because Jonathan Cape asked Amis to include discussion of The Man with the Golden Gun. Both books were published in 1965; later that year, Amis reviewed The Man with the Golden Gun in the New Statesman.

== The Dossier ==
The James Bond Dossier includes most of the Bond fiction cycle, excepting Octopussy and The Living Daylights (1966), the final collection of 007 short stories, which was published after the Dossier. Kingsley Amis' argument is that the Bond novels are substantial and complex works of fiction, and certainly not, as Ian Fleming's critics said, 'a systematic onslaught on everything decent and sensible in modern life'. He viewed them as popular literature, akin to that of the science fiction texts he critiqued in New Maps of Hell (1960).

Although written in Amis' usual accessible, light-hearted style, The James Bond Dossier is neither patronising nor ironic – it is a detailed literary criticism of the Ian Fleming canon. In the main, he admires Fleming's achievement, yet does not withhold criticism where the material proves unsatisfactory or inconsistent, especially when the narration slips into 'the idiom of the novelette'. Amis reserves his most serious criticism for what he considered to be academically pretentious rejections of the Bond books, a theme implicitly informing much of the Dossier.

Each of the 14 chapters deals with one aspect of the novels – "No Woman Had Ever Held This Man" defends Bond's attitude to and treatment of women: "Bond's habitual attitude to a girl is protective, not dominating or combative"; "Damnably Clear Grey Eyes" describes M, the head of SIS: "a peevish, priggish old monster"; "A Glint of Red" is about the villains, who have in common only physical largeness and angry eyes; and so forth. According to his first biographer, Eric Jacobs, the hand of sovietologist and scholar Robert Conquest is betrayed in Amis' precise dissertation upon the genesis and changing nomenclatures of SMERSH, the employer of the villains of the early novels. Three appendices deal, respectively, with science fiction, literature and escape, and "sadism". With "almost parodic scholarly dedication", Amis provides a ten-category ("Places", "Girl", "Villain's Project", etc.) reference guide (pp. 156–159) to the Bond novels and short stories.

Typical of Amis' approach is where he suggests several implausibilities in Bond's capture by the eponymous villain Julius No in Dr. No (1958). However, that "Bond is temporarily helpless in his creator's grip", does not matter, because "three of Mr Fleming's favourite situations are about to come up one after the other. Bond is to be wined and dined, lectured on the aesthetics of power, and finally tortured by his chief enemy". Earlier, Amis had discussed the matter of Bond's correct designation: "It's inaccurate, of course, to describe James Bond as a spy, in the strict sense of one who steals or buys or smuggles the secrets of foreign powers ... Bond's claims to be considered a counter-spy, one who operates against the agents of unfriendly powers, are rather more substantial".

Although, as noted elsewhere, Amis wrote three books related to the James Bond franchise, and may or may not have contributed to one of Fleming's novels, The James Bond Dossier would end up being the only book of this type to be published under Amis's own name.

== Critical endeavours ==
In the 1968 essay "A New James Bond", anthologised in What Became of Jane Austen? And Other Questions (1970), Kingsley Amis revisits the literary character, and explains why he accepted the commission of writing Colonel Sun (1968), discusses the challenge of impersonating the writer Ian Fleming, and explores the stylistic and world-view differences among the spy novels of Ian Fleming, John le Carré, and Len Deighton. Moreover, under the pseudonym Lt.-Col. William "Bill" Tanner – M.'s chief of staff and 007's best friend in SIS – Amis wrote his second Bond book, The Book of Bond, or Every Man His Own 007 (1965), a tongue-in-cheek, how-to-manual to help every man find his own inner secret agent.

Other studies of the James Bond phenomenon include:

- Double O Seven, James Bond, A Report (1964), by O. F. Snelling (revised, re-titled, and re-published on-line, in 2007, as Double-O Seven: James Bond Under the Microscope), an analysis of Bond's literary predecessors, his image, women, adversaries, and future
- Ian Fleming: The Spy Who Came in with the Gold (1965), by Henry A. Zeiger, a biography of Fleming as a commercial writer
- The Politics of James Bond: From Fleming's Novels to the Big Screen (2001), by historian Jeremy Black, an analysis of the cultural politics of the Bond books and films
- James Bond and Philosophy: Questions Are Forever (2006), edited by James B. South and Jacob M. Held, a collection of essays which discuss ethical and moral issues arising out of the Bond stories
- The Man Who Saved Britain: A Personal Journey into the Disturbing World of James Bond (2006), by Simon Winder; a discussion of how post–Second World War England is represented in the novels and films.

== See also ==
- Outline of James Bond
