= Robert Markham =

Pseudonym for Kingsley Amis

Robert Markham is a pseudonym used by author Kingsley Amis to publish Colonel Sun in March 1968. The book was the first continuation James Bond novel following the death of Bond's creator, Ian Fleming.

== Kingsley Amis ==
Following the death of Ian Fleming on 12 August 1964, the rights to the Bond novels were held by Glidrose Publications (now Ian Fleming Publications). After Glidrose released the remaining Fleming works—The Man with the Golden Gun and Octopussy and The Living Daylights—they decided to commission a sequel in order to retain rights in the Bond product. They chose Amis to write the first continuation Bond novel; Amis had previously produced The James Bond Dossier—a critical analysis of the Bond books—under his own name, and The Book of Bond, a tongue-in-cheek manual for prospective agents, using the pseudonym Lt.-Col. William ("Bill") Tanner.

For the pseudonym, Peter Fleming - Ian Fleming's brother - initially suggested "George Glidrose". Jonathan Cape rejected this name, claiming that it had no selling or publicity power. Markham was then chosen. Despite this, Amis's involvement as continuation author was not a secret; American editions of the book identified Amis as the author, though the main Robert Markham credit remained.

== Future ideas ==
Amis had unhappily visited Mexico in January 1968. From this experience grew the idea for another Bond story. According to the New York Times Book Review, "Mr. Amis never moves about by air, and cultivated his own deficiencies - his phrase - he went from St. Louis to Mexico City by train. En route, he remembered that Bond loved trains (From Russia, with Love) and found himself plotting an assassination on a train. Then as his train moved on, there occurred the inevitable sentence, Bond had never liked Acapulco." The plot would centre around tensions between British Honduras and Guatemala over rival claims to Mexico. A syndicated Associated Press story also implied that Amis may kill Bond off for good. According to the article, a bazooka-wielding bartender would blast Bond on a train in Mexico.

Amis was inconsistent if this would result in a novel or a short story. The 1970 Associated Press story claimed it would be Amis's next book. However, in a 1968 letter to Robert Conquest, Amis clearly states that it would only be a short story. Amis also approached Glidrose with an idea for a Bond short story that would have featured a 70-year-old Bond coming out of retirement for one final mission, but permission was not granted.

== Bibliography ==
- Benson, Raymond (1988). The James Bond Bedside Companion. London: Boxtree Ltd. ISBN 1-85283-234-7.
- Black, Jeremy (2005). The politics of James Bond: from Fleming's novel to the big screen. University of Nebraska Press. ISBN 978-0-8032-6240-9.
- Hart-Davis, Duff (1987). Peter Fleming: a biography. Oxford: Oxford University Press. ISBN 978-0-19-282034-1. First published by Jonathan Cape in 1974.
- Laskowski, William E. (1998). Kingsley Amis. London: Twayne Publishers. ISBN 978-0-8057-1663-4.
- Leader, Zachary (2000). The Letters of Kingsley Amis. London: HarperCollins. ISBN 978-0-00-257095-4.
