= The Book of Bond =

Book by Kingsley Amis

- First edition
- Author: Kingsley Amis
- Language: English
- Genre: Comedy Self-parody
- Publisher: Jonathan Cape
- Publication date: 1965
- Publication place: United Kingdom
- Media type: Print (Hardback & Paperback)
- Pages: 111 pp

The Book of Bond or, Every Man His Own 007 is a book by Kingsley Amis which was first published by Jonathan Cape in 1965. For this work, Amis used the pseudonym Lt.-Col. William ("Bill") Tanner. In Ian Fleming's James Bond novels, Bill Tanner is M's chief of staff and a recurring character throughout the series.

A tongue-in-cheek work, published by the same company that issued the Bond novels, The Book of Bond is a manual for prospective agents on how to live like Agent 007, illustrated with examples taken from the Fleming canon.

The first edition of this book was published with a false slipcover printed with the title The Bible to be Read as Literature. In one of the early Bond novels, Bond carries his gun in a hollowed out book of this title.

Amis, a close friend of Fleming, was also responsible for two other works related to the James Bond series. In 1965, he wrote The James Bond Dossier, a collection of essays on the book and film series, and in 1968, under the pseudonym Robert Markham, he wrote the Bond novel Colonel Sun.

The book was described as "a tongue-in-cheek guide to becoming a secret agent."

== See also ==
- Outline of James Bond
