= O. F. Snelling =

O. F. (Oswald Frederick) Snelling
- Born: 30 December 1916; London, England
- Died: 6 November 2001 (aged 84)
- Occupation: Author/Antiquarian

O. F. Snelling (30 December 1916 – 6 November 2001) was an author and auctioneer clerk in the antiquarian book trade.

== Career ==
Oswald Frederick Snelling is best known for his 1964 bestseller, Double O Seven, James Bond, A Report, and is also noted for his books and articles on boxing and British thriller writers.

Snelling began his working life as an illustrator of books. After serving in the British Army in World War II, he wrote book reviews, film criticism and articles on sports for magazines such as The Leader and Band Wagon. He wrote three books under the pen-name "Oswald Frederick” including a quiz book, Fight Quiz (1946), and two boxer biographies, Battling Bruce: The Fighting Career and Rise to Fame of Bruce Woodcock (1946) and White Hope: The Story of the Jack Johnson Era (1947).

Needing more secure employment, Snelling took a job in the antiquarian book trade, working first as a clerk at Hodgson's in 1949, later Sotheby's Rare Book Department, and became Chief Clerk until the firm was closed in 1981. It was there he met author Ian Fleming, assisting him in research for the James Bond novels.

== Books ==
=== James Bond books ===
Snelling is best known for his 1964 analysis of the James Bond books, Double O Seven, James Bond, A Report, the only such title personally authorized by Ian Fleming. Part of the book’s initial success was that its publication roughly coincided with the death of Fleming in August 1964 and included footnotes discussing the recently issued Bond novel, You Only Live Twice. Focused on the literary 007 with passing mentions of the first Sean Connery films, Snelling examined the predecessors to Bond, his adversaries, and especially the women in the novels. Knowing novelist Kingsley Amis was also working on a similar study (published as The James Bond Dossier in 1965), Snelling rushed out his book to compete with Amis, and the two titles have been frequently compared ever since as the earliest serious studies of the James Bond phenomena. Snelling’s title sold over a million copies, appeared in French, Dutch, Portuguese, Japanese, and Israeli editions and translations, and it came out in the United States in 1965 under the imprint of the New American Library, Ian Fleming's own publishers.

=== The Spy connection ===
Before his Bond success, Snelling became acquainted with Peter and Helen Kroger, who, using the cover of booksellers, assisted Soviet spy Konon Molody who had appropriated the identity of a Canadian, Gordon Lonsdale. Snelling acquired books to help Lonsdale write while in prison before the agent was exchanged in a spy trade in 1964. In 1965, Snelling went to Russia to meet Lonsdale again and negotiated the writing and publication of his memoirs, Spy (1965). It is not known if Snelling knew the memoir was completely fraudulent, as this “Lonsdale” continued to pass himself for the identity he had been assigned by his Russian masters.

=== Other books ===
Adding to his books on boxing, Snelling wrote A Bedside Book of Boxing (1972). In 1980 he wrote articles for The Antiquarian Book Monthly Review which became the basis for his next book, Rare Books and Rarer People: Some Personal Reminiscences of “The Trade.” (1982)

=== Online Edition ===
In 2007, an online edition of his Bond book was published using the title he’d have preferred, Double-O-Seven: James Bond Under the Microscope. It included a 1980 introduction Snelling had written for a hoped for new release of his 1964 best-seller. Accompanying the new publication was a collection of selected correspondence between Snelling and his literary executor, Ronald Payne, written between 1979 and 1994.

== Death ==
After the death of his third wife, Molly, Snelling never recovered from the blow and largely remained a recluse to the end of his life. He died on 6 November 2001 aged 84.
