= The Zakhov Mission =

1959 spy novel by Andrei Gulyashki

First UK edition

The Zakhov Mission (Bulgarian: Случаят в Момчилово, The Momchilovo Affair) is an espionage detective novel by the Bulgarian author Andrei Gulyashki first published in 1959 under the title Контраразузнаване (Counterintelligence). The English translation is by Maurice Michael, published in the UK in 1968 by Cassell, London, and in USA in 1969 by Doubleday, N.Y. (ISBN 0-304-92178-5).

The protagonist of the novel, Avakum Zakhov, is a Bulgarian counter-espionage operative, who foils a sabotage ploy in a small Bulgarian village close to the southern border (i.e. with Turkey or Greece). Avakum Zakhov was intended as a Bulgarian version of Sherlock Holmes: a solitary bachelor, who enjoys the rainy weather, loves to smoke his pipe by the fire, and solves detective mysteries by keen observation and deductive reasoning.

The book spawned a series of Zakhov books, which became best-sellers in the Eastern Bloc. The first four books of this series have also been translated into many languages and provided the inspiration for the popular Bulgarian television series The Adventures of Avakum Zakhov.
