= M (James Bond) =

James Bond character

- James Bond character
- First appearance: Casino Royale (1953)
- Created by: Ian Fleming
- Portrayed by: Bernard Lee (1962–1979); John Huston (1967); David Niven (1967); Edward Fox (1983); Robert Brown (1983–1989); Judi Dench (1995–2015); Ralph Fiennes (2012–2021)
- Voiced by: Judi Dench (2004–2012); Priyanga Burford (2026)

In-universe information
- Occupation: Head of MI6
- Nationality: British

M is a codename held by a fictional character in Ian Fleming's James Bond book and film series; the character is the Chief of the Secret Intelligence Service for the agency known as MI6. Fleming based the character on a number of people he knew who commanded sections of British intelligence. M has appeared in the novels by Fleming and seven continuation authors, as well as appearing in twenty-four films. In the Eon Productions series of films, M has been portrayed by four actors: Bernard Lee, Robert Brown, Judi Dench and Ralph Fiennes, the most recent to hold the role; in the two independent productions, M was played by John Huston, David Niven and Edward Fox. Dench provided her likeness and voice as M in several James Bond video games based on the film series, while an original incarnation of the character conceived for the game 007 First Light (2026) is portrayed by Priyanga Burford.

== Background ==
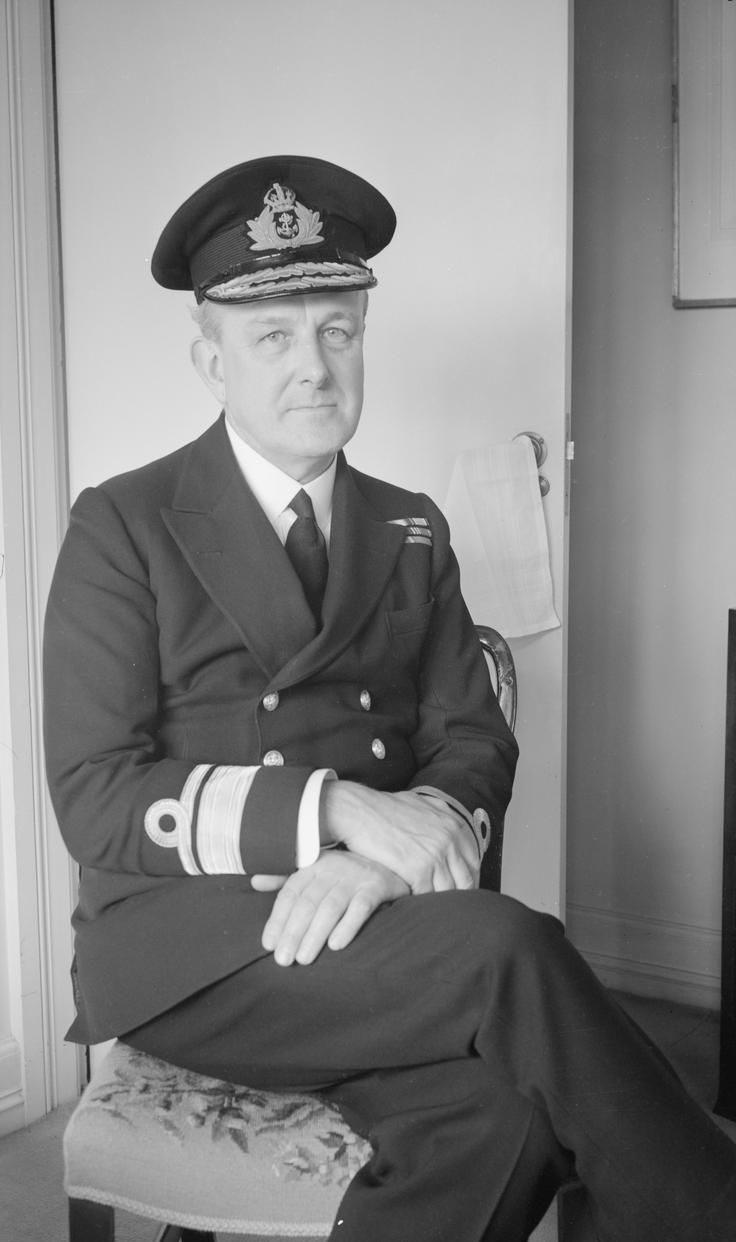
Rear Admiral John Henry Godfrey, Fleming's superior at the Naval Intelligence Division and a basis for M.

Ian Fleming based much of M's character on Rear Admiral John Godfrey, who was Fleming's superior at the Naval Intelligence Division during the Second World War. After Fleming's death, Godfrey complained "He turned me into that unsavoury character, M."

Other possible inspirations include Lieutenant Colonel Sir Claude Dansey, the deputy head of MI6 and head of the wartime Z network, who achieved different interpretations of his character from those who knew him: Malcolm Muggeridge thought him "the only professional in MI6", while Hugh Trevor-Roper considered Dansey to be "an utter shit, corrupt, incompetent, but with a certain low cunning". A further inspiration for M was Maxwell Knight, the head of MI5, who signed his memos as "M" and whom Fleming knew well. The tradition of the head of MI6 signing their name with a single letter came from Mansfield Smith-Cumming, who would sign his initial "C", with green ink.

Another possibility for the model of M was William Melville, an Irishman who became the head of the Secret Service Bureau, the forerunner of both MI5 and MI6: Melville was referred to within government circles as M. Melville recruited Sidney Reilly into government service and foiled an assassination plot against Queen Victoria on her 1887 Golden Jubilee. Fleming's biographer John Pearson also hypothesised that Fleming's characterisation of M reflects memories of his mother:

There is reason for thinking that a more telling lead to the real identity of M lies in the fact that as a boy Fleming often called his mother M. ... While Fleming was young, his mother was certainly one of the few people he was frightened of, and her sternness toward him, her unexplained demands, and her remorseless insistence on success find a curious and constant echo in the way M handles that hard-ridden, hard-killing agent, 007.

— John Pearson, The Life of Ian Fleming

== Novels ==
Fleming's third Bond novel, Moonraker, establishes M's initials as "M**** M*******" and his first name is subsequently revealed to be Miles. In the final novel of the series, The Man with the Golden Gun, M's full identity is revealed as Vice Admiral Sir Miles Messervy KCMG; Messervy had been appointed Chief of the Secret Intelligence Service after his predecessor had been assassinated at his desk.

A naval theme runs throughout Fleming's description of M and his surroundings, and his character was described by journalist Ben Macintyre as "every inch the naval martinet". Macintyre wrote that in his study of Fleming's work, Kingsley Amis outlined the way Fleming had described M's voice, being: angry (three times); brutal, cold (seven times); curt, dry (five times); gruff (seven times); stern, testy (five times).

Over the course of twelve novels and two collections of short stories, Fleming provided a number of details relating to M's background and character. In On Her Majesty's Secret Service it is revealed that M's pay as head of the Secret Service is £6,500 a year (£118,723 in 2025 pounds), £1,500 of which comes from retired naval pay. Although his pay is good for the 1950s and 1960s, it is never explained how M received or can afford his membership at Blades, an upscale private club for gentlemen he frequents in London to gamble and dine. Blades has a restricted membership of only 200 gentlemen and all must be able to show £100,000 (£1,826,508 in 2025 pounds) in cash or gilt-edged securities. Kingsley Amis noted in his study, The James Bond Dossier, that on M's salary his membership of the club would have been puzzling. As a personal favour to M, the staff at Blades keeps a supply of cheap red wine from Algeria on hand but does not include it on the wine list. M refers to it as "Infuriator" and tends only to drink it in moderate quantities unless he is in a very bad mood.

The academic Paul Stock argues that M's office is a metonym for England and a stable point from which Bond departs on a mission, whilst he sees M as being an iconic representative of England and Englishness.

In the first post-Fleming book, Colonel Sun, M is kidnapped from Quarterdeck, his home, and Bond goes to great lengths to rescue him. The later continuation books, written by John Gardner, retain Sir Miles Messervy as M, who protects Bond from the new, less aggressive climate in the Secret Service, saying that at some point Britain will need "a blunt instrument". In Gardner's final novel, COLD, M is kidnapped and rescued by Bond and finishes the book by retiring from MI6. Continuation Bond author Raymond Benson's 1998 novel The Facts of Death continued Messervy's retirement, where he still resides in Quarterdeck. The book also introduces a new M, Barbara Mawdsley, based on Judi Dench's character in the Pierce Brosnan films.

== Films ==
=== Eon Productions films ===
==== Bernard Lee: 1962–1979 ====
Bernard Lee portrayed M from 1962 to 1979

M was played by Bernard Lee from the first Bond film, Dr. No (1962), until Moonraker (1979). In line with Fleming's character, he is given the name of Miles in The Spy Who Loved Me. In Dr. No M refers to his record of reducing the number of operative casualties since taking the job, implying someone else held the job recently before him. The film also saw M refer to himself as head of MI7; Lee had originally said MI6, but was overdubbed with the name MI7 prior to the film's release. Earlier in the film, the department had been referred to as MI6 by a radio operator.

A number of Bond scholars have noted that Lee's interpretation of the character was in line with the original literary representation; John Cork and Collin Stutz observed that Lee was "very close to Fleming's version of the character", while Rubin commented on the serious, efficient, no-nonsense authority figure. Jim Smith and Stephen Lavington, meanwhile, remarked that Lee was "the very incarnation of Fleming's crusty admiral".

Lee died of cancer in January 1981, four months into the filming of For Your Eyes Only and before any of his scenes could be filmed. Out of respect, no new actor was hired to assume the role and, instead, the script was re-written so that the character is said to be on leave, with his lines given to either his Chief of Staff Bill Tanner or the Minister of Defence, Sir Frederick Gray. Later films referred to Lee's tenure as head of the service, with a painting of him as M in MI6's Scottish headquarters during the 1999 instalment The World Is Not Enough.

Appearances in:

- Dr. No (1962)
- From Russia with Love (1963)
- Goldfinger (1964)
- Thunderball (1965)
- You Only Live Twice (1967)
- On Her Majesty's Secret Service (1969)
- Diamonds Are Forever (1971)
- Live and Let Die (1973)
- The Man with the Golden Gun (1974)
- The Spy Who Loved Me (1977)
- Moonraker (1979)

Lee's likeness was used in the 2005 video game James Bond 007: From Russia with Love.

==== Robert Brown: 1983–1989 ====
Robert Brown portrayed M from 1983 to 1989

After Lee's death in 1981, the producers hired the actor Robert Brown to play M in Octopussy. Brown had previously played Admiral Hargreaves, Flag Officer Submarines, in the 1977 film, The Spy Who Loved Me. Bond scholars Steven Jay Rubin, John Cork, and Collin Stutz all consider Admiral Hargreaves would have been appointed to the role of M, rather than Brown playing a different character as M.

Pfeiffer and Worrall considered that whilst Brown looks perfect, the role had been softened from that of Lee; they also considered him "far too avuncular", although in Licence to Kill they remarked that he came across as being very effective as he removed Bond's double-0 licence. Continuation author Raymond Benson agrees, noting that the M role was "once again under written, and Brown is not allowed the opportunity to explore and reveal his character traits"; Benson also considered the character to be "too nice". In No Time to Die (2021), Brown's M is briefly seen in a portrait at the office of the incumbent M (Ralph Fiennes) opposite a portrait of Judi Dench's M.

Appearances in:

- Octopussy (1983)
- A View to a Kill (1985)
- The Living Daylights (1987)
- Licence to Kill (1989)

==== Judi Dench: 1995–2015 ====
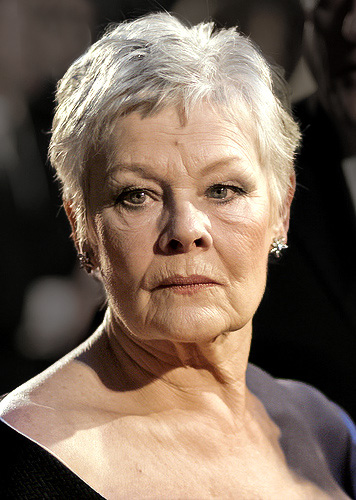
Judi Dench portrayed M from 1995 to 2015.

After the long period between Licence to Kill and GoldenEye, the producers brought in Dame Judi Dench to take over as the new M replacing Robert Brown. The character is based on Stella Rimington, the real-life head of MI5 between 1992 and 1996. For GoldenEye, Dench's M is cold, blunt and initially dislikes Bond, whom she calls a "sexist, misogynist dinosaur, a relic of the Cold War". Tanner, her Chief of Staff, refers to her during the film as "the Evil Queen of Numbers", given her reputation at that stage for relying on statistics and analysis rather than impulse and initiative.

Following Pierce Brosnan's departure from the role as Bond, Dench continued playing M for the 2006 film Casino Royale, which rebooted the series with Daniel Craig playing Bond at the beginning of his career. In this new continuity, M has worked for MI6 for some time, at one point muttering "Christ, I miss the Cold War". As explained in Skyfall, M was previously in charge of MI6's operations in Hong Kong during the 1990s. Her ability to run MI6 has been questioned more than once; in Casino Royale, she is the subject of a review when Bond is caught shooting an unarmed prisoner and blowing up a foreign embassy on camera; in Quantum of Solace, the Foreign Secretary orders her to personally withdraw Bond from the field in Bolivia and to stop any investigations into Dominic Greene's eco-terrorist organisation; and in Skyfall, she is the subject of a public inquiry when MI6 loses a computer hard drive containing the identities of undercover agents around the world. Skyfall marked Dench's seventh appearance as M, where she is targeted by former MI6 agent Raoul Silva, whom she turned over to the Chinese in order to save six other agents. She assists Bond with making booby traps in expectation of Silva's forces coming to attack them at Bond's old family estate, Skyfall, in Scotland. She is shot and wounded, and eventually succumbs to her wounds in the film, making her the only M to die in the Eon Bond films.

Dench's M has a speaking line for the final time in Spectre. In the film, M appears in a video will, giving Bond a final order to hunt down and terminate someone, which ultimately leads him to the film's titular criminal organisation. In No Time to Die (2021), Dench's M is briefly seen in a portrait at the new M's (Ralph Fiennes) office, opposite a portrait of Robert Brown's M.

There have also been brief references to M's family: in GoldenEye, she responds to Tanner calling her the "Evil Queen of Numbers" by telling him that when she wants to hear sarcasm she will listen to her children. Quantum of Solace director Marc Forster suggested that Dench's casting gave the character maternal overtones in her relationship with Bond, overtones made overt in Skyfall, in which Silva repeatedly refers to her as "Mother" and "Mommy" [sic]. In Skyfall she is revealed to be a widow.

An inscribed box following her death in Skyfall reveals her name to be Olivia Mansfield.

Appearances in:

- GoldenEye (1995)
- Tomorrow Never Dies (1997)
- The World Is Not Enough (1999)
- Die Another Day (2002)
- Casino Royale (2006)
- Quantum of Solace (2008)
- Skyfall (2012)
- Spectre (2015, cameo)

Dench also appeared in seven James Bond video games:

- The World Is Not Enough (2000) – is a playable character
- James Bond 007: Everything or Nothing (2004)
- GoldenEye: Rogue Agent (2004)
- 007: Quantum of Solace (2008)
- GoldenEye 007 (2010)
- James Bond 007: Blood Stone (2010)
- 007 Legends (2012)

==== Ralph Fiennes: 2012–2021 ====
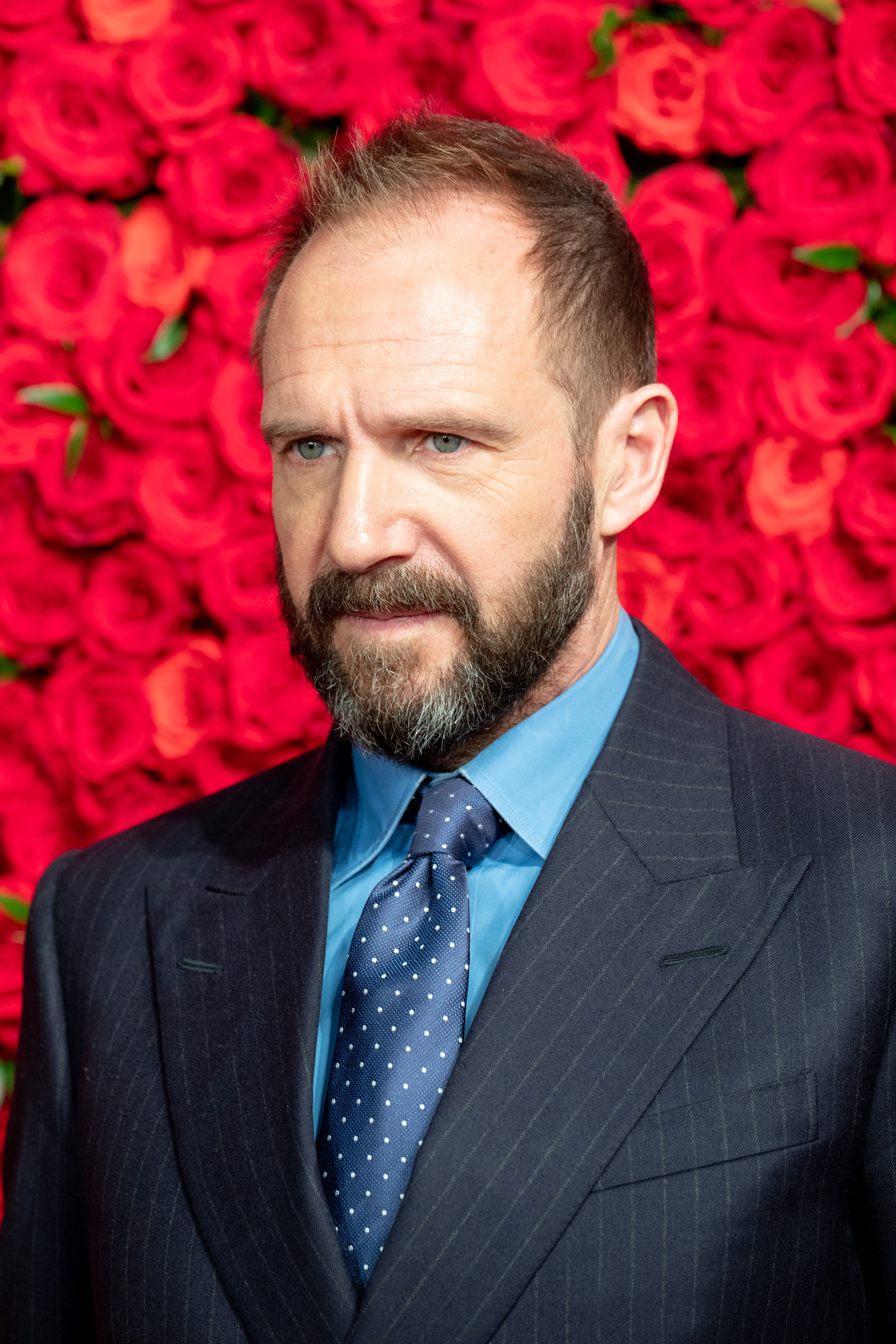
Ralph Fiennes, the incumbent actor of the role

After the death of Dame Judi Dench's M at the end of Skyfall, she is succeeded by Gareth Mallory, played by Ralph Fiennes. Mallory had been the Chairman of the Intelligence and Security Committee prior to heading MI6, and is a former lieutenant colonel in the British Army. He served in Northern Ireland (with the Special Air Service) during the Troubles, where he had been held hostage by the Irish Republican Army for three months. In Spectre, the 00 Section of MI6 is briefly dismantled in addition to Mallory being demoted. He assists Bond in the field when it is revealed that the Nine Eyes initiative is part of Spectre's plan for world domination. In No Time to Die, Mallory authorises the development of Project Heracles, a DNA-targeting nanobot bioweapon. Project Heracles is stolen by Spectre and falls into the hands of Lyutsifer Safin, eventually leading to the death of Bond as he sacrifices his life in order for the weapon to be completely destroyed. Mallory eulogises Bond at the end of the film.

Mallory is the first M in the Eon series whose real name is known from the start, and he continues to be referred to both as M and as Mallory throughout the films.

Appearances in:

- Skyfall (2012)
- Spectre (2015)
- No Time to Die (2021)

=== Non-Eon films ===
==== John Huston/David Niven: 1967 ====
The 1967 film Casino Royale had not one but two Ms. The first is played by John Huston, who also co-directed. In this film, M's real name is McTarry and he is accidentally killed when, in order to get Bond out of retirement, he orders the military to fire mortars at Bond's mansion when the retired spy refuses to return to duty. The first quarter of the film depicts Bond's subsequent visit to McTarry Castle in Scotland, on a quest to return the only piece of M's remains recovered after the attack—his bright red toupée. Subsequently, Bond—played by David Niven—becomes the new M and proceeds to order that all MI6 agents, male and female, be renamed "James Bond 007" in order to confuse the enemy.

==== Edward Fox: 1983 ====
Edward Fox as M in Never Say Never Again

In 1983's Never Say Never Again, Edward Fox played M as a bureaucrat, contemptuous of Bond—far removed from the relationship shared between Bernard Lee's M and Sean Connery's Bond in the original Eon films; the academic Jeremy Black notes that the contempt felt for the 00 section by Fox's M was reciprocated by Connery's Bond. Fox's M is also younger than any of the previous portrayals, and his portrayal is the only instance to date of the actor playing M being younger than the actor playing Bond. The media historian James Chapman notes that while M considers Bond to be an out-dated relic, the Foreign Secretary orders the 00 section to be re-activated.

== Outside the James Bond series ==
Several past incarnations of M appear in Alan Moore and Kevin O'Neill's The League of Extraordinary Gentlemen. The first, later revealed to be James Moriarty, created and directed the eponymous League in 1898 to win a gang war against Fu Manchu. Following Moriarty's death, Mycroft Holmes assumed the role of M. In the sequel volume The Black Dossier, Harry Lime, the head of the British secret service, assumed the role of M amidst a moribund and dystopian 1950s post-war Britain. In the final volume Century, the elderly Emma Peel assumed the role of M as of 2009.

The James Moriarty incarnation of M appears in the first volume's 2003 film adaptation, portrayed by Richard Roxburgh.

M is portrayed by Cary Elwes as Ian Fleming's superior in the film The Ministry of Ungentlemanly Warfare, a fictionalized account of Operation Postmaster.

== See also ==
- Q (James Bond)

== Bibliography ==
- Amis, Kingsley (1966). The James Bond Dossier. London: Pan Books. OCLC 752401390.
- Benson, Raymond (1988). The James Bond Bedside Companion. London: Boxtree Ltd. ISBN 1-85283-234-7.
- Black, Jeremy (2005). The politics of James Bond: from Fleming's novel to the big screen. University of Nebraska Press. ISBN 978-0-8032-6240-9.
- Chapman, James (2009). Licence to Thrill: A cultural history of the James Bond films. New York: I.B. Tauris. ISBN 978-1-84511-515-9.
- Comentale, Edward P; Watt, Stephen; Willman, Skip (2005). Ian Fleming & James Bond: the cultural politics of 007. Indiana University Press. ISBN 978-0-253-21743-1.
- Cork, John; Stutz, Collin (2007). James Bond encyclopedia. London: Dorling Kindersley. ISBN 978-1-4053-3427-3.
- Griswold, John (2006). Ian Fleming's James Bond: annotations and chronologies for Ian Fleming's Bond stories. AuthorHouse. ISBN 1-4259-3100-6.
- Jütting, Kerstin (2007). "Grow Up, 007!" – James Bond over the decades: formula vs. innovation. GRIN Verlag. ISBN 978-3-638-85372-9.
- Lane, Andy; Simpson, Paul (2002). The Bond Files: An Unofficial Guide to the World's Greatest Secret Agent. London: Virgin Books. ISBN 978-0-7535-0712-4.
- Lejeune, Anthony (1979). The gentlemen's clubs of London. London: Mayflower Books. ISBN 978-0-8317-3800-6.
- Lindner, Christoph (2009). The James Bond Phenomenon: a Critical Reader. Manchester University Press. ISBN 978-0-7190-6541-5.
- Macintyre, Ben (2008). For Your Eyes Only. London: Bloomsbury Publishing. ISBN 978-0-7475-9527-4.
- McKay, Sinclair (2008). The man with the golden touch: how the Bond films conquered the world. London: Aurum Press. ISBN 978-1-84513-355-9.
- Morrison, Grant (2011). Supergods. London: Random House. ISBN 978-0-224-08996-8.
- Pearson, John (1966). The Life of Ian Fleming. London: Pan Books. ISBN 0-330-02082-X.
- Pfeiffer, Lee; Worrall, Dave (1998). The essential Bond. London: Boxtree Ltd. ISBN 978-0-7522-2477-0.
- Rimington, Stella (2008). Open secret: the autobiography of the former Director-General of MI5. London: Arrow Books. ISBN 978-0-09-943672-0.
- Rubin, Steven Jay (2003). The complete James Bond movie encyclopedia. New York: McGraw-Hill. ISBN 0-07-141246-8.
- Simpson, Paul (2002). The rough guide to James Bond. Rough Guides. ISBN 978-1-84353-142-5.
- Smith, Jim; Lavington, Stephen (2002). Bond films. London: Virgin Books. ISBN 978-0-7535-0709-4.
- Stock, Paul (2009). "Dial 'M' for metonym: Universal Exports, M's office space and empire". In Lindner, Christoph (ed.). The James Bond Phenomenon: a Critical Reader. Manchester: Manchester University Press. ISBN 978-0-7190-6541-5.
- Vice magazine (2011). The World According to Vice. Edinburgh: Canongate Books. ISBN 978-0-85786-024-8.
- West, Nigel (2010). Historical dictionary of Ian Fleming's world of intelligence: fact and fiction. Lanham, Maryland: Scarecrow Press. ISBN 978-0-7524-2896-3.
