= Double O Seven, James Bond, A Report =

Book by O. F. Snelling

- Title page for Double O Seven, James Bond, A Report
- Author: O. F. Snelling
- Language: English
- Subject: James Bond
- Genre: Critical analysis
- Publication date: 1964

Double O Seven, James Bond, A Report (1964), by O. F. (Oswald Frederick) Snelling, is the first book-length, critical analysis of the James Bond novels, and the only such study Ian Fleming approved. It was published in August 1964, the month when Fleming died, a coincidence that earned the book's first edition a wide readership.

A lifelong devotee of British thriller writers, Snelling was a professional antiquarian working in the Hodgson auction house, where he met Ian Fleming, who had gone there to do research. In the course of writing James Bond, A Report, he learned that novelist Kingsley Amis also was writing a like study, so, Snelling worked quickly to ensure that his book would be published first. He succeeded; Amis's scholarly, literary, critical study, The James Bond Dossier (1965), was published in late 1965. Since then, the books are compared; some aficionados consider Snelling's book the superior contribution to the field of critical literary studies of James Bond. In Britain, Panther Books reprinted Double O Seven, James Bond, A Report in paperback; it was translated to and published in French, Dutch, Portuguese, Japanese, and Hebrew editions. In the U.S., the New American Library, Fleming's North American publishers, issued it in 1965.

== Literary critique ==
O.F. Snelling's literary criticism of agent 007 is a five-part report. First, “His Predecessors”, observes the similarities among the upper-class “Clubland Tradition” novelists John Buchan, Sapper (H. C. McNeile), and Dornford Yates (Cecil William Mercer) and their influence upon the writer Ian Fleming. Second, “His Image” analyses the character, James Bond, secret agent 007 of the British Secret Service. Third, “His Women”, the longest section, examines and explores the women and Bond's relationships with them, and how they — the man and the women — changed in the series’ course. Fourth, “His Adversaries” examines the villains — Le Chiffre, Dr. No, Mister Big, Ernst Stavro Blofeld et al. — and describes their social, political, and personal motivations for doing evil, especially against Britain. The final, fifth section, “His Future” examines the literary and cinematic possibilities for the Bond character in 1964 — when Fleming was still writing. Moreover, given the business exigencies of publishing, You Only Live Twice (1964), then the latest novel, published in March 1964, Snelling incorporated to his Report only by way of footnotes.

The final page of Double O Seven, James Bond, A Report is an in-joke, between writer and reader, a reproduction of the watermark Snelling noticed in his typing paper: “64 Mill Bond — Extra Strong”.

== Revised edition ==
Decades after original publication in 1964, O. F. Snelling hoped to publish Double O Seven: James Bond Under the Microscope a revised and updated edition including proper discussions of You Only Live Twice (1964) and The Man with the Golden Gun (1965), Fleming's last two novels, and the short stories in Octopussy and The Living Daylights (1966); the last two books had been published posthumously and after the original Report’s 1964 publication. The title of the new edition is in fact was Snelling’s original, full title for the 1964 edition of the Report, which had been retitled by the publisher — against Snelling’s wishes. The new edition would also include discussions of the Kingsley Amis and John Gardner continuation novels, and the film series, which had been touched on only incidentally in the 1964 edition.

In 1980, he wrote “Apropos Double O Seven” a preface to Double O Seven: James Bond Under the Microscope, but the revised, updated, and re-titled book went unpublished until 2007, when Ronald Payne, his literary executor, published it online; it includes a collection of Snelling–Payne correspondence. In the preface and the writer–executor correspondence, Snelling stresses his preference for the literary 007, because he felt the film series’ interpretation, especially Roger Moore’s entries, abandoned the adult secret agent character Ian Fleming created; ultimately, O. F. Snelling lost interest in all things Bond.

== See also ==
- Outline of James Bond
