= Avakoum Zahov versus 07 =

- Author: Andrei Gulyashki
- Original title: Срещу 07
- Language: Bulgarian
- Publication date: 1966
- English publication date: 1967

Avakoum Zakhov vs. 07 (Bulgarian: Срещу 07) is an espionage novel by the Bulgarian author Andrei Gulyashki first published in 1966 and translated into English in 1967 (Sydney, Australia: Scripts. Paperback. 1967).

== Publication history ==
Western press compared Gulyashki's fictional detective Avakoum Zakhov with James Bond. There is a story that when Gulyashki wrote the book about a "match" of Zakhov vs. Bond and Western film directors, when learned about this, offered to film it. However an unexpected obstacle arose against the book from the Communist Party-dominated Bulgarian Writers' Union, who accused Gulyashki in the treason of the Socialist Realism, and the book was not printed. However Gulyashki outwits the bureaucrats and prints the novel in a serialized form in Narodna Mladezh [National Youth] newspaper, under a cryptic title, with one zero removed: Срещу 07 [Versus 07] (later translated as Avakoum Zahov versus 07) and where the name Bond is never mentioned. The title allegedly lost a zero due to the objections of Ian Fleming's publisher, Glidrose Productions.

== Synopsis ==
Avakum Zakhov's mission in Avakoum Zakhov vs. 07 was not to kill James Bond (or 07), but to protect the Soviet scientist Konstantin Trofimov. 07's mission was to kidnap the Soviet scientist and steal the secrets of his invention (a kind of a powerful "ray").

07 wins the first round: while the professor attends a symposium in the Bulgarian city of Varna, 07 manages to kidnap him and his secretary Natalia, and to take them to a ship headed south. Zakhov is in hot pursuit and manages to sneak onto 07's ship under a false identity. At the end of the story, 07, Zakhov, the professor, and Natalia find themselves shipwrecked on an icy island near Antarctica. 07 is awaiting help from the U.S. icebreaker Franklin, while Zakhov is awaiting a plane from the Soviet polar station Mirny.

There are some minor discrepancies between the Bulgarian original and the English translation, and a significant one at the end. In the English version, the book ends with a hand-to-hand fight between the two superheroes, and 07 is pushed into the icy precipice, presumably to his death.

In the original, the two adversaries exchange threats, but do not touch each other. The plane from Mirny arrives, while Franklin is still a few hours away. While Avakoum and Konstantin Trofimov's secretary Natalia are busy getting the professor into the plane, 07 manages to disappear. Although morally defeated and unsuccessful in his mission, 07 remains alive, and even free.

== See also ==
- Outline of James Bond
