= Andrei Gulyashki =

Bulgarian writer (1914–1995)

Andrei Stoyanov Gulyashki (Bulgarian: Андрей Стоянов Гуляшки) (7 May 1914 – 3 June 1995) was a Bulgarian writer best known for the exploits of his character, detective Avakoum Zakhov.

Avakoum Zakhov first appeared in a 1959 novel Контраразузнаване (reissued as Случаят в Момчилово, translated into English as The Zakhov Mission) and he is the protagonist of several more novels. Western press compared Zakhov with James Bond, and Gulyashki wrote the book about a "match" of Zakhov vs. Bond Avakoum Zahov versus 07, although the name Bond is never mentioned in the book and 007 is replaced with 07, due to copyright issues. The title allegedly lost a zero due to the objections of Ian Fleming's publisher, Glidrose Productions.

Gulyashki received several state and literary awards and was member of the National Assembly, the Bulgarian parliament, of 6th, 7th, and 8th convocations.

== Works ==
- Дон Кихот от Селвеция, 1936 (Don Quixote of Selvezia)
- Жени, 1938 (Women)
- Смъртна присъда, 1940 (Death Sentence)
- МТ станция, 1950 (MT Station)
- Село Ведрово, 1952 (Vedrovo Village)
- Златното руно, 1958 (The Golden Fleece)
- Контраразузнаване, 1959 (Counterintelligence)
- Случаят в Момчилово, 1960 (The Momchilovo Affair/The Zakhov Mission)
- Приключение в полунощ, 1960 (Midnight Adventure)
- Спящата красавица, 1961 (Sleeping Beauty)
- Приключенията на Авакум Захов, 1962 (Adventures of Avakoum Zahov)
- През една дъждовна есен, 1963 (In a Rainy Autumn)
- Седемте дни на нашия живот, 1964 (Seven days of our Live)
- Малка нощна музика, 1965 (A Little night music)
- Срещу 07, 1966 (Avakoum Zahov versus 07)
- Романтична повест, 1970 (Romantic Story)
- Златният век, 1973 (The Golden Age)
- Последното приключение на Авакум Захов, 1976 (The Last Adventure of Avakoum Zahov)
- Домът с махагоново стълбище, 1978 (The house with the mahogany staircase)
- Открадването на Даная, 1978 (The Stealing of Danae)
- Златната жена, 1980 (The Golden Woman)
- Скитник броди по света, 1982 (A Tramp Wanders the World)
- Убийството на улица Чехов, 1985 (Murder on Chekhov Street)
- История с кучета, 1985 (A Story from Dogs)
- Краят на Лалелия, 1987 (The End of Lalelia)
- Чудакът (The Freak) 1986
- Ексцентрикът (Eccentric)
- Романтични приключения, 1988 (Romantic adventures)
- Виелица, 1988 (A blizzard)
- На чашка коняк, 1989 (A glass of cognac)
- Яков и дявола, 1981 (Jacob and the devil)
