= Bill Tanner =

Fictional character in the James Bond franchise

- James Bond character
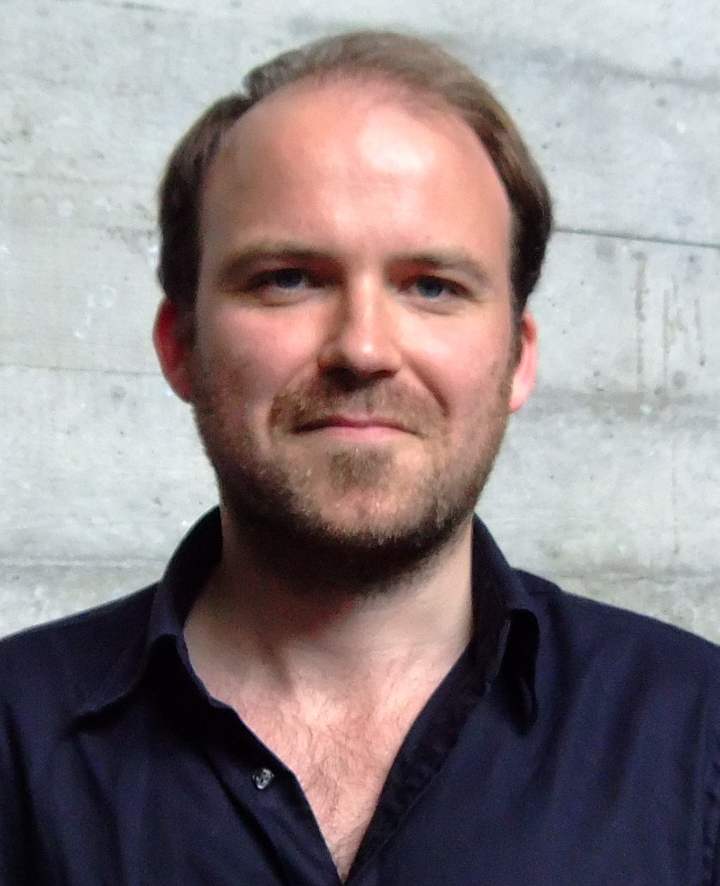
- Rory Kinnear, the incumbent actor of the role
- Created by: Ian Fleming
- Portrayed by: Michael Goodliffe (1974); James Villiers (1981); Michael Kitchen (1995–1999); Rory Kinnear (2008–2021)

In-universe information
- Full name: William Tanner
- Gender: Male
- Occupation: Chief of Staff
- Affiliation: MI6
- Nationality: British
- Classification: Ally

William "Bill" Tanner is a fictional character in the James Bond film and novel series. Tanner is an employee of the Secret Intelligence Service (MI6) who acts as M's chief of staff.

== Novels ==
In Ian Fleming's novels, Bill Tanner is MI6's chief of staff. He appears infrequently in the novels, but is a regular character in the later continuation series by John Gardner.

Described as a brisk, dark-haired man, and a former officer in the "Sappers" (Royal Engineers) (at "nearly their maximum height of 5'6"), Tanner appears to be one of James Bond's only close friends in MI6; they lunch together occasionally, and he is generally sympathetic when Bond has been dressed down by M.

In 1965, Kingsley Amis wrote The Book of Bond or Every Man His Own 007, a tongue-in-cheek manual for prospective secret agents, illustrated with examples from Fleming's novels. For this work, Amis used the pseudonym "Lt. Colonel William ('Bill') Tanner".

== Film appearances ==
Film	Year	Portrayed by
The Man with the Golden Gun	1974	Michael Goodliffe (uncredited)
For Your Eyes Only	1981	James Villiers
GoldenEye	1995	Michael Kitchen
The World Is Not Enough	1999	Michael Kitchen
Quantum of Solace	2008	Rory Kinnear
Skyfall	2012	Rory Kinnear
Spectre	2015	Rory Kinnear
No Time to Die	2021	Rory Kinnear

In The Man with the Golden Gun, Bill Tanner (Michael Goodliffe) is only seen briefly in the film and is not mentioned by name until the end credits. He appears in M (Bernard Lee)'s office with M and Colthorpe (James Cossins), discussing Francisco Scaramanga (Christopher Lee), who has sent a bullet to MI6 printed with Bond (Roger Moore)'s ID number. He explains Scaramanga's fingerprints on the bullet were verified by the CIA, and that Scaramanga is attempting to provoke a battle with MI6. This leads to Bond being sent to find Scaramanga.

In For Your Eyes Only, Bill Tanner (now played by James Villiers due to Michael Goodliffe's death in 1976) is given a bigger role, as Bernard Lee, who played M, had died. Tanner is shown wearing an Old Wykehamist tie. He gives Bond his assignment (along with Geoffrey Keen's character Sir Frederick Gray), which sends him to find Hector Gonzales (Stefan Kalipha). Bond is unable to get information from Gonzales later on because Melina Havelock (Carole Bouquet) kills him after Bond is captured. Tanner then gets upset at Bond for not getting any information and letting Melina murder Gonzales. Tanner is last seen at the end of the film, when he connects the Prime Minister Margaret Thatcher (Janet Brown) and Bond by phone. Unknown to Tanner and the Prime Minister, Bond is not there and it is merely a talking parrot that ends up "flirting" with the Prime Minister. In Octopussy, the role of M was recast with Robert Brown, so Tanner did not appear.

In GoldenEye, Tanner (Michael Kitchen) is only briefly seen in the Situation Room when the GoldenEye weapon is set off. Tanner calls the new M (Judi Dench) "the Evil Queen of Numbers", unaware that she is right behind him. As Michael Kitchen was unable to reprise his role for Tomorrow Never Dies, the character of Charles Robinson (Colin Salmon) was created in his stead.

In The World Is Not Enough, Tanner is seen at the Scotland MI6 building debriefing the agents on the murder of Sir Robert King (David Calder), father of Elektra King (Sophie Marceau). When Bond comes to the conclusion that the terrorist Renard (Robert Carlyle) is behind the murder, Tanner is seen talking about what Renard can do or is planning to do. He is only seen again twice, when Elektra, the true mastermind of her father's murder, contacts M to draw her in to be kidnapped, and finally at the end of the film as R (John Cleese) is attempting to find Bond.

Tanner had never been considered a regular cinematic character until 2008's Quantum of Solace where he was first played by Rory Kinnear who reprised the role of Tanner in Skyfall, Spectre, and No Time to Die. Kinnear also voices Tanner and provides his likeness for the 2010 remake of the GoldenEye game and the original games James Bond 007: Blood Stone and 007 Legends.
