= Jeremy Black (historian) =

English historian (born 1955)

Professor Jeremy Black MBE
- Born: 30 October 1955 (age 70); London, England
- Occupations: Historian, writer
- Years active: 1984–present
- Known for: 18th century British foreign policy, historiography, political history

Jeremy Black MBE (born 30 October 1955) is an English historian, who was formerly a professor of history at the University of Exeter. He is a senior fellow at the Center for the Study of America and the West at the Foreign Policy Research Institute in Philadelphia, Pennsylvania, US.

Black is the author of over 180 books, principally but not exclusively on 18th-century British politics and international relations, and was described in 2004 as "the most prolific historical scholar of our age". He has published on military and political history, including Warfare in the Western World, 1882–1975 (2001) and The World in the Twentieth Century (2002).

== Background ==
Black studied at Queens' College, Cambridge, St John's College, Oxford, and Merton College, Oxford, before joining Durham University as a lecturer in 1980, where he earned his PhD and subsequently a professorship in 1994. His doctoral thesis was entitled British Foreign Policy 1727–1731, and completed in 1983. As a staff candidate he was not attached to any of the Durham colleges.

He was editor of Archives, journal of the British Records Association, from 1989 to 2005. He has served on the Council of the British Records Association (1989–2005); the Council of the Royal Historical Society (1993–1996 and 1997–2000); and the Council of the List and Index Society (from 1997). He has sat on the editorial boards of History Today, International History Review, Journal of Military History, Media History and the Journal of the Royal United Service Institution (now the RUSI Journal).

== Awards and honours ==
- In 2008, he was awarded the Samuel Eliot Morison Prize for lifetime achievement as afforded by the Society for Military History.

== Works ==
=== Books ===
- A History of Britain's Transport (2025)
- A History of the Railroad in 100 Maps (2024)
- Rethinking Geopolitics (2024)
- Paris: A Short History (2024)
- A Brief History of History (2023)
- Geographies of War (2022)
- A Brief History of London (2022)
- A Brief History of the British Monarchy: From the Iron Age to King Charles III (2022)
- A Brief History of Germany (2022)
- A Brief History of the Atlantic (2022)
- A History of Britain in 100 Maps (2022)
- The French Revolutionary and Napoleonic Wars: Strategies for a World War (2022)
- The Game Is Afoot: The Enduring World of Sherlock Holmes (2022)
- The Importance of Being Poirot (2022)
- How the Army Made Britain a Global Power: 1688-1815 (2021)
- A Short History of War (2021)
- Strategy and the Second World War (2021)
- A Brief History of Britain 1851–2021: From World Power To ? (2021)
- England in the Age of Austen (2021)
- England in the Age of Dickens (2021)
- France: A Short History (2021)
- A History of the Second World War in 100 Maps (2020)
- Military Strategy: A Global History (2020)
- George III: Madness and Majesty (2020)
- Tank Warfare (2020)
- A Brief History of Portugal (2020)
- A Brief History of the Mediterranean (2020)
- History of the Twentieth Century (2020)
- A History of The World: From Prehistory to the 21st Century (2019)
- Introduction to Global Military History: 1750 to the Present Day (2019)
- England in the Age of Shakespeare (2019)
- Charting the Past. The Historical Worlds of Eighteenth-Century England (2019)
- A Brief History of Spain (2019)
- War and its Causes (2019)
- The English Press, a History (2019)
- The World at War 1914–45 (2019)
- History of Europe: From Prehistory to the 21st Century (2019)
- Imperial Legacies: The British Empire Around the World (2019)
- A Brief History of Italy: Indispensable for Travellers (2018)
- English Nationalism: A Short History (2018)
- Fortifications and Siegecraft: Defense and Attack through the Ages (2018)
- Mapping Naval Warfare: A Visual History of Conflict at Sea (2017)
- Naval Warfare: A Global History since 1860 (2017)
- Plotting Power: Strategy in the Eighteenth Century (2017)
- Geographies of an Imperial Power: The British World, 1688–1815 (2017)
- Combined Operations: A Global History of Amphibious and Airborne Warfare (2017)
- The World of James Bond: The Lives and Times of 007 (2017)
- A History of Britain 1945 to Brexit (2017)
- Maps of War: Mapping Conflict Through the Centuries (2016)
- Air Power (2016)
- The Holocaust: History and Memory (2016)
- Insurgency and Counterinsurgency (2016)
- (ed.) The Tory World: Deep History and the Tory Theme in British Foreign Policy, 1679–2014 (2015)
- The Cold War (2015)
- The City on the Hill: A Life of the University of Exeter (2015)
- Rethinking World War Two: The Conflict and its Legacy (2015)
- War in Europe (2015)
- The Atlantic Slave Trade in World History (2015)
- Metropolis: Mapping the City (2015)
- A Short History of Britain (2015)
- Other Pasts, Different Presents, Alternative Futures (2015)
- Clio's Battles: Historiography in Practice (2015)
- Geopolitics and the Quest for Dominance (2015)
- The British Empire (2015)
- A Century of Conflict (2014)
- Politics and Foreign Policy in the Age of George I, 1714–1727 (2014)
- British Politics and Foreign Policy, 1727–44 (2014)
- The Power of Knowledge: How Information and Technology Made the Modern World (2014)
- London: A History (2013)
- War in the Eighteenth Century World (2013)
- War and Technology (2013)
- Introduction to Global Military History: 1775 to the Present Day (2012)
- A History of the British Isles (3rd edn) (2012)
- Avoiding Armageddon: From the Great War to the Fall of France, 1918–40 (2012)
- War and the Cultural Turn (2012)
- Slavery (2011)
- Fighting for America (2011)
- Debating Foreign Policy in Eighteenth Century Britain (2011)
- The Great War and the Making of the Modern World (2011)
- Beyond the Military Revolution: War in the Seventeenth Century World (2011)
- War in the World 1450–1600 (2011)
- Crisis of Empire: Britain and America in the Eighteenth Century (2010)
- A History of Diplomacy (2010)
- Waterloo (2010)
- War: A Short History (2010)
- The War of 1812 in the Age of Napoleon. London, New York: Continuum International Publishing Group. 2010. ISBN 978-0-8264-3612-2.
- London: a history. Carnegie Publishing. 2009.
- Great Powers and the Quest for Hegemony: The World Order since 1500 (2008)
- What If?: Counterfactualism and the Problem of History. Social Affairs Unit. 2008.
- The Curse of History. Social Affairs Unit. 2008. ISBN 9781904863298.
- Eighteenth Century Britain, 1688–1783. Palgrave. 2008.
- George III: America's Last King. New Haven and London: Yale University Press. 2008. ISBN 978-0-300-13621-0.
- Parliament and Foreign Policy in the Eighteenth Century. CUP. 2004.
- The English Seaborne Empire. Yale. 2004.
- Kings, Nobles and Commoners: States and Societies in Early Modern Europe. I.B. Tauris. 2004.
- Rethinking Military History. Routledge. 2004.
- War Since 1945. 2004. e-book
- World War Two: A Military History. Routledge. 2003.
- Italy and the Grand Tour. Yale University Press. 2003.
- Italy and the Grand Tour. Palgrave. 2003.
- Visions of the World: A History of Maps. Mitchell Beazley. 2003.
- The British Abroad: The Grand Tour in the Eighteenth Century. Sutton. 2003.
- From Louis XIV to Napoleon: The Fate of a Great Power. Routledge. 1999.
- editor: War in the Modern World 1815–2000. Routledge. 2003.
- War: An Illustrated World History. Sutton. 2003.
- Georgian Devon. 2003.
- Warfare in the Eighteenth Century. Cassell. 2002.
- The World in the Twentieth Century. Longman. 2003.
- America as a Military Power 1775–1882. Greenwood. 2002.
- editor: European Warfare 1494–1660. Palgrave. 2002.
- European International Relations 1648–1815. Palgrave. 2002.
- Europe and the World 1650–1830. Routledge. 2002.
- with Donald MacRaild: Nineteenth-Century Britain. Palgrave. 2002.
- A History of the British Isles (2nd ed.). Palgrave. 2002.
- editor: European Warfare 1815–2000. Palgrave. 2002.
- War in the New Century. 2001.
- Warfare in the Western World 1882–1975. Indiana University Press/Acumen. 2001.
- War in the New Century. Continuum. 2001.
- Western Warfare 1775–1882. Indiana University Press. 2001.
- Walpole in Power: Britain's First Prime Minister. Sutton. 2001.
- The Politics of James Bond: from Fleming's Novels to the Big Screen. Greenwood. 2001.
- British Diplomats and Diplomacy 1688–1800. University of Exeter Press. 2001.
- The English Press 1621–1861. Sutton. 2001.
- Eighteenth-Century Britain 1688–1783. Palgrave. 2001.
- The Making of Modern Britain: The Age of Empire to the New Millennium. 2001.
- War, Past, Present and Future. 2000.
- A New History of Wales. 2000.
- Europe in the Eighteenth Century (2nd ed.). 2000 [1990].
- Modern British History since 1900 (2000)
- A New History of England (2000)
- Historical Atlas of Britain: The End of the Middle to the Georgian Era (2000)
- Britain as a Military Power, 1688–1815 (1999)
- Why Wars Happen (1998)
- War and the World, 1450–2000 (1998)
- Maps and History (1997)
- Maps and Politics (1997)
- America or Europe: British Foreign Policy, 1739–63 (1997)
- History of the British Isles (1996)
- Illustrated History of Eighteenth Century Britain (1996)
- Warfare Renaissance to Revolution, 1492–1792 (1996)
- British Foreign Policy in an Age of Revolution (1994)
- Convergence or Divergence? Britain and the Continent (1994)
- European Warfare, 1660–1815 (1994)
- The Politics of Britain, 1688–1800 (1993)
- History of England (1993)
- The British Abroad: The Grand Tour in the Eighteenth Century. 1992.
- Pitt the Elder (1992)
- A System of Ambition? British Foreign Policy, 1660–1793 (1991)
- A Military Revolution? Military Change and European Society 1550–1800. Basingstoke: Macmillan Education. 1991. ISBN 0-333-51906-X.
- War for America: The Fight for Independence 1775–1783 (1991)
- Sir Robert Walpole and the Nature of Politics in Early Eighteenth Century Britain (1990)
- Culloden and the '45 (1990)
- The Rise of the European Powers 1679–1793 (1990)
- The English Press in the Eighteenth Century (1987)
- The Collapse of the Anglo-French Alliance 1727–31 (1987)
- Natural and Necessary Enemies: Anglo-French Relations in the Eighteenth Century (1986)
- The British and the Grand Tour (1985)
- British Foreign Policy in the Age of Walpole (1985)

=== Articles ===
- Black, Jeremy (Autumn 1996). "Could the British have won the American War of Independence?". Journal of the Society for Army Historical Research. 74 (299): 145–154. (See also a 2006 talk at Ohio State University about this.)
