= Out of the Hitler Time =

Semi-autobiographical novel trilogy by Judith Kerr

- Cover of the E-book trilogy set incorporating the adult covers of the separate books
- Trilogy edition (ISBN 0007137605); When Hitler Stole Pink Rabbit (978-0142414088); Bombs on Aunt Dainty (978-0007375714); A Small Person Far Away (978-0007137626)
- Author: Judith Kerr
- Country: United Kingdom
- Language: English
- Genre: Children's novels
- Publisher: HarperCollins
- Published: 1971–1978
- Media type: Print
- No. of books: 3
- OCLC: 51082577

Out of the Hitler Time is a trilogy of semi-autobiographical novels by Judith Kerr for children and young adults.

== When Hitler Stole Pink Rabbit ==
First edition cover

When Hitler Stole Pink Rabbit is the first book in the trilogy and a well-known novel for children.

It is based upon the early life of the author whose Jewish father, noted drama critic, journalist and screenwriter Alfred Kerr, was wanted by the Nazis. Kerr's family fled their home in Berlin via Switzerland to escape to Paris and then England. She came to write the book when her own son was eight; after seeing The Sound of Music he remarked, "Now we know what it was like when Mummy was a little girl". Kerr wanted him to know what it was really like and so wrote When Hitler Stole Pink Rabbit. The book gives a distinctive child's perspective on the rise of Nazism in 1930s Germany and the experience of being a refugee, reflecting Kerr's positive feelings about her own experience:

My parents were wonderful. My brother Michael and I knew there wasn't much money but it didn't seem to matter much. They made us feel it was an adventure. I much preferred it to the sort of childhood I would have had had we had a so-called normal childhood. When we were in Paris we had this grotty, tiny flat and were looking out over Paris and I said to my father, 'Isn't it wonderful being a refugee!'

The story starts in Berlin, in March 1933, when nine-year-old Anna, the main character in the trilogy, finds out one morning that her father is missing. She and her brother, Max, discover that Papa thinks that Adolf Hitler might win the elections, and has fled to Prague. Because the family is of Jewish heritage, and Papa is also a well-known critic of the Nazis, this is important. If Hitler wins the elections, Mama, Max and Anna will join Papa in Switzerland. If Hitler loses, then Papa will come back home to Berlin. However the parents decide not to wait until after the elections and Mama and the children rushed into Switzerland in alarming secrecy. It is at this time that Anna has to choose which toy she wishes to take with her. She opts to take her new woolly dog, and leave behind her pink rabbit toy, believing she will return to Berlin after a short time. It is from this that the title is derived as she considers that Hitler and the Nazis have "stolen" her toy. In Switzerland, they settle in a gasthof on the shore of Lake Zurich, and the family stay there for six months. Soon, however, Papa thinks that they should move to Paris, and goes there to find out about accommodation. He comes back and wants Mama to come back with him as a prospective buyer. So Max and Anna are left on their own for a little while.

The Nazis find out about Papa as he travels, and a price of one thousand marks is put on his head. This really scares Anna and she is afraid that it means that Papa will be put in a room with one thousand coins being dropped onto his head, suffocating him. She goes on believing this until Max tells her what it really means. When Papa soon comes back to collect them (Mama stays in Paris to settle into the apartment they have rented), a porter directed them to the wrong train, one that will send them back to Germany, where Papa would have been imprisoned by the Nazis. Fortunately, though, Anna notices the destination label just in time, and they manage to get their luggage back and onto the correct train to Paris. There, Max attends a boys' school, and it takes a long time but Mama finally finds an elementary school for Anna. Anna finds French hard for a little while, but one day it clicks and she finds herself able to speak it fluently. In 1936, after two years in Paris, the family decides to move again, this time to London, as Papa thinks the BBC might buy a biographical film script on Napoleon's mother, inspired by a talk he had with the children. The story ends as Mama, Papa, Max and Anna get off the train in England, to be greeted by Mama's cousin, Otto.

== Bombs on Aunt Dainty ==
Bombs on Aunt Dainty, which was originally published as The Other Way Round in 1975, is about Anna and her family's life in London during World War II.

Anna lives with the fear of bombs while Max is away studying at Cambridge University. The final scenes take place on VE Day.

== A Small Person Far Away ==
A Small Person Far Away is the third part in the trilogy, published in 1978.

The book is set in 1956, coinciding with the Hungarian Revolution. Anna lives in Kensington with her husband Richard, a scriptwriter for the BBC, but must return to West Berlin where her mother lives amidst the Cold War. Towards the end of the book Anna becomes pregnant.

== Awards and legacy ==
When Hitler Stole Pink Rabbit won the 1974 Deutscher Jugendliteraturpreis. It is often used in German and British schools as an introduction to the period in history and the experience of being a refugee. The book has been used as part of the Judith Kerr collection at the Seven Stories Centre for Children's Books, in Newcastle. It is an American Library Association Notable Book, a School Library Journal Best Book of the Year and a Horn Book Fanfare Title.

== Film adaptations ==
When Hitler Stole Pink Rabbit was adapted by the German TV channel WDR as the television film Als Hitler das rosa Kaninchen stahl, directed by Ilse Hofmann, starring Martin Benrath and Elisabeth Trissenaar.

A cinematic adaptation of When Hitler Stole Pink Rabbit premiered in December 2019 in Germany, directed by Oscar-winning director Caroline Link. Carla Juri and Oliver Masucci portray the parents.

== Stage adaptations ==
In May 2021, it was announced that a stage musical adaptation of When Hitler Stole Pink Rabbit is in development at The Old Vic, London, with a book and lyrics by Caroline Bird and music and lyrics by Miranda Cooper and Nick Coler. Further information is to be confirmed.
