= Bryan Kneale =

Manx artist and sculptor (1930–2025)

Bryan Kneale MBE RA
- Kneale in 2025
- Born: Robert Bryan Charles Kneale; 19 June 1930; Douglas, Isle of Man
- Died: 19 September 2025 (aged 95)
- Education: Douglas School of Art; Royal Academy schools
- Relatives: Nigel Kneale (brother); Matthew Kneale (nephew); Tacy Kneale (niece); Judith Kerr (sister-in-law)
- Elected: Royal Academy of Arts (1970–2025)

Robert Bryan Charles Kneale MBE RA (19 June 1930 – 19 September 2025) was a Manx artist and sculptor, described by BBC News Online as "one of the Isle of Man's best known artists."

== Life and career ==
Born in the island's capital, Douglas, on 19 June 1930, Kneale studied painting at the Douglas School of Art, from which he graduated in 1947, and then moved to London, to study at the Royal Academy Schools. In 1948, he won the Rome Prize and spent some time living in Italy. During the 1950s, he learned welding, and in 1960 took to sculpture in preference to painting and became a teacher.

Kneale taught at Hornsey College of Art and Design, and from 1963 until his retirement from teaching in 1995 he taught sculpture at the Royal College of Art. He was also Master and later Professor of Sculpture at the Royal Academy between 1982 and 1990. In addition to his teaching, numerous exhibitions of his own painting and sculpture work have been held since 1953, and his works are displayed in countries such as Australia, Brazil, England, New Zealand and the United States. In the U.S., the Museum of Modern Art in New York City includes examples of his work amongst its public collections and in England his work is displayed at Manchester Art Gallery.

He was awarded a Leverhulme Trust Prize in 1952, as well as the Daily Express Young Painters' Prize (1955) and an Arts Council Purchase Award (1969). After a successful solo show at the Whitechapel Gallery in 1966, Kneale became the first abstract sculptor to be elected a Royal Academician in 1974. He accepted the honour only on the condition that he be allowed to curate a show of contemporary sculpture which resulted in a groundbreaking survey of some of the period's most exciting sculptors.

Kneale was the younger brother of the screenwriter Nigel Kneale (1922–2006), best known for his Quatermass television serials. Kneale illustrated the covers for Penguin Books' releases of his elder brother's Quatermass scripts in 1960. He was also responsible for a painting of a lobster from which BBC special effects designers Bernard Wilkie and Jack Kine drew their inspiration for the Martian creatures they constructed for Quatermass and the Pit (1958–59).

For his sculpture Capt Quilliam, he received the 2007 Marsh Award for Excellence in Public Sculpture. He was appointed a Member of the Order of the British Empire (MBE) in the 2019 New Year Honours, for services to British Art.

Kneale died on 19 September 2025, at the age of 95.
