= Alfred Kerr =

German theatre critic and essayist

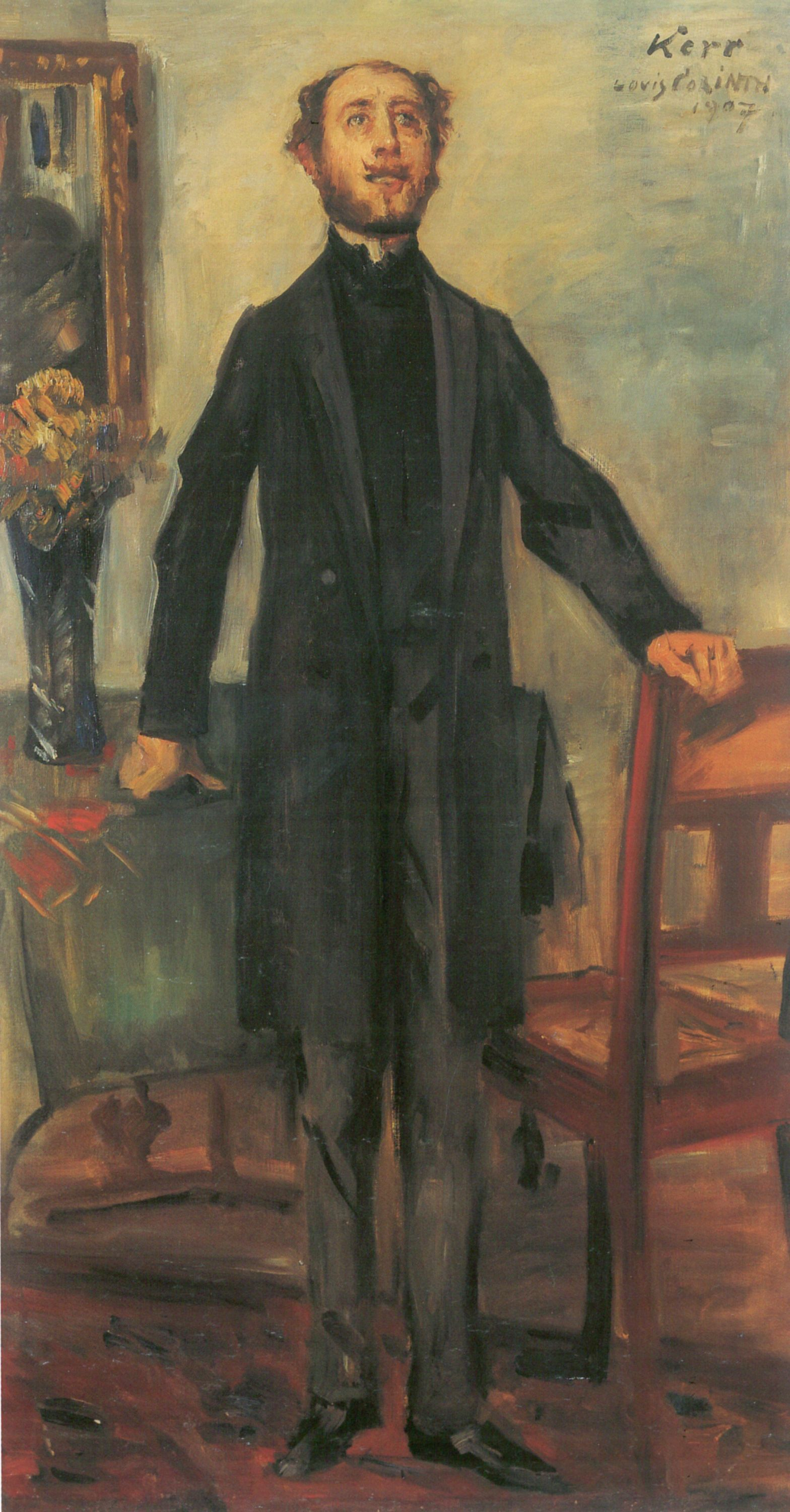
- Alfred Kerr Lovis Corinth (1907)
- Born: Alfred Kempner; 25 December 1867; Breslau, Silesia, Prussia (now Wrocław, Poland)
- Died: 12 October 1948 (aged 80); Hamburg, Germany
- Occupations: Author and theatre critic
- Spouses: Ingeborg Thormählen (m. 1917; died 1918) Julia Weismann (m. 1920)
- Children: Michael Kerr; Judith Kerr
- Relatives: Matthew Kneale (grandson)

Alfred Kerr (né Kempner; 25 December 1867 – 12 October 1948, surname: German pronunciation: [kɛʁ]) was an influential German theatre critic and essayist of Jewish descent, nicknamed the Kulturpapst ("Culture Pope").

== Biography ==
=== Youth ===
Kerr was born in Breslau, Silesia, into a Jewish family, the son of Helene (Calé) and wine trader Meyer Emanuel Kempner. His sister Annchen married Siegfried Ollendorf and ultimately left Germany for Palestine. Alfred said while still at school that he intended to shorten his name to Kerr, which became official in 1909. He studied literature in Berlin with Erich Schmidt and completed his Ph.D. at the University of Halle. Alfred Kerr worked as a theatre critic for Der Tag and later for Berliner Tageblatt, and Frankfurter Zeitung. He wrote weekly Berliner Briefe for the Breslauer Zeitung from 1895–1900 and for the Königsberger Allgemeine Zeitung from 1897 to 1922. With the publisher Paul Cassirer and the Arts Critic Julius Meier-Graefe he founded the artistic review Pan in 1910.

=== Career ===
Kerr changed his surname to avoid association with Friederike Kempner. Kerr was noted for his treatment of drama criticism as another branch of literary criticism. As his fame grew he engaged in polemics, with the critics Maximilian Harden, Herbert Ihering and Karl Kraus in particular. In the 1920s he was hostile to Bertolt Brecht, and assailed him with accusations of plagiarism.

=== Exile ===
In 1933 Kerr fled to Prague. His wife Julia and their children followed him to Switzerland later. They then went to Paris and then, after the purchase of a film script by Alexander Korda, to England. (These years of exile are described, from a child's perspective, by Kerr's daughter, author Judith Kerr, in her Out of the Hitler Time trilogy.) His books were amongst those burnt in May 1933 by the Nazis when they came to power; Kerr had attacked the Nazi Party publicly very early on and Joseph Goebbels said before Adolf Hitler came to power that Kerr would be one of the first he would shoot. He lived in extreme poverty in London. He was a founder of the Freier Deutscher Kulturbund, and worked for the German PEN club. An old feud with Karl Kraus worked against him at the BBC.

Kerr became naturalised as a British subject in 1947. In 1948 he visited Hamburg at the start of a planned tour of several German cities but suffered a stroke, and then decided to end his own life via an overdose of Veronal, procured for him by his wife. He was buried, without references to religion according to his wishes, in Ohlsdorf Cemetery in the position "Z 21-217" and his wife was cremated with her ashes buried at the foot of his grave when she died in 1965.

The Alfred-Kerr-Preis für Literaturkritik was established in 1977. His Berliner Briefe for the Breslauer Zeitung were published as Wo liegt Berlin in 1997, Warum fliesst der Rhein nicht durch Berlin and as Was ist der Mensch in Berlin in 2017. Wo liegt Berlin was a best-seller and the proceeds were given by Michael and Judith Kerr to the Kerr Foundation in Berlin which awards an annual Kerr Prize for a young actor. An eight volume edition of his works has been published by S. Fischer, there is an extensive literature devoted to Kerr.

== Family ==
Alfred Kerr married for the first time when he was over 50, to the much younger Ingeborg Thormählen. She died shortly afterwards in the 1918 flu pandemic while pregnant; the bereavement affected him deeply. His second marriage was to musician Julia Weismann (1898–1965) in 1920. Julia was the daughter of a Prussian Secretary of State, Robert Weismann. The Kerrs' son Michael Kerr became a prominent British lawyer. Their daughter Judith Kerr wrote a three-volume autobiography and the children's books The Tiger Who Came To Tea and the Mog series; the writer Matthew Kneale is her son with Nigel Kneale, the author of Quatermass scripts.

== Works ==
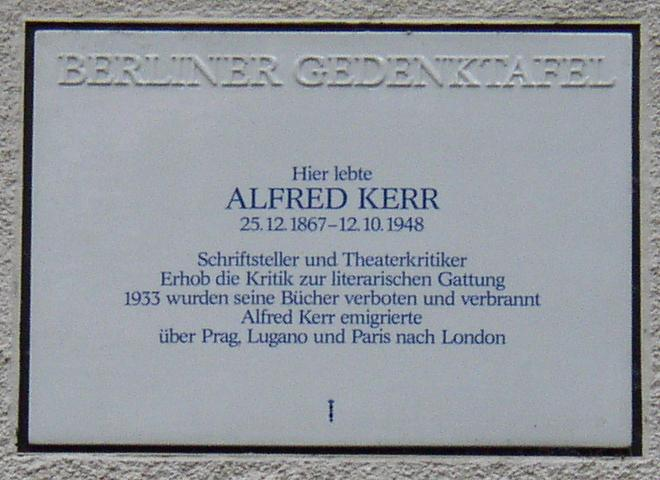
Memorial plaque in Berlin-Grunewald

- Godwi. Ein Kapitel deutscher Romantik (1898). Dissertation on Clemens Brentano. OCLC 718760185
- Das neue Drama (1905) OCLC 256849560
- Die Harfe (1917) poems OCLC 486101117
- Ich sage, was zu sagen ist: Theaterkritiken 1893–1919. Werke Band VII, 1.
- New York und London, travel OCLC 35889870
- O Spanien!, travel OCLC 974065526
- Caprichos (1926) poems OCLC 217501822
- Buch der Freundschaft (1928) children's literature OCLC 72096782
- So liegt der Fall Theaterkritiken 1919 – 1933 und im Exil
- Der Dichter und die Meerschweinchen: Clemens Tecks letztes Experiment
- Diktatur des Hausknechts
- Walther Rathenau. Erinnerungen eines Freundes OCLC 72136777
- Gruss an Tiere (1955) with Gerhard F. Hering OCLC 252261291
- Theaterkritiken (1971) selected criticism
- Ich kam nach England (1979) diary
- Mit Schleuder und Harfe (1982)
- Wo liegt Berlin? Briefe aus der Reichshauptstadt (1997) ISBN 978-3-8412-1350-1
- Warum fließt der Rhein nicht durch Berlin? Briefe eines europäischen Flaneurs. 1895 bis 1900 (1999)
- Alfred Kerr, Lesebuch zu Leben und Werk (1999)
- Mein Berlin (2002)
- Sucher und Selige. Literarische Ermittungen Werke Band IV, (2009)
- Das war meine Zeit Band V/VI (2013)
- Was ist der Mensch in Berlin Aufbau-Verlag (2017)
- Berlin wird Berlin Vier Bände Wallstein-Verlag (2021)
- New York and London, Berlinica Publishing, translated into English by Alan Bance, ISBN 978-3-96026-076-9
