= Julia Kerr =

German composer

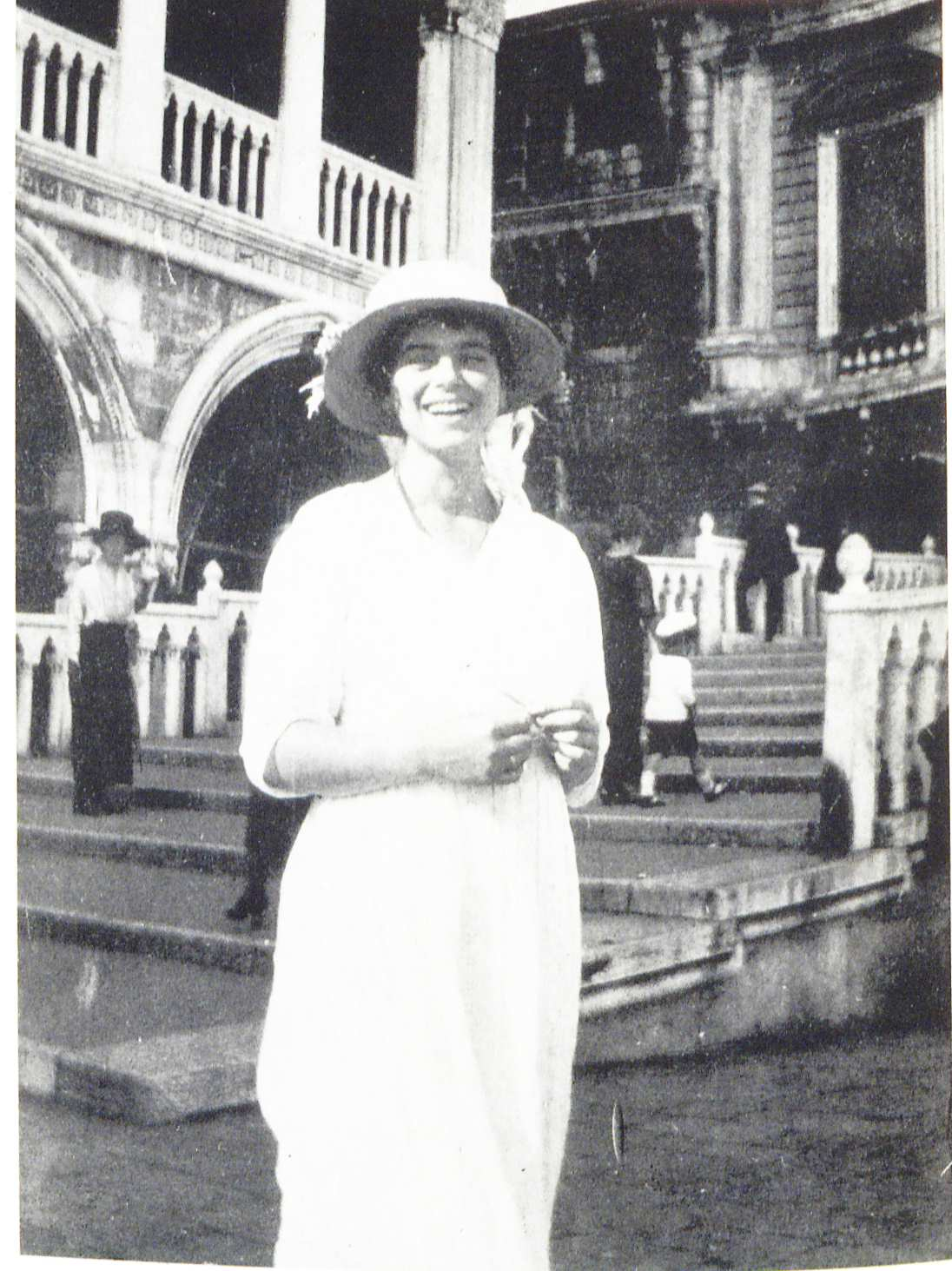
- Born: 28 August 1898; Wiesbaden, German Empire
- Died: 3 October 1965 (aged 67); Berlin, Germany
- Other name: Julia Kerwey
- Spouse: Alfred Kerr (m. 1920; died 1948)
- Children: Michael Kerr; Judith Kerr
- Relatives: Matthew Kneale (grandson)

Julia Kerr (née Weismann, 28 August 1898 – 3 October 1965) was a German composer and pianist. As a composer she used the name Julia Kerwey. She also worked as a translator during the Nuremberg trials.

== Biography ==
Kerr was born in Wiesbaden on 28 August 1898 as Julia Anna Franziska Weismann to the Prussian prosecutor Robert Weismann and his wife Gertrud, née Reichenheim. Her brother was the violinist Dietrich "Diez" Weismann (1900–1982). She studied music with Wilhelm Klatte in Berlin. Kerr married theater critic Alfred Kerr in April 1920. They had two children, Michael and Judith Kerr. The family were Jewish and it became necessary to flee Germany in 1933. Initially they fled to Switzerland and then France before settling in England in 1935. In London, Kerr worked in secretarial jobs until the end of the war. Once the war was over she took roles as an interpreter and secretary for the Nuremberg war crimes trials. Kerr returned to live in Germany after the war and was living in Berlin when she suffered a heart attack and died at the age of 67 in 1965.

Kerr's first opera was Die schoene Lau after a fairy tale by Eduard Mörike, first performed in 1928. In 1929 Alfred started to write the libretto for her second opera Der Chronoplan which was delayed due to her emigration. Kerr also composed songs, often after poems by her husband.
