= Stanley and the Women =

1991 British television drama series

- Genre: Drama
- Based on: Stanley and the Women by Kingsley Amis
- Written by: Nigel Kneale
- Directed by: David Tucker
- Starring: John Thaw; Geraldine James; Sheila Gish; Penny Downie; Sian Thomas; David Lyon; Alun Armstrong; Samuel West; Donald Churchill; Michael Elphick
- Composer: Barrington Pheloung
- Country of origin: United Kingdom
- Original language: English
- No. of series: 1
- No. of episodes: 4

Production
- Executive producer: Ted Childs
- Producer: Chris Burt
- Running time: 60 minutes
- Production company: Central Independent Television

Original release
- Network: ITV
- Release: 28 November – 19 December 1991

Stanley and the Women is a British television drama miniseries starring John Thaw, Samuel West, Geraldine James, Sheila Gish, Penny Downie and Sian Thomas. This series was based on the 1984 novel of the same name by Kingsley Amis and adapted for the television by Nigel Kneale and directed by David Tucker. It was produced by Central Independent Television for the ITV network and originally aired in four parts from 28 November to 19 December 1991.

== Plot ==
Stanley Duke works in advertising. He was married to an actress, Nowell, and is now dating Susan, with whom he has a complicated relationship, particularly because of the interference of her mother, Lady D. His son, Steve, suffers a mental breakdown, and Stanley takes him to two psychiatrists. The first, Dr. Collings, is female and too liberated for Stanley; and the second, Dr. Nash, seems to be more interested in drinking than helping his son.

== Cast ==
- John Thaw as Stanley Duke
- Geraldine James as Dr. Trish Collings
- Sheila Gish as Nowell Hutchinson
- Penny Downie as Susan Duke
- Siân Thomas as Lindsey Lucas
- David Lyon as Dr. Cliff Wainwright
- Alun Armstrong as Rufus Hilton
- Samuel West as Stephen Duke
- Donald Churchill as Harry Coote
- Michael Elphick as Bert Hutchinson
- Dafydd Hywel as Taff Wyndham
- Michael Aldridge as Dr. Alfred Nash

== Production ==
=== Casting ===
This was Donald Churchill's last acting role before his death on 29 October 1991, before the end of filming the series.

== Episodes ==
No.	Title	Directed by	Written by	Original release date	UK viewers (millions)
1	"Episode 1"	David Tucker	Nigel Kneale	28 November 1991	N/A
2	"Episode 2"	David Tucker	Nigel Kneale	5 December 1991	N/A
3	"Episode 3"	David Tucker	Nigel Kneale	12 December 1991	N/A
4	"Episode 4"	David Tucker	Nigel Kneale	19 December 1991	N/A

== Reception ==
Sean Day-Lewis in The Sunday Telegraph praised the acting, but called the programme "an emasculated shadow of the Kingsley Amis original. The distinctiveness of the novel lies in the provocatively sexist and ageist narrative voice of Stanley, or Amis, himself. When this is removed, to protect the audience from misogyny, the comedy goes with it."

Lynne Truss, reviewing the first episode for The Times, likewise noted changes made to Amis's novel (the removal of antisemitism as a subplot and the general making of Stanley a less bigoted character) and saw no point to the series "if it pulls its punches in this manner".

== Home media ==
The series was subsequently released on VHS by Video Collection International on 3 February 1992, and a DVD was made available on 14 May 2007 by DD Home Entertainment in the UK.
