= Mog (Judith Kerr) =

Series of children's books

- Mog on the cover of the first book
- Created by: Judith Kerr
- Original work: Mog the Forgetful Cat (1970)
- Owners: Judith Kerr Films; Penguin Random House
- Years: 1970–present

Print publications
- Book(s): Mog the Forgetful Cat (1970); Mog's Christmas (1976); Mog and the Baby (1980); Mog in the Dark (1983); Mog and Me (1984); Mog's Family of Cats (1985); Mog's Amazing Birthday Caper (1986); Mog and Bunny (1987); Mog and Barnaby (also known as Look Out, Mog, 1990); Mog on Fox Night (1992); Mog in the Garden (1993); Mog's Kittens (1994); Mog and the Granny (1996); Mog and the Vee Ee Tee (1997); Mog's Bad Thing (2000); Goodbye, Mog (2001)

Films and television
- Film(s): Mog & Terry(2024)
- Short film(s): Mog's Christmas Calamity (2015); Mog's Christmas (2023)

Mog is a fictional cat character in a series of children's books written by Judith Kerr. Other regularly occurring characters include Mr and Mrs Thomas (Mog's owners) and their two children Nicky and Debbie. In each book Mog gets into a different conundrum with a new character or event. Unusually for a popular children's series, Mog dies in the final book, 2001's Goodbye, Mog.

Kerr based her illustrations of the house in which the family live on her own family home in Barnes, London, and the two children were named after the middle names of her own son and daughter, Matthew and Tacy. The family name "Thomas" is from the first name of her husband, Nigel Kneale, upon whom the appearance of Mr Thomas was based.

In 2019, 50 years since the publication of the first book, a new book was released titled Mog's Birthday in which a birthday party is thrown for Mog, to the cat's annoyance, but she comes to enjoy the celebration.

"Mog" is a short form of moggy, a word for a cat that is not a specific breed.

== Publications ==
Titles include (with year of first publication):

- Mog the Forgetful Cat (1970)
- Mog's Christmas (1976)
- Mog and the Baby (1980)
- Mog in the Dark (1983)
- Mog and Me (1984)
- Mog's Family of Cats (1985)
- Mog's Amazing Birthday Caper (1986)
- Mog and Bunny (1987)
- Mog and Barnaby (also known as Look Out, Mog, 1990)
- Mog on Fox Night (1992)
- Mog in the Garden (1993)
- Mog's Kittens (1994)
- Mog and the Granny (1996)
- Mog and the Vee Ee Tee (1997)
- Mog's Bad Thing (2000)
- Goodbye, Mog (2001)
- Mog's Christmas Calamity (2015)
- My First Mog Books (Mog’s Family, Mog’s Day, Mog Loves, Mog Plays) (2015)
- My First Mog 123 (2017)
- Mog's Birthday (2019)

Being Added

== Adaptations ==
A 2023 play version of Mog started in April at the Birmingham Rep.

In November 2015, the character was featured in a Christmas advert for Sainsbury's, titled Mog's Christmas Calamity. The advert features Mog accidentally starting a fire on Christmas Eve and causing substantial damage to the Thomas family's house; her climbing across a telephone dials 999, leading to the fire brigade's intervention. Mog is hailed a hero, and the townspeople rally to fix the Thomases' house and host a large Christmas party there. Kerr herself appeared in this advert as a neighbour of the Thomas family. A special plush Mog and book version of the story were sold exclusively through Sainsbury's, with all profits being donated to Save the Children's child literacy work.

On 23 May 2023, London-based animation studio Lupus Films and Channel 4 in partnership with American film studio Universal Pictures and HarperCollins (which Lupus Films previously adapted Judith Kerr's picture book The Tiger Who Came to Tea with HarperCollins) commissioned a television adaptation of the 1976 picture book Mog’s Christmas which premiered on Christmas Eve 2023 with Benedict Cumberbatch and Claire Foy starring.

Two years later in September 2025 following the success of the 2023 TV movie adaptation of Mog's Christmas, Lupus Films and Channel 4 commissioned a sequel to Mog's Christmas called Mog's Bad Thing which is an adaptation of the 2000 picture book. The TV movie sequel adaptation will have a theatrical UK premiere in 2026 before premiering on Channel 4 in that same year with Lupus Films appointed Serious Kids as the worldwide distributor for the sequel outside the UK.
