= The Tiger Who Came to Tea =

1968 children's book by Judith Kerr

- Front cover
- Author: Judith Kerr
- Language: English
- Genre: Children's story
- Published: 1968
- Publisher: William Collins, Sons
- Publication date: 1968
- Publication place: United Kingdom

The Tiger Who Came to Tea is a children's story written and illustrated by Judith Kerr, and published by William Collins, Sons in 1968. The book concerns a girl called Sophie, her mother, and an anthropomorphised tiger who invites himself to their afternoon tea and consumes all the food and drink they have.

The original artwork for the book is held by Seven Stories, a children's literature centre in the UK. The Tiger Who Came to Tea is one of the best selling children's books of all time. The book remains extremely popular more than 50 years after it was first published, and a theatrical adaptation of the story has been produced. A television adaptation of the book aired on the UK's Channel 4 on Christmas Eve 2019.

== Plot ==
A little girl named Sophie is having tea with her mother in their kitchen, when she hears the doorbell ring. Soon, Sophie and her mother are joined for tea by a tiger who eats all of the food on the table and drinks all the tea, before consuming all of the food and drink in the house, and even drinking the taps dry. After the tiger leaves, Sophie's father comes home from work and suggests that they all go out and have a lovely meal in a café. The following day, Sophie and her mother go out to buy some more food, including a big tin of tiger food. However, the tiger never returns (and is seen playing a trumpet with the word "Goodbye" coming out of the end of it).

== Inspiration ==
Kerr invented the story after visiting a zoo with her three-year-old daughter. She said her husband Nigel Kneale was away making a film and "it felt a bit lonely and we wished somebody would come. We'd been to the zoo so it seemed reasonable for a tiger to come. We both thought they were incredibly beautiful." She told the story many times before making it into a book. The book took a year to write and illustrate.

Former Children’s Laureate Michael Rosen has drawn parallels between the book and the author’s life. Kerr spent her early years in Berlin just before the start of the Third Reich and her father was on a death list because of his opposition to the Nazis. Her family fled Germany when she was nine years old in 1933 and most of their property was seized. Rosen claims the tiger could be based on her memory of the past threat: something that could have disrupted her life as a young child and taken everything the family owned. He said "Judith knows about dangerous people who come to your house and take people away. She was told as a young child that her father could be grabbed at any moment by either the Gestapo or the SS – he was in great danger. So I don't know whether Judith did it consciously or not – I wouldn't want to go there – but the point is he's a jokey tiger, but he is a tiger." Kerr, however, stated more than once that the tiger represents nothing more than a tiger, and had no relevance to her upbringing.

== Theatre adaptation ==
The book has been adapted for stage with music by David Wood. The original production featured the actors Devon Black, Alan Atkins and Abbey Norman.

== Television adaptation ==
In January 2019, it was announced that London-based animation studio Lupus Films and Channel 4 (which Lupus Films previously produced The Snowman & The Snowdog and We're Going on a Bear Hunt for the network) alongside publishing unit HarperCollins and American film studio Universal Pictures had commissioned an animated TV movie adaptation of the picture book that was set to premiere in December 2019 with Universal Pictures handling worldwide distribution to the animated adaptation of the picture book.

The television adaptation aired in the UK on Channel 4 on Christmas Eve 2019 and featured the voices of David Walliams as the narrator; David Oyelowo as the tiger; Clara Ross as Sophie; Maria Darling as the boy from the grocer's; Tamsin Greig as Sophie's mother; Benedict Cumberbatch as Sophie's father and Paul Whitehouse as the milkman. It was also released on DVD by Universal Pictures Home Entertainment on 2 February 2020. British singer songwriter Robbie Williams sang the theme song "Hey Tiger", which was also released as a promotional single.

== See also ==
- Mog, a series of children's books by the same author.
