= Michael Kerr (judge) =

British judge

The Right Honourable Sir Michael Kerr
- Born: Michael Robert Emanuel Kerr; 1 March 1921; Berlin, Weimar Republic
- Died: 14 April 2002 (aged 81); London, England
- Occupations: Judge; lawyer; RAF pilot; teacher
- Spouses: Julia Braddock (m. 1952; div. 1982) Diana Sneezum (m. 1983)
- Children: 5
- Parents: Alfred Kerr (father); Julia Weismann (mother)
- Relatives: Judith Kerr (sister); Matthew Kneale (nephew)
- Military career
- Allegiance: United Kingdom
- Branch: Royal Air Force
- Service years: 1941—1945
- Rank: Flight Lieutenant
- Conflicts: Second World War
- Awards: 1939-1945 Star Atlantic Star Defence Medal 1939-1945 War Medal

Sir Michael Robert Emanuel Kerr (1 March 1921 – 14 April 2002) was a German-born British jurist, author, lawyer and High Court of Justice judge. He had been told, he said, that he was England's first "foreign-born judge" in 800 years, but he was careful neither to confirm nor to refute that suggestion.

== Life and career ==
Michael Kerr was born in Berlin-Charlottenburg, Germany, the son of the composer-musician Julia Anna Franziska (née Weismann) and the drama critic Alfred Kerr. He was the brother of the author Judith Kerr. His family was Jewish.

Kerr and his family were forced to leave their homeland at the end of the Weimar Republic by the emergence of the Nazi Party. After 1933, the Kerr family lived in Switzerland, France and finally the United Kingdom, as noted in the work of Judith Kerr. His experience as an immigrant allowed him to perfect skills in not only German but also French and English.

Sponsored by a friend of his father, Kerr was educated at Aldenham School. That and his immigration experience may have created a wish to emulate and join the upper-middle class of his new homeland.

Kerr was beginning his studies at Clare College, Cambridge, when the Second World War began. During the war, Kerr was at first identified as an enemy alien and interned at temporary camps around the country before he was sent to the Central Promenade Camp in Douglas, Isle of Man. He was released on the intervention of the Home Secretary and later served as a pilot in the Royal Air Force; he reached the rank of flight lieutenant. During the war he flew with No. 612 Squadron RAF in Vickers Wellington bombers against U-boats in the North Sea.

After the war, he returned to Cambridge to study law and became a naturalised British subject in 1946. His career eventually led him to the High Court of Justice, where he believed that he was the first senior judge born an alien since the 12th century. Kerr chaired the Law Commission from 1978 to 1981 before he served on the Court of Appeal and finally on the London Court of International Arbitration.

Kerr married Julia Braddock in 1953 and they had three children: Candy, Jo and Tim born in 1954, 1956 and 1958. The couple separated in 1977, but since Julia did not agree to the divorce, he had to wait for the statutory five years. Tim was appointed to the High Court in 2015.

Kerr married Diana Sneezum on 29 January 1983 and they had two children: Lucy, born in 1984, and Alexander, born in 1987. They remained happily married until Kerr's death in 2002.

In his autobiography As Far As I Remember he tells about his family, also reflected in books by his sister such as When Hitler Stole Pink Rabbit, and about his career in the British law system. His short analytic writing is reminiscent of his father's style.

== Publications ==
- Kerr, M., Concord and Conflict in International Arbitration, Arbitration International, Volume 13, Issue 2, 1 June 1997: the first in a series of lectures given in memory of the construction lawyer Donald Keating.
- As Far As I Remember. Hart Publishing, Oxford and Portland/Oregon 2002, ISBN 1-901362-87-6

== Arms ==
Coat of arms of Michael Kerr
Motto Cum Grano Salis
