= Gasthaus =

German-style inn or tavern

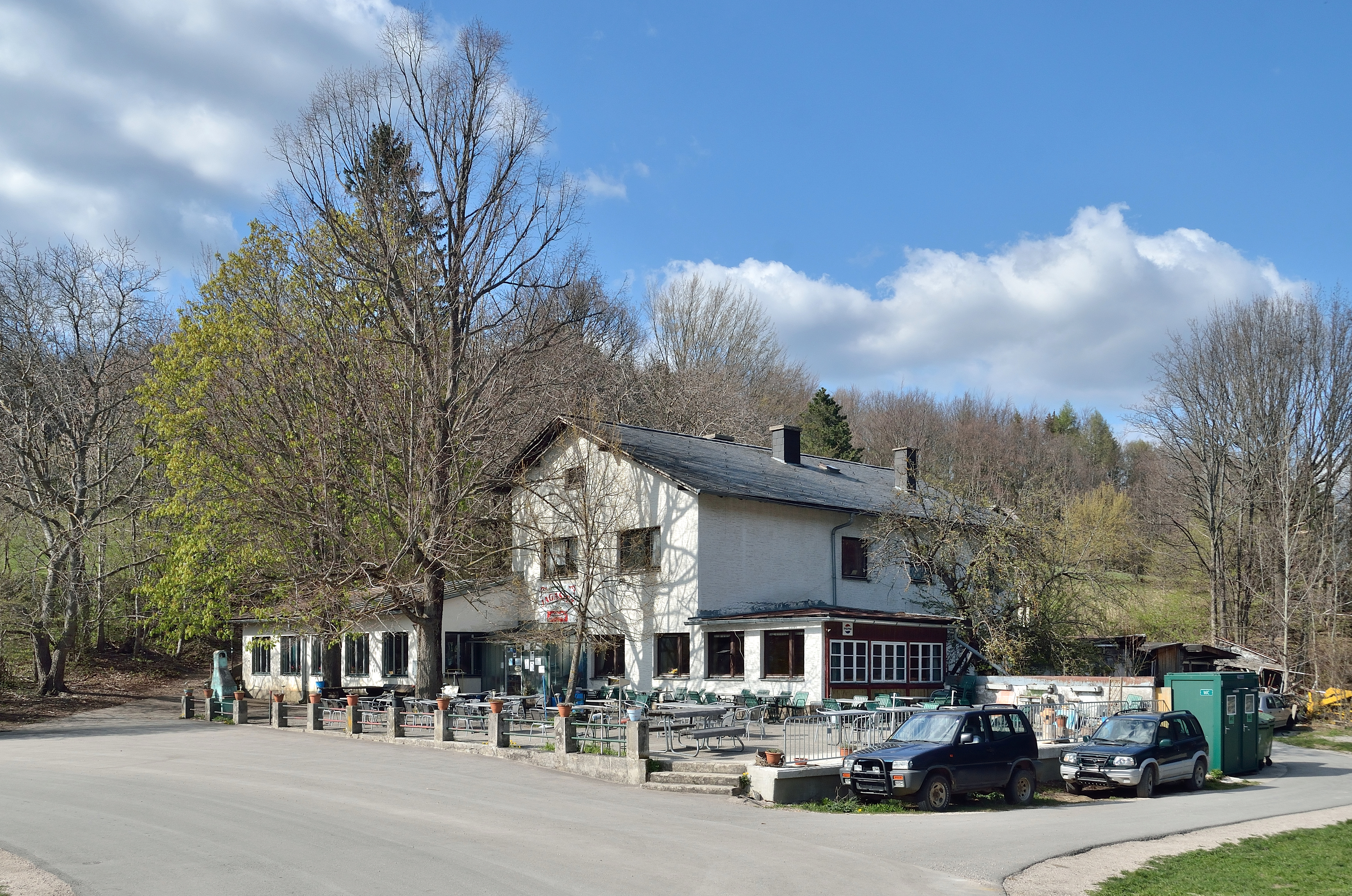
A Gasthaus in Muggendorf, Austria

A Gasthaus (also called Gasthof, Landhaus, or Pension) is a German-style inn or tavern with a bar, a restaurant, banquet facilities and hotel rooms for rent.

Gasthäuser are typically found in smaller towns and are often family-owned. It is common for three generations of a family to work together in such an establishment, and many have been owned by the same family for generations.

Gasthäuser are common in Germany, Austria, Switzerland, and other countries in Europe around Germany. Some are decorated with mural paintings (called Lüftlmalerei) depicting fairy tale stories or local legendary figures.

== Etymology ==
Specifically translated a Gasthaus means "guest house" in German. Gasthof is a variation of the word, Landhaus means "country house" (though is essentially the same concept, just in a rural setting) and Pension means "boarding house" or small hotel. Lunch and dinner (Mittagessen und Abendessen) are usually served to the public, but breakfast (Frühstück) is typically reserved for overnight guests. It also will often have an outdoor area for a beer garden (Biergarten) during the spring and summer seasons.
