= Judith Kerr =

British writer and illustrator (1923–2019)

Judith Kerr OBE
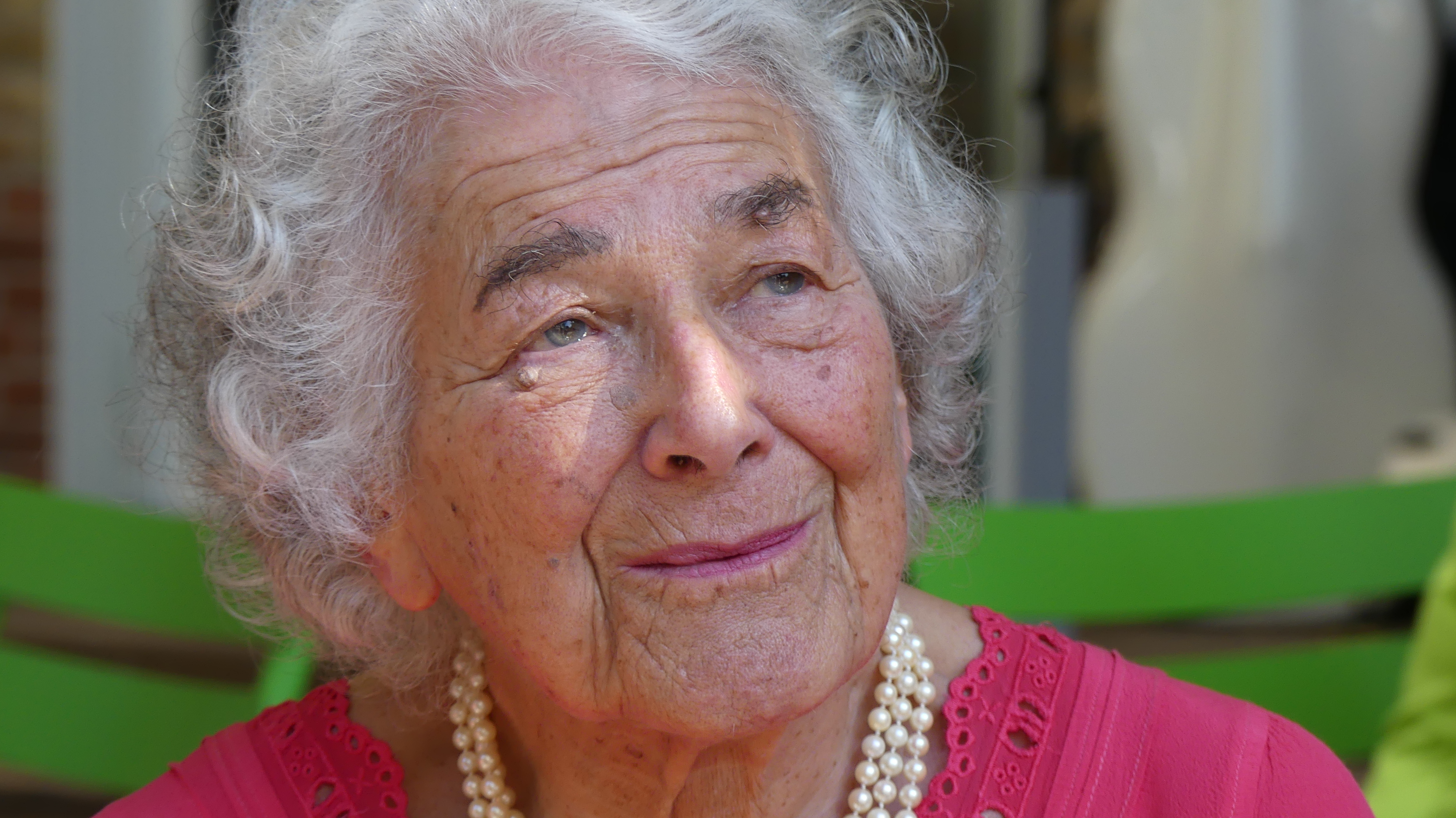
- Kerr at the 2016; Berlin International Literature Festival
- Born: Anna Judith Gertrud Helene Kerr; 14 June 1923; Berlin, Germany
- Died: 22 May 2019 (aged 95); Barnes, London, England
- Citizenship: German (1923–1941); Stateless (1941–1947); British (1947–2019); 11 June 1947, date of naturalisation
- Occupations: Writer and illustrator
- Spouse: Nigel Kneale (m. 1954; died 2006)
- Children: 2, including Matthew Kneale
- Parents: Alfred Kerr (father); Julia Weismann (mother)
- Relatives: Michael Kerr (brother)
- Writing career
- Genre: Children's literature
- Notable works: The Tiger Who Came to Tea, the Mog series, When Hitler Stole Pink Rabbit
- Judith Kerr's voice Recorded December 2008 from the BBC Radio 4 programme Woman's Hour

Anna Judith Gertrud Helene Kerr OBE (surname pronounced /ˈkɑːr/ KAR German pronunciation: [kɛʁ]; 14 June 1923 – 22 May 2019) was a German-born British writer and illustrator whose books sold more than 10 million copies around the world. She created both enduring picture books such as the Mog series and The Tiger Who Came to Tea and acclaimed novels for older children such as the semi-autobiographical When Hitler Stole Pink Rabbit, which gave a child's-eye view of escaping Hitler's persecution in the Second World War. Born in the Weimar Republic, she came to Britain with her family in 1935 to escape persecution during the rise of the Nazis.

== Early life ==
Kerr was born on 14 June 1923 in Berlin, the daughter of Alfred Kerr (1867–1948), a theatre critic, and Julia Kerr (née Weismann; 1898–1965), a composer who was the daughter of a Prussian politician. Kerr had a brother, Michael. Her parents were both from German Jewish families.

Early in March 1933, the family heard a rumour that, should the Nazis come to power in the forthcoming election, they planned to confiscate their passports and arrest Alfred Kerr for having openly criticised the party. The family fled Germany for Switzerland on the morning of the election and later learned that the Nazis had come to their home in Berlin the following morning to arrest them. Alfred Kerr's books were burned by the Nazis shortly after he had fled Germany. The family later travelled to France, before finally settling in Britain in 1936, where Judith Kerr lived for the remainder of her life.

== Life in London ==
During the Second World War, Kerr worked for the Red Cross, helping wounded soldiers, before being awarded a scholarship to study at the Central School of Art and Design and becoming an artist. She met her future husband, screenwriter Nigel "Tom" Kneale, in the BBC canteen. He wrote the cult TV science-fiction serial The Quatermass Experiment for which Kerr helped make and operate the special effects. Kneale later prompted her to apply for a job as a BBC television scriptwriter. Kerr naturalised as a British subject on 21 June 1947.

Kerr and Kneale were married in 1954; they remained married until his death in 2006. They had two children, a daughter Tacy (born 1958) and a son Matthew (born 1960). Matthew is also a writer, winning the Book of the Year prize at the Whitbread Book Awards in 2000 for the novel English Passengers. Tacy is an actress, animatronics artist and painter; as an animatronics designer, she initially worked for Jim Henson's Creature Shop before working independently in special effects. She has worked on films including Lost in Space, Dog Soldiers, and the first four Harry Potter films. As an artist, she primarily paints insects.

Kerr lived in the same house in Barnes, London, from 1962 until her death on 22 May 2019, aged 95.

== Books ==
Kerr is best known for her children's books. Although she dreamed of being a famous writer as a child, she only started writing and drawing books when her own children were learning to read. She wrote self-illustrated picture titles, such as the 17-book Mog series and The Tiger Who Came to Tea. The character of Mog was based on a real-life tabby who would sit on Kerr's lap as she worked.

As well as young children's books, Kerr wrote children's novels such as the semi-autobiographical Out of the Hitler Time trilogy (When Hitler Stole Pink Rabbit, Bombs on Aunt Dainty (originally published as The Other Way Round) and A Small Person Far Away), which tell the story, from a child's perspective, of the rise of the Nazis in 1930s Germany and life as a refugee, life in Britain during World War II and life during the post-war years and the Cold War respectively. Again it was her children who occasioned this writing: when her son was eight he saw The Sound of Music and remarked, "now we know what it was like when Mummy was a little girl". Kerr wanted him to know what it was really like and so wrote When Hitler Stole Pink Rabbit. The story was based on her regret over choosing to take a stuffed dog toy with her when her family fled Germany rather than a beloved pink rabbit toy. The young adult novel won the Deutscher Jugendliteraturpreis in 1974. A cinematic adaption of When Hitler Stole Pink Rabbit premiered in December 2019 in Germany, directed by Oscar-winning director Caroline Link.

Kerr said that since the death of her husband writing had become more important than ever. She continued to write and illustrate children's books: Twinkles, Arthur and Puss was published in 2008, and One Night in the Zoo in 2009. The Curse of the School Rabbit was published posthumously in 2019.

Kerr was appointed Officer of the Order of the British Empire (OBE) in the 2012 Birthday Honours for services to children's literature and Holocaust education.

== Death and legacy ==
Kerr died at her home on 22 May 2019, aged 95, following a short illness.

In 2013, Britain's first bilingual state school in English and German, the Judith Kerr Primary School in Herne Hill, south London, was named after her.

In May 2019, a week before her death, she was nominated as an illustrator of the year at the British Book Awards. An archive of her illustrations is held at the Seven Stories centre in Newcastle upon Tyne.

== Selected works ==
- The Tiger Who Came to Tea (HarperCollins, 1968).
- The Mog series, including:
  - Mog the Forgetful Cat (1970)
  - Mog's Christmas (1976)
  - Goodbye, Mog (2002)
  - Mog's Christmas Calamity (2015)
- The "Out of the Hitler Time" trilogy:
  - When Hitler Stole Pink Rabbit (1971)
  - Bombs on Aunt Dainty (originally published as The Other Way Round) (1975)
  - A Small Person Far Away (1978)
