= Timothy Kerr =

English judge

The Honourable Mr Justice Kerr
- Royal coat of arms of the United Kingdom

High Court Judge King's Bench Division
- Incumbent
- Assumed office 2015

Personal details
- Born: 15 February 1958 (age 68)
- Parent: Michael Kerr (father)
- Education: Magdalen College, Oxford

Sir Timothy Julian Kerr (born 15 February 1958), styled The Hon. Mr Justice Kerr, is a judge of the High Court of England and Wales.

The son of Sir Michael Kerr, a German-born lord justice of appeal, Kerr was educated at Westminster School and Magdalen College, Oxford. He was called to the Bar at Gray’s Inn in 1983, becoming a Bencher in 2015. He was appointed Queen's Counsel in 2001, and a Recorder from 2008. He sat as part time chairman of employment tribunals from 2001 to 2006. He also sat on various sports tribunals.

Kerr was appointed a Justice of the High Court (Queen's Bench Division) on 4 June 2015, on the retirement of Mr Justice Eder. He received the customary knighthood in November of that year.
