= When Hitler Stole Pink Rabbit (film) =

2019 film

- Directed by: Caroline Link
- Written by: Anna Brüggemann; Caroline Link
- Based on: When Hitler Stole Pink Rabbit by Judith Kerr
- Produced by: Clementina Hegewisch; Jochen Laube; Fabian Maubach
- Starring: Riva Krymalowski; Marinus Hohmann; Carla Juri; Oliver Masucci
- Cinematography: Bella Halben
- Edited by: Patricia Rommel
- Music by: Volker Bertelmann
- Production companies: Sommerhaus Filmproduktion; Warner Bros. Film Productions Germany; La Siala Entertainment; Hugofilm Features; Mia Film
- Distributed by: Warner Bros. Pictures
- Release date: 25 December 2019 (Germany)
- Running time: 119 minutes
- Countries: Germany; Switzerland
- Language: German

When Hitler Stole Pink Rabbit (German: Als Hitler das rosa Kaninchen stahl) is a 2019 German drama film directed by Caroline Link. It is based on the semi-autobiographical novel by Judith Kerr.

== Cast ==
- Riva Krymalowski as Anna Kemper
- Marinus Hohmann as Max Kemper
- Carla Juri as Dorothea Kemper
- Oliver Masucci as Arthur Kemper
- Justus von Dohnányi as Onkel Julius
- Ursula Werner as Heimpi
