= English Passengers =

2000 historical novel by Matthew Kneale

- First edition (publ. Hamish Hamilton)
- Author: Matthew Kneale
- Publisher: Hamish Hamilton
- Publication date: March 14, 2000
- Awards: Whitbread Book Award (2000)
- ISBN: 978-0-241-14068-0

English Passengers (ISBN 0-385-49744-X) is a 2000 historical novel written by Matthew Kneale, which won that year's Whitbread Book Award and was shortlisted for the Booker Prize and the Miles Franklin Award. It is narrated by 20 different characters and tells the story of a voyage to look for the Garden of Eden in Tasmania and the decimation of that island’s indigenous population of Aboriginal Tasmanians.

== Plot summary ==
In 1857, after their attempts to smuggle contraband goods land them with a heavy fine from the British Customs, Captain Illiam Quillian Kewley and his crew of Manx sailors from Peel are forced to offer their ship for charter. The vessel is quickly hired by a party of Englishmen headed by an eccentric Vicar, the Reverend Geoffrey Wilson, who believes that the Garden of Eden is located in Tasmania and wants to mount an expedition there to find it. However, unbeknownst to the clergyman, one of his fellow travellers has an entirely different reason for journeying to the island. Dr Thomas Potter is a renowned surgeon who is developing a thesis on the races of man and hopes to find some interesting specimens there.

Running parallel with this story, but starting some 30 or so years earlier, are the recollections of Peevay, one of Tasmania's natives, who describes the devastating impact the white settlers had on his people, and the Aboriginal people's struggle to adapt to the cultural changes which were forced on them.

Many of the chapters alternate between the two different time periods, but when the Manx ship eventually docks in Tasmania, both strands of the story are brought together for the book's conclusion.

== Reception ==
Kirkus Reviews called it "impressively knowledgeable, and very moving historical novel," while Publishers Weekly referred to it as a "rich tale"; they highlighted how "somehow Kneale manages to keep the reader from becoming confused", despite the novel being "told by 20 different voices skipping back and forth across the years", crediting "Kneale's careful research and colorful storytelling result in an impressive epic".

Awards for English Passengers
Year	Award	Result	Ref.
2000	Booker Prize	Shortlist	
2000	Miles Franklin Award	Shortlist	
2000	Whitbread Book of the Year	Winner	
2002	Relay Prix d'Evasion	Winner	
