= Lüftlmalerei =

Form of mural art in Germany and Austria

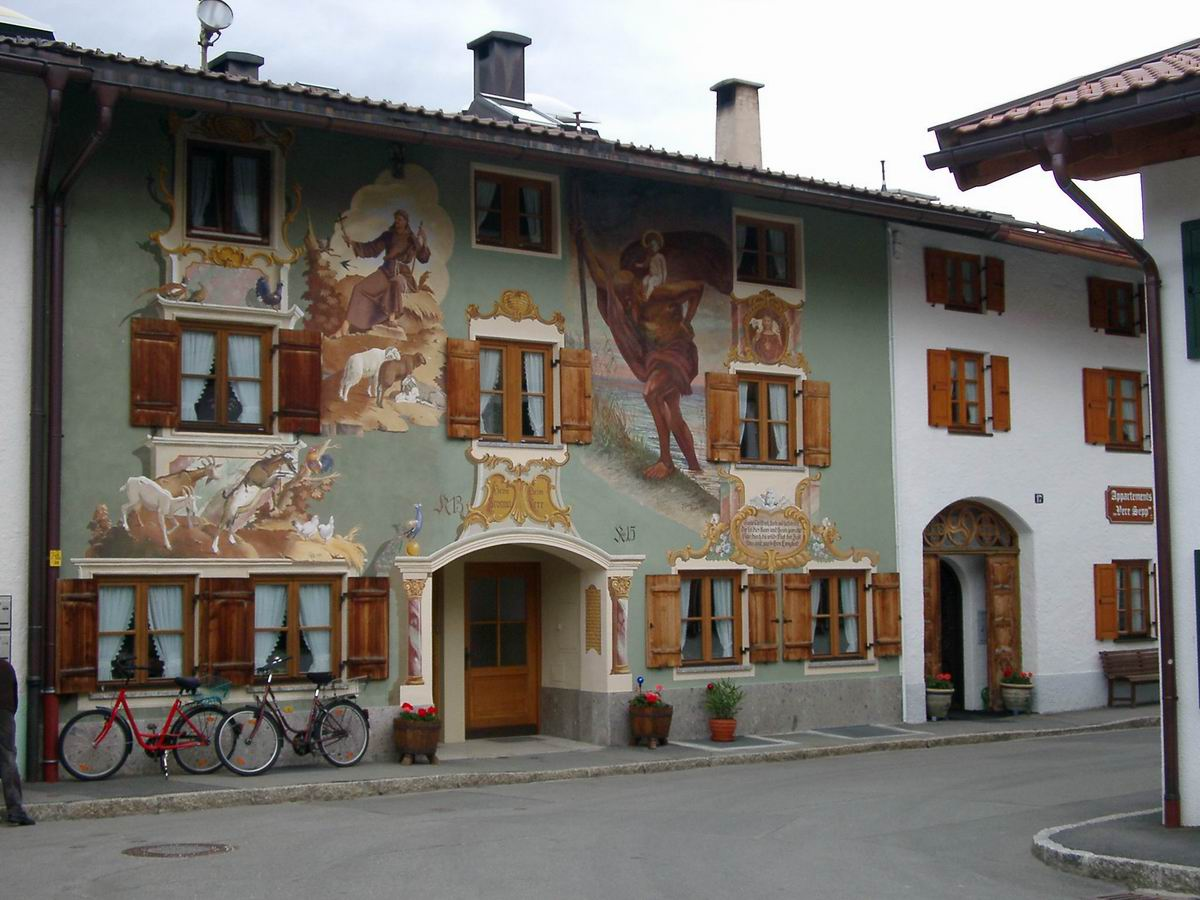
Mittenwald, Ballenhausgasse 13/15

Lüftlmalerei (also spelt Lüftelmalerei) is a form of mural art that is native to villages and towns of southern Germany and Austria, especially in Upper Bavaria (Werdenfelser Land) and in the Tyrol.

== Style ==
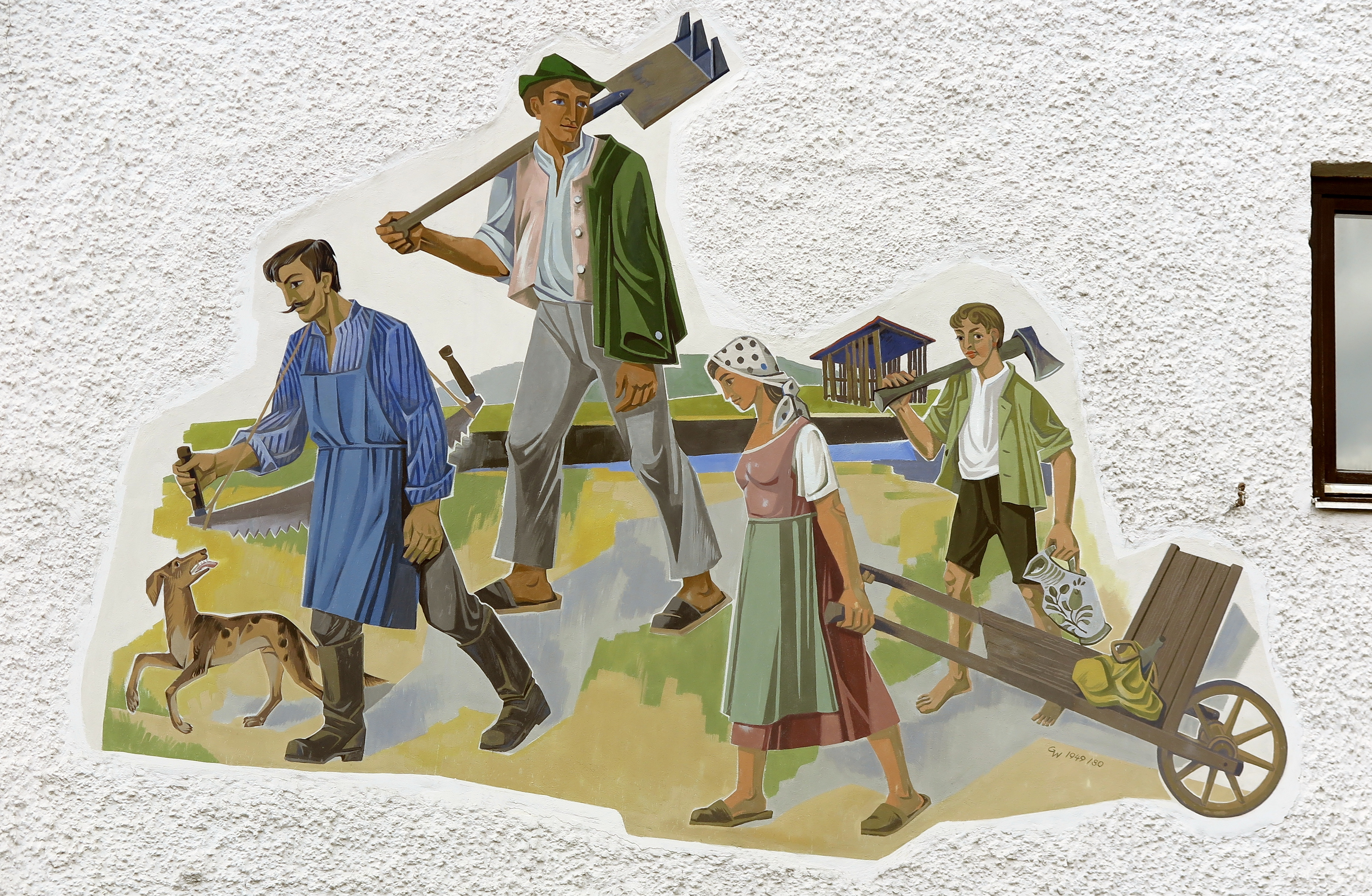
Lüftlmalerei depicting peat workers (1948) 48.195064°N 11.372676°E

The origin of the term is disputed but may have come from the name of the home of the façade artist, Franz Seraph Zwinck (1748–1792) of Oberammergau, Zum Lüftl.

Lüftlmalerei is a popular, folk-oriented variation of trompe-l'œil from the Baroque and imitates architectural elements. As in 'high architecture' it also embeds pictorial cartouches, mirrors and fields. Its subject matter ranges from the patron saints of houses or house emblems to representations of Biblical stories and the classical motifs of peasant art from everyday rural life to hunting. Banners with mottoes are common and the sundial is also a popular element.

The paintings are applied to the fresh lime plaster using a fresco technique, whereby the colours silicify with the plaster in a chemical reaction and the paintings are thus able to survive for a long time. Today, other weatherproof painting materials are also used.

== Architectural examples ==
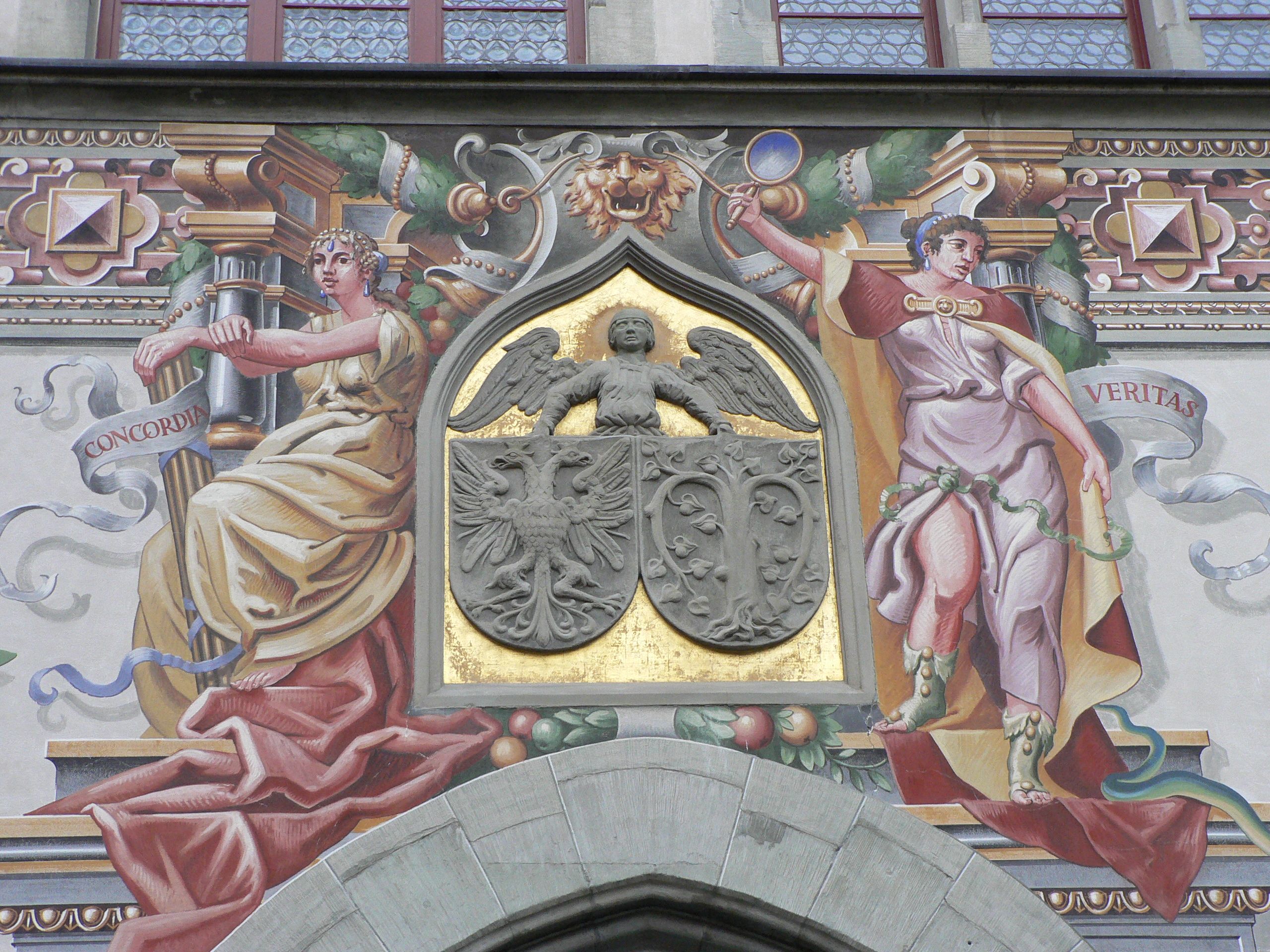
Rathaus portal at Lindau (Bodensee)

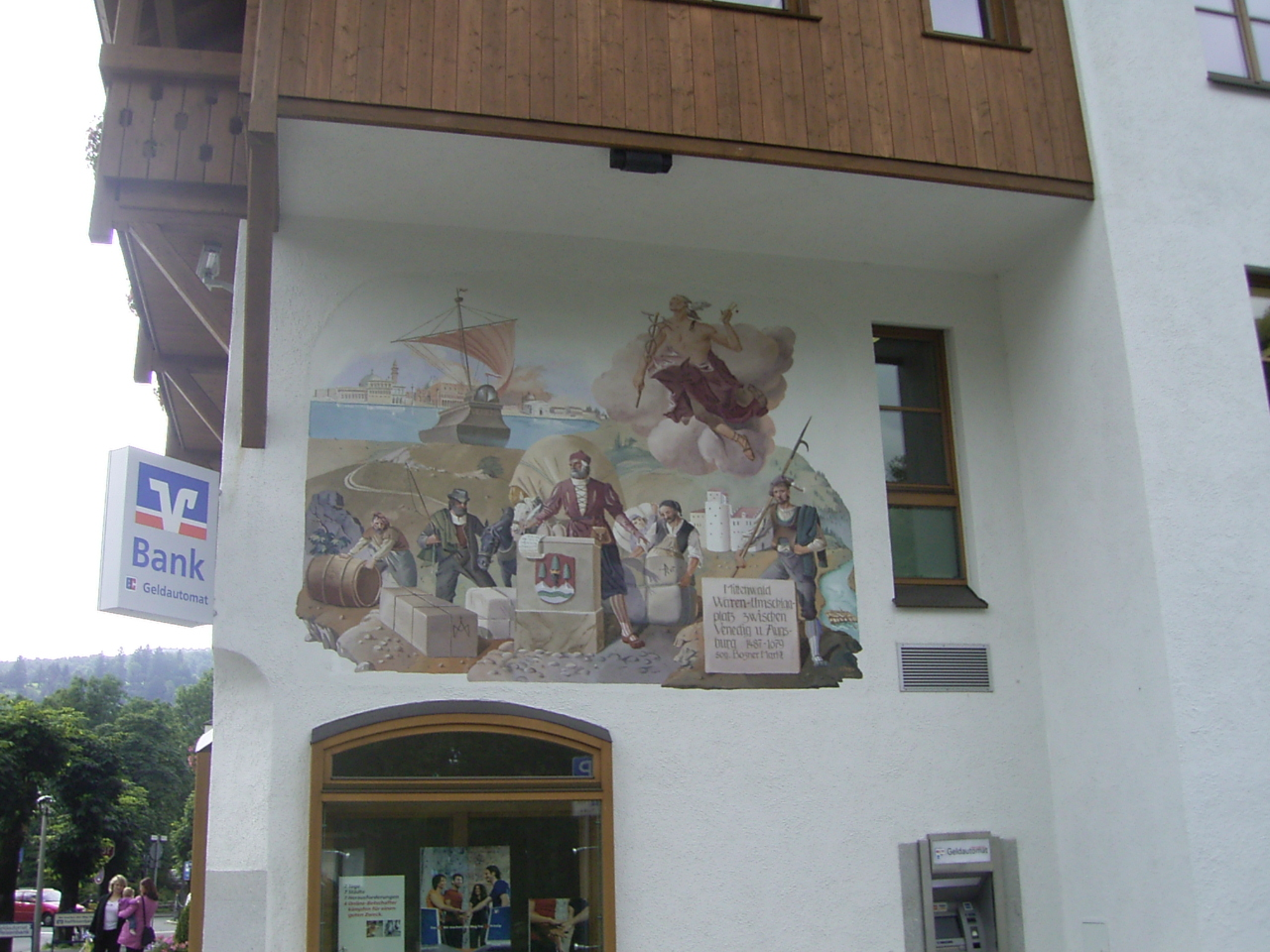
Mittenwald, detail

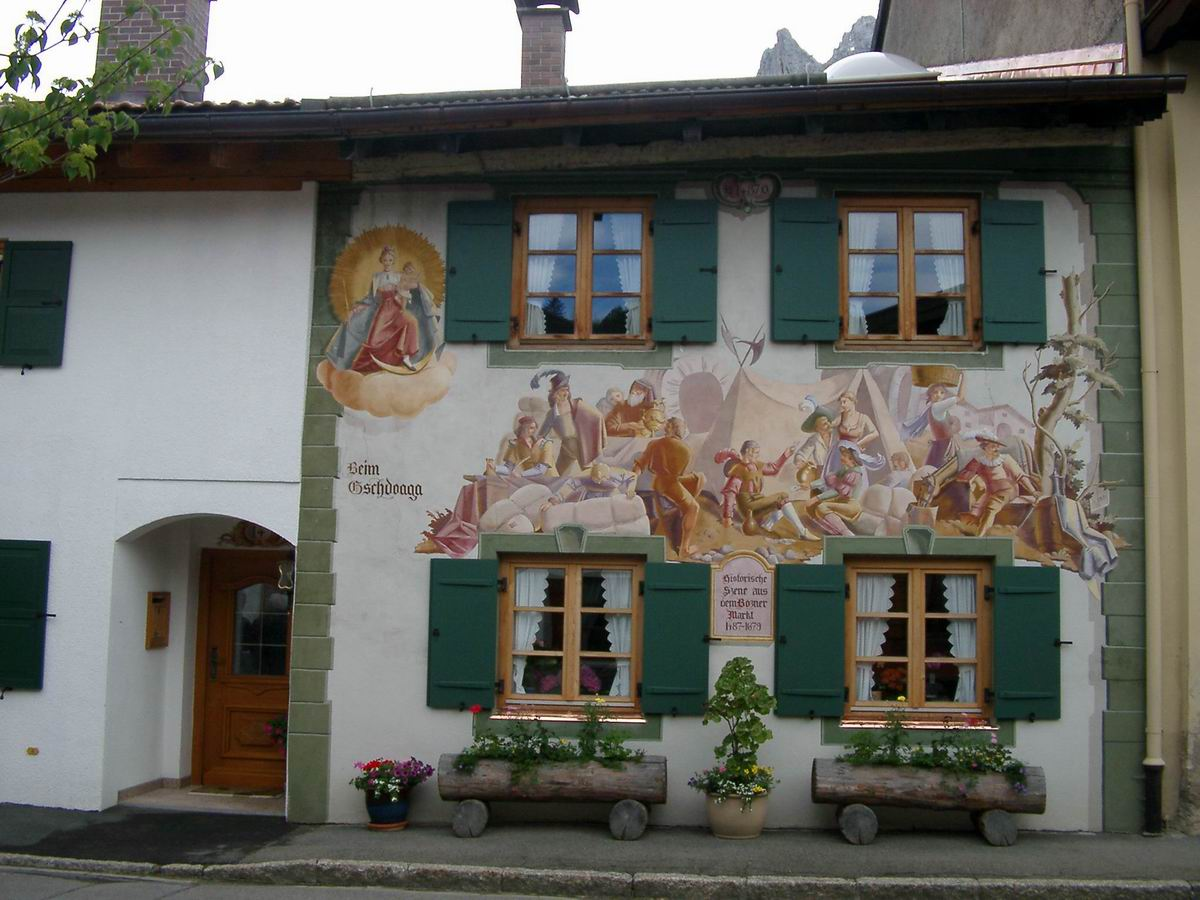
Mittenwald, Ballenhausgasse 12, Beim Gschdoaga

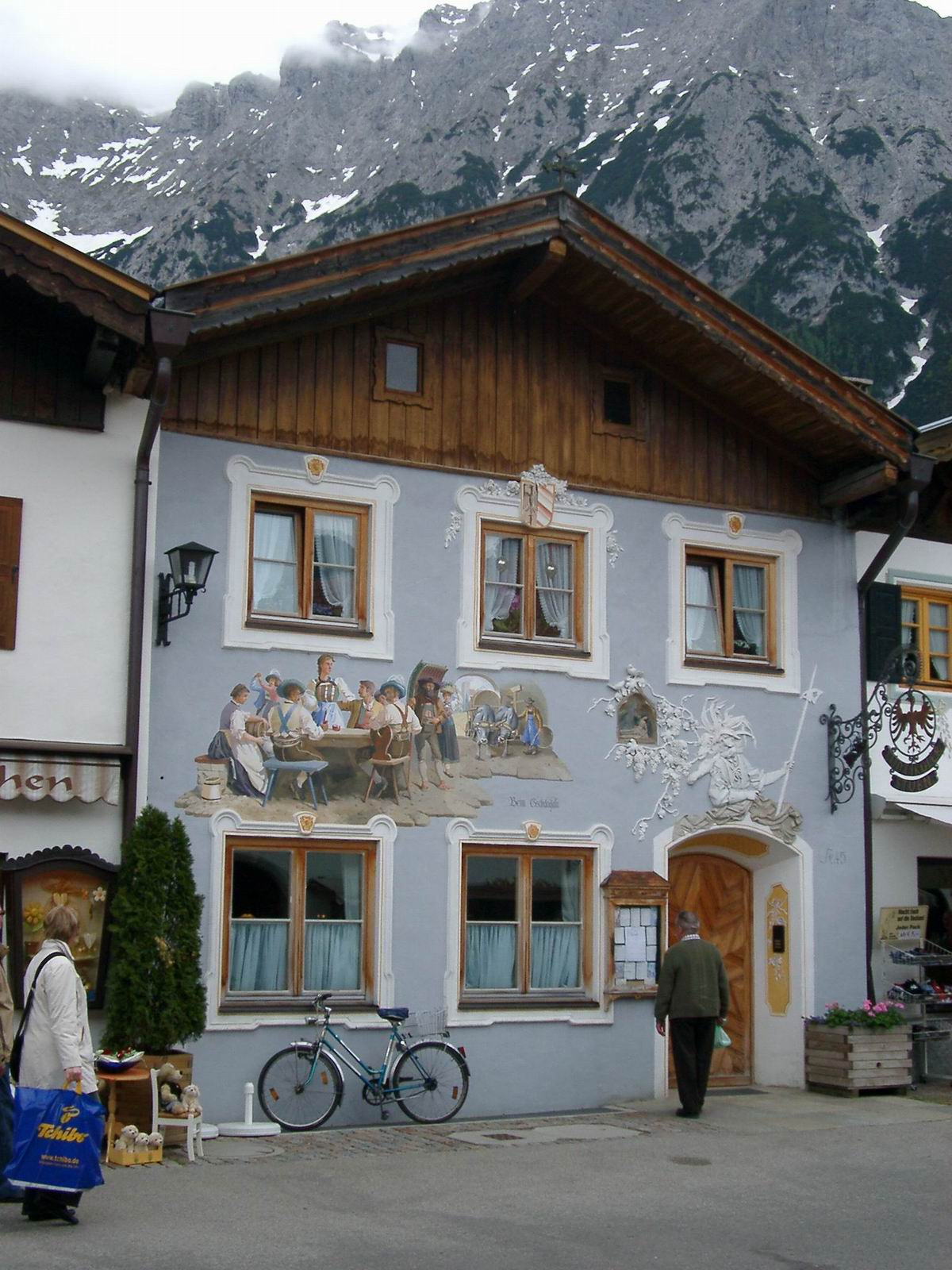
Mittenwald, Obermarkt 45, Südtiroler Stubn

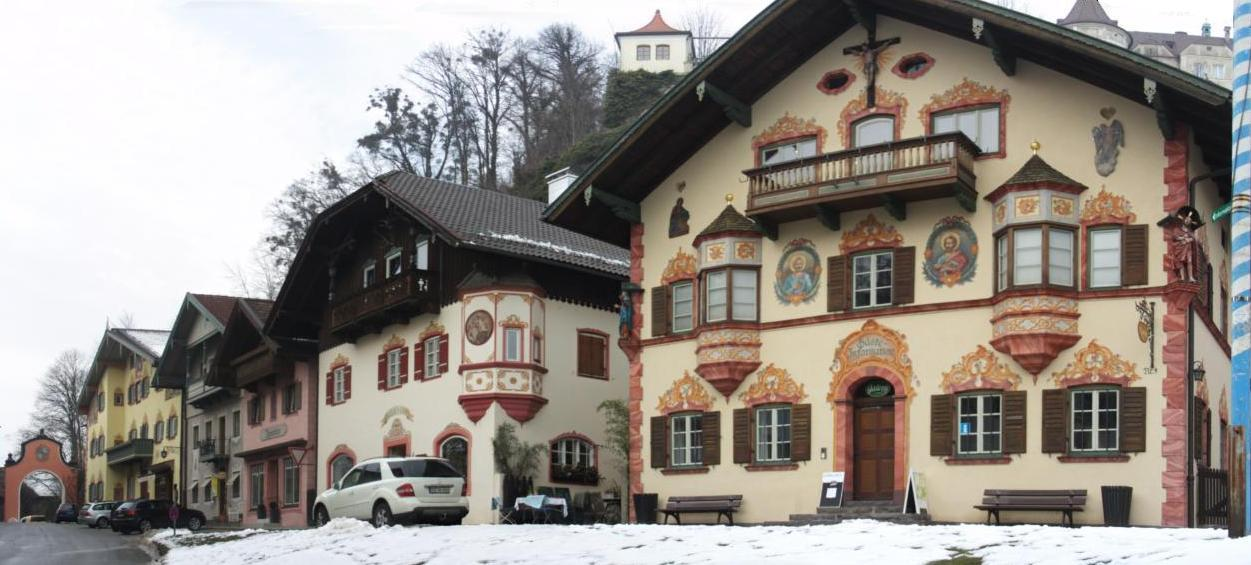
Neubeuern market place, county of Rosenheim

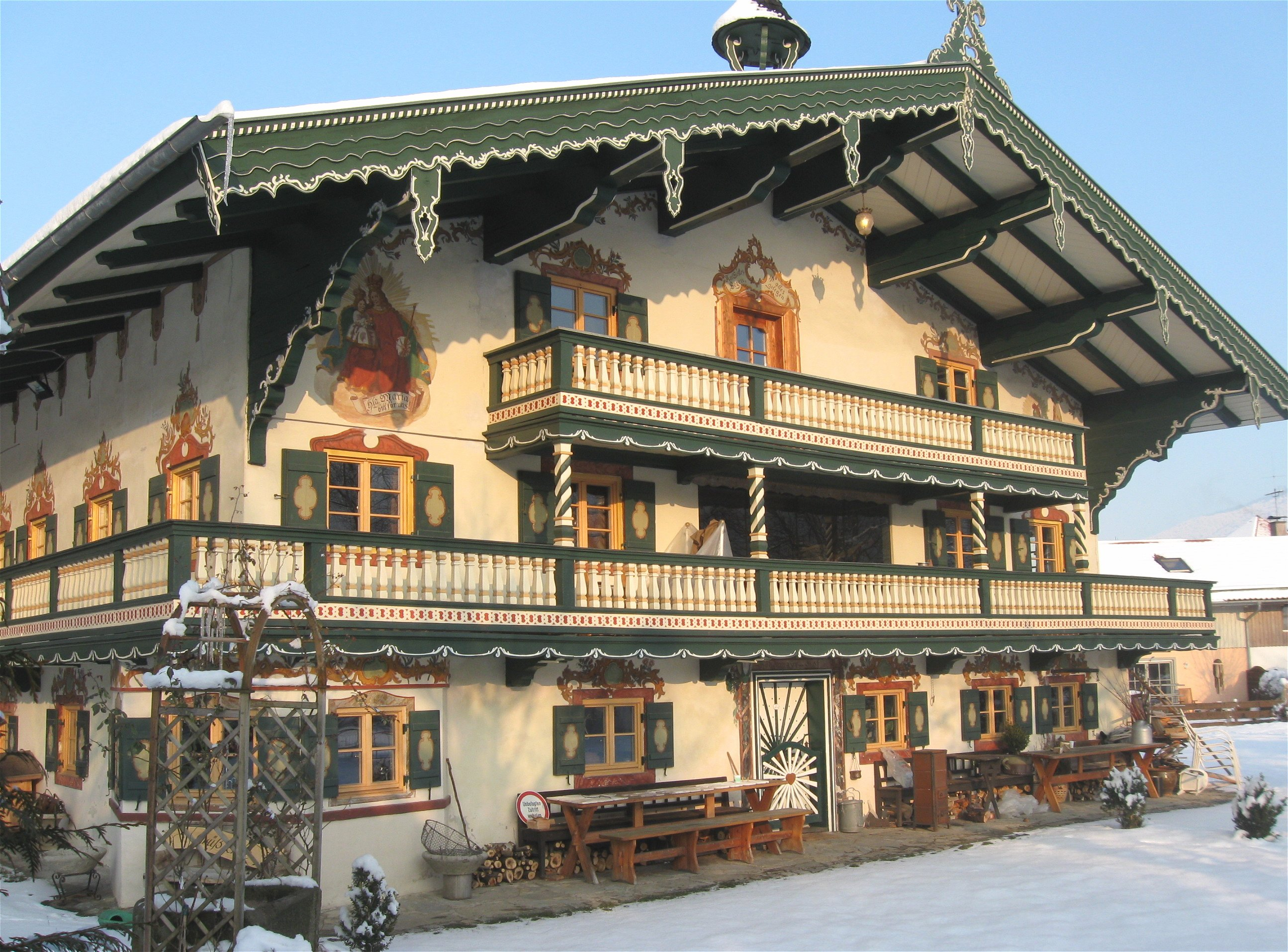
Kiefersfelden, Bauernhaus

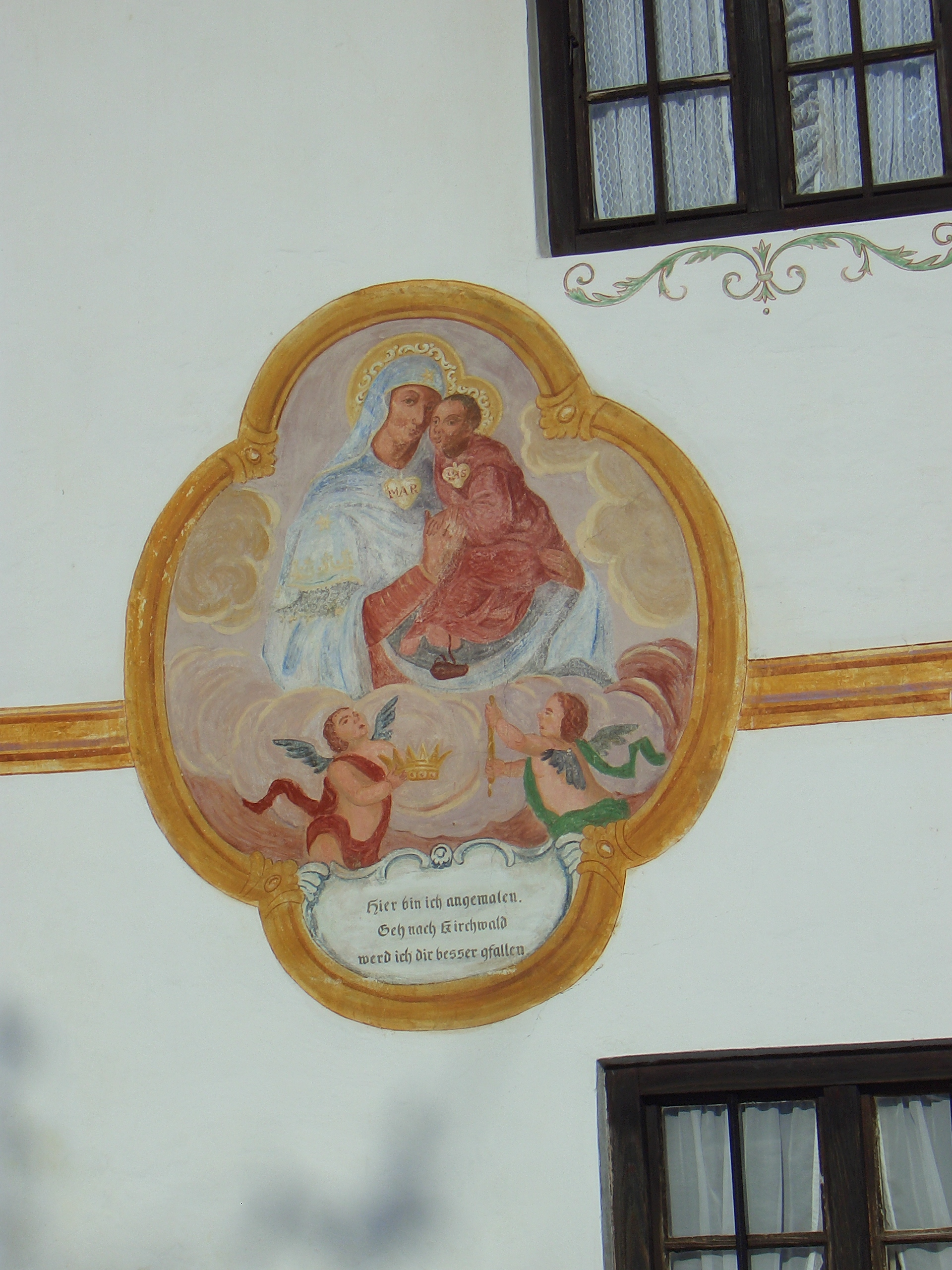
Samerberg, Bauernhaus

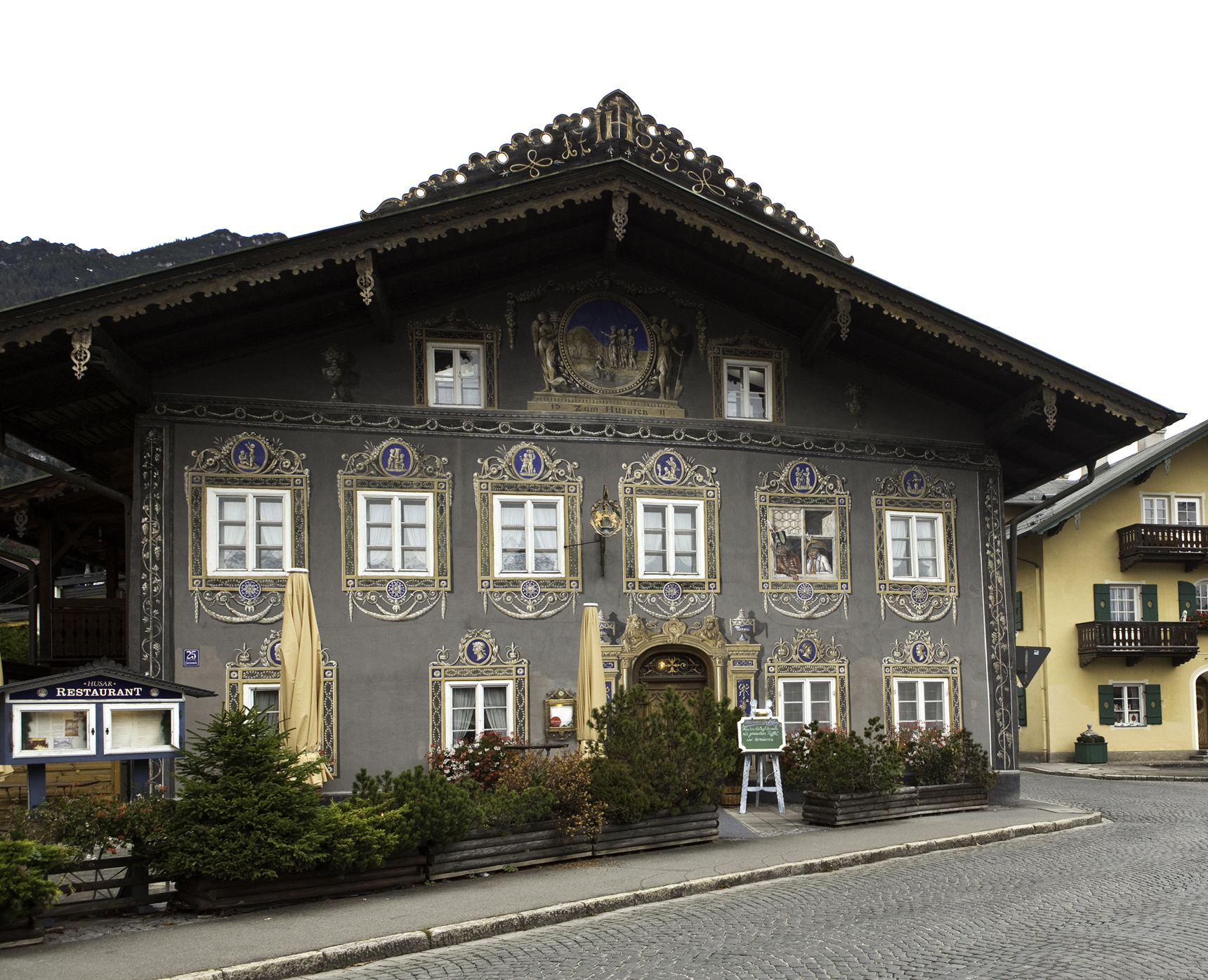
Garmisch-Partenkirchen, Zum Husaren

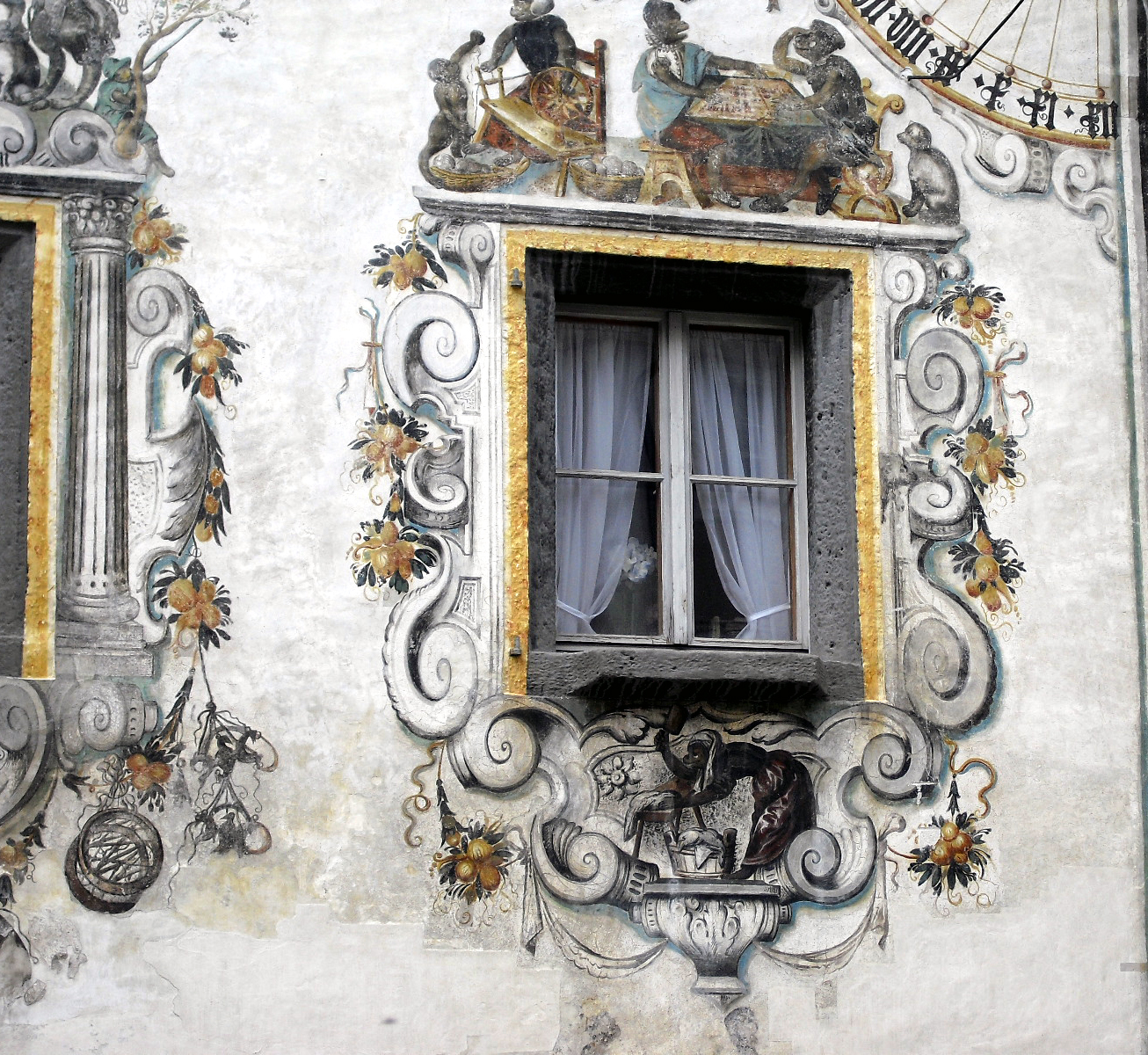
Berchtesgaden, Hirschhaus

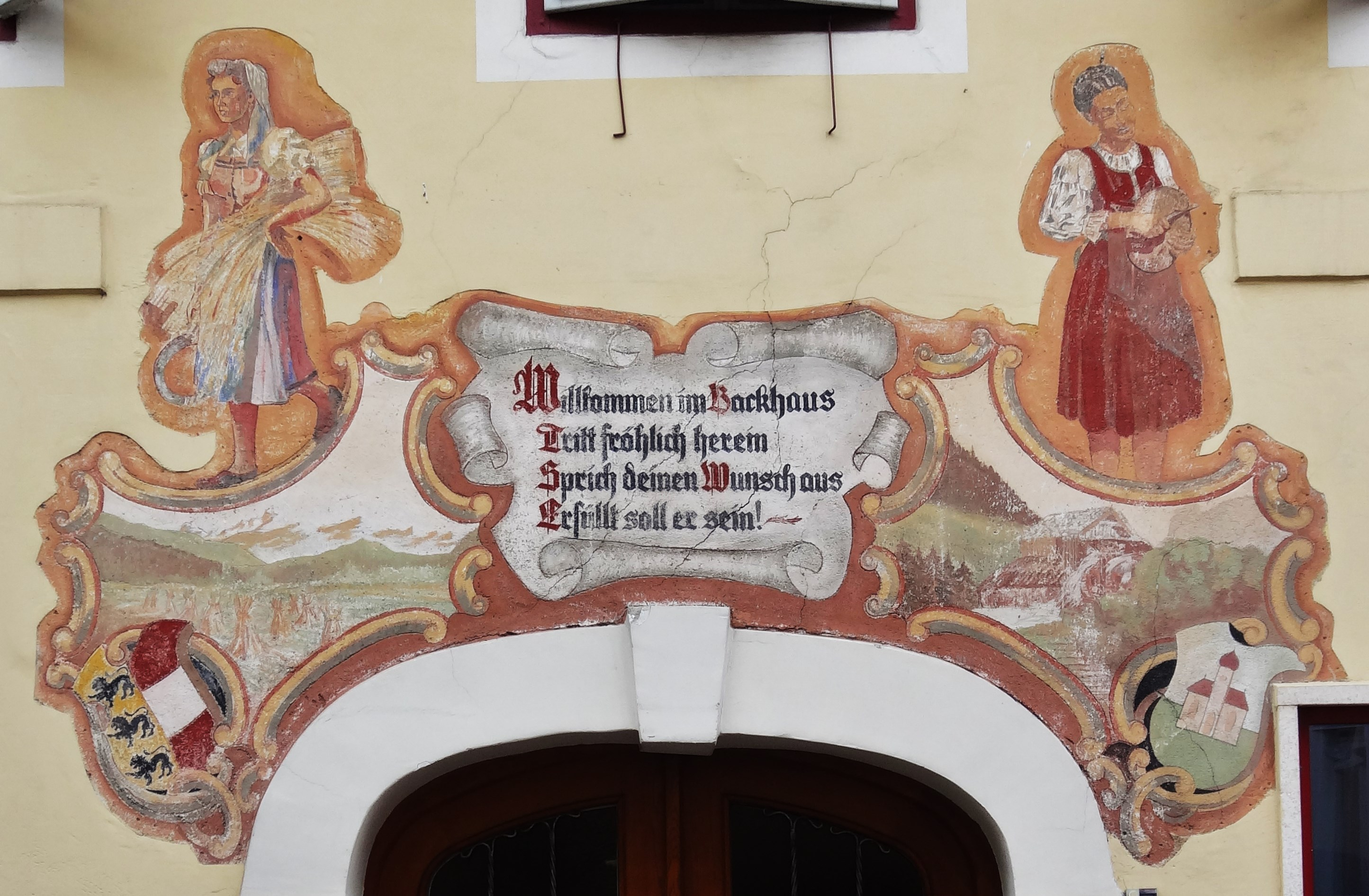
Feldkirchen in Kärnten, painting above the entrance of an old bakery

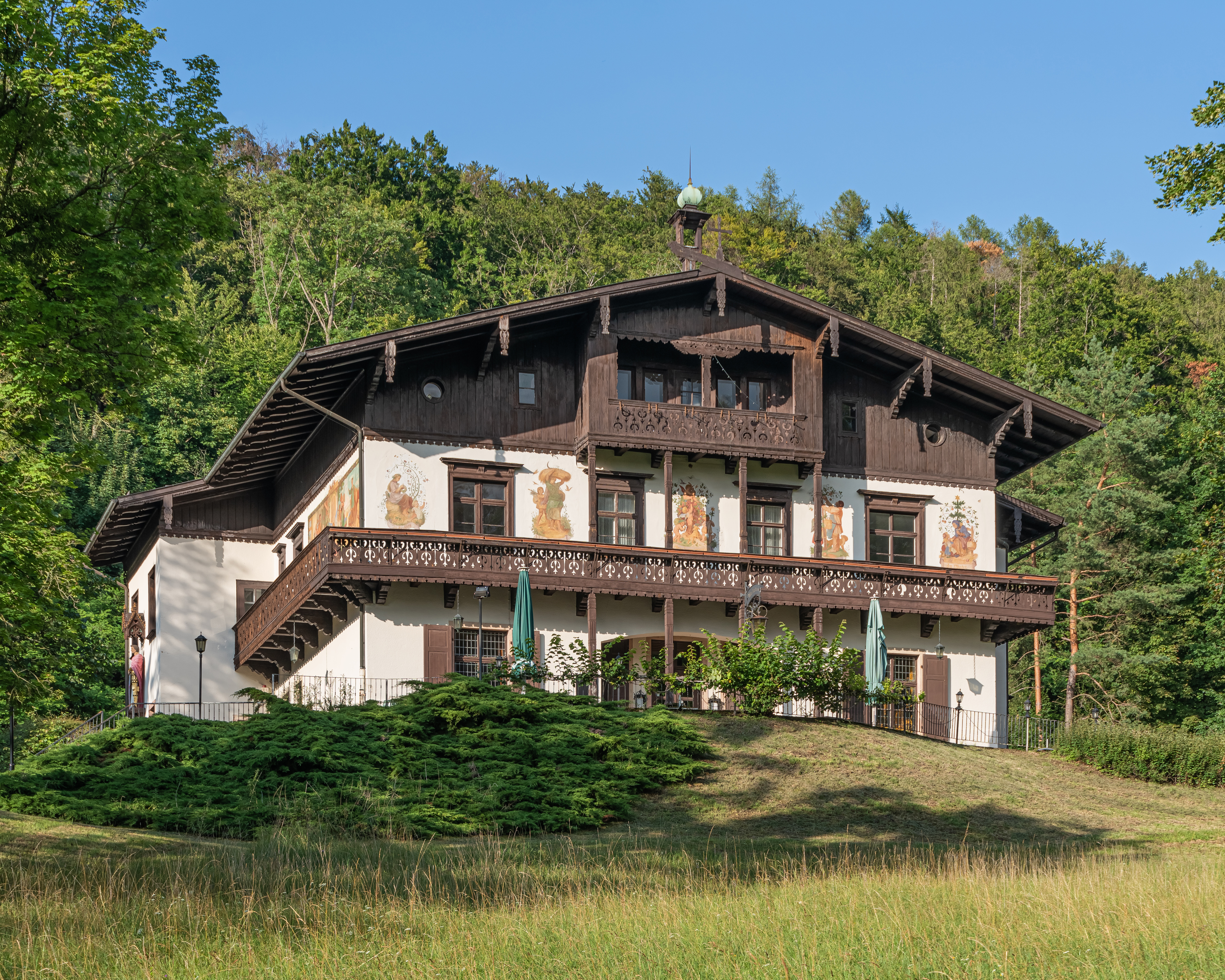
Bad Liebenstein, Villa Feodora

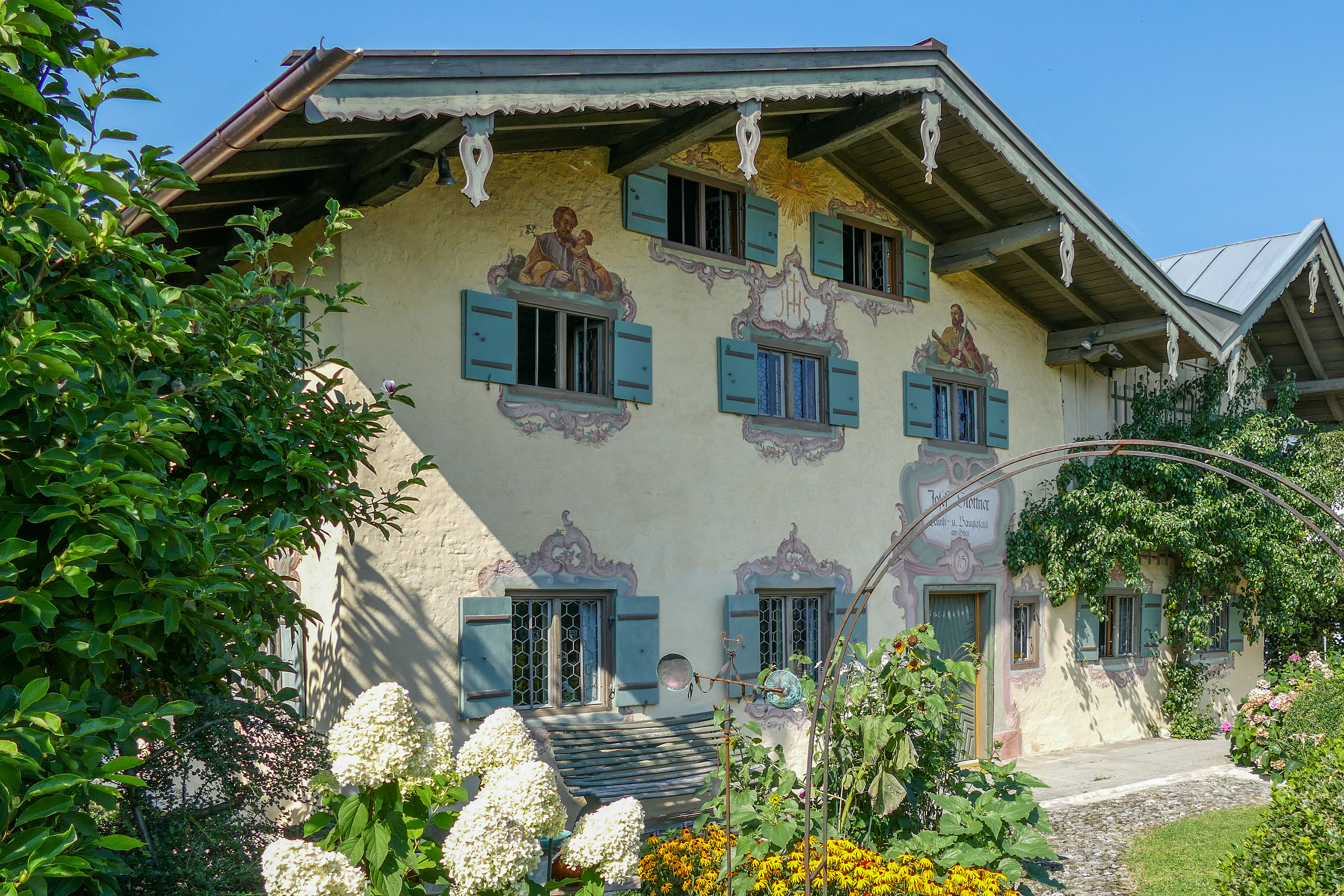
The Stettner House in Prien am Chiemsee, village of "Am Gries"

== Literature ==
ISBN 3929229927
