= Stanley and the Women (novel) =

1984 novel by Kingsley Amis

- Cover of first edition (hardcover)
- Author: Kingsley Amis
- Cover artist: Alistair Taylor
- Language: English
- Genre: Comedy novel
- Publisher: Hutchinson
- Publication date: 1984
- Publication place: United Kingdom
- Media type: Print (hardback & paperback)
- Pages: 256 pp
- ISBN: 0-09-156240 6

Stanley and the Women (ISBN 978-0-06097-145-8) is a 1984 novel by British author Kingsley Amis.

== Plot ==
Stanley Duke works in advertising, and had been married to an actress, Nowell. He is now married to Susan, with whom he has a complicated relationship, seemingly because of her mother, Lady Daly. His son, Steve, suffers a mental breakdown, and Stanley takes him to two psychiatrists. The first, Dr. Collings, is female and too liberated for Stanley; and the second, Dr. Nash, seems to be more interested in drinking than helping his son.

A doctor's suggestion that all women are mad becomes an increasing obsession with Stanley (in parallel with Steve's increasing insanity) culminating in outbursts of offensive misogynistic bigotry. Various ironic episodes of middle-class London life - including a successful dinner party; a less successful drunken evening with Nowell's second husband; Stanley's removal from his job; and others - all drive continuing reassessments of the characters. The ending floats a possibility that all women are in fact terrifyingly sane.

== Major themes ==
Marilyn Butler suggested resemblances between Dr. Collings and such anti-psychiatry figures as R. D. Laing, who like her saw the family unit as a factor in apparent schizophrenia such as Steve's.

== Reception ==
Marilyn Butler for the London Review of Books says that Amis "has created a world in which only men appear to communicate with one another, and their favourite topic is their dislike of women". Despite the blurb on the jacket ("it is not a book that is likely to win many prizes for fairness or fashionable social attitudes"), she felt it was not the chauvinistic novel it was promoted as, but "sensitive, thoughtful and open-minded", suggesting that the narrator's views should be not be read as Amis's own.

Amis' son, Martin, called it "a mean little novel in every sense, sour, spare, and viciously well-organized".

== Adaptation ==
The novel was adapted for television by Nigel Kneale and directed by David Tucker. It was produced by Central Independent Television for the ITV network.
