= Nigel Kneale =

Manx screenwriter (1922–2006)

- Kneale in 1990, discussing his career on BBC Two's The Late Show
- Born: Thomas Nigel Kneale; 18 April 1922; Barrow-in-Furness, Lancashire, England
- Died: 29 October 2006 (aged 84); London, England
- Education: Royal Academy of Dramatic Art
- Occupations: Screenwriter, author
- Spouse: Judith Kerr (m. 1954)
- Children: 2, including Matthew Kneale
- Writing career
- Pen name: Nigel Neale
- Period: 1946–1997
- Genres: Horror; science fiction; thriller

Thomas Nigel Kneale (18 April 1922 – 29 October 2006) was a Manx screenwriter and author whose career spanned between 1946 and 1997. Predominantly a writer of thrillers that used science fiction and horror elements, he was best known for creating the fictional scientist Professor Bernard Quatermass. He has been described as "one of the most influential writers of the 20th century", and as "having invented popular TV".

Born in England and raised in the Isle of Man, Kneale studied acting at the Royal Academy of Dramatic Art, beginning his entertainment career with BBC Radio. He won the 1950 Somerset Maugham Award for his short story collection Tomato Cain & Other Stories. Kneale was most active in television, joining BBC Television in 1951; his final script was transmitted on ITV in 1997. His breakthrough as a screenwriter came in 1953, writing the highly successful BBC television serial The Quatermass Experiment.

Kneale's signature character went on to appear in various television, film and radio productions written by Kneale for the BBC, Hammer Film Productions and Thames Television between 1953 and 1996. Kneale wrote original scripts and successfully adapted works by writers such as George Orwell, John Osborne, H. G. Wells and Susan Hill. He also wrote well-received television dramas such as The Year of the Sex Olympics (1968) and The Stone Tape (1972).

Kneale was twice nominated for the BAFTA Award for Best British Screenplay, for Look Back in Anger (1959) and The Entertainer (1960), both directed by Tony Richardson. He received the Horror Writers Association's Bram Stoker Award for Lifetime Achievement in 2001.

== Biography ==
=== Early life ===
Kneale was born Thomas Nigel Kneale in Barrow-in-Furness, England on 28 April 1922. His family came from the Isle of Man, and returned to live there in 1928, when he was six years old. He was raised in the island's capital, Douglas, where his father was the owner and editor of the local newspaper, The Herald. He was educated at St Ninian's High School, Douglas and trained to become an advocate at the Manx Bar. He also worked in a lawyer's office, but became bored with his legal training and abandoned the profession. At the beginning of the Second World War Kneale attempted to enlist in the British Army, but was deemed medically unfit for service owing to photophobia, from which he had suffered since childhood.

=== 1946–1950: Acting career ===
On 25 March 1946 Kneale made his first broadcast on BBC Radio, performing a live reading of his own short story "Tomato Cain" in a strand entitled Stories by Northern Authors on the BBC's North of England Home Service region. Later that year he left the Isle of Man and moved to London, where he studied acting at the Royal Academy of Dramatic Art (RADA). He made further radio broadcasts in the 1940s, including a reading of his story Zachary Crebbin's Angel on the BBC Light Programme, broadcast nationally on 19 May 1948. He also had short stories published in magazines such as Argosy and The Strand. He began using the name "Nigel Kneale" for these professional credits, but was known as "Tom" to his family and friends up until his death.

After graduating from RADA, Kneale worked for a short time as a professional actor performing in small roles at the Stratford Memorial Theatre in Stratford-upon-Avon. He continued to write in his spare time and in 1949 a collection of his work, Tomato Cain and Other Stories, was published. The book sufficiently impressed the writer Elizabeth Bowen that she wrote a foreword for it, and in 1950 the collection won the Somerset Maugham Award.

Following this success, Kneale gave up acting to write full-time. He did take small voice-over roles in some of his 1950s television productions, such as the voice heard on the factory loudspeaker system in Quatermass II (1955), for which he also narrated most of the recaps shown at the beginning of each episode. Kneale's publisher was keen for him to write a novel, but Kneale himself was more interested in writing for television. A keen cinema-goer, he believed that the audience being able to see human faces was an important factor in storytelling.

=== 1950–1953: Kneale's early BBC screenplay work ===
Kneale's first professional script writing credit came when he wrote the radio drama The Long Stairs, broadcast by the BBC on 1 March 1950 and based on an historical mining disaster on the Isle of Man. In 1951 he was recruited as one of the first staff writers to be employed by BBC Television; before he started working for the station, Kneale had never seen any television. Kneale was initially a general-purpose writer, working on adaptations of books and stage plays and even writing material for light entertainment and children's programmes. The following year, Michael Barry became the Head of Drama at BBC Television, and spent his entire first year's script budget of £250 to hire Kneale as a full-time writer for the drama department. Kneale's first credited role in adult television drama was providing "additional dialogue" for the play Arrow to the Heart, broadcast on 20 July 1952. This play was adapted and directed by the Austrian television director Rudolph Cartier, who had also joined the staff of the BBC drama department in 1952.

Kneale's "lost" radio play You Must Listen, broadcast in 1952, was re-broadcast in a new production by BBC Radio 4 on 20 September 2023.

=== 1953: The Quatermass Experiment ===
Kneale wrote The Quatermass Experiment, which was broadcast in six half-hour episodes in July and August 1953. The serial told the story of Professor Bernard Quatermass of the British Experimental Rocket Group, and the consequences of his sending the first crewed mission into space where a terrible fate befalls the crew and only one returns. The Quatermass Experiment was one of the first adult television science-fiction productions, held a large television audience gripped across its six weeks, and has been described by the Museum of Broadcast Communications as dramatising "a new range of gendered fears about Britain's postwar and post-colonial security." Kneale chose the character's surname because many Manx surnames began with "Qu"; the actual name itself was picked from a London telephone directory. The Professor's first name was chosen in honour of the astronomer Bernard Lovell.

The BBC recognised the success of the serial, particularly in the context of the impending arrival of commercial television to the UK. Controller of Programmes Cecil McGivern wrote in a memo that: "Had competitive television been in existence then, we would have killed it every Saturday night while [The Quatermass Experiment] lasted. We are going to need many more 'Quatermass Experiment' programmes." Like all of Kneale's television work for the BBC in the 1950s, The Quatermass Experiment was transmitted live; only the first two episodes were telerecorded and survive in the BBC's archives.

In the autumn of 1955, Hammer Film Productions released The Quatermass Xperiment, their film adaptation of the serial. Kneale was not pleased with the film, and particularly disliked the casting of Brian Donlevy as Quatermass, as he explained in a 1986 interview. "[Donlevy] was then really on the skids and didn't care what he was doing. He took very little interest in the making of the films or in playing the part. It was a case of take the money and run. Or in the case of Mr Donlevy, waddle."

=== 1953–1956: Later BBC works ===
Kneale and Cartier next collaborated on an adaptation of Wuthering Heights (broadcast 6 December 1953) and then on a version of George Orwell's novel Nineteen Eighty-Four (12 December 1954). Nineteen Eighty-Four was a particularly notable production; many found it shocking, and questions were asked in Parliament about whether some of the scenes had been suitable for television. There was also prominent support for the play; the Duke of Edinburgh made it known that he and the Queen had watched and enjoyed the programme, and the second live performance on 16 December gained the largest television audience since her coronation the previous year. The Guardian newspaper's obituary of Kneale in 2006 claimed that the adaptation had "permanently revived Orwell's reputation," while the British Film Institute included it in their list of the 100 Greatest British Television Programmes of the 20th century in 2000.

The Creature—an original script by Kneale concerning the legend of the abominable snowman—was his next collaboration with Cartier, broadcast on 30 January 1955, followed by an adaptation of Peter Ustinov's play The Moment of Truth (10 March 1955), before Kneale was commissioned to write Quatermass II. Specifically designed by the BBC to combat the threat of the new ITV network, which launched just a month before Quatermass II was shown, the serial was even more successful than the first, drawing audiences of up to nine million viewers. Kneale was inspired in writing the serial by contemporary fears over secret UK Ministry of Defence research establishments such as Porton Down, as well the fact that as a BBC staff writer he had been required to sign the Official Secrets Act.

Quatermass II was Kneale's final original script for the BBC as a staff writer. He left the corporation when his contract expired at the end of 1956; "Five years in that hut was as much as any sane person could stand," he later told an interviewer.

=== 1956–1958: Further Quatermass works ===
In the same year that he left the BBC, Kneale wrote his first feature film screenplay, adapting Quatermass II for Hammer Film Productions along with producer Anthony Hinds and director Val Guest. Hinds and Guest had overseen the first Quatermass film, upon which Kneale had been unable to work due to his BBC staff contract. Kneale was disappointed that Brian Donlevy also returned in the role of Quatermass. The film premiered at the end of May 1957, and was reviewed positively in The Times: "The writer of the original story, Mr Nigel Kneale, and the director, Mr Val Guest, between them keep things moving at the right speed, without digressions. The film has an air of respect for the issues touched on, and this impression is confirmed by the acting generally." 1957 also saw the release of another cinematic collaboration between Kneale and Guest, when Kneale adapted his 1955 BBC play The Creature into The Abominable Snowman; in this case, Hammer retained the star of the BBC version, Peter Cushing.

In May 1957, Kneale was contracted by the BBC to write a third Quatermass serial, and this was eventually transmitted as Quatermass and the Pit across six weeks in December 1958 and January 1959. On this occasion Kneale was inspired by the racial tensions that had recently been seen in the United Kingdom, and which came to a head while the serial was in pre-production when the Notting Hill race riots occurred in August and September 1958. Drawing audiences of up to 11 million, Quatermass and the Pit has been referred to by the BBC's own website as "simply the first finest thing the BBC ever made." It was also included in the British Film Institute's "TV 100" list in 2000, where it was praised for the themes and subtexts it explored. "In a story which mined mythology and folklore ... under the guise of genre it tackled serious themes of man's hostile nature and the military's perversion of science for its own ends."

Despite the success of the serial, Kneale felt that he had now taken the character of Quatermass as far as he could. "I didn't want to go on repeating because Professor Quatermass had already saved the world from ultimate destruction three times, and that seemed to me to be quite enough," he said in 1986. It was also his final new collaboration with Rudolph Cartier, although the director did later handle a new version of Kneale's 1953 adaptation of Wuthering Heights for the BBC in 1962.

=== 1958–1966: Film screenplays and adaptations ===
In 1958, Kneale's play Mrs Wickens in the Fall, transmitted by the BBC the previous year, was remade by the CBS network in the United States, retitled The Littlest Enemy. Broadcast on 18 June as part of The United States Steel Hour anthology series, the script was severely cut back in length. It was Kneale's only involvement with American television, and he was not pleased with the result. "I made up my mind I would never ever again have anything done on a television network in America," he later commented.

For the next few years, Kneale concentrated mostly on film screenplays, adapting plays and novels for the cinema. Described by The Independent as "one of the few writers not to fall out with John Osborne", Kneale adapted Osborne's plays Look Back in Anger and The Entertainer in 1958 and 1960 respectively, both for director Tony Richardson. Kneale knew Richardson through having previously adapted a Chekhov short story for the BBC, which Richardson had directed. Kneale was nominated for the British Film Award (later known as a BAFTA) for Best Screenplay for both films. Film producer Harry Saltzman, who had produced the two Osborne adaptations, approached Kneale about scripting a project he was working on to adapt Ian Fleming's James Bond novels for the cinema; Kneale was not a fan of Fleming's work and turned the offer down.

Kneale completed screenplays for adaptations of the novels Lord of the Flies by William Golding and Brave New World by Aldous Huxley. Neither of these scripts ever saw production, as the companies making them went out of business. Another screenplay that went unproduced was a Kneale original, a drama involving a wave of teenage suicides called The Big Giggle, or The Big, Big Giggle. Written in 1965 while Kneale was suffering from a mystery illness and forced to stay in bed for a long period, the concept was produced as a drama serial for the BBC, before the corporation reconsidered the nature of the storyline and the possibility of copycat suicides; Kneale later agreed with their decision not to make it for television. The production was nearly made as a film by 20th Century Fox, but John Trevelyan, Chief Executive of the British Board of Film Censors, forbade the script's production.

In 1966, Kneale worked again for Hammer Film Productions when he adapted Norah Lofts's 1960 novel The Devil's Own into the horror film The Witches. Kneale had worked on the screenplay for the adaptation in 1961, the same year in which he had begun to adapt Quatermass and the Pit for Hammer. Like The Witches, the film version of Quatermass and the Pit took several years to reach the screen, eventually being released in 1967. Roy Ward Baker directed, with Andrew Keir starring as Quatermass. Kneale was much happier with this version than the previous Hammer Quatermass adaptations, and the film was described by The Independent in 2006 as "one of the best ever Hammer productions." Quatermass and the Pit was Kneale's final credited film work; 1979's The Quatermass Conclusion was only released to cinemas in overseas markets after it was made for television in the UK, and he had his name removed from the credits of Halloween III: Season of the Witch (1982).

=== 1963–1974: Return to the BBC ===
Kneale returned to writing for television with the BBC when his play The Road was broadcast in September 1963. The play concerned the population of an 18th-century village who become haunted by visions of a future nuclear war, and was followed by several one-off dramas for the BBC over the following decade, including two entries into BBC1's The Wednesday Play anthology strand. During this period he was regarded as one of the finest writers working for the BBC by Shaun Sutton, the Head of Drama for BBC television. Kneale did his first work for the ITV network during this time, writing a one-off play called The Crunch for the ATV company in 1964.

A particular critical success was The Year of the Sex Olympics, broadcast as part of BBC2's Theatre 625 series in July 1968. In the programme, a group of people creates a show-within-a-show called The Live Life Show, in which a family are filmed as they struggle to live on an isolated rural island. It becomes a massive success, especially when a murderer is introduced into the set-up. The Year of the Sex Olympics has been praised for its foreshadowing of the rise of reality television programmes such as Big Brother (1999–present) and Celebrity Love Island (2005–2006). Critic Nancy Banks-Smith wrote in 2003 that: "In The Year of the Sex Olympics [Kneale] foretold the reality show and, in the scramble for greater sensation, its logical outcome ... This is satire from a TV insider, but it mutates into something far more desolate and disorientating."

In 1965, Kneale had been approached by the producer of the BBC2 science-fiction anthology series Out of the Unknown to write a new one-off 75-minute Quatermass story for the programme. Nothing came of this, but he would write The Chopper six years later for the fourth and final series. It was about the vengeful spirit of a dead motorcyclist who is reluctant to leave his wrecked machine and manifests itself to a woman journalist as motorbike noise. It featured Patrick Troughton as a mechanic, although the episode is now lost. In 1972 he was commissioned by the BBC to write a new four-part Quatermass serial, based in a dystopian near future world overrun with crime, apathy, martial law and youth cults. The serial was announced as a forthcoming production by the BBC in November, and some model filming was even begun in June 1973, but eventually budgetary problems and the unavailability of Stonehenge—a central location in the scripts—led to the project's cancellation.

Kneale's next script for the BBC was The Stone Tape, a scientific ghost story broadcast on Christmas Day 1972. Lez Cooke praised the production, when writing in 2003, describing it as "one of the most imaginative and intelligent examples of the horror genre to appear on British television, a single play to rank alongside the best of Play for Today." His final BBC work was an entry into a series called Bedtime Stories, adapting traditional fairy tales into adult dramas. Kneale's last script for the BBC, Jack and the Beanstalk, was transmitted on 24 March 1974.

=== 1974–1982: Early ITV work ===
Kneale's remaining television work was written for ITV. His first script for ITV in this period was the one-off play Murrain, made by the network's Midlands franchise holders Associated TeleVision (ATV) in 1975. The play, a horror piece based around witchcraft, led the following year to a series called Beasts, a six-part anthology where Kneale created six different character-based tales of horror and the macabre. It featured some well-known actors such as Martin Shaw, Pauline Quirke and Bernard Horsfall, but did not gain a full network run on ITV; different regions transmitted the episodes in different timeslots and some in different sequences.

In the mid-1970s, Kneale made his only attempt at writing a stage play. Called Crow, it was based upon the memoirs of real-life Manx slaver Captain Hugh Crow. Kneale was unable to find backing to produce the play for the stage, but sold the script to ATV who put it into pre-production for television. Shortly before filming it was cancelled by ATV's managing director, Lew Grade, and Kneale was never told why.

Following the cancellation of Crow, Kneale moved to work for another of the ITV companies, Thames Television, who in 1977 commissioned the production of the scripts of Kneale's previously abandoned fourth Quatermass serial, to be produced by their Euston Films subsidiary film company. The production, Quatermass, was structured to work both as a four-episode serial for transmission in the UK, and a 100-minute film version for cinema release overseas—something Kneale later regretted agreeing to. Starring John Mills as Quatermass and with a budget of over £1 million—more than fifty times the budget of Quatermass and the Pit in 1958—the serial was not as critically successful as its predecessors. "Thematically no less awesome than Mr Kneale's earlier science-fiction essays for BBC Television, his ITV debut has proved only a so-so affair", was the verdict of The Times when previewing the final episode. Tying in with the series, Kneale returned to prose fiction when he wrote his only full-length novel, Quatermass, a novelisation of the serial.

Kneale's next television series was a departure from his usual style—Kinvig, his sole attempt at writing a sitcom, produced by London Weekend Television and broadcast on ITV in the autumn of 1981. Although his first out-and-out comedy, Kneale stressed that there had always been elements of humour present throughout his scripts. Some of the press reaction to Kinvig was positive: "If you like the idea of the Hitch-Hiker's Guide but found its realization tiresomely hysterical you may well prefer Kneale's relaxed wit. Cast splendid, direction deft," was The Times's preview of the first episode. The series was not a commercial success, although Kneale later remained personally pleased with it.

=== 1982: Halloween III: Season of the Witch ===
In 1982, Kneale made another one-off diversion from his usual work when he wrote his only produced Hollywood movie script, Halloween III: Season of the Witch. Kneale was approached by the director John Landis to work on the screenplay for a remake of Creature from the Black Lagoon, and Kneale and his wife spent some time living at the Sheraton Hotel in Hollywood while Kneale worked on the project. The Black Lagoon script never went into production, but while in America Kneale met the director Joe Dante, who invited him to script the third film in the Halloween series, on which Dante was working; Kneale agreed, on the proviso that it would be a totally new concept unrelated to the first two films, which he had not seen and he did not like what he had heard about them.

Kneale's treatment for the film met with the approval of John Carpenter, the producer of the Halloween series, although Kneale was required to write the script in six weeks. Kneale had a positive relationship with the director assigned to the film, Tommy Lee Wallace, but when one of the film's backers, Dino De Laurentiis, insisted upon the inclusion of more graphic violence and a rewrite of the script from Wallace, Kneale became displeased with the results and had his name removed from the film.

=== 1987–1995: Later ITV work ===
Kneale returned to writing scripts for British television, including Gentry with Roger Daltrey for ITV in 1987, and the 1989 adaptation of Susan Hill's novel The Woman in Black for transmission on ITV on Christmas Eve. Lynne Truss, reviewing a repeat broadcast of the production on Channel 4 for The Times in 1994, wrote that: "Clip-clop is not usually a noise to get upset about. But it will be an interesting test, today, to go up behind people and whisper 'clip-clop', to find out whether they saw The Woman in Black last night. People who made the bold decision to watch this excellent drama will respond to any 'clip-clop' by gratifyingly leaping in the air and grabbing the backs of their necks." The adaptation nearly went unmade; Kneale had written the script in ten days but been advised by his agent to wait before submitting it to the producers Central Independent Television so that they would not think he had rushed it. When he did submit the script three weeks later, he discovered that Central had been about to cancel the production as they had assumed that Kneale, then 67, had not been able to complete the work due to his age.

Susan Hill did not like some of the changes that Kneale had made to The Woman in Black. It has been observed that Kneale on some occasions operated a double standard with adaptations; being unhappy when others made changes to his stories, but willing to make changes to stories he was adapting into script form. Referring to The Woman in Black adaptation, the writer and critic Kim Newman noted that: "He was very offended at the notion of Susan Hill using the name of Kipps from HG Wells as the hero of The Woman in Black, and so he decided not to use it and to change the hero's name to Kidd. I'm sure if somebody thought that Quatermass was a silly name and changed it, he'd be furious!" However, Kneale's adaptations were not always unpopular with the original author. In 1991, a four-part version he wrote of Kingsley Amis's novel Stanley and the Women, met with approval from the original author, with Amis regarding it as the most successful adaptation of his work.

Kneale also adapted Sharpe's Gold for ITV in 1995, as part of their series of adaptations of Bernard Cornwell's Sharpe novels. This was an assignment that surprised his agent; "We didn't think he'd want to bother with them but he did. That was probably because he liked the producer." He returned to writing for radio for the first time since the 1950s in 1996, when he wrote the drama-documentary The Quatermass Memoirs for BBC Radio 3. Partly composed of Kneale looking back at the events that led to the writing of the original three Quatermass serials and using some archive material, there was also a dramatised strand to the series, set just before the ITV Quatermass serial and featuring Andrew Keir, star of the Hammer version of Quatermass and the Pit, as the Professor.

While recording an audio commentary for that film in 1997, Kneale speculated about a possible Quatermass prequel set in 1930s Germany. According to The Independent, Kneale conceived a storyline involving the young Quatermass becoming involved in German rocketry experiments in the 1930s, and helping a young Jewish woman to escape from the country during the 1936 Berlin Olympics.

=== 1995–2006: Final years ===
Kneale was invited to write for the successful American science fiction series The X-Files (1993–2002), but declined the offer. His final professional work was an episode of the ITV legal drama Kavanagh QC, starring John Thaw. Kneale's episode, "Ancient History", was about a Jewish woman who during the Second World War had been subjected to horrific experiments in a concentration camp.

Kneale continued to appear as an interview subject in various television documentaries, and also recorded further audio commentaries for the release of some of his productions on DVD. In 2005, he acted as a consultant when the digital television channel BBC Four produced a live remake of The Quatermass Experiment. He lived in Barnes, London, until his death on 29 October 2006 at the age of 84, following a series of small strokes.

== Legacy ==
When he joined BBC, Kneale was impressed with the state in which they found BBC television drama. However, he was frustrated at what he saw as the slow and boring styles of television drama production then employed, which he felt wasted the potential of the medium. Together with Cartier he would help revolutionise British television drama and establish it as an entity separate from its theatre and radio equivalents. Television historian Lez Cooke wrote in 2003 that "Between them, Kneale and Cartier were responsible for introducing a completely new dimension to television drama in the early to mid-1950s." Jason Jacobs, a lecturer in film and television studies at the University of Warwick, wrote: "It was the arrival of Nigel Kneale ... and Rudolph Cartier ... that challenged the intimate drama directly ... Kneale and Cartier shared a common desire to invigorate television with a faster tempo and a broader thematic and spatial canvas, and it was no coincidence that they turned to science-fiction in order to get out of the dominant stylistic trend of television intimacy."

The writer and actor Mark Gatiss indicated that Kneale was among the first rank of British television writers, but that this had been overlooked. "He is amongst the greats—he is absolutely as important as Dennis Potter, as David Mercer, as Alan Bleasdale, as Alan Bennett, but I think because of a strange snobbery about fantasy or sci-fi it's never quite been that way." The Guardian commented that "Kneale was by no means the only author to have been largely wasted by television, and to have seen his status overtaken by soap opera hacks. But his place is secure, alongside Wells, Arthur C. Clarke, John Wyndham and Brian Aldiss, as one of the best, most exciting and most compassionate English science fiction writers of his century." Writing about The Year of the Sex Olympics, Nancy Banks-Smith regarded Kneale as one of the few television writers whose work was particularly memorable. "At the name of Kneale, I feel, every knee should bow. How much TV do you remember from last night ... last year ... last century? Quite. Curiously, I can remember clearly the first time I saw The Year of the Sex Olympics by Nigel Kneale. It was 35 years ago."

Kneale was admired by the film director John Carpenter. The horror fiction writer Stephen King has cited Kneale as an influence, and Kim Newman suggested in 2003 that King had "more or less rewritten Quatermass and the Pit in The Tommyknockers." Other writers have named Kneale as an influence on their work including comics writer Grant Morrison and television screenwriter Russell T Davies, who described the Beasts episode "Baby" as "the most frightening thing I've ever seen ... Powerful stuff." Film screenwriter and director Dan O'Bannon was also an admirer of Kneale's writing, and in 1993 wrote a potential remake of The Quatermass Experiment, of which Kneale approved, but the film was never made. Other entertainment industry figures who publicly expressed admiration for Kneale's work include the Beatles' drummer Ringo Starr, members of the rock group Pink Floyd, and Monty Python's Flying Circus member Michael Palin.

Kneale never saw himself as a science fiction writer, and was often critical of the genre. He particularly disliked the BBC series Doctor Who (1963–89; 1996; 2005–present), for which he had once turned down an offer to write. The series was heavily influenced by Kneale's Quatermass serials, in some cases even using specific storylines that were similar to those from Quatermass. He also criticised Doomwatch and Blake's 7, describing the latter as the lowest point of British television science fiction.

== Family ==
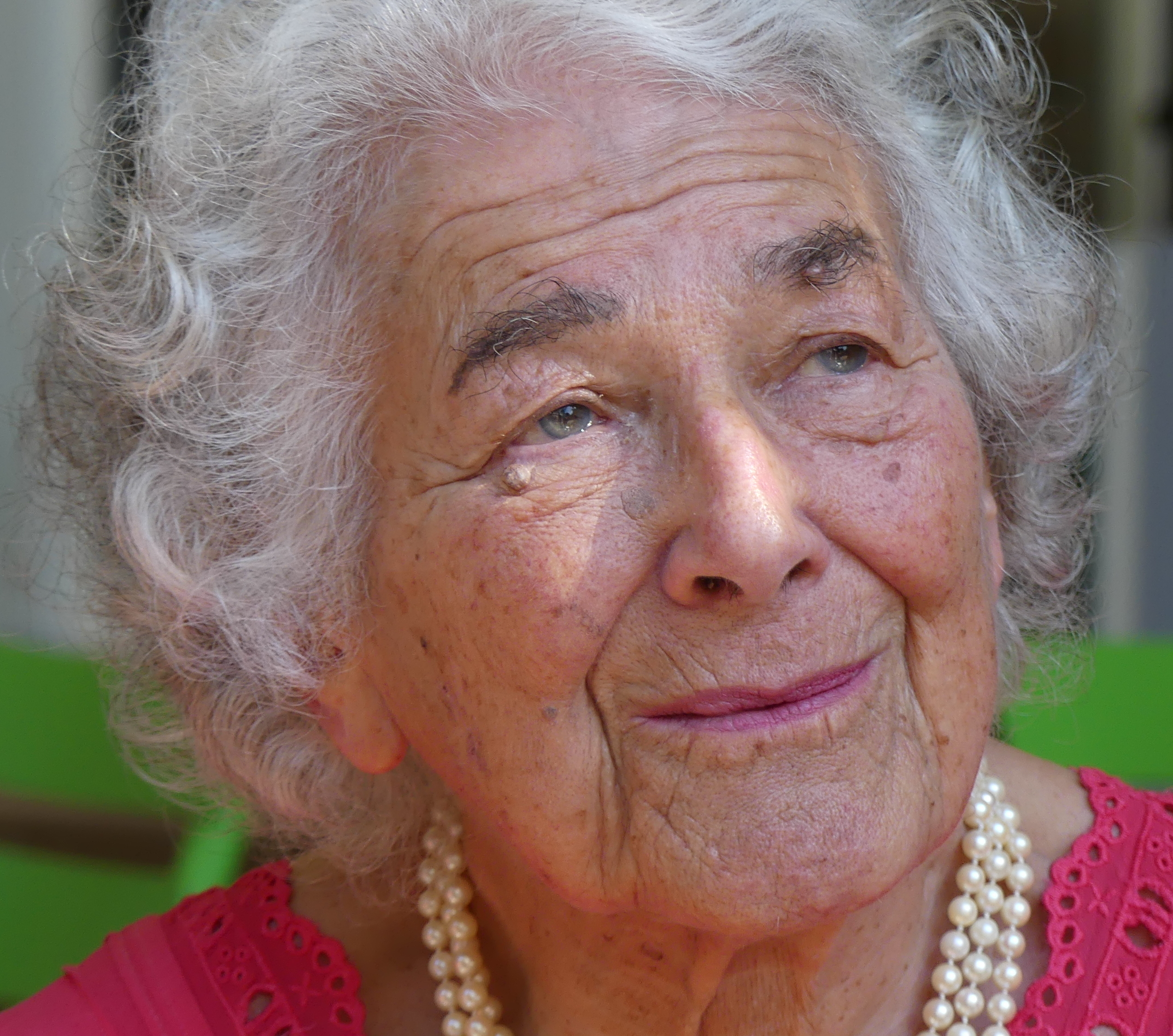
Kneale's wife Judith Kerr in 2016.

Kneale's younger brother is artist and sculptor Bryan Kneale, who was Master and then Professor of Sculpture at the Royal Academy from 1982 to 1990. He painted the covers for the Quatermass script books released by Penguin Books in 1959 and 1960. He was also responsible for a painting of a lobster from which special effects designers Bernard Wilkie and Jack Kine drew their inspiration for the Martian creatures they constructed for the original television version of Quatermass and the Pit.

In the early 1950s Kneale met fellow BBC screenwriter Judith Kerr, a Jewish refugee, in the BBC canteen. They married on 8 May 1954 and had two children; Matthew, who later became a successful novelist, and Tacy, an actress and later a special effects designer who worked on the Harry Potter film series.

Kerr became a successful children's writer, with the Mog series of books and When Hitler Stole Pink Rabbit, which was based on her own experiences of fleeing Nazi Germany in her youth. Kneale worked with Kerr on an adaptation of When Hitler Stole Pink Rabbit in the 1970s, but the eventual makers of the film version disregarded their script. Similarly, in 1995 Kneale scripted a four-part adaptation of one of Kerr's sequels to the book, A Small Person Far Away, but this also went unproduced.

== Filmography ==
- The Quatermass Xperiment (1955) - Story
- Quatermass 2 (1957) - Writer
- The Abominable Snowman (1957) - Writer
- Look Back in Anger (1959) - Writer
- The Entertainer (1960) - Writer
- H.M.S. Defiant (1962) - Writer
- First Men in the Moon (1964) - Writer
- The Witches (1966) - Writer
- Quatermass and the Pit (1967) - Writer
- The Stone Tape (1971) - Writer
- The Quatermass Conclusion (1979) - Writer
- Halloween III: Season of the Witch (1982) - Writer (uncredited)
- The Woman in Black (1989) - Writer
