= Seven Stories =

Museum and visitor centre in Newcastle, UK

Coordinates: 54°58′29″N 1°35′31″W

Seven Stories, the National Centre for Children's Books
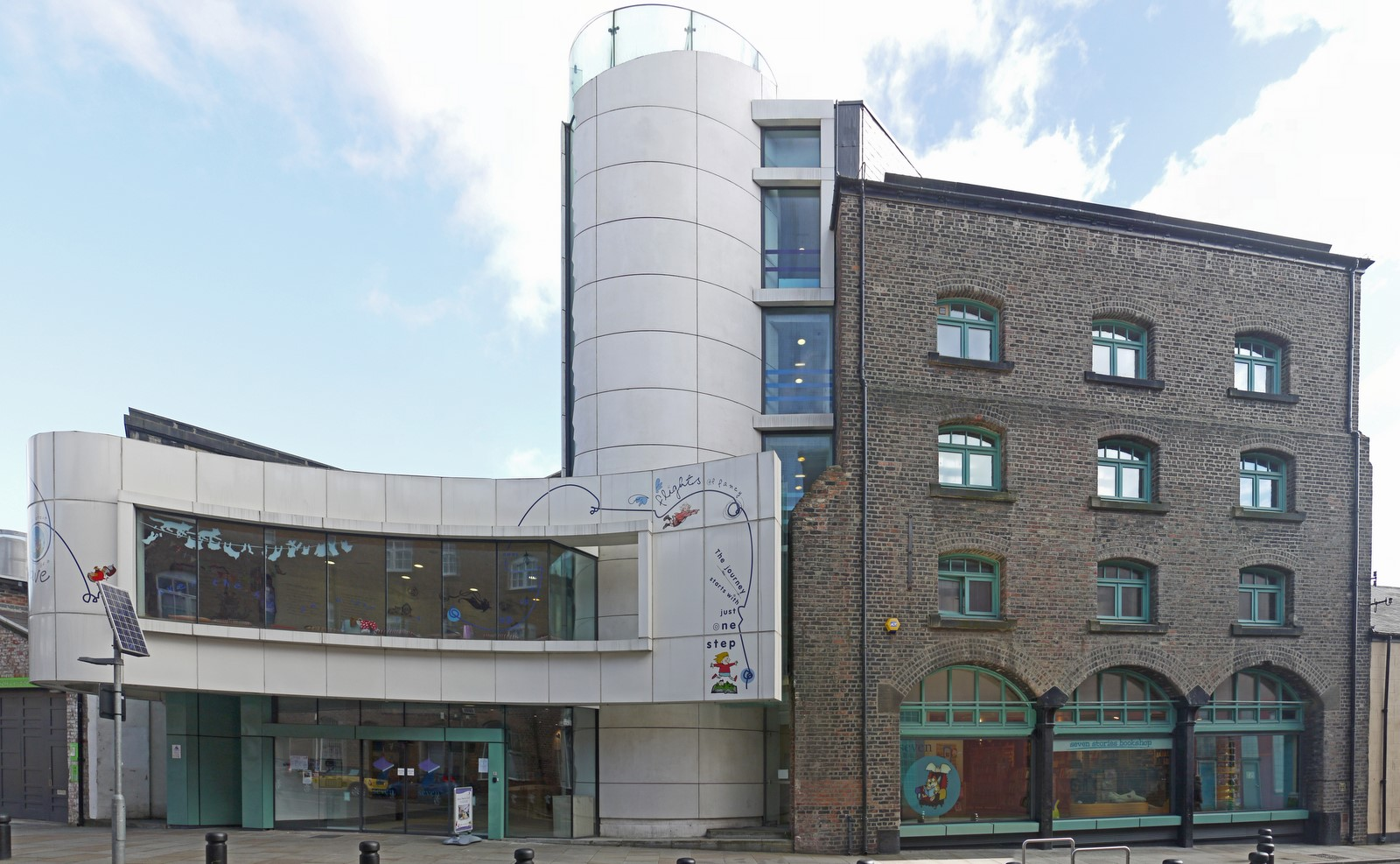
- The exterior of Seven Stories
- Established: 2005
- Location: Ouseburn Valley, Newcastle upon Tyne, England
- Type: Children's literature and illustration from 1930s to the present day
- Director: Wendy Elliot
- Public transit access: Manors, Byker (Tyne and Wear Metro)
- Website: www.sevenstories.org.uk

Seven Stories, the National Centre for Children's Books is a museum and visitor centre dedicated to children's literature and based in the Ouseburn Valley, Newcastle upon Tyne, close to the city's regenerated Quayside. The renovated Victorian mill in which it is housed has seven levels. It is the first and only museum in the UK wholly devoted to the art of British children's books. Their archive is housed in a separate building in Felling.

== History ==
Seven Stories opened in August 2005 after a £6.5 million conversion from a former granary building.

In March 2006, the centre received the Centre Vision Award, the Civic Trust's national award for best practice in town centre regeneration.

Seven Stories celebrated their fifth birthday in August 2010 with an exclusive golden ticket event with popular children's author Dame Jacqueline Wilson.

In September 2010, Seven Stories purchased several original typescripts by Enid Blyton, making Seven Stories the largest public collector of Blyton material. The purchase was made possible by special funding from the Heritage Lottery Fund, MLA/V&A Purchase Grant Fund, and two private donations.

In 2010, Seven Stories was awarded the Eleanor Farjeon Award, made for distinguished service to the world of British children's books.

In 2012, Seven Stories became The National Centre for Children's Books, a registered charity.

The centre closed for refurbishment in April 2015. The refurbishment was intended to focus on improving the visitor experience, functionality for school groups and the energy efficiency of the building. The centre re-opened on Sunday 19 July 2015.

In October 2015, author Michael Morpurgo donated a collection of manuscripts, notebooks and letters to the museum.

== Exhibits ==
Seven Stories has a changing programme of exhibitions aimed at both children and adults. Seven Stories brings together original manuscripts and illustrations from some of the UK's best loved children's books, to excite visitors in an exploration of creativity, literature and art. Jacqueline Wilson, Terry Jones, Philip Pullman and Quentin Blake are among some of the centre's most distinguished patrons.

Seven Stories curates its own exhibitions, many of which go on to tour nationally including Judith Kerr, Anthony Browne and Jacqueline Wilson. They also provide a range of workshops, visits and resources for schools and education professionals from pre-school to post graduates including the University of Newcastle upon Tyne with which it jointly hosts a number of PhD studentships funded by the Arts and Humanities Research Council.

Many children's authors and illustrators visit the centre to run workshops and give talks, including David Almond, Catherine Rayner, Michael Foreman, Terry Deary, Judith Kerr, Julia Donaldson, Mick Manning, Brita Granström and Oliver Jeffers.

Activities include dressing-up and dramatic fun, creative writing and wordplay, illustration and craft.

== See also ==
- Roald Dahl Museum and Story Centre
- The Story Museum
- Children's literature
