= Matthew Kneale =

British writer

Matthew Kneale (born 24 November 1960) is a British writer. He is best known for his 2000 novel English Passengers.

== Life ==
Kneale was born on 24 November 1960 in London, the son of screenwriter Nigel Kneale, and the children's writer Judith Kerr. He is also the grandson of Alfred Kerr, a German theatre critic and essayist, who as a dissident and critic of the Nazi Party was forced to flee Germany with his family in 1933. Matthew first accompanied his mother on a visit to Germany in 1967.

Kneale was brought up in Barnes, attended Latymer Upper School in West London, and then studied modern history at Magdalen College, Oxford. Growing up, he was fascinated by other cultures, past and present, and as a student he travelled in Europe, South America, Central America and the Indian subcontinent. After graduating he knew he wanted to write but had little idea how to set about such a thing. He traveled to Tokyo, where he found work teaching English and began writing a diary and short stories. Later, on returning to England, his experience in Japan inspired his first novel, Whore Banquets.

During the next few years Kneale lived primarily in London, travelled, spent a year in Rome, and wrote his second novel, Inside Rose's Kingdom. In 1990 he moved to Oxford, where he wrote two historical novels, Sweet Thames and English Passengers. He also developed an interest in languages, attempting to learn Spanish, Romanian, Albanian and Amharic (Ethiopian). In 2000 he married Shannon Russell and they moved to Italy and Shannon's homeland of Canada. He and his wife now live in Rome with their two children.

Kneale was elected a Fellow of the Royal Society of Literature in 2003.

== Work ==
Kneale's first novel, Whore Banquets, tells the story of an Englishman whose affair with a Tokyo woman brings him into the realm of Japanese organized crime. It won the 1988 Somerset Maugham Award and the 1988 Betty Trask Award. It was later republished as Mr Foreigner.

Inside Rose's Kingdom follows a young innocent who moves from the countryside to London, where he becomes caught up with a group of controlling, emotionally grasping people.

Sweet Thames is set in London in 1849 and tells the story of the trials of an enlightened drainage engineer whose wife vanishes during a cholera epidemic. It won the 1993 John Llewellyn Rhys Prize.

English Passengers tells the story of a religious-scientific expedition that seeks to find the Garden of Eden in Tasmania, a land whose aboriginal culture had been experiencing brutal destruction at the hands of British settlers and convicts. The novel is told by more than 20 voices. It won the 2000 Whitbread Book of the Year Award and was a finalist for the Booker Prize and the Australian Miles Franklin Award. In translation the book won France's Relay Prix d'Evasion. Interviewed in 2001, Kneale said that J. G. Farrell was a writer whom he particularly admired, as one who "wrote about the British Empire – and scathingly – back in the 1970s, when few in Britain wanted to think about the uglier parts of their country's past."

Small Crimes in an Age of Abundance is a volume of 12 short stories set around the world, from Colombia to London to Africa. They examine the lives of people as they struggled to survive and do the right thing, sometimes managing neither. One of the stories, "Powder", about a failed lawyer whose life changes when he chances upon a stash of cocaine and a mobile phone, was made into the French feature film, Une Pure Affaire.

When We Were Romans is told from the point of view of a boy, Laurence, whose mother suddenly and unexpectedly decides that she and her children, and even Laurence's hamster, must flee England to Rome, where she lived many years before.

An Atheist's History of Belief is Kneale's first nonfiction book. It looks at the beliefs that people have devised to explain their world, from earliest prehistoric times to the present, as understood by a fascinated non-believer. His second work of nonfiction, Rome: A History in Seven Sackings is a social and cultural history spanning centuries.

Pilgrims is a comic novel set in medieval times, mainly in 1289, about a group of heterogeneous individuals who band together on a journey from England to Rome on a religious pilgrimage, each with his or her own intentions.

The Rome Plague Diaries - Lockdown Life in the Eternal City is a non-fiction account of life during the Covid Pandemic lockdown of March - May 2020 which extends to a memoir of the author's two decades living in Rome, learning to understand the city and its inhabitants, and it even includes a few favourite recipes.

The Cameraman is a fictional account of a road journey across Europe to Rome, by Julius Sewell, a film cameraman who has been released from a mental hospital in Wales following a psychotic episode, together with his dysfunctional and politically extreme family. Set in the spring of 1934 the novel is set against the background of the rising spectre of Fascism and Nazism.

== Works ==
=== Fiction ===
- Whore Banquets, 1987 ISBN 0 575 03921 3
- Inside Rose's Kingdom, 1989 ISBN 0-575-04311-3
- Sweet Thames, 1992 ISBN 1 85619 181 8
- English Passengers, 2000
- Small Crimes in an Age of Abundance, 2005 ISBN 0-330-43534-5
- Powder, 2006
- When We Were Romans, 2007
- Pilgrims, 2020 ISBN 978-1-78649-237-1
- The Cameraman, 2023

=== Non-fiction ===
- An Atheist's History of Belief, 2013
- Rome: A History in Seven Sackings, 2017
- The Rome Plague Diaries: Lockdown Life in the Eternal City, 2021
