= The Rub of Time =

2017 book by Martin Amis

Front cover, first U.S. edition (2018)

Front cover, first U.K. edition (2017)

The Rub of Time: Bellow, Nabokov, Hitchens, Travolta, Trump: Essays and Reportage, 1994–2017 is a 2017 collection of non-fiction essays and criticism by the British author Martin Amis. It was his eighth nonfiction book and the final collection published during his lifetime.

The book was first published on 21 September 2017, by Jonathan Cape in the United Kingdom. Its initial title rendered the years covered as 1986–2016. The first United States edition, published by Knopf on 6 February 2018, added one essay and updated those years to 1994–2017. Later U.K. editions include the new essay but instead use 1994–2016.

== Summary ==
Like Visiting Mrs Nabokov: And Other Excursions (1993) and The War Against Cliché (2001), The Rub of Time collects Amis' reportage and criticism for newspapers and magazines in both the United States and the United Kingdom. The 45 essays are divided into groups by theme, including politics, sports, literature, the U.S., and the British royal family. Many are on the generation of male writers who came before him: Philip Roth, John Updike, Don DeLillo, Anthony Burgess, J. G. Ballard, Philip Larkin, and his father Kingsley Amis. All editions but the first include a 2017 Amis piece for Esquire titled "President Trump Orates in Ohio."

== Reception ==
The Rub of Time received generally positive reviews. In The New York Times, A. O. Scott wrote that "We can quibble about whether the ability to turn out a predetermined quantity of lucid, witty, sometimes moving, rarely boring prose on assignment and on deadline should be classified as a talent or a skill...What seems to me beyond argument is that Amis is good at it."

In The Guardian, Anne Enright wrote: "The Rub of Time is Amis at his considered best, witty, erudite and unafraid...The hierarchy thing, that need to revere older writers, may be a little bit male for some, but male is the way that Amis rolls."

In the Financial Times, Jon Day notes that Amis' "style, once so joyfully alive, has ossified slightly," but said the book includes "excellent essays on Nabokov and Bellow, the 'twin peaks' of Amis’s literary mountain range." Leo Robson in The New Statesman found Amis' literary criticism "tiresome, and all too predictable," but finds that his "brisk generalisations, nurtured for decades, lend themselves to potent writing. Certitude is the key to Amis’s superhuman flair — and what makes this collection so compelling."

The Sunday Times named The Rub of Time one of its 11 "Books of the Year" for 2017, calling it "erudite, eclectic and entertaining."

== Contents ==
=== By Way of an Introduction ===
- "He's Leaving Home" (The New Republic, 2012)

=== Twin Peaks 1 ===
- "Vladimir Nabokov and the Problem from Hell" (review of The Original of Laura, The Guardian, 2009)
- "Saul Bellow, as Opposed to Henry James" (The Atlantic, 2003)

=== Politics 1 ===
- "The Republican Party in 2011: Iowa" (Newsweek, 2011)
- "The Republican Party in 2012: Tampa, Florida" (Newsweek, 2012)
- "The Republican Party in 2016: Trump" (Harper's, 2016)

=== Literature 1 ===
- "Philip Larkin: His Work and Life" (introduction to Philip Larkin Poems, 2011)
- "Larkin's Letters to Monica" (The Guardian, 2011)
- "Iris Murdoch: Age Will Win" (review of Richard Eyre's film Iris, Talk, 2001)

=== The House of Windsor ===
- "Princess Diana: A Mirror, Not a Lamp" (Time, 1997)
- "The Queen's Speech, the Queen's Heart" (The New Yorker, 2002)

=== More Personal 1 ===
- "You Ask the Questions 1" (The Independent, 2001)
- "The Fourth Estate and the Puzzle of Heredity" (The Guardian, 2010)
- "On the Road: The Multicity Book Tour" (The New Yorker, 1995)
- "The King's English" (on Kingsley Amis' The King's English: A Guide to Modern Usage, The Guardian, 2011)

=== Twin Peaks 2 ===
- "Bellow's Lettres" (review of Saul Bellow's There Is Simply Too Much to Think About, The New York Times Book Review, 2015)
- "Nabokov's Natural Selection" (review of Brian Boyd's Stalking Nabokov, The Times Literary Supplement, 2011)

=== Americana (Stepping Westward) ===
- "Losing in Las Vegas" (The Sunday Times, 2006)
- "Travolta's Second Act" (The New Yorker, 1995)
- "In Pornoland: Pussies Are Bullshit" (Talk, 2000)

=== Literature 2 ===
- "Don DeLillo: Laureate of Terror" (review of The Angel Esmeralda: Nine Stories, The New Yorker, 2011)
- "J. G. Ballard: From Outer Space to Inner Space" (The Guardian, 2009)
- "Early Ballard: The Drowned World" (The Guardian, 2012)
- "The Shock of the New: A Clockwork Orange Turns Fifty" (The New York Times Book Review, 2012)

=== Sport ===
- "Three Stabs at Tennis" (The New Yorker, 1994, 1996, 1997)
- "The Champions League Final, 1999" (The Observer, 1999)
- "In Search of Dieguito Maradona" (The Guardian, 2004)
- "On the Court: My Beautiful Game" (The Guardian, 2009)

=== More Personal 2 ===
- "Deciding to Write Time's Arrow" (The Guardian, 2010)
- "Marty and Nick Jr. Sail to America" (The New York Times, 2012)
- "You Ask the Questions 2" (The Independent, 2007)

=== Politics 2 ===
- "Ivan Is Introduced to the USSR: All Together Now" (review of Mark D. Steinberg's Voices of Revolution 1917, The Times Literary Supplement, 2002)
- "Is Terrorism 'About Religion'?" (The Wall Street Journal, 2008)
- "In Memory of Neda Soltan, 1983–2009: Iran" (The Guardian, 2009)
- "The Crippled Murderers of Cali, Colombia" (The Sunday Times, 2005)

=== Literature 3 ===
- "Philip Roth Finds Himself" (review of Claudia Roth Pierpont's Roth Unbound: A Writer and His Books, The New York Times Book Review, 2013)
- "Roth the Elder: A Moralistic Investigation" (review of Philip Roth's The Dying Animal, Talk, 2001)
- "John Updike's Farewell Notes" (review of John Updike's My Father's Tears and Other Stories, The Guardian, 2009)
- "Rabbit Angstrom Confronts Obamacare" (Areté, 2009)
- "Jane Austen and the Dream Factory" (The New Yorker, 1997)

=== More Personal 3 ===
- "Christopher Hitchens" (The Observer, 2010)

=== Politics 3 ===
- "On Jeremy Corbyn, Leader of Her Majesty's Opposition" (The Sunday Times, 2015)
- "President Trump Orates in Ohio" (Esquire, 2017)

=== Twin Peaks 3 ===
- "Bellow: Avoiding the Void" (review of Zachary Leader's The Life of Saul Bellow: To Fame and Fortune, 1915–1964, Vanity Fair, 2015)
- "Véra and Vladimir: Letters to Véra" (review of Vladimir Nabokov's Letters to Véra, The New York Times Book Review, 2015)

== See also ==
- The Moronic Inferno: And Other Visits to America (1986)
- Visiting Mrs Nabokov: And Other Excursions (1993)
- The War Against Cliché (2001)
