= Time's Arrow (novel) =

Book by Martin Amis

Time's Arrow: or The Nature of the Offence
- First edition
- Author: Martin Amis
- Language: English
- Publisher: Jonathan Cape
- Publication date: 1991
- Publication place: United Kingdom
- Media type: Print (hardback & paperback)
- Pages: 165 pp
- ISBN: 0-224-03093-0
- OCLC: 25747026
- Preceded by: London Fields (novel)
- Followed by: The Information (novel)

Time's Arrow: or The Nature of the Offence (1991) is a novel by Martin Amis. It was shortlisted for the Booker Prize in 1991. It is notable partly because the events occur in a reverse chronology, with time passing in reverse and the main character becoming younger and younger during the novel.

== Plot summary ==
The novel recounts the life of a German Holocaust doctor in reverse chronology. The narrator, together with the reader, experiences time passing in reverse. The narrator is not exactly the protagonist himself but a secondary consciousness apparently living within him, feeling his feelings but with no access to his thoughts and no control over events. Some passages may be interpreted as hinting that this narrator may in some way be the conscience, but this is not clear. The narrator may alternatively be considered merely a necessary device to narrate a reverse chronology.

Amis engages in several forms of reverse discourse including reverse dialogue, reverse narrative, and reverse explanation. Amis's use of these techniques is aimed to create an unsettling and irrational aura for the reader; indeed, one of the recurrent themes in the novel is the narrator's persistent misinterpretation of events. For example, he simply accepts that people wait for an hour in a physician's waiting room after being examined, although at some points he has doubts about this tradition. Relationships are portrayed with stormy beginnings that slowly fade into pleasant romances. Although the narrator accepts all this, he is puzzled and feels that the world does not really make sense.

The reverse narrative begins in America, where the doctor is first living in retirement and then practicing medicine. He is always fearful of something and does not want to be too conspicuous. Later he changes his identity and moves to New York. (Considering the story forward, he escaped Europe after the war and succeeded in settling in America, with the assistance of a Reverend Nicholas Kreditor who apparently assists war criminals in hiding.) In 1948 he travels (in reverse) to Portugal, from where he makes his way to Auschwitz.

The doctor, Odilo Unverdorben, assists "Uncle Pepi" (modelled on Josef Mengele) in his torture and murder of Jews. While at Auschwitz, the reverse chronology means that he creates life and heals the sick, rather than the opposite.

What tells me that this is right? What tells me that all the rest was wrong? Certainly not my aesthetic sense. I would never claim that Auschwitz-Birkenau-Monowitz was good to look at. Or to listen to, or to smell, or to taste, or to touch. There was, among my colleagues there, a general though desultory quest for greater elegance. I can understand that word, and all its yearning: elegant. Not for its elegance did I come to love the evening sky above the Vistula, hellish red with the gathering souls. Creation is easy. Also ugly. Hier ist kein warum. Here there is no why. Here there is no when, no how, no where. Our preternatural purpose? To dream a race. To make a people from the weather. From thunder and from lightning. With gas, with electricity, with shit, with fire. (pp. 119–120, Vintage edition, 1992)

In the reversed version of reality, not only is simple chronology reversed (people become younger, and eventually become children, then babies, and then re-enter their mothers' wombs, where they finally cease to exist) but so is morality. Blows heal injuries, doctors cause them. Theft becomes donation, and vice versa. In a passage about prostitutes, doctors harm them while pimps give them money and heal them.

== Background ==
Amis first thought up the idea of telling a man's life backwards in time two years before the novel was published. He found a fertile ground for that structure when his friend Robert Jay Lifton gave him a copy of his book, The Nazi Doctors, about the involvement of German doctors in World War II, from Action T4 to the extermination camps. The alternative title for the novel is taken from Primo Levi's The Truce:

So for us even the hour of liberty rang out grave and muffled, and filled our souls with joy and yet with a painful sense of pudency, so that we would have liked to wash our consciences and our memories clean from the foulness that lay upon them; and also with anguish, because we felt that this should never happen, that now nothing could ever happen good and pure enough to rub out our past, and that the scars of the outrage would remain within us forever... Because, and this is the awful privilege of our generation and of my people, no one better than us has ever been able to grasp the incurable nature of the offense, that spreads like a contagion. It is foolish to think that human justice can eradicate it.

Amis also mentioned the critical influence of If This Is a Man, The Drowned and the Saved, and Moments of Reprieve. The afterword to Time's Arrow acknowledged the book's debt to a passage about the Dresden firebombing in Kurt Vonnegut's Slaughterhouse Five, in which the protagonist, Billy Pilgrim, experiences the bombing in reverse chronological order.

== Themes and structure ==
=== Reverse chronology ===
According to Amis's autobiography the story is narrated by the soul of Odilo.

== Bibliography ==
- Adami, Valentina. Trauma Studies and Literature: Martin Amis's Time's Arrow as Trauma Fiction. Frankfurt: Peter Lang, 2008.
- Brendle, Jeffrey. "Forward to the Past: History and the Reversed Chronology Narrative in Martin Amis's Time's Arrow". The American Journal of Semiotic 12.1 (1995): 425–445.
- Easterbrook, Neil. "'I know that it is to do with trash and shit, and that it is wrong in time': Narrative Reversal in Martin Amis's Time's Arrow". Conference of College Teachers of English (CCTE) Studies 55 (1995): 52–61.
- Głaz, Adam. “The self in time: Reversing the irreversible in Martin Amis's Time’s Arrow”. Journal of Literary Semantics 35.2 (2006): 105–122.
- Harris, Greg. "Men Giving Birth to New World Orders: Martin Amis's Time's Arrow". Studies in the Novel 31.4 (1999): 489–505.
- Joffe, Phil. "Language Damage: Nazis and Naming in Martin Amis's Time's Arrow". Nomina Africana 9.2 (1995): 1–10.
- Marta, Jan. "Postmodernizing the Literature-and-Medicine Canon: Self-Conscious Narration, Unruly Texts, and the Viae Ruptae of Narrative Medicine". Literature and Medicine 16.1 (1997): 43–69.
- McCarthy, Dermot. "The Limits of Irony: the Chronillogical World of Martin Amis's Time's Arrow". War, Literature, and the Arts 11.1 (1999): 294–320.
- Menke, Richard. "Narrative Reversal and the Thermodynamics of History in Martin Amis's Time's Arrow". Modern Fiction Studies 44.4 (1998): 959–80.
- Slater, Maya. "Problems when Time Moves Backwards: Martin Amis's Time's Arrow". English: The Journal of the English Association 42.173 (1993): 141–52.
- Vice, Sue. "Formal Matters: Martin Amis, Time's Arrow". In Vice, Sue. Holocaust Fiction. London, New York: Routledge, 2000, pp. 11–37.
