= Einstein's Monsters =

Book by Martin Amis

- First edition
- Author: Martin Amis
- Cover artist: Bruegel; The Tower of Babel
- Language: English
- Publisher: Jonathan Cape
- Publication date: 30 Apr 1987
- Media type: Print (hardback & paperback)
- Pages: 127
- ISBN: 0-224-02435-3

Einstein's Monsters (1987) is a collection of short stories by British writer Martin Amis. Each of the five stories deals with the subject of nuclear weapons.

== Contents ==
Einstein's Monsters consists of five thematically-linked short stories prefaced by a long introductory essay titled "Thinkability". (Amis includes another essay on nuclear weapons in his collection Visiting Mrs. Nabokov, "Nuclear City: The Megadeath Intellectuals". It was written during the publication year of Einstein's Monsters and covers similar ground: "When nuclear weapons become real to you, when they stop buzzing around your ears and actually move into your head, hardly an hour passes without some throb or flash, some heavy pulse of imagined supercatastrophe.")

The five stories are:

- "Bujak and the Strong Force, or God's Dice"
- "Insight at Flame Lake"
- "The Time Disease"
- "The Little Puppy That Could"
- "The Immortals"

Two of these stories, "Bujak" and "The Little Puppy", were later published together as the collection God's Dice (1995) in the Penguin 60s series.

== Introduction and stories ==
=== "Thinkability" ===
The book is introduced with an essay entitled "Thinkability", where Amis argues that many previous efforts at writing about nuclear warfare are flawed (with the notable exceptions of Jonathan Schell's The Fate of the Earth and The Abolition) because they presume that the damages of nuclear warfare can be placed into proportion and therefore debated about, mitigated, even justified. Amis contends that the magnitude of nuclear warfare is so inconceivable that such presumption is immoral and "subhuman", and that writers are only beginning to learn how to write about them properly. (He writes: "My impression is that the subject resists frontal assault.")

=== "The Immortals" ===
The story is told from the first person point of view of a being who is immortal and has existed for millions of years. The narrative of the story consists of the story of the development of the earth including the evolution of all life including humans and the history of the human race through nuclear Armageddon and the end of human life on earth. This narrative is interspersed with a narrative of the narrator’s interaction with the world including humans and a pet elephant that lived a hundred years and his satiric, snobbish evaluation of various time periods or people. In reality, the whole story is the imaginings of one of a group of people living by a polluted well in New Zealand at the end of the world; all of these imagine themselves to be immortal when in reality they are dying. The narrator, an ultimately unreliable narrator, acknowledges that this is the case with the others at the well, but that he really is immortal.
