= Invasion of the Space Invaders =

1982 nonfiction book by Martin Amis

Invasion of the Space Invaders: An Addict's Guide to Battle Tactics, Big Scores and the Best Machines
- Author: Martin Amis
- Subject: Video gaming
- Publisher: Hutchinson
- Publication date: September 1982
- Publication place: United Kingdom
- Pages: 128
- ISBN: 978-0-09-147841-4

Invasion of the Space Invaders: An Addict's Guide to Battle Tactics, Big Scores and the Best Machines is a 1982 non-fiction book on video games by the British author Martin Amis. The foreword is by American filmmaker Steven Spielberg, also an arcade game enthusiast.

Written during what has been called the golden age of arcade video games, the book comprises three parts: a survey of the 1980s arcade scene in New York City, London, Paris and elsewhere, with Amis's musings on video games as a phenomenon; strategy guides with tips and tricks for 20 prominent games, including Space Invaders, Defender and Pac-Man; and a look to the future with the impending arrival of home gaming. Amis's fascination and enthusiasm for his subject are apparent, but he does strike an admonishing tone at times, even going so far as to say that video gaming is "morally ambiguous". Contrary to some claims, Amis never "disowned" the book, despite its great dissimilarity to the rest of his oeuvre.

Originally published by Hutchinson, it was allowed to go out of print; as a result, second-hand copies were able to command "stratospheric" prices until Jonathan Cape republished it in 2018. Edge noted in 2005 copies were going for US$169 on Amazon.

== Background ==
Martin Amis wrote Invasion of the Space Invaders concurrently with his 1984 novel Money.

== Publication ==
Invasion of the Space Invaders: An Addict's Guide to Battle Tactics, Big Scores and the Best Machines was first published in September 1982 by Hutchinson. The book would eventually go out of print, resulting in high prices in the second-hand market.

== Reception ==
The Video Game Update recommended the book, calling it "the coffee table book for the video generation" in a 1983 review. Garrie Hutchinson for The Sydney Morning Herald praised Amis for writing his personal view of gaming, calling it an excellent user guide. Writing in The Village Voice, U.S. author Paul Collins described the book as "completely endearing in its utter dorkiness", while English writer and videogame enthusiast Simon Parkin in The Guardian described it as "a valuable snapshot of early critical thinking about video games". Sam Derboo's review for Hardcore Gaming 101 considered the narrative to be "proto New Games Journalism".
