= Inside Story =

Inside Story may refer to:

== Literature ==
- Inside Story (novel), a 2020 novel by Martin Amis

== Music ==
- Inside Story (Grace Jones album), 1986
- Inside Story (Lalaine album)
- Inside Story (Prince Lasha album)
- The Inside Story (album), a 1979 album by Robben Ford
- "Inside Story", a 1988 song by Little River Band from the album Monsoon

== Film ==
- Inside Story (film), a 1939 American film
- The Inside Story (film), 1948 American film

== Television ==
- Inside Story (Australian TV program)
- Inside Story (TV programme), on Al Jazeera English and Al Jazeera America
- The Inside Story (Philippine TV series)
- "The Inside Story" (Rugrats)
