= The Rachel Papers (novel) =

1973 book by Martin Amis

- First UK edition
- Author: Martin Amis
- Cover artist: Keith Davis
- Language: English
- Genre: Fiction
- Publisher: Knopf (US); Jonathan Cape (UK)
- Publication date: 1973
- Publication place: England
- Pages: 223
- ISBN: 0394491432

The Rachel Papers is Martin Amis's first novel, published in 1973 by Jonathan Cape.

== Plot ==
The Rachel Papers tells the story of Charles Highway, a bright, egotistical teenager (a portrait Amis acknowledges as autobiographical) and his relationship with his girlfriend in the year before going to university. Narrated by Charles on the eve of his twentieth birthday, the novel recounts Charles's last year of adolescence and his first love, Rachel Noyes, whom he meets in London while studying for his entrance exams into Oxford. Charles meets Rachel at a party and vows to win her over with his wit and wisdom. Unfortunately, she is seeing an American visiting student named DeForest, and Charles must employ a variety of meticulously calculated schemes to steal her away.

The title is an allusion to one subset of notes that Charles works on diligently throughout the novel – detailed instructions on everything from how to convince his Oxford don of his brilliance, to how to pick up and seduce girls. Instead of studying for his exams, Charles pours most of his time into these narcissistic chronicles, and after he meets Rachel, "The Rachel Papers" become the primary outlet for his neurotic brilliance. Gradually these notes evolve beyond a set of conniving machinations geared toward getting Rachel into bed with him, and into a sincere story of their brief but passionate romance.

== Themes ==
As the title indicates, writing is one of the main themes of the novel, but Amis's protagonist is a parody of the novelist writing about the writing process itself. Charles Highway is obsessed with literature and literariness, as evidenced by the fact that he continually peppers his narrative with references to great poets and novelists, most notably William Blake. He is equally obsessed with adding a literary flair to his life, not just by hyperbolically comparing himself to figures like Blake and Keats, but by working the people and events of his life into his elaborate system of notes, essays, and diaries, among which "The Rachel Papers" become central. He is so thoroughly engrossed in and delighted by this artificially constructed world that he is incapable of having genuine human relationships – besides Rachel, the only other person he is close to, his one friend Geoffrey, is constantly high on a cocktail of drugs and alcohol.

While his intense self-awareness at times allows Charles to be cannily poignant and honest about sensitive subjects (his troubled relationship with his philandering father, his sister's dysfunctional marriage, the awkwardness of adolescent romance), his precociousness and narcissism also blinds him to a great deal of his own faults and shortcomings.

== Critical reception ==
Amis's first novel received mixed critical reception. While he was praised by some critics for his "ruthlessly brilliant comedy", he was also taken to task for failing to sufficiently animate any of the other characters besides Charles, making the book merely "an easy-reading, mildly funny series of bed-and-bathroom observations." Nevertheless, in 1974 The Rachel Papers won the Somerset Maugham Award for best novel by a writer under the age of thirty-five.

== Amis on The Rachel Papers ==
In preparing to write his 2010 novel The Pregnant Widow, Amis revealed that he re-read The Rachel Papers for research purposes (as "the time frame is similar").

Amis's view of his debut novel diminished considerably in his later years. Regarding what he made of the novel upon re-reading it, Amis remarked in a 2010 interview that, by his high standards the novel "seemed crude...Not the writing. That was terribly alive. The craft. The sex. The setups… [were] all incredibly cack-handed." In a subsequent later appearance at the Sunday Times Literary Festival in March 2010, he criticised his debut further, stating, "A first novel is about energy and originality, but to me now it looks so crude. I don't mean bad language – it's so clumsily put together. The sense of decorum, the slowing a sentence down, the scrupulousness I feel I have acquired, aren't there. As you get older, your craft, the knack of knowing what goes where, what goes when, is much more acute."

== Film version ==
In 1989, the book was made into a film of the same name, starring Dexter Fletcher and Ione Skye.
