= Starters with Mocktales =

2012 travel story collection

Starters with Mocktales (27 lazy tales for relaxed reading)
- Cover page of print edition
- Author: Aditya Krishnan
- Language: English
- Genre: Travel, short stories, young adults
- Published: 24 June 2012 Soul Power Magic
- Media type: Print (paperback); Ebook
- Pages: 234 (paperback); 166 (ebook)
- ISBN: 978-0-9847563-5-3 (paperback edition)

Starters with Mocktales is a 2012 travel book by Indian author Aditya Krishnan (Hindi: अदित्या क्रिशन्न; born 24 June 1997). The book was released online via Amazon.com on 24 June 2012 as an ebook and subsequently also sold as a paperback. Starters with Mocktales includes 16 travel stories, 3 fictional short stories and 8 literary nonfiction stories.

Krishnan gained international recognition when the ebook was ranked number 1 in multiple sections of the Amazon Kindle store, and reached the Top 800 Bestselling list overall worldwide. With the launch of the book, Krishnan announced that a significant portion of the book's profits would be donated to a charity.

The book is split up into 4 sections: Short Stories, Back in Singapore, Move to Mumbai and Arrive at Singapore. All the titles refer to events in Krishnan's life in reverse chronological order with the exception of Short Stories.

== Reception ==
Starters with Mocktales received high rankings in both its Amazon Kindle page, as well as on the popular book sharing website, Goodreads.

On 3 September 2012, The Hindu, an Indian national newspaper, released their book review on Krishnan's book on their website, and printed the article in the Young World section of The Hindu newspaper on 4 September 2012. The article about Starters with Mocktales, featured an exclusive interview with Krishnan.

The average ranking for the book on Amazon Kindle is 4.8 out of 5 stars, while the average on Goodreads is the maximum 5 out of 5 stars. In Goodreads, the most popular 'shelf' for the book was "to-read".

== Contents ==
=== Short stories ===
- Fresh Off the Boat
- Feet of Clay
- Listening Out of the Box

=== Back in Singapore ===
- Rolling Hills
- NYAA
- Super Strings!
- Writers’ Fortnight
- Community Clean Up
- The Funny Guy
- The Colours of United Nations Night
- The Spirit of Global Concerns Week
- BBC Knowledge Challenge

=== Move to Mumbai ===
- Seas of Sand, Beaches of Knowledge
- The European Extravaganza
- The News Behind A Newspaper
- The City of Gates
- Reach Out
- Mourning the Death of a Language
- Caves of a Single Rock
- Carving Basalt
- ReConnect's First Expedition

=== Arrive at Singapore ===
- The Greatest Trip to the Zoo
- The Enchanting Colours of Pulau Tioman
- Go Dark Green
- How I Conquered the Ropes Course
- Expressions of Tamen Negara
- Tremendous Tokyo
