= Jenn Ashworth =

English writer

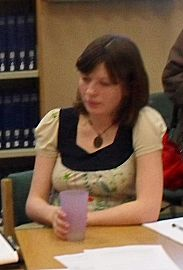
- Jenn Ashworth at a creative writing workshop in Ashton under Lyne, May 2010.
- Born: 1982 (age 43–44); Preston, Lancashire, England
- Education: Cambridge University, Manchester Centre for New Writing
- Occupations: Short story writer, novelist, professor
- Writing career
- Language: English
- Notable works: A Kind of Intimacy, Cold Light, The Friday Gospels, Fell
- Website: jennashworth.co.uk

Jenn Ashworth FRSL is an English writer born in 1982 in Preston, Lancashire. In June 2018 Ashworth was elected Fellow of the Royal Society of Literature in its "40 Under 40" initiative.

== Education ==
At the age of 11 Ashworth informed her parents that she did not want to go to school, in a behaviour commonly called school refusal. At 13 she was sent to pupil referral unit Larches House which she enjoyed attending; but her placement there ended early after Ashworth was told she would only be allowed to go for one term, and she declined to carry on attending. She eventually returned to mainstream school and after completing her A-Levels, studied English literature at Newnham College, Cambridge, followed by an MA in creative writing at Manchester University's Centre for New Writing in 2006.

== Career ==
Ashworth started her career as a librarian, working in Oxford University's Bodleian Library and then in the public library sector, specialising in reader development and writing industries. From 2008 to 2010 she worked as a prison librarian in Lancashire, based in a male category B prison. It was during this time that she started her second novel, Cold Light, writing it in her car during her lunch breaks. Ashworth then became a freelance writer but continued her interest in writing development by setting up the Lancashire Writing Hub and other projects in the north west such as The Writing Smithy; a literary consultancy which she ran with the poet Sarah Hymas. She also held the post of Research Fellow at the University of Manchester and in 2011 began lecturing at Lancaster University's Department of English and creative writing. In March 2011 she was featured as one of the BBC Culture Show's Best 12 New Novelists.

== Writing ==
=== Early novels ===
Two early novels by Ashworth remain unpublished. One was written by her at the age of 17, while another was lost as a result of a computer theft in 2004. However, an extract from this lost novel was the winner of the 2003 Quiller-Couch Prize for Creative Writing at Cambridge University.

=== A Kind of Intimacy ===
Ashworth has written both short stories and longer works. Her first novel A Kind of Intimacy, was developed during her time studying creative writing at Manchester University and was published in February 2009 by Arcadia. It tells the story of Annie, a lonely woman failing to come to grips with reality, unable to relate to others and full of self-deception. The story contains strong elements of both comedy and tragedy which ultimately culminates in violence. The novel won a Betty Trask Award from The Society of Authors in 2010.

=== Cold Light ===
Ashworth's 2011 novel Cold Light aims, according to her own account, to be "dark and funny and odd". The novel tells the story of three teenage girls, one of whom has died with her boyfriend in suspicious circumstances. The novel is set on the tenth anniversary of the death, when a memorial summerhouse is built and another body is found. Once again Ashworth's writing explores the dark side of human emotions with reviewer Anita Sethi writing in The Independent that "Its insidious and unsettling power resides in the tension created by opposites. The tenderness and delicacy of the 14-year-old girl is juxtaposed with a capacity for great brutality."

=== The Friday Gospels ===
In 2013, a third novel, The Friday Gospels, was published, this time focusing on a Lancastrian family, welcoming their son home from a two-year mission for the Church of Jesus Christ of Latter-day Saints (LDS Church). Ashworth was herself brought up as member of the LDS Church, but left the church in her teens.

=== Curious Tales ===
Ashworth founded the publishing writing and art collective, Curious Tales, in 2013.

=== Fell ===
A fourth novel, Fell, was published by Sceptre in 2016. The Guardian described it as a "dark, compelling tale" where the "past and present mingle."

=== Notes Made While Falling ===
Published by Goldsmiths Press, November 2019, it has been described as a "genre-bending memoir and a cultural study of traumatized and sickened selves in fiction and film."

=== Ghosted ===
A fifth novel, Ghosted, was issued in the summer of 2021.

== Works ==
Short Stories

- "Some Girls Are Bigger Than Others" - Paint a Vulgar Picture: Fiction Inspired by the Smiths (Serpent's Tail, 2009, ISBN 978-1846686498)
- "The Wrong Sort of Shoes" – Bugged: Writings from Overhearings ( CompletelyNovel.com, 2010, ISBN 978-1849140539)
- "Hammer" – Jawbreakers: 2012 National Flash-Fiction Day Anthology (CreateSpace Independent Publishing, 2014, ISBN 978-1501037832)
- "Every Member a Missionary" – MIR9 The Mechanics' Institute Review, Issue 9 (MA Creative Writing, 2012, ISBN 978-0954793395)
- "Shoes" – Scraps: A collection of flash-fictions from National Flash-Fiction Day 2013 (Gumbo Press, 2013, 978–0957271340)
- "Katy, My Sister" – Short Fiction Journal, Vol. 7 (2013, ISSN 1755-3474)
- "Dark Jack" – The Longest Night: Five Curious Tales (Curious Tales, 2013)
- "Doted" – Transatlantic: The Litro Anthology (Ocean Media, 2014)
- "Dinner For One" – Poor Souls' Light: Seven Curious Tales (Curious Tales, 2014)
- The Badger(Ration books, 2022)
- "The Hanging Stones" - Bog People - A working class anthology of folk hirror (Penguin, 2025)

Novels

- A Kind of Intimacy (Arcadia Books, 2009, ISBN 978-1906413392)
- Cold Light (Sceptre, 2011, ISBN 978-1444721447)
- The Friday Gospels (Sceptre, 2013, ISBN 978-1444707724)
- Fell (Sceptre, 2016, ISBN 978-1473630604)

Radio commissions

- Five Thousand Lads a Year – Commissioned by BBC Radio 4 for Friday Firsts

Newspaper Articles

- "Why I refused to go to school" – The Guardian, 13 January 2012
- "Under my skin: Why are so many women getting tattoos? Jenn Ashworth on the appeal of permanent markings" – The Guardian, 14 December 2013
- "Generation rental: the housing crisis facing today's youth" – The Observer, 16 March 2014

Book Contributions

- Chapter on Amy Levy, poet and feminist – Breaking Bounds: Six Newnham Lives (Newham College, 2014, ISBN 978-0993071508)
- Chapter – Writing Short Stories (Bloomsbury, 2014, ISBN 978-1408130803)
- Chapter – The Aart of the Novel (Salt Publishing, 2015, ISBN 978-1907773655)
