= Inside Story (novel) =

2020 novel by Martin Amis

- Author: Martin Amis
- Language: English
- Genre: Autobiographical fiction
- Publisher: Jonathan Cape
- Publication date: 24 September 2020
- Pages: 560
- ISBN: 978-0-593-31829-4
- Dewey Decimal: 823/.914 21

Inside Story is an autobiographical novel by the English author Martin Amis, published in 2020. It was Amis' final novel to be published before his death in 2023.

== Synopsis ==
The book revolves around a fictionalized account of Amis' relationship with three central figures who have died: Philip Larkin, Saul Bellow and Christopher Hitchens. Another central figure, Phoebe Phelps, is entirely fictional, and characterized by a mixture of hyper-sexuality and vulnerability reminiscent of previous female characters written by Amis (e.g. Nicola Six in London Fields, Gloria Prettyman in The Pregnant Widow). The novel begins with Amis welcoming the reader into his home. It is interspersed with sections in which Amis addresses the reader directly and discusses the art of writing. The final part of the novel describes the death of each of the three principal figures (Larkin, Bellow, Hitchens), followed by Amis himself bidding farewell to the reader.

== Development ==
Amis first attempted to write a second memoir (his first being Experience) during his stay in Uruguay, between 2003 and 2006. It was provisionally called Life. In 2005, having written about 100,000 words, he read the manuscript and decided it was "dead". He eventually developed a 30-page section of it which he did like into The Pregnant Widow, and abandoned the project for several years. He was moved to try it again following the death of Christopher Hitchens: "when Christopher died I thought, 'Christ, they're all dead now'. I mean, Saul, Christopher and Philip Larkin, who is the other dominant figure. And I thought 'Well, that gives me a bit more freedom'". The addition of Pheobe Phelps, a completely made-up character, afforded more space for the imagination.

== Structure and themes ==
The book is divided into an introduction ('Preludial'), five parts (the last three called 'antepenultimate, 'penultimate', and 'ultimate'), and two postscripts ('Afterthought' and 'Addendum'). A short story, 'Oktober', is included between parts 2 and 3. Parts 1 and 4 include interludes in which Amis discusses writing.

Death is the main theme of the book. Amis reflects lengthily upon the death of Larkin, Bellow and Hitchens. He also visits the fictional character Phoebe Phelps in her crippled old age, and comments in a postscript on the death of his stepmother, Elizabeth Jane Howard. Amis also laments the approaching end of his writing life. He confesses that at seventy, writing another long fiction seems unlikely, and that he will probably write shorter works until he will eventually "shut up and read".

== Reception ==
Inside Story was for the most part favourably reviewed, although particular aspects of it were regularly critiqued. Several reviewers were baffled by the claim that it was a novel: "Martin Amis’s Inside Story contains so much autofiction, metafiction and just plain nonfiction (there’s an index) that one doesn’t know how to classify the book" Others felt the novel was somewhat recycled, with several ideas and character types appearing in previous novels and essays. As in other Amis novels, critics praised his singular style: "The great lines come flying at you, as always, volleyed out of the cleft of the book and into the magic space beneath your raised eyebrows." Kevin Power wrote that, as in Amis' best novels, Inside Story creates a feeling of intimacy with the reader. Recalling a line from Saul Bellow's Herzog - "Each man has his own batch of poems", Power summarizes the conundrum of the book's genre thus: "What is Inside Story? A novel? A memoir? Perhaps it’s simply an anthology – autumnal, summative – of Martin Amis’s poems".
