= The Second Plane =

Book by Martin Amis

First edition (publ. Jonathan Cape)

The Second Plane (2008) is a collection of twelve pieces of nonfiction and two short stories by the British writer Martin Amis on the subject of the 9/11 attacks, terrorism, Muslim radicalisation and the subsequent global war on terror.

== Essays collected ==
The Second Plane is Amis's seventh collection of nonfiction, drawing upon pieces written for The Guardian, The Observer, The Times, The New Yorker, and The New York Times between 2001-2007 and is by far one of the most controversial and divisive publications of his literary career to date.

== Contents ==
- "The Second Plane," The Guardian, September 18, 2001
- "The Voice of the Lonely Crowd," The Guardian, June, 2002
- "The Wrong War," The Guardian, March, 2003
- "In the Palace of the End" The New Yorker, March, 2004
- "Terror and Boredom: The Dependent Mind," The Observer, September, 2006
- "The Last Days of Muhammad Atta," The New Yorker, April, 2006
- "Iran and the Lord of Time," The New York Times Syndicate, June, 2006
- "What Will Survive of Us," The Times, June, 2006
- "Conspiracy Theories, and Takfir," The Times, September, 2006
- "Bush in Yes Man Land," The Times, October, 2006
- "Demographics," The Times, April, 2007
- "On the Move with Tony Blair," The Guardian, June, 2007
- "An Islamist's Journey," The Times, May, 2007
- "September 11," The Times, September 11, 2007

== Controversy ==
The Second Plane emerged following an accusation of racism levelled at Amis by Marxist theorist Terry Eagleton in 2007, following comments made by Amis in a 2006 interview.
