= Heavy Water and Other Stories =

1998 collection of short stories by Martin Amis

- First edition (UK)
- Author: Martin Amis
- Language: English
- Publisher: Jonathan Cape (UK); Harmony (US)
- Publication date: 1998 (UK), 1999 (US)
- Publication place: United Kingdom
- Media type: Print, Audio & eBook
- Pages: 240
- ISBN: 0-224-05126-1

Heavy Water and Other Stories is a collection of nine short stories by Martin Amis. It was first published in 1998 by Jonathan Cape.

== Two Stories ==
The collection includes "Denton's Death" and "Let Me Count the Times," which comprised Amis's Two Stories, published in 1994.

== Stories ==
- "Career Move" (first published in The New Yorker in 1992) in which the literary world is inverted; screenplay writers such as Alistair struggle to have their work published in small magazines, whilst poets such as Luke are courted by Hollywood publishing conglomerates and fly first-class around the world.
- "Denton's Death" (Encounter, 1976) in which the protagonist sits alone in his squalid room and ponders his forthcoming assassination at the hands of three hired killers using a 'machine'.
- "State of England" (The New Yorker, 1986) set at a fee-paying school, the narrator using a mobile phone to communicate with his estranged wife and reflecting on his up and down career as a bouncer.
- "Let me Count the Times" (Granta, 1981) in which a man has an obsessive and increasingly intense affair with himself and his imagination which gradually takes over from his relationship with his wife.
- "The Coincidence of the Arts" (1997) in which an English Baronet becomes entangled with an American chess hustler and aspiring novelist and has an unexpected affair with a silent Afro-Caribbean woman.
- "Heavy Water" (New Statesman, 1978) in which a working-class woman takes her mentally handicapped son on a Mediterranean cruise.
- "The Janitor on Mars" (The New Yorker, 1998) in which a robot makes contact from Mars and reveals the shocking truth of mankind's place in the Universe.
- "Straight Fiction" (Esquire, 1995) in which everyone is gay, apart from the beleaguered though increasingly vocal 'straight' community.
- "What Happened to me on Holiday" (The New Yorker, 1997) in which death rears its head in the life of a young boy.

== Audio ==
A recording of "What Happened to Me on Holiday"—read by Martin Amis—is included in the 1998 audio collection The New Yorker Out Loud.

== Reception ==
The book was widely praised upon publication.

- In The New York Times Book Review, critic A.O. Scott wrote that "the publication of Heavy Water, a gathering of nine stories, most of them published in this decade, nearly half in The New Yorker, provides a good opportunity to state plainly what has been apparent for some time: Martin Amis is the best American writer England has ever produced." Scott praised Amis's "reckless bravado and his terrifying cleverness, both of which are abundantly evident." Commenting on the strict premises (swapped literary reputations, reversed norms), he wrote, "Some of the most interesting stories seem to have been written on a dare, or as entries in a contest to see who could get the best results from the worst ideas."
- In the London Times, Russell Celyn Jones found the stories demonstrating Amis's "maturation," and called the book "highly inventive, inimitably stylish and funny, exhibiting a wider voice range than in anything he has done so far."
- In The Times Literary Supplement, Tom Shone wrote, "As this collection demonstrates, Amis's own sentences could not be more different: whipping through the gearbox with seamless ease. Amis has famously said that his ambition is to write the sort of sentences that no other guy could write. The same thing applies to his work as applies to that of every other guy; when he is writing well, his sentences appear to have written themselves."
- In the Evening Standard, Rachel Cusk found, "As Amis's commitment to his writing has deepened, so its critical treatment has grown more facetious. As he has become more meticulous, so his critics have grown lazier."
- Michael Dirda, in The Washington Post, called the stories, "Funny, sexy, disturbing, tantalizing, sharply satirical, even wistful."
