= The Information (novel) =

1995 novel by Martin Amis

- First UK edition cover
- Author: Martin Amis
- Language: English
- Publisher: Flamingo (UK); Harmony Books (US)
- Publication date: 1995
- Publication place: England
- Media type: Print (hardback & paperback)
- Pages: 494
- ISBN: 0-00-225356-9

The Information is a 1995 novel by British writer Martin Amis. The plot involves two forty-year-old novelists, Richard Tull (unsuccessful) and Gwyn Barry (very successful). Amis has asserted that both characters are based (if they can be regarded as based on anybody) on himself. It is, says Amis, a book about "literary enmity".

== Synopsis ==
Richard Tull and Gwyn Barry have been friends since they were college roommates. Richard is a writer whose first novel, Aforethought, was published, but 'nobody understood it, or even finished it.' Three years later, his second novel, Dreams Don't Mean Anything, was published in Britain but not America. His third, fourth and all subsequent novels were not published. His career flags and he finds himself becoming depressed, writing book reviews, articles for a small literary magazine and sub-editing for a vanity press. To his chagrin, Gwyn Barry—whose literary skills Tull holds in low esteem—has written a successful second novel, entitled Amelior (about a rural utopia) and is in the running to win a lucrative and respected literary prize. Barry enjoys a rarefied life, with his agent striking lucrative deals for Amelior Regained while Tull toils away with his unsuccessful pursuits.

Tull, increasingly envious, begins to manufacture ways of bringing Barry down. These begin relatively innocently as attempts to cause Barry inconvenience. Later, however, things become much more serious as Tull makes contact with violent men he later finds he cannot control.

== Themes ==
In a later interview, Amis elaborated on the subject of midlife crisis, describing it as "an hysterical overreaction to the certain knowledge that you're going to die."

Throughout the narrative, Amis digresses into depicting different vistas of interstellar space. Looking on the vast range of the universe and its lifelessness serves the theme of mortality. In addition, the book deals with ideas of success, failure, and envy.

== Reception ==
The New York Times said, "Amis is quite dazzling here [...] drags a bit around the middle, but you're never out of reach of a sparkly phrase, stiletto metaphor or drop-dead insight into the human condition." A further review from the same paper said "Amis has [an] idiosyncratic vision and his ability to articulate that vision in wonderfully edgy, street-smart prose [...] an uncompromising and highly ambitious novel that should also be a big popular hit." The Independent gave a less favourable review saying, "The Information has been seen as the conclusion of a London trilogy that opened with Money and London Fields - but that argument doesn't stand up. They're all the same book, a template worked over three times, retyped rather than rewritten [...] The Information reads like 500 pages of smart, highly finished extracts. It doesn't add up. It's a Herbie Hide of a novel, a pumped cruiserweight, flashy, fast, brave and hopelessly overmatched."

== Circumstances surrounding publication ==
Amis came under attack for two reasons around the time The Information was published. Firstly, he had dropped his agent, Pat Kavanagh, wife of Julian Barnes, and had signed up with Andrew Wylie, perceived to be a more aggressive agent. Amis and Barnes had been friends but this caused a rift that was played out in public. Secondly, he received an almost unheard of advance for a literary novel (approximately £500,000 according to most sources) which caused what was described as resentment and envy amongst his peers.
