= Pat Kavanagh (agent) =

British literary agent (1940–2008)

- Kavanagh in 1972
- Born: 31 January 1940; Durban, South Africa
- Died: 20 October 2008 (aged 68); London, England
- Resting place: Highgate Cemetery
- Education: University of Cape Town
- Occupation: Literary agent
- Spouse: Julian Barnes (m. 1979)

Patricia Olive Kavanagh (31 January 1940 – 20 October 2008) was a British literary agent.

== Life and work ==
Kavanagh was born in 1940 in Durban, South Africa, where her father was a journalist before and after his service as a fighter pilot in the SAAF during the Second World War. Her mother, Olive (née Le Roux), was a pioneering public health inspector. Her half-sister, Julie Kavanagh, is a ballet critic. Her half-brother, Michael O'Brien, is a geologist living in Vancouver, British Columbia, Canada.

She attended the University of Cape Town, but pursued an interest in acting. She had an uncredited, non-speaking role in Dylan Thomas's Under Milk Wood after coming to Britain in 1964. She did not get paid for the part, but, as she later recalled, she did "get to snog Richard Burton". It marked the end of her acting career. While working for J. Walter Thompson as a copywriter, she answered an advertisement for a position as a literary agent. She was hired by "A. D. Peters, a legendary agent who showed her the ropes", taught her how to negotiate and gave her responsibility for selling serialization and newspaper rights for the agency's early group of clients, including Arthur Koestler, S. J. Perelman, Rebecca West and Tom Wolfe.

Kavanagh was married to, and was the literary agent of, the writer Julian Barnes. They lived in North London. In the 1980s, Kavanagh left Barnes for a relationship with author Jeanette Winterson, but later returned to the marriage. Winterson is said to have used the relationship as the basis of her 1987 novel The Passion.

Kavanagh became the agent in 1985 of Martin Amis, who left her after 23 years to "throw in his lot" with American agent Andrew Wylie, as part of an effort to get a large advance for his own novel The Information. In 2001, her employer, now known as Peters, Fraser & Dunlop, was purchased by CSS Stellar, a company specializing in sports marketing. Kavanagh was one of several former employees who left the company in September 2007 to form United Agents. Her clients left to join her at the new firm.

She died of a brain tumour on 20 October 2008 in London, aged 68, and was buried on the east side of Highgate Cemetery.

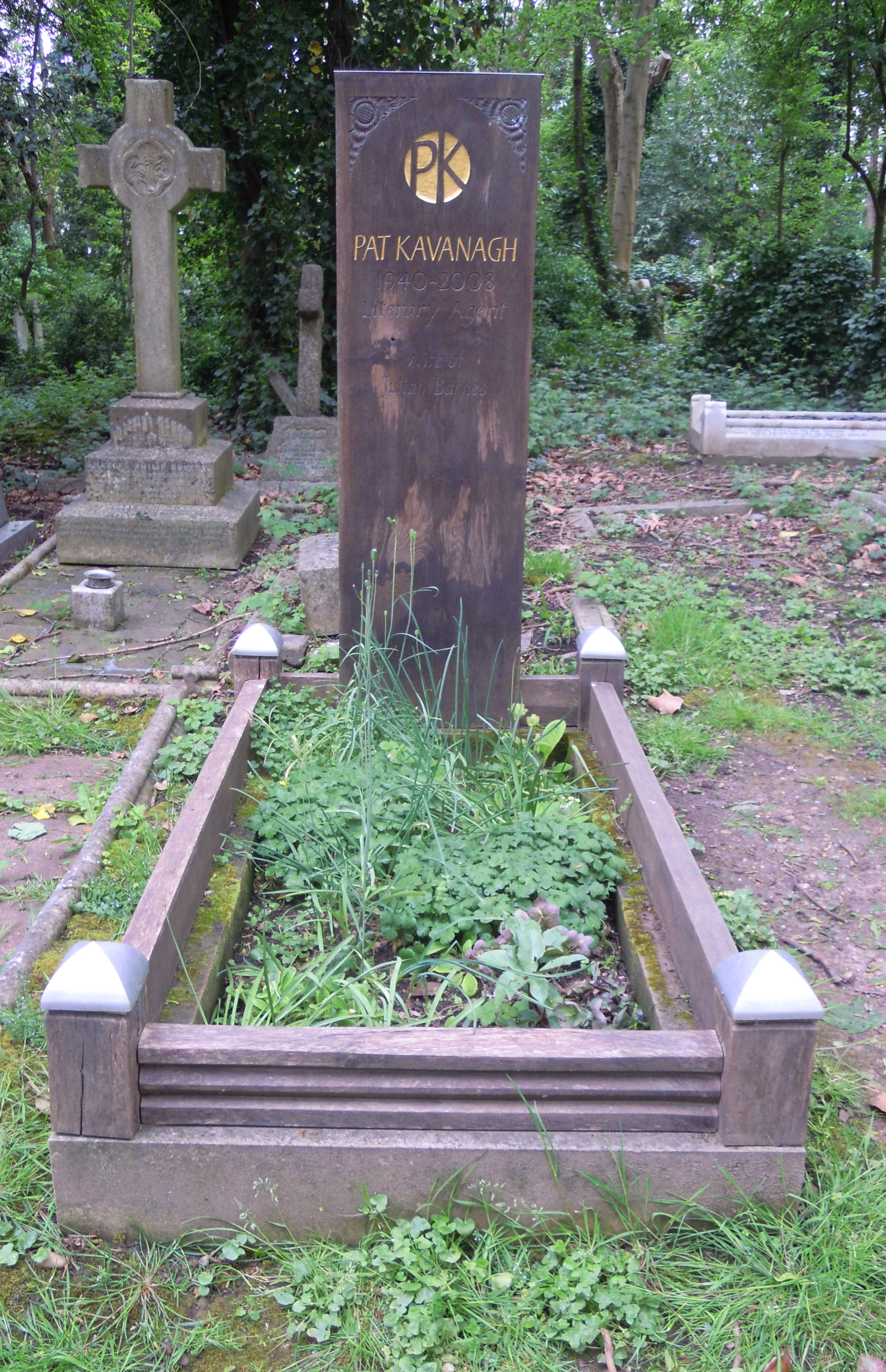
Kavanagh's grave in Highgate Cemetery

== Clients ==
Her clients included:

- Sally Beauman
- Dirk Bogarde (estate)
- Duncan Campbell
- Lindsay Clarke
- Wendy Cope
- Russell Davies
- Michael Dibdin
- Douglas Dunn
- James Fenton
- Sir Christopher Frayling
- Nicci and Sean French
- Simon Garfield
- Andrew Graham-Dixon
- Robert Harris
- John Irving
- Clive James
- Jackie Kay
- Leslie Kenton
- Arthur Koestler (estate)
- Dame Hermione Lee
- Laurie Lee (estate)
- Prue Leith
- Adam Mars-Jones
- Brian Moore (estate)
- Blake Morrison
- Sir Andrew Motion
- Chris Mullin
- John Preston
- Ruth Rendell
- Helen Simpson
- Sandi Toksvig
- William Trevor, KBE
- Joanna Trollope (aka Caroline Harvey)
- Auberon Waugh (estate)
- Francis Wheen
- Bee Wilson
- Jeanette Winterson
