= The Pregnant Widow =

2010 novel by Martin Amis

- First edition
- Author: Martin Amis
- Language: English
- Genre: Novel
- Publisher: Jonathan Cape
- Publication date: February 2010
- Pages: 370 pp (hardback first edition)
- ISBN: 0-224-07612-4

The Pregnant Widow is a novel by the English writer Martin Amis, published by Jonathan Cape on 4 February 2010. Its theme is the feminist revolution, which Amis sees as incomplete and bewildering for women, echoing the view of the 19th-century Russian writer, Alexander Herzen, that revolution is "a long night of chaos and desolation". The "pregnant widow", a phrase taken from Herzen's From the other shore (1848–1850), is the point at which the old order has given way, the new one not yet born. Amis said in 2007 that "consciousness is not revolutionised by the snap of a finger. And feminism, I reckon, is about halfway through its second trimester."

The story is set in a castle owned by a cheese tycoon in Campania, Italy, where Keith Nearing, a 20-year-old English literature student; his girlfriend, Lily; and her friend, Scheherazade, are on holiday during the hot summer of 1970, the year that Amis says "something was changing in the world of men and women". The narrator is Keith's superego, or conscience, in 2009.

The novel was a work-in-progress for the best part of seven years, his first since House of Meetings (2006). Originally set for release in late 2007, its publication was delayed to 2008, when he made what he describes as a "terrible decision" to abandon what he had written to that point, and begin again, building the story up from one section he retained, the part about Italy. The long gestation period resulted in its expansion to some 370 pages, making it his longest novel since The Information in 1995.

== Background ==
Amis started writing the novel after the publication in 2003 of Yellow Dog to a hostile critical reception and muted commercial success. In a 2006 interview with The Independent, he revealed that he had abandoned a novella, The Unknown Known, and instead continued to work on a follow-up full novel that he had started in 2003. He said the new novel was "blindingly autobiographical, but with an Islamic theme". In an interview with Mark Lawson in 2006, Amis said there was some distance from the fictionalised versions of himself, his father, Kingsley Amis and his novelist mentor, Saul Bellow, in The Pregnant Widow, at this point untitled. He said he was "trying to keep up a little bit of indirection" with the autobiographical aspects, saying that his character in the novel was named "Louis" (Amis's middle name), that Kingsley Amis was "The King" and that Saul Bellow was "Chick" (which itself was a reference to the Saul Bellow proxy character in Bellow's final novel Ravelstein).

Further details concerning the struggle to get the novel written emerged on 1 August 2009 during an interview Amis gave the National Post: "I started a novel [but] then I’m going to write a novella before I get on to it. But I was in big trouble a few years ago, with a huge, dead novel. And it took me a long time, and a lot of grief, to realize—I thought I was clutching at straws—it turned out it was actually two novels, and they couldn't go together. So I wrote The Pregnant Widow, [that’s] one half of it, and the other half I started, and it will be very autobiographical, the next one."

=== Sally Amis ===
The character of Violet Nearing, the protagonist's younger sister, is based on Sally Myfanwy Amis (19 January 1954 – 8 November 2000), Martin's younger sister. She had problems all her life with alcoholism and was described by Amis as one of the sexual revolution's most spectacular victims. At age 24 she gave birth to a daughter, Catherine, who was placed for adoption at three months. Sally suffered a stroke at 40 and died of an infection at age 46.

== Reception ==
The novel was published to mixed reviews, Eileen Battersby in The Irish Times calling it a "thumping disappointment", while Richard Bradford in The Spectator described it as a "unique, sometimes exquisite experience".

After a considerable amount of speculation and high expectation, the novel was not included on the longlist for the 2010 Man Booker Prize.
