= Andrew Wylie (literary agent) =

American literary agent (born 1947)

- Born: 1947 (age 78–79)
- Other name: The Jackal
- Education: Harvard University
- Occupation: Literary agent
- Known for: Founder of The Wylie Agency
- Website: www.wylieagency.com

Andrew Wylie (born 1947) is an American literary agent.

== Early life ==
Wylie is the son of Craig Wylie (1908–1976), one-time editor-in-chief at Houghton Mifflin, and Angela Fowler (1915–1989), daughter of the landscape architect and artist Robert Ludlow Fowler, Jr, of Oatlands, New York (son of judge Robert Ludlow Fowler, author of many legal texts).

Wylie grew up in Sudbury, Massachusetts, and attended St. Paul's School in Concord, New Hampshire, from which he was dismissed in 1965; an interview with his university alumni magazine stated that this was for arranging illicit excursions to Boston for fellow students and supplying them, illegally, with alcohol. When he was a teenager, he spent nine months in Manhattan's Payne Whitney clinic, a psychiatric hospital, for punching a police officer.

He graduated from Harvard University.

== Career ==
=== Poet ===
In 1972, Wylie published a short collection of poetry, Yellow Flowers. Many of the verses cited in public sources are sexually explicit in nature. In a 2007 interview, fellow agent Ira Silverberg suggested that Wylie has since attempted to acquire the remaining copies of the collection. Wylie himself denied this allegation, describing Yellow Flowers as a "youthful indiscretion".

=== Literary agent ===
Wylie founded the literary agency named after himself in New York in 1980 with a $10,000 loan from his mother. He opened a second office in London in 1996. It now represents more than 1,300 clients, approximately 10% of these being literary estates.

Throughout his career as a literary agent, Wylie has attracted attention for poaching clients from other agents, and has been nicknamed "The Jackal" for his business tactics. He has been criticized by other agents and publishers for harming the culture of the book industry. In 1995, Martin Amis left his agent of 22 years, Pat Kavanagh, for Wylie, who was reported to have secured an advance of £500,000 for Amis's novel The Information.

In July 2010, Wylie launched a new business, Odyssey Editions, to publish e-books. The first twenty titles were launched on 21 July, available exclusively from Amazon.com. Wylie's friendly attitude towards Amazon was short-lived, however; in 2014 he advised: "If you have a choice between the plague and Amazon, pick the plague." He later went on to liken Amazon's tactics to those of the Islamic State.

== Personal life ==
In 1969, Wylie married his first wife, Christina, whom he had met in college. They had a son together, Nikolas. They divorced c.1974. In 1980, Wylie remarried. Larry Clark was his best man. He has two additional children.
