= The War Against Cliché =

2001 book by Martin Amis

First edition

The War Against Cliché (2001) is an anthology of essays, book reviews and literary criticism from the British author Martin Amis. The collection received the National Book Critics Circle award in 2001.

== Title ==
The book takes its title from one of Amis' essays, an encomium to James Joyce's novel Ulysses. Amis characterizes that novel as Joyce's "campaign against cliché". Amis writes,

To idealise: all writing is a campaign against cliche. Not just cliches of the pen but cliches of the mind and cliches of the heart. When I dispraise, I am usually quoting cliches. When I praise, I am usually quoting the opposed qualities of freshness, energy and reverberation of voice.

== Contents ==
Like Amis's previous collection Visiting Mrs Nabokov, the book is composed of many pieces written over the course of the author's career, beginning in the mid-1970s as a journalist and following up to his period of recognition as one of Great Britain's most acclaimed novelists. Among the many authors considered are John Updike, Anthony Burgess, Saul Bellow, Iris Murdoch, Elmore Leonard and Philip Roth.

Many of the essays also touch on pet topics of Amis's, such as chess, poker, football, cue sports, masculinity, and nuclear weapons.

== Awards ==
The collection received the National Book Critics Circle Award for criticism in 2001.
