= Koba the Dread =

2002 non-fiction book by British writer Martin Amis

Koba the Dread: Laughter and the Twenty Million
- Author: Martin Amis
- Publication date: 2002
- ISBN: 9780676975178

Koba the Dread: Laughter and the Twenty Million is a 2002 non-fiction book by British writer Martin Amis.

== Summary ==
The book is a study of the depredations of the regime of Joseph Stalin in the Soviet Union from the 1920s to the 1950s. The title alludes to Stalin's nickname "Koba", and the estimated 20 million deaths in the Soviet Union during Stalin's rule owing to starvation, torture, gulags, and the purges and confessions of Stalin's Great Terror. The estimate of deaths under Stalin comes from Robert Conquest's work, a key source and personal friend of Amis.

== Reception ==
In The New York Times, critic Michiko Kakutani described the book as "the narcissistic musings of a spoiled, upper-middle class litterateur who has never known the kind of real suffering Stalin's victims did". Publishers Weekly found that Amis "relates passionately a story that needs to be told, the history of a regime that murdered its own people in order to build a better future for them." Author Anne Applebaum, writing in Slate, argued that "Koba the Dread is not, in fact, a competent account of Stalin's reign but rather a muddled misrendering of both Soviet and Western intellectual history."

The Leningrad-born American writer Gary Shteyngart called Koba "harrowing and strangely funny" in The Washington Post, explaining: "'Koba the Dread' is not easy to forget. Along with the laughter it offers the reader unfamiliar with Stalin's legacy a number that is the first step in understanding Russia's modern tragedy. That number, once again, is twenty million." In The New York Times Book Review, writer and critic Paul Berman called the work "one of the oddest books about Stalin ever written, indignant, angry, personal and strangely touching ... [Amis's] book carries a punch, artfully delivered—a punch that comes from looking at death and finding in it nothing but pain, cruelty, sadness, pointlessness and loss, a punch that comes from gazing at the indescribably horrific prison camps of the Soviet Union, or that comes from watching one's father and sister die." The book received scathing reviews in the United Kingdom. Writing in The Guardian, Seumas Milne says that the book is "the latest contribution to the rewriting of history that began in the dying days of the Soviet Union and has intensified since its collapse." Historian Orlando Figes criticised Amis for, amongst other things, comparing the crying of his six-month daughter with the cries from Butyrka prison in Moscow during the Great Terror.

== Controversy ==
The book occasioned a public schism between Amis and fellow writer and close friend Christopher Hitchens, especially in the pages of The Atlantic, where Hitchens described Koba the Dread as "Stalinism without irony". The break was later mended.

== See also ==
- The Great Terror
- The Gulag Archipelago
