= Money (British TV series) =

British television series

Money is a British television series based on the 1984 novel of the same name by British author Martin Amis. First aired in May 2010, the two-part series was produced for the BBC, starring Nick Frost in the lead role as John Self, with Tim Pigott-Smith, Hattie Morahan, Adrian Lukis, and Emma Pierson also featuring in the series.
