= Martin Amis =

English novelist (1949–2023)

Sir Martin Amis FRSL
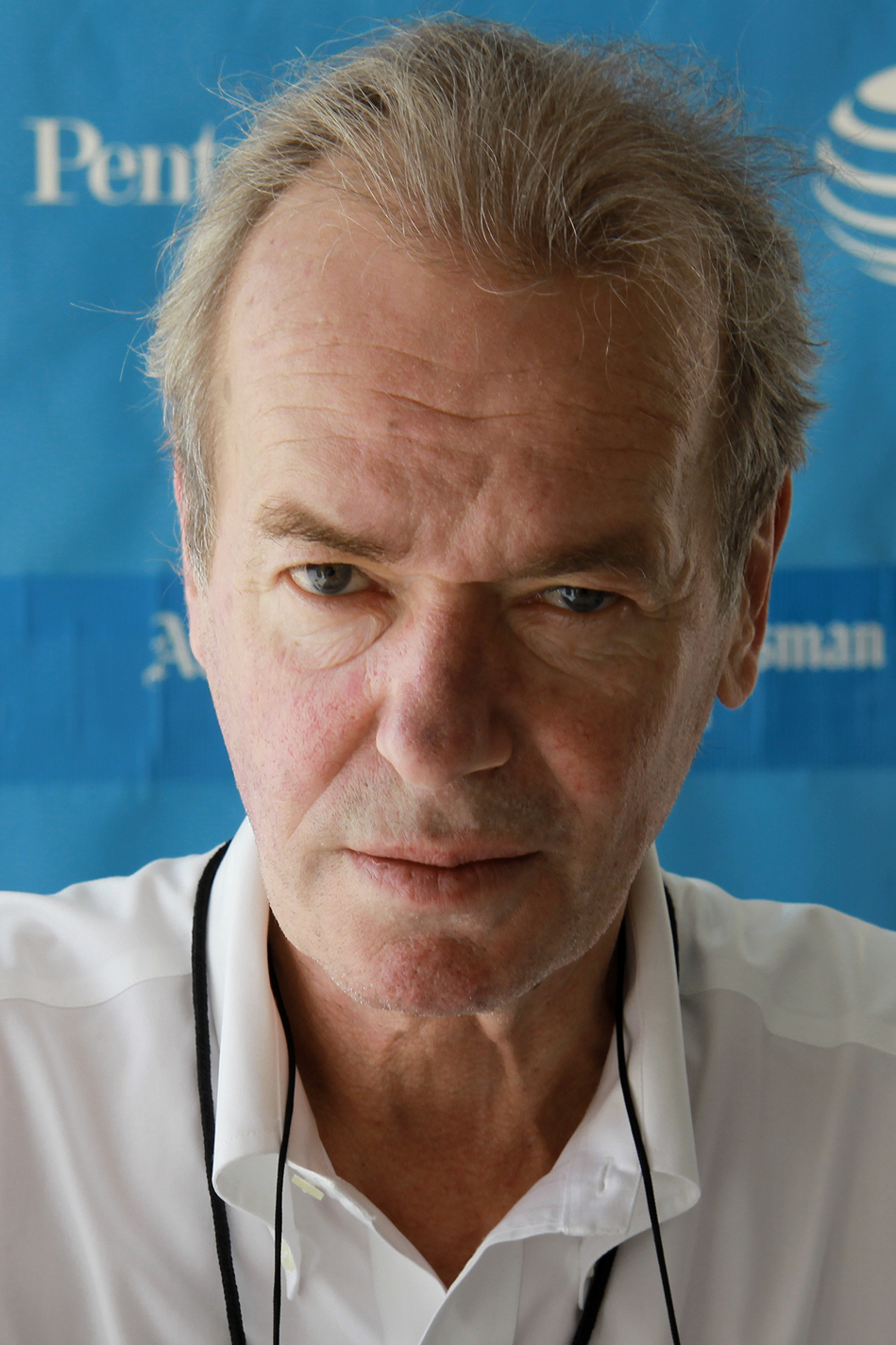
- Amis in 2014
- Born: Martin Louis Amis; 25 August 1949; Oxford, England
- Died: 19 May 2023 (aged 73); Lake Worth Beach, Florida, U.S.
- Education: University of Oxford
- Spouses: Antonia Phillips (m. 1984; div. 1993); Isabel Fonseca (m. 1996)
- Children: 5
- Parents: Kingsley Amis; Hilary Kilmarnock
- Relatives: Philip Amis (brother); Sally Amis (sister); Lucy Partington (cousin)
- Writing career
- Pen name: Henry Tilney
- Notable works: The Rachel Papers (1973); Money (1984); London Fields (1989)
- Notable awards: Knight Bachelor; 2023
- Martin Amis's voice Recorded April 2010 from the BBC Radio 3 programme Night Waves

Sir Martin Louis Amis (25 August 1949 – 19 May 2023) was an English novelist, essayist, memoirist, screenwriter and critic. He is best known for his novels Money (1984) and London Fields (1989). He received the James Tait Black Memorial Prize for his memoir Experience and was twice listed for the Booker Prize (shortlisted in 1991 for Time's Arrow and longlisted in 2003 for Yellow Dog). Amis was a professor of creative writing at the University of Manchester's Centre for New Writing from 2007 until 2011. In 2008, The Times named him one of the 50 greatest British writers since 1945.

Amis's work centres on the excesses of late capitalist Western society, whose perceived absurdity he often satirised through grotesque caricature. He was portrayed by some literary critics as a master of what The New York Times called "the new unpleasantness.” He was inspired by Saul Bellow and Vladimir Nabokov, as well as by his father Kingsley Amis. Amis influenced many British novelists of the late 20th and early 21st centuries, including Will Self and Zadie Smith.

His stylistic innovations – marked by ironic detachment, baroque sentence structures, and postmodern narrative experimentation – shaped a generation of British writers. His novels are often credited with revitalizing the comic novel in late 20th-century Britain.

Amis died from oesophageal cancer at his house in Florida in 2023. A. O. Scott wrote in The New York Times after his death: "To come of reading age in the last three decades of the 20th century – from the oil embargo through the fall of the Berlin Wall, all the way to 9/11 – was to live, it now seems clear, in the Amis Era."

== Early life and education ==
Martin Louis Amis was born on 25 August 1949 at Radcliffe Maternity Hospital in Oxford, England. His father, novelist Kingsley Amis, was the son of a mustard manufacturer's clerk from Clapham, London; his mother, Kingston upon Thames-born Hilary ("Hilly") Ann Bardwell, was the daughter of a Ministry of Agriculture civil servant. (Note: Hilly Bardwell (21 July 1928 – 24 June 2010) was married three times, first to Kingsley Amis from 1948 to 1965, with whom she had three children, Philip, Martin, and Sally. Her second husband was D. R. Shackleton Bailey from 1967 to 1975, and finally, she married Alastair Boyd, 7th Baron Kilmarnock, in 1977; they had one son, James, born in 1972.) He had an elder brother, Philip; his younger sister, Sally – for whose birth Philip Larkin composed "Born Yesterday" – died in 2000 at the age of 46. His parents married in 1948 in Oxford. The following year the family moved to Swansea where he would spend his childhood years, his father having taken up a lectureship at Swansea University. The acclaim that followed his father's first novel Lucky Jim (1954) sent the family to Princeton, New Jersey, in the United States, where his father lectured for a year.

Amis attended a number of schools in the 1950s and 1960s, including an international school in Mallorca, Bishop Gore School in Swansea, and Cambridgeshire High School for Boys, where he was described by one headmaster as "unusually unpromising" and in London at the Sir Walter St John's Grammar School for Boys from which he was expelled for truancy.

His parents' marriage ended in divorce in 1965, precipitated by his father’s well-established relationship with the novelist Elizabeth Jane Howard, whom he married later the same year. They had set up house in the Maida Vale area of London and were part of a “literary bohemia” which formed the backdrop to Amis’s largely unsupervised and dissolute adolescence. In 1968 the household relocated to the Lemmons, a Georgian villa in Barnet on the outskirts of London. His father said Amis was not a bookish child and "read nothing but science fiction till he was fifteen or sixteen".

He did, however, form a positive relationship with his step-mother having become, at her behest, part of the household, moving away from the chaotic living arrangements in his mother’s house. Her friendship with the film director Alexander Mackendrick led to the young Amis being chosen in 1965 to play the part of John Thornton in the film version of Richard Hughes's A High Wind in Jamaica And in order to enhance his prospects of a university education, she provided him with reading recommendations (she introduced him to Jane Austen, whom he often named as his earliest influence) and arranged a place for him at Sussex Tutors, a crammer boarding school in Brighton where he gained the required O- and A-level qualifications for sitting the University of Oxford entrance examination.

He graduated from Exeter College, Oxford, with a congratulatory first in English, "the sort where you are called in for a viva and the examiners tell you how much they enjoyed reading your papers".

After graduating from Oxford in 1971, Amis wrote reviews of science-fiction novels under the nom de plume "Henry Tilney" (a nod to Austen) in a column for The Observer. (Note: His reviews included works by Asimov, Blish, Brunner, Clarke, Silverberg, Simak, Van Vogt, Zelazny and other leading writers in the field. Terence Kilmartin, The Observer's literary editor, said that the tryout review he asked Amis to produce was thought by his colleagues to be the "work of someone who'd been reviewing for twenty years".) He found an entry-level job at The Times Literary Supplement by the summer of 1972. At the age of 27, he became literary editor of the New Statesman, where he cited writer and editor John Gross as his role model, and met Christopher Hitchens, then a feature writer for The Observer, who remained Amis's closest friend until his death in 2011.

== Early writing ==
According to Amis, his father was deeply critical of certain aspects of his work. "I can point out the exact place where he stopped [reading Amis's novel Money] and sent it twirling through the air; that's where the character named Martin Amis comes in." Kingsley complained: "Breaking the rules, buggering about with the reader, drawing attention to himself."

His first novel The Rachel Papers (1973) – written at Lemmons, the family home in north London – won the Somerset Maugham Award. It tells the story of a bright, egotistical teenager and his relationship with the eponymous girlfriend in the year before going to university; It has been described as "autobiographical" and was made into an unsuccessful 1989 film.

Dead Babies (1975), more flippant in tone, chronicles a few days in the lives of some friends who convene in a country house to take drugs. A number of Amis's writerly characteristics show up here for the first time: mordant black humour, obsession with the zeitgeist, authorial intervention, a character subjected to sadistically humorous misfortunes and humiliations, and a defiant casualness ("my attitude has been, I don't know much about science, but I know what I like"). A film adaptation was made in 2000, which Guardian film critic Peter Bradshaw described as "boring, embarrassing, nasty and stupid – and not in a good way".

Success (1977) told the story of two foster-brothers, Gregory Riding and Terry Service, and their rising and falling fortunes. This was the first example of Amis's fondness for symbolically "pairing" characters in his novels, which has been a recurrent feature in his fiction since (Martin Amis and Martina Twain in Money, Richard Tull and Gwyn Barry in The Information, and Jennifer Rockwell and Mike Hoolihan in Night Train). During this period, because producer Stanley Donen detected an affinity between his story and the "debauched and nihilistic nature" of Dead Babies, Amis was invited to work on the screenplay for the science-fiction film Saturn 3 (1980). The film was far from a critical success, but Amis was able to draw on the experience for his fifth novel, Money, published in 1984.

Other People: A Mystery Story (1981) – the title is a reference to Sartre's Huis Clos – is about a young woman coming out of a coma. It was a transitional novel in that it was the first of Amis's to show authorial intervention in the narrative voice, and highly artificed language in the heroine's descriptions of everyday objects, which was said to be influenced by his contemporary Craig Raine's "Martian" school of poetry. It was also the first novel Amis published after committing to being a full-time writer in 1980.

== Main career ==
=== 1980s and 1990s ===
Amis's best-known novels are Money, London Fields and The Information, commonly referred to as his "London Trilogy". Although the books share little in terms of plot and narrative, they all examine the lives of middle-aged men, exploring the sordid, debauched, and post-apocalyptic undercurrents of life in late 20th-century Britain. Amis's London protagonists are anti-heroes: they engage in questionable behaviour, are passionate iconoclasts, and strive to escape the apparent banality and futility of their lives. Amis wrote, "The world is like a human being. And there's a scientific name for it, which is entropy – everything tends towards disorder. From an ordered state to a disordered state."

Money (1984, subtitled A Suicide Note) is a first-person narrative by John Self, advertising man and would-be film director, who is "addicted to the twentieth century". "[A] satire of Thatcherite amorality and greed", the novel relates a series of black comedic episodes as Self flies back and forth across the Atlantic, in crass and seemingly chaotic pursuit of personal and professional success. Time included the novel in its list of the 100 best English-language novels of 1923 to 2005. On 11 November 2009, The Guardian reported that the BBC had adapted Money for television as part of its early 2010 schedule for BBC 2. Nick Frost played John Self, and the adaptation also featured Vincent Kartheiser, Emma Pierson and Jerry Hall. The adaptation was written by Tom Butterworth and Chris Hurford. After the transmission of the first of the two parts, Amis was quick to praise the adaptation, stating: "All the performances [were] without weak spots. I thought Nick Frost was absolutely extraordinary as John Self. He fills the character. It's a very unusual performance in that he's very funny, he's physically comic, but he's also strangely graceful, a pleasure to watch ... It looked very expensive even though it wasn't and that's a feat ... The earlier script I saw was disappointing [but] they took it back and worked on it and it's hugely improved. My advice was to use more of the language of the novel, the dialogue, rather than making it up."

Martin Amis talks about creative writing, his father and PR for books. (Interview 1990)

London Fields (1989), Amis's longest and "most London" novel, describes the encounters between three main characters in London in 1999, as a climate disaster approaches. The characters have typically Amisian names and broad caricatured qualities: Keith Talent, the lower-class crook with a passion for darts; Nicola Six, a femme fatale who is determined to be murdered; and upper-class Guy Clinch, "the fool, the foil, the poor foal" who is destined to come between the other two.

The book was controversially omitted from the Booker Prize shortlist in 1989, because two panel members, Maggie Gee and Helen McNeil, disliked Amis's treatment of his female characters. "It was an incredible row," Martyn Goff, the Booker's director, told The Independent. "Maggie and Helen felt that Amis treated women appallingly in the book. That is not to say they thought books which treated women badly couldn't be good, they simply felt that the author should make it clear he didn't favour or bless that sort of treatment. Really, there were only two of them and they should have been outnumbered as the other three were in agreement, but such was the sheer force of their argument and passion that they won. David [Lodge] has told me he regrets it to this day, he feels he failed somehow by not saying, 'It's two against three, Martin's on the list'." A 2018 film of London Fields, on which Amis worked as a scriptwriter, suffered from a problematic production process and was critically and commercially unsuccessful.

Amis's 1991 novel, the short Time's Arrow, was shortlisted for the Booker Prize. Notable for its backwards narrative, including dialogue in reverse, the novel is the autobiography of a Nazi concentration camp doctor. The reversal of the arrow of time in the novel, a technique borrowed from Kurt Vonnegut's Slaughterhouse 5 (1969) and Philip K. Dick's Counter-Clock World (1967), is a narrative style that itself functions in Amis's hands as commentary on the Nazis' rationalisation of death and destruction as forces of creation with the resurrection of Nordic mythology in the service of German nation-building.

The Information (1995) was notable not so much for its critical success, but for the scandals surrounding its publication. The enormous advance of £500,000 (almost US$800,000) demanded and subsequently obtained by Amis for the novel attracted what the author described as "an Eisteddfod of hostility" from writers and critics after he abandoned his long-serving agent, Pat Kavanagh, to be represented by the Harvard-educated Andrew Wylie. The split was by no means amicable; it created a rift between Amis and his long-time friend, Julian Barnes, who was married to Kavanagh. According to Amis's autobiographical collection Experience (2000), he and Barnes had not resolved their differences. The Information itself deals with the relationship between a pair of British writers of fiction: one, a spectacularly successful purveyor of "airport novels", is envied by his friend, an equally unsuccessful writer of philosophical and generally abstruse prose.

Amis's 1997 short novel Night Train is narrated by Mike Hoolihan, a tough woman detective with a man's name. The story revolves around the suicide of her boss's young, beautiful, and seemingly happy daughter. Night Train is written in the language of American 'noir' crime fiction, but subverts expectations of an exciting investigation and neat, satisfying ending. Many reviewers were harsh in their criticism; for example, John Updike "hated" it, but others such as Jason Crowley writing in Prospect applauded his attempt to write in an American idiom and Beata Piątek wanted "to discuss Night Train as more than a clumsy spoof detective story and argue that it is an intellectual and intertextual joke that Amis plays on the critics who compare him with the American writers and criticise him for his sexist portrayal of women." The novel found other defenders too, notably in Janis Bellow, wife of Amis's mentor and friend Saul Bellow. It was adapted for the cinema in 2018 as Out of Blue.

=== 2000s ===
The 2000s were Amis's least productive decade in terms of full-length fiction since starting in the 1970s (two novels in ten years), while his non-fiction work saw a dramatic increase in volume (three published works including a memoir, a hybrid of semi-memoir and amateur political history, and another journalism collection). In 2000, Amis published the memoir Experience, largely concerned with the relationship between the author and his father, the novelist Kingsley Amis. Amis describes his reunion with his daughter, Delilah Seale, resulting from an affair in the 1970s, whom he did not see until she was 19. Amis also discusses, at length, the murder of his cousin Lucy Partington by Fred West when she was 21. The book was awarded the James Tait Black Memorial Prize for biography.

In 2002, Amis published Koba the Dread, a devastating history of the crimes of Stalin and the denial that they received from many writers and academics in the West. The book precipitated a literary controversy for its approach to the material and for its attack on Amis's long-time friend Christopher Hitchens. Amis accused Hitchens – who was once a committed leftist – of sympathy for Stalin and communism. Although Hitchens wrote a vituperative response to the book in The Atlantic, his friendship with Amis emerged unchanged: in response to a reporter's question, Amis responded, "We never needed to make up. We had an adult exchange of views, mostly in print, and that was that (or, more exactly, that goes on being that). My friendship with the Hitch has always been perfectly cloudless. It is a love whose month is ever May."

In 2003, Amis published Yellow Dog, his first novel in six years. The book received mixed reviews, with some critics proclaiming the novel a return to form, but its reception was mostly negative. The novelist Tibor Fischer denounced it: "Yellow Dog isn't bad as in not very good or slightly disappointing. It's not-knowing-where-to-look bad. I was reading my copy on the Tube and I was terrified someone would look over my shoulder ... It's like your favourite uncle being caught in a school playground, masturbating." Amis was unrepentant about the novel and its reaction, calling Yellow Dog "among my best three". He gave his own explanation for the novel's critical failure: "No one wants to read a difficult literary novel or deal with a prose style which reminds them how thick they are. There's a push towards egalitarianism, making writing more chummy and interactive, instead of a higher voice, and that's what I go to literature for." Yellow Dog "controversially made the 13-book longlist for the 2003 Booker Prize, despite some scathing reviews", but failed to win the award. Following the harsh reviews afforded to Yellow Dog, Amis relocated from London to the beach resort of José Ignacio, Uruguay, with his family for two years, during which time he worked on his next novel away from the glare and pressures of the London literary scene.

In September 2006, upon his return from Uruguay, Amis published his eleventh novel. House of Meetings, a short work, continued the author's crusade against the crimes of Stalinism and also focused some consideration on the state of contemporary post-Soviet Russia. The novel centres on the relationship between two brothers incarcerated in a prototypical Siberian gulag who, prior to their deportation, had loved the same woman. House of Meetings saw some better critical notices than Yellow Dog had received three years before, but there were still some reviewers who felt that Amis's fiction work had considerably declined in quality. Despite the praise for House of Meetings, once again Amis was overlooked for the Booker Prize longlist. According to a piece in The Independent, the novel "was originally to have been collected alongside two short stories – one, a disturbing account of the life of a body-double in the court of Saddam Hussein; the other, the imagined final moments of Muhammad Atta, the leader of the 11 September attacks – but late in the process, Amis decided to jettison both from the book." The same article asserts that Amis had recently abandoned a novella, The Unknown Known (inspired by a phase used by Donald Rumsfeld), in which Muslim terrorists unleash a horde of compulsive rapists on Greeley, Colorado. (Note: As Amis explains in his essay "The Age of Horrorism" (reprinted in an amended form as "Terror and Boredom" in The Second Plane), he chose the US city of Greeley, Colorado, on account of its connection with Sayyid Qutb and the development of his jihadist convictions.) Instead he continued to work on a follow-up full novel that he had started working on in 2003:

The novel I'm working on is blindingly autobiographical, but with an Islamic theme. It's called A Pregnant Widow, because at the end of a revolution you don't have a newborn child, you have a pregnant widow. And the pregnant widow in this novel is feminism. Which is still in its second trimester. The child is nowhere in sight yet. And I think it has several more convulsions to undergo before we'll see the child.

The new novel took some considerable time to write: in 2008, Amis made the "terrible decision" to abandon his first version and a much-different Pregnant Widow was not published until 2010. Instead, Amis's last published work of the 2000s was the 2008 journalism collection The Second Plane, a collection which compiled Amis's many writings on the events of 9/11 and the subsequent major events and cultural issues resulting from the war on terror. The reception to The Second Plane was decidedly mixed, with some reviewers finding its tone intelligent and well reasoned, while others believed it to be excessively stylised and lacking in authoritative knowledge of key areas under consideration. The consensus was that the two short stories included were the weakest point of the collection. The work sold relatively well but was not well received, particularly in the United States.

=== 2010s and 2020s ===
In 2010, after a period of writing, rewriting, editing, and revision dating back to 2003, "by far the longest writing-time of all [his] books", Amis published The Pregnant Widow, a long novel concerned with the sexual revolution. Its title is based on a quote from Alexander Herzen: "The death of the contemporary forms of social order ought to gladden rather than trouble the soul. Yet what is frightening is that what the departing world leaves behind it is not an heir but a pregnant widow. Between the death of the one and the birth of the other, much water will flow by, a long night of chaos and desolation will pass."

The first public reading of the then just completed version of The Pregnant Widow occurred on 11 May 2009 as part of the Norwich and Norfolk festival. At this reading, according to the coverage of the event for the Writers' Centre Norwich by Katy Carr, "the writing shows a return to comic form, as the narrator muses on the indignities of facing the mirror as an ageing man, in a prelude to a story set in Italy in 1970, looking at the effect of the sexual revolution on personal relationships. The sexual revolution was the moment, as Amis sees it, that love became divorced from sex. He said he started to write the novel autobiographically, but then concluded that real life was too different from fiction and difficult to drum into novel shape, so he had to rethink the form."

The story is set in a castle owned by a cheese tycoon in Campania, Italy, where Keith Nearing, a 20-year-old English literature student; his girlfriend, Lily; and her friend, Scheherazade, are on holiday during the hot summer of 1970, the year that Amis says "something was changing in the world of men and women". The narrator is Keith's superego, or conscience, in 2009. Keith's sister, Violet, is based on Amis's own sister, Sally, described by Amis as one of the revolution's most spectacular victims.

Published in a whirl of publicity the likes of which Amis had not received for a novel since the publication of The Information in 1995, The Pregnant Widow was met by searing criticism, accusations of sexism, and guessing the real-world identity of its characters. Despite a vast amount of coverage, some positive reviews, and a widespread feeling that Amis's time for recognition had come, the novel was overlooked for the 2010 Man Booker Prize longlist. In 2010, Martin Amis was named GQ writer of the year.

In 2012 Amis published Lionel Asbo: State of England. The novel is centred on the lives of Desmond Pepperdine and his uncle Lionel Asbo, a voracious lout and persistent convict; for the benefit of his US readers, Amis explained the origin of the latter's surname in an interview with NPR. It is set against the fictional borough of Diston Town, a grotesque version of modern-day Britain under the reign of celebrity culture, and follows the dramatic events in the lives of both characters: Desmond's gradual erudition and maturing; and Lionel's fantastic lottery win of almost £140 million. Much to the interest of the press, Amis announced that the character of Lionel Asbo's eventual girlfriend, the ambitious glamour model and poet "Threnody" (quotation marks included), had been created to honour the British celebrity Jordan, whom he had a few years earlier summed up as "two bags of silicone". In an interview with Newsnight's Jeremy Paxman, Amis said the novel was "not a frowning examination of England" but a comedy based on a "fairytale world", adding that Lionel Asbo: State of England was not an attack on the country, insisting he was "proud of being English" and viewed the nation with affection. Reviews, once again, were mixed.

Amis's 2014 novel The Zone of Interest concerns the Holocaust, his second work of fiction to tackle the subject after Time's Arrow. In it, Amis endeavoured to imagine the social and domestic lives of the Nazi officers who ran the death camps, and the effect their indifference to human suffering had on their general psychology. It was shortlisted for the 2015 Walter Scott Prize for historical fiction and a 2023 film, "loosely based" on the novel, premiered to acclaim at the 2023 Cannes Film Festival, winning the Grand Prix.

In December 2016, Amis announced two new projects. The first, a collection of journalism, titled The Rub of Time: Bellow, Nabokov, Hitchens, Travolta, Trump. Essays and Reportage, 1986–2016, was published in October 2017. The second project, a new untitled novel which Amis was working on, was an autobiographical novel about three key literary figures in his life: the poet Philip Larkin, American novelist Saul Bellow, and noted public intellectual Christopher Hitchens. In an interview with livemint.com, Amis said of the novel-in-progress, "I'm writing an autobiographical novel that I've been trying to write for 15 years. It's not so much about me, it's about three other writers – a poet, a novelist and an essayist ... and since I started trying to write it, Larkin died in 1985, Bellow died in 2005, and Hitch died in 2011, and that gives me a theme, death, and it gives me a bit more freedom, and fiction is freedom. It's hard going but the one benefit is that I have the freedom to invent things. I don't have them looking over my shoulder anymore." The finished product, Inside Story – his first novel in six years – was published in September 2020.

=== Other work ===
Amis released two collections of short stories (Einstein's Monsters and Heavy Water) and five volumes of collected journalism and criticism (The Moronic Inferno, Visiting Mrs Nabokov, The War Against Cliché, The Second Plane and The Rub of Time). While he was writing Money, he wrote a guide to arcade video games of the 1970s and 1980s, Invasion of the Space Invaders.

Amis regularly appeared on television and radio discussion and debate programmes and contributed book reviews and articles to newspapers. His wife Isabel Fonseca released her debut novel Attachment in 2009 and two of Amis's children, his son Louis and his daughter Fernanda, have also been published in Standpoint magazine and The Guardian, respectively.

==== University of Manchester ====
In February 2007, Amis was appointed as a professor of creative writing at the Manchester Centre for New Writing at the University of Manchester, where he started in September 2007. He ran postgraduate seminars, and participated in four public events each year, including a two-week summer school.

Of his position, Amis said: "I may be acerbic in how I write but ... I would find it very difficult to say cruel things to [students] in such a vulnerable position. I imagine I'll be surprisingly sweet and gentle with them." He predicted that the experience might inspire him to write a new book, while adding sardonically: "A campus novel written by an elderly novelist, that's what the world wants." It was revealed that the salary paid to Amis by the university was £80,000 a year in return for 28 contracted hours. The Manchester Evening News broke the story saying that according to his contract Amis was paid £3,000 an hour for 28 contracted hours a year teaching. The claim was echoed in headlines in several national papers.

In January 2011, it was announced that Amis would be stepping down from his university position at the end of the current academic year. Of his time teaching creative writing at the University of Manchester, Amis was quoted as saying, "teaching creative writing at Manchester has been a joy" and that he had "become very fond of my colleagues, especially John McAuliffe and Ian McGuire". He added that he "loved doing all the reading and the talking; and I very much took to the Mancunians. They are a witty and tolerant contingent". Amis was succeeded in this position by the Irish writer Colm Tóibín in September 2011.

From October 2007 to July 2011, at the University of Manchester's Whitworth Hall and Cosmo Rodewald Concert Hall, Amis regularly engaged in public discussions with other experts on literature and various topics (21st-century literature, terrorism, religion, Philip Larkin, science, Britishness, suicide, sex, ageing, his 2010 novel The Pregnant Widow, violence, film, the short story, and America).

== Personal life ==
In 1974, by his own account, Amis had a "brief affair" with Lamorna Seale, who was married to the journalist and author Patrick Seale, who gave birth to his daughter, Delilah, in 1976. Lamorna Seale committed suicide in 1978.

Amis married the American academic Antonia Phillips in 1984 and they had two sons together. Towards the end of that marriage, he met the writer Isabel Fonseca, whom he married in 1996; together they had two daughters. He became a grandfather in 2008; he later described his new status as "like getting a telegram from the mortuary".

From 2004 to 2006, he lived with his second family in Uruguay, where Fonseca's father had been born. Upon returning, he said, "Some strange things have happened, it seems to me, in my absence. I didn't feel like I was getting more rightwing when I was in Uruguay, but when I got back I felt that I had moved quite a distance to the right while staying in the same place." He reported that he was disquieted by what he saw as increasingly undisguised hostility towards Israel and the United States.

In late 2010, Amis bought a brownstone residence in Cobble Hill, Brooklyn, although it was uncertain how much time he would be spending there. In 2012, Amis wrote in The New Republic that he was "moving house" from Camden Town in London to Cobble Hill. He also had a residence in Lake Worth Beach, Florida, United States.

=== Death ===
Amis died from oesophageal cancer at his home in Florida on 19 May 2023. Like his father, he died at age 73. Amis was a life-long smoker.

Amis was knighted in the 2023 King's Birthday Honours for services to literature, and the knighthood was backdated to the day before his death.

== Views ==
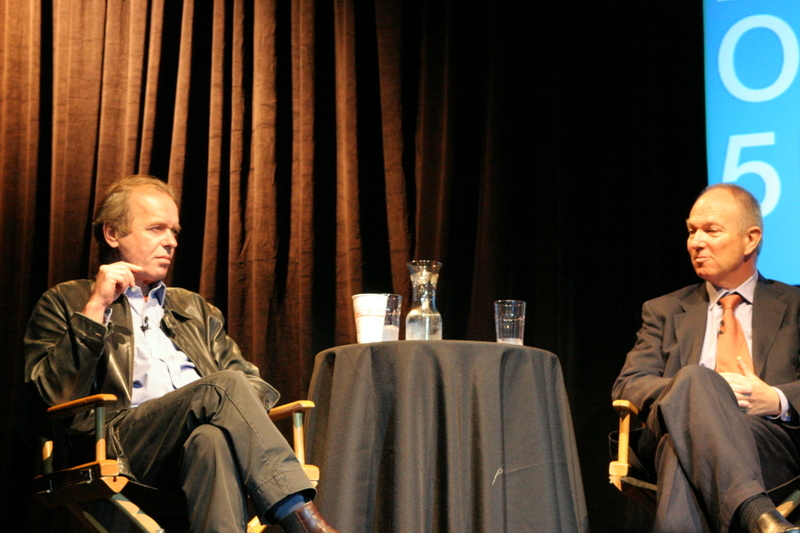
Amis conversing with Ian Buruma about Monsters at the 2007 New Yorker Festival

=== Writing ===
On writing, Amis said in 2014: "I think of writing as more mysterious as I get older, not less mysterious. The whole process is very weird ... It is very spooky."

Interviewed by Sebastian Faulks on BBC television in 2011, he said that unless he sustained a brain injury, it was unlikely he would write a children's book: "The idea of being conscious of who you're directing the story to is anathema to me, because, in my view, fiction is freedom and any restraints on that are intolerable ... I would never write about someone that forced me to write at a lower register than what I can write." The "brain injury" remark caused opprobrium among various children's authors, although the poet Roger McGough wagered that "if I gave him £100 to write a children's book I bet he'd do a good one".

=== Nuclear proliferation ===
Through the 1980s and 1990s, Amis was a strong critic of nuclear proliferation. His collection of five stories on this theme, Einstein's Monsters, began with a long essay entitled "Thinkability" in which he set out his views on the issue, writing: "Nuclear weapons repel all thought, perhaps because they can end all thought."

=== Geopolitics ===
In comments on the BBC in October 2006, Amis expressed his view that North Korea was the more dangerous of the two remaining members of the Axis of Evil, but that Iran was Britain's "natural enemy", suggesting that Britain should not feel bad about having "helped Iraq scrape a draw with Iran" in the Iran–Iraq War because a "revolutionary and rampant Iran would have been a much more destabilising presence".

=== Electoral politics ===
In June 2008, Amis endorsed the candidacy of Barack Obama for president of the United States, stating: "The reason I hope for Obama is that he alone has the chance to reposition America's image in the world." When briefly interviewed by the BBC during its coverage of the 2012 United States presidential election, Amis displayed a change in tone, stating that he was "depressed and frightened" by the US election, rather than excited. Blaming a "deep irrationality of the American people" for the apparent narrow gap between the candidates, Amis said the Republican Party had swung so far to the right that former president Ronald Reagan would be considered a "pariah" by the present party – and invited viewers to imagine a Conservative Party in the UK that had moved to the right so much that it disowned Margaret Thatcher. He said: "Tax cuts for the rich, there's not a democracy on earth where that would be mentioned!"

In 2015, Amis criticised Labour leader Jeremy Corbyn in an article for The Sunday Times, describing him as "humourless" and "under-educated". In the aftermath of the 2016 referendum, Amis said that the United Kingdom's decision to leave the European Union was a "self-inflicted wound" that had left him "depressed".

=== Islam and Islamism ===
On the day after the 2006 transatlantic aircraft plot came to light, Amis was interviewed by The Times Magazine about community relations in Britain and the alleged threat from Muslims; he was quoted as saying: "What can we do to raise the price of them doing this? There's a definite urge – don't you have it? – to say, 'The Muslim community will have to suffer until it gets its house in order.' What sort of suffering? Not letting them travel. Deportation – further down the road. Curtailing of freedoms. Strip-searching people who look like they're from the Middle East or from Pakistan ... Discriminatory stuff, until it hurts the whole community and they start getting tough with their children ... It's a huge dereliction on their part."

The interview provoked immediate controversy, much of it played out in the pages of The Guardian newspaper. The Marxist critic Terry Eagleton, in the 2007 introduction to his work Ideology, singled out and attacked Amis for this particular quote, saying that this view is "[n]ot the ramblings of a British National Party thug, ... but the reflections of Martin Amis, leading luminary of the English metropolitan literary world". In a highly critical Guardian article, entitled "The absurd world of Martin Amis", satirist Chris Morris likened Amis to the Muslim cleric Abu Hamza (who was jailed for inciting racial hatred in 2006), suggesting that both men employed "mock erudition, vitriol and decontextualised quotes from the Koran" to incite hatred.

Elsewhere, Amis was especially careful to distinguish between Islam and radical Islamism, stating: "We can begin by saying, not only that we respect Muhammad, but that no serious person could fail to respect Muhammad – a unique and luminous historical being ... Judged by the continuities he was able to set in motion, Muhammad has strong claims to being the most extraordinary man who ever lived... But Islamism? No, we can hardly be asked to respect a creedal wave that calls for our own elimination ... Naturally we respect Islam. But we do not respect Islamism, just as we respect Muhammad and do not respect Mohamed Atta."

On terrorism, Amis wrote that he suspected "there exists on our planet a kind of human being who will become a Muslim in order to pursue suicide-mass murder", and added: "I will never forget the look on the gatekeeper's face, at the Dome of the Rock in Jerusalem, when I suggested, perhaps rather airily, that he skip some calendric prohibition and let me in anyway. His expression, previously cordial and cold, became a mask; and the mask was saying that killing me, my wife, and my children was something for which he now had warrant."

His views on radical Islamism earned him the contentious sobriquet "Blitcon" (British literary neoconservative) from Ziauddin Sardar, who labelled Amis as such in the New Statesman. (Note: The New Statesman article also assigned the "Blitcon" label to Salman Rushdie and Ian McEwan.)

=== Euthanasia ===
Amis aroused a new controversy in 2010 with his comments regarding euthanasia during an interview, when he said that he thought Britain faced a "civil war" between the young and the elderly in society within 10 or 15 years, and called for public euthanasia "booths". Of the geriatric cohort, he declared: "They'll be a population of demented very old people, like an invasion of terrible immigrants, stinking out the restaurants and cafes and shops. ... there should be a booth on every corner where you could get a martini and a medal." (Note: One of the books that Amis reviewed for The Observer in 1972 was Kurt Vonnegut's Welcome to the Monkey House, the title story of which features an over-populated Earth with ubiquitous government-run "Ethical Suicide Parlors".)

=== Agnosticism ===
In 2006, Amis said that "agnostic is the only respectable position, simply because our ignorance of the universe is so vast" that atheism is "premature". He added that "there's not going to be any kind of anthropomorphic entity at all", but the universe is "so incredibly complicated" and "so over our heads" that we cannot exclude the existence of "an intelligence" behind it.

In 2010, Amis said: "I'm an agnostic, which is the only rational position. It's not because I feel a God or think that anything resembling the banal God of religion will turn up. But I think that atheism sounds like a proof of something, and it's incredibly evident that we are nowhere near intelligent enough to understand the universe ... Writers are above all individualists, and above all writing is freedom, so they will go off in all sorts of directions. I think it does apply to the debate about religion, in that it's a crabbed novelist who pulls the shutters down and says, there's no other thing. Don't use the word God: but something more intelligent than us ... If we can't understand it, then it's formidable. And we understand very little."

== Bibliography ==
The most complete list of Amis's books appears at https://martinamisweb.com/bookshelf/.

A comprehensive list of Amis's nonfiction essays, reviews, and profiles can be assembled from two sections in The Cambridge Companion to Martin Amis (2026, pp. 228–37, especially 229–31) and Martin Amis: Postmodernism and Beyond (2006, pp. 211–34). The bibliography page of the Martin Amis Web provides the most complete online rendition of that material. https://martinamisweb.com/bibliographies/

=== Novels ===
Amis published 15 novels:

- The Rachel Papers (1973: ISBN 9780224009126)
- Dead Babies (1975: ISBN 9780224011679)
- Success (1978: ISBN 9780224015714)
- Other People: A Mystery Story (1981: ISBN 9780224017664)
- Money: A Suicide Note (1984: ISBN 9780099461883)
- London Fields (1989: ISBN 9780224026093)
- Time's Arrow: Or the Nature of the Offence (1991: ISBN 9780670843664)
- The Information (1995: ISBN 9780002253567)
- Night Train (1997: ISBN 9780224050180)
- Yellow Dog (2003: ISBN 9780224050616)
- House of Meetings (2006 : ISBN 9780224076098)
- The Pregnant Widow (2010: ISBN 9780224076128)
- Lionel Asbo: State of England (2012: ISBN 9780224096218)
- The Zone of Interest (2014: ISBN 9780385353496)
- Inside Story (2020: ISBN 9780593318294)

=== Short fiction ===
Collections

- Einstein's Monsters (1987: ISBN 9780099768913)
- Two Stories (1994: ISBN 9781898154044; both later collected in Heavy Water and Other Stories)
- God's Dice (1995: ISBN 9780146000546; two stories reprinted from Einstein's Monsters, part of the Penguin 60s series)
- Heavy Water and Other Stories (1998: ISBN 9780609601297)
- Amis Omnibus (omnibus) (1999)
- Vintage Amis (2004)

Stories

Title	Year	First published	Reprinted/collected	Notes
Oktober	2015	Amis, Martin (December 7, 2015). "Oktober". The New Yorker. Vol. 91, no. 39. pp. 64–71.		

=== Non-fiction ===
Books

- Invasion of the Space Invaders (1982: ISBN 9780458953509)
- The Moronic Inferno: And Other Visits to America (1986: ISBN 9780670814329)
- Visiting Mrs Nabokov: And Other Excursions (1993: ISBN 9780224038249)
- Experience (2000: ISBN 9780224061254)
- The War Against Cliché: Essays and Reviews 1971–2000 (2001: ISBN 9780099422228)
- Koba the Dread: Laughter and the Twenty Million (2002: ISBN 9780786868766)
- The Second Plane (2008: ISBN 9780099488699)
- The Rub of Time: Bellow, Nabokov, Hitchens, Travolta, Trump. Essays and Reportage, 1986–2016 (2017: ISBN 9780099488729)

Essays and reporting

- Amis, Martin (August 29, 2022). "The Queen's heart : in time for her Golden Jubilee, two biographies of Elizabeth II". The Critics. Books. May 20, 2002. The New Yorker. Vol. 98, no. 26. pp. 60–62, 64–65. (Note: Online version is titled "Elizabeth II's fine-tuned feelings".) (Note: Originally published in the May 20, 2002 issue.)

=== Screenplays ===
- Saturn 3 (1980)
- London Fields (2018; with Roberta Hanley)

———————

Bibliography notes

== Themes and style ==
Martin Amis's fiction is characterized by dark satire, metafictional techniques, and a fascination with cultural decadence. His protagonists often wrestle with identity, self-destruction, and moral vacuity, reflecting Amis's preoccupation with entropy and decline in modern Western society. His writing is known for its linguistic flair—featuring neologisms, irony, and elaborate sentence constructions—and for a tone that oscillates between comic absurdity and existential seriousness. Critics have grouped his novels Money, London Fields, and The Information into a “London Trilogy,” defined by their scathing portrayal of consumerism, gender politics, and creative envy.
