= Reverse chronology =

Narrative or analytical structure in reverse order to the plot or flow of time

Reverse chronology is a narrative structure and method of storytelling whereby the plot is revealed in reverse order. In a story employing this technique, the first scene shown is actually the conclusion to the plot. Once that scene ends, the penultimate scene is shown, and so on, so that the final scene the viewer sees is the first chronologically. Many stories employ flashback, showing prior events, but whereas the scene order of most conventional films is A-B-C-etc., a film in reverse chronology goes Z-Y-X-etc.

In non-fiction and academic writing, the term counter-chronology is sometimes used to describe hermeneutic analysis conducted against the flow of time.

== Purpose ==
A narrative that employs reverse chronology presents effects before causes, asking the audience to piece together information about character motivations and the plot and encouraging them to ask themselves questions like "is this why she acted this way?" Scenes set in the past are interpreted in light of information the viewer has already learned from scenes set in the future, giving the audience a degree of narrative agency.

== Examples of use ==
=== In literature ===
The epic poem Aeneid, written by Virgil in the 1st century BC, uses reverse chronology within scenes. Polish novelist Boleslaw Prus uses this technique in a short episode of The Doll (1890) when the entire life of one of the protagonists, Ignacy Rzecki, is rolling back in the front of his eyes, from the current moment back to his childhood, while he is dying. The action of W. R. Burnett's novel, Goodbye to the Past (1934), moves continually from 1929 to 1873. The Long View (1956) by Elizabeth Jane Howard describes a marriage in reverse chronology from 1950s London back to its beginning in 1926. Edward Lewis Wallant uses flashbacks in reverse chronology in The Human Season (1960). The novel Christopher Homm (1965), by C. H. Sisson, is also told in reverse chronology.

Philip K. Dick, in his 1967 novel Counter-Clock World, describes a future in which time has started to move in reverse, resulting in the dead reviving in their own graves ("old-birth"), living their lives in reverse, eventually ending in returning to the womb, and splitting into an egg and a sperm during copulation between a recipient woman and a man. The novel was expanded from Dick's short story "Your Appointment Will Be Yesterday", first published in the August 1966 edition of Amazing Stories.

Iain Banks's novel Use of Weapons (1990) interweaves two parallel stories, one told in standard chronology and one in reverse, both concluding at a critical moment in the main character's life.

Martin Amis's 1991 novel Time's Arrow tells the story of a man who, it seems, brings dead people to life. Eventually it is revealed that the story is being seen backwards, and he was a doctor at Auschwitz who brought death to live people. He escaped to the United States, and the novel starts with his death and ends with his birth. Amis writes in the Afterword that he had a "certain paragraph" from Kurt Vonnegut's Slaughterhouse Five (1969) in mind. As he waits to be taken by aliens to the planet Tralfamadore, the protagonist, Billy Pilgrim, watches a war movie backwards. American planes full of holes fly backwards as German planes suck bullets from them; bombers take their bombs back to base where they are returned to the States, reduced to ore and buried. The American fliers became high school kids again, and, Billy guesses, Hitler ultimately returns to babyhood.

Julia Alvarez's novel How the García Girls Lost Their Accents (1991) opens in 1989 with one of the characters returning to her native Dominican Republic. The story of why the family left and their attempts to succeed in New York are told in reverse chronological order, with the last events happening in 1956.

The Night Watch (2006) by Sarah Waters is written in three episodes moving backwards from 1947 to 1941, beginning in post-war London and moving back to the early days of the war. It was shortlisted for both the 2006 Man Booker Prize and the 2006 Orange Prize. All the Birds, Singing (2013) by the Australian author Evie Wyld, relates two stories in parallel, both beginning from the same point in time, one running forwards and one backwards. The novel won the 2014 Miles Franklin Award and the 2014 Encore Award. Jeffery Deaver's mystery thriller The October List (2013) is told entirely in reversed order (from 6:30 PM on Sunday to 8:20 AM on Friday) followed by the Introduction at the end of the book.

Baoshu's story "What Has Passed Shall in Kinder Light Appear" is set in the context of Chinese (and world) history running backward from 2008 until the 1930s. However, the personal lives of individual characters move forward alongside the reversed flow of history.

In nonfiction, at least two major biographies address their subjects using reverse chronology. Charles Seife's biography of Stephen Hawking, Hawking Hawking (2021), and Edmund Morris' Edison (2019), about Thomas Edison, begin from their subjects' deaths and work backward in time throughout the books.

=== In theatre ===
A number of plays have employed this technique. George S. Kaufman and Moss Hart's 1934 play, Merrily We Roll Along, is told in reverse order, as is the Harold Pinter play Betrayal (1978). Kaufman and Hart's play was adapted as a musical comedy by Stephen Sondheim in 1981, and Pinter's play was made into a film in 1983.

Jason Robert Brown's 2001 two-person musical The Last Five Years chronicles the half-decade course of a romantic relationship through solo musical numbers alternating between the two lovers. One character's songs are presented in reverse chronology; their timelines intersect midway through, in the show's only duet. Richard LaGravenese directed Anna Kendrick and Jeremy Jordan in a 2014 film adapation.

=== In Film ===
Jean Epstein's La glace à trois faces (The Three-Sided Mirror) (1927) features a sequence where the events happen in reverse, beginning with the protagonist's exit from a room until the viewer sees the entrance.

The Czech comedy Happy End (1967) is a farce which starts with a guillotined man finding his head popped back on his shoulders and ends with him as a young child.

Atom Egoyan, influenced by Pinter's plays, tells the story of The Sweet Hereafter (1997) in reverse chronology, with the first scene of the film set in 1977 and the last in 1968.

The popular Indian actor-director Upendra, from Karnataka, used a reverse-chronology screenplay in his movie A (1998). The entire film is a psychological thriller that uses a non-linear narrative, with flashbacks within flashbacks and a reverse screenplay structure, to tell the story of a film director and an actress. The reverse screenplay made the audience watch the film multiple times to piece together the story and understand the characters' motivations and the film's deeper themes.

Peppermint Candy (1999), by South Korean director Lee Chang-dong, begins with the protagonist, Yongho, disrupting a class reunion, then climbing onto nearby railroad tracks where he waits for a train to hit him, screaming "I want to go back!" right before it does (not shown on camera). The film then shows earlier periods of Yongho's life, each time preceded by a view of him on the tracks from further away, as the experiences that made him disillusioned and suicidal are revealed, culminating in him as an idealistic young man optimistic about his future at his class's graduation at the same riverfront park.

The technique was used in Jean-Luc Godard's short film De l'origine du XXIe siècle pour moi (2000).

Memento (2000), a mystery directed by Christopher Nolan, features a man with anterograde amnesia, meaning he is unable to form new memories. The film parallels the protagonist's perspective by unfolding in reverse chronological order, leaving the audience as ignorant of the events that occurred prior to each scene (which, played in reverse chronological order, will not be revealed until later) as the protagonist is.

In Irréversible (2002), directed by Gaspar Noe, an act of homicidal violence takes place at the start of the movie (i.e., it is the final event to take place). During the remainder of the film, we learn not only that the violence is an act of vengeance, but what exactly is being avenged. The film was highly controversial for its graphic nature; had the scenes been shown in chronological order, this violent content would make it a simple, and pointlessly brutal, revenge movie. However, as it is, told in reverse, the audience is made to consider the exact consequences of each action, and there is often "more than meets the eye." The technique is used so thoroughly that the end credits are not only shown at the beginning of the movie, but they roll down the screen, rather than upwards as is familiar.

5x2 (2004), directed by François Ozon, tells the story of a relationship between two people in five episodes using reverse chronology.

In Eternal Sunshine of the Spotless Mind (2004), a main substory is told in reverse.

In the movie P.S. I Love You (2007), the scenes in which Gerry Kennedy (Gerard Butler) meets and courts Holly (Hilary Swank) are shown in reverse.

The Life of Chuck (2024), an adaptation of the 2020 novella of the same name by Stephen King, has been presented in reverse chronological order as well.

=== Television ===
The made-for-television drama Two Friends (1986), by Jane Campion, and the 1997 episode, "The Betrayal", of the hit sitcom Seinfeld, employs the technique. The Seinfeld episode is a take-off of the Harold Pinter play Betrayal and has a character named "Pinter."

"Redrum", a 2000 episode of The X-Files, uses the technique in focusing on a character experiencing the events in reverse along with the audience. The 2002 ER episode "Hindsight" uses reverse chronology to illustrate the events leading to traumatic car accident. A 1997 Star Trek: Voyager episode, "Before and After", which writer Kenneth Biller claimed was based on a Martin Amis novel Time's Arrow, also features a character experiencing the events in reverse along with the audience. The Sealab 2021 episode "Shrabster" is also in reverse order. For a few seasons, the revived Doctor Who had an extensive storyline focusing on a relationship between the Doctor and his companions' daughter (River Song) from the future based on "opposite timelines" (i.e., as the Doctor was travelling through time on one path, River was travelling on an opposite path) causing them to interact in opposite chronological order. The British police drama Rellik ("killer" spelled backwards) begins with the police killing the murder suspect; the crimes and investigation are shown in reverse order from there, ending with the childhood trauma that led the killer to his path. In 2018, the episode "Once Removed", from the series Inside No. 9 uses reverse chronology to tell a dark story about a family who is moving house, and the murder that subsequently begins. Also from 2018, the second installment of the FX anthology series American Crime Story focuses on the assassination of designer Gianni Versace, employing reverse chronology through the course of several episodes to explore the background of Versace's killer Andrew Cunanan.

== See also ==
- In medias res
- Nonlinear narrative
