= Lionel Asbo: State of England =

2012 novel by Martin Amis

- Author: Martin Amis
- Language: English
- Genre: Dark comedy
- Publisher: Jonathan Cape
- Publication date: 7 June 2012
- Pages: 255
- ISBN: 978-0-224-09621-8
- OCLC: 776772658
- Dewey Decimal: 823/.914 21

Lionel Asbo: State of England is a novel by the English author Martin Amis, published in 2012.

== Synopsis ==
Desmond Pepperdine, a teen resident of the hopeless borough of Diston Town, shares the home of his late mother with his uncle, the implacably yobbish Lionel Asbo. Despite the latter's attempts to educate his nephew according to his crude and malicious principles (including putting dogs on Tabasco sauce diets and preferring porn over real women), Desmond's interests lead him in a completely different direction. He learns how to write properly and how to read something other than a tabloid, and he experiences a sort of Distonite renaissance. He also meets Dawn Sheringham, a kind-hearted and intelligent girl, who becomes his first actual girlfriend. Meanwhile, during one of his casual sentences in prison, Lionel Asbo is informed that he has just won £139,999,999.50 on the National Lottery. He soon joins the disreputable club of British Lotto Louts, laying his hand on every piece of extravagant and boisterous merchandise available, and placing himself in the company of his peers, namely, other redundant celebrities. His immense wealth invokes in him absolutely no sense of charity, even though many in his family are in dire need of financial help. Glamour model and aspiring poet "Threnody" becomes his new girlfriend, at least as long as it serves their mutual interest to become the nation's favourites. All this wouldn't matter much to Desmond, but for a single unfortunate mistake that threatens all his chances of overcoming Diston Town.

== Reception ==
Critical reception for the book was mixed, with some reviewers criticising Amis's repeated use of old plot schemes and character types. Novelist Nicola Barker praised the book in The Guardian, describing Lionel Asbo as "a Big Mac made from filet mignon."
