= The Moronic Inferno =

1st edition (Publ.Jonathan Cape)

The Moronic Inferno: And Other Visits to America (1986) is a collection of non-fiction essays on the subject of America, by the British novelist Martin Amis.

== Amis on The Moronic Inferno ==
In the book's introduction, Amis reveals that he had been asked to write a book about America on previous occasions, but that The Moronic Inferno had come together "unpremeditated, accidental, and in installments" while he was "upending [his] desk drawer to prepare a collection of occasional journalism". The 'Moronic Inferno' of the title is a phrase that Amis acknowledges is derived from a line by Saul Bellow, who in turn had borrowed it from the British author Wyndham Lewis.

== Essays ==
The twenty-six articles collected, many of which are expanded from their original forms and containing postscripts commenting on subsequent developments after publication, are drawn from Amis' numerous contributions to The Observer, the New Statesman, The Sunday Telegraph Magazine, the London Review of Books, Tatler, and Vanity Fair between 1977–85. The articles consider, among other things, American politics, major literary figures, the evangelical Christianity movement, cinema, sex, and numerous facets of popular culture.

== Reception ==
In the New Statesman, Jason Cowley wrote, "In journalistic mode, Amis is without peer: when he writes about writers — indeed, when he writes about anyone, such as Hugh Hefner — the long profile becomes, in his hands, a capacious, infinitely flexible form in which to combine reportage, criticism, humour, exalted phrase-making, and a clear-eyed, penetrating sense of purpose...Not a month passes, but I encounter someone who has read, and been influenced by, The Moronic Inferno and Other Visits to America, a collection of journalism first published in 1986, but one that continues to enjoy a radiant afterlife. The Moronic Inferno includes some of the best profiles of writers ever written. They are as memorable as any postwar literary essay I have read." In his study Understanding Martin Amis, critic James Diedrick called the book, "A superb collection."

== The articles ==
- "Saul Bellow and the Moronic Inferno" [London Review of Books, 1982 and Observer, 1984]
- "The Killings in Atlanta" [Observer, 1981]
- "Truman Capote: Knowing Everybody" [Tatler, 1978 and Observer, 1985]
- "Philip Roth: No Satisfaction" [New Statesman, 1978 and Observer, 1984]
- "Elvis Presley: He Did It His Way" [Observer, 1981]
- "Diana Trilling at Claremont Avenue" [Observer, 1982]
- "Norman Mailer: The Avenger and the Bitch" [Observer 1981, 1982, and 1985]
- "Palm Beach: Don't You Love It?" [Tatler, 1979]
- "Brian DePalma: The Movie Brute" [Vanity Fair, 1984]
- "Here's Ronnie: On the Road with Reagan" [Sunday Telegraph, 1979]
- "Mr. Vidal: Unpatriotic Gore" [Sunday Telegraph, 1977, and Observer, 1982]
- "Too Much Monkey Business: The New Evangelical Right" [Observer, 1980]
- "Vidal v. Falwell" [Observer, 1982]
- "Joseph Heller, Giantslayer" [Observer, 1984]
- "Newspeak at Vanity Fair" [Observer, 1983]
- "Kurt Vonnegut: After the Slaughterhouse" [Observer, 1983]
- "Gloria Steinem and the Feminist Utopia" [Observer, 1984]
- "William Burroughs: The Bad Bits" [New Statesman, 1977]
- "Steven Spielberg: Boyish Wonder" [Observer, 1982]
- "John Updike: Rabbitland and Bechville" [Observer, 1982 and 1983]
- "Joan Didion's Style" [London Review of Books, 1980]
- "In Hefnerland" [Observer, 1985]
- "Paul Theroux's Enthusiasms" [Observer, 1985]
- "Gay Talese: Sex-Affirmative" [Observer, 1980]
- "Double Jeopardy: Making Sense of AIDS" [Observer, 1985]
- "Saul Bellow in Chicago" [Observer, 1983]
