= House of Meetings =

2006 novel by Martin Amis

- First edition cover
- Author: Martin Amis
- Illustrator: Peter Mendelsund and Chip Kidd (US edition)
- Language: English
- Publisher: Jonathan Cape
- Publication date: 2006
- Publication place: United Kingdom
- Media type: Print (Hardback)
- Pages: 198

House of Meetings, by Martin Amis, is a 2006 novel about two brothers who share a common love interest while living in a Soviet gulag during the last decade of Stalin's rule. This novel was written by Amis during a two-year-long self-imposed exile in Uruguay following the release and tepid reception afforded to his 2003 novel Yellow Dog. The writing of House of Meetings "precipitated (another) creative crisis" for Amis, which Amis reflected upon in 2010:

"You see those Posy Simmonds cartoons of people by the pool having cocktails and saying into the Dictaphone, 'On the second day, the last child died,'" he says. "And I was in Uruguay, with my beautiful wife and beautiful daughters, living a completely stressless life. So I had to do my suffering on the page and, Christ, did I do it. I was very nervous about that book."

== Plot summary ==
The novel centers on the modern-day (2004) recollections of the unnamed narrator/protagonist of his time spent in an Arctic gulag and the years that followed. The recollections are presented in the form of a memoir sent to the narrator's American stepdaughter, Venus. One of the primary plot elements is the complex relationship between the protagonist and his younger half-brother, Lev, who later joins him in the camp. Through many difficult revelations and trials, they eventually survive the harsh conditions of the camp and then must face a further challenge: re–acclimatizing to everyday life.

== Literary significance and criticism ==
The novel's release was greeted with generally positive reviews; see, e.g., The Economist's October review. In Literary Review, Sam Leith wrote: “Amis mistakes the nature of his own talent. His Dickensian comic mode is his strongest suit – gravitas or moral clairvoyancy his shortest. But Amis still fails more interestingly than most of his peers succeed.”
