= Manchester Centre for New Writing =

The University of Manchester's Centre for New Writing runs taught MA courses and PhD research programmes in creative and critical writing. According to its website, it was "formed to develop and refine postgraduate and undergraduate students' writing, and explore and research collaboration between creative and critical work."

It has a staff of distinguished writers including the novelists M. J. Hyland and Martin Amis, whose appointment as Professor of Creative Writing was announced in February 2007. Amis was succeeded by Irish novelist and essayist Colm Toibin in October 2011, and Toibin was subsequently replaced by the current professor, Jeanette Winterson.

The Centre also runs the 'Literature Live' series of events, in which well known contemporary novelists and poets read from and discuss their work with an audience of students and members of the public.

In October 2008 the Centre for New Writing launched a new cultural journal The Manchester Review, which aims to "nurture and promote the best emerging talent as well as featuring new work by leading writers and artists."
