= Money (novel) =

1984 novel by Martin Amis

- Author: Martin Amis
- Language: English
- Genre: Novel
- Publisher: Jonathan Cape
- Publication date: 1984
- Media type: Print (hardcover and paperback)
- Pages: 368 (first hardcover edition)

Money: A Suicide Note is a 1984 novel by Martin Amis. It follows John Self, an advertising director whose hedonism and compulsive spending propel a chaotic transatlantic film project and a personal unravelling. The novel is based on Amis's experience as a script writer on the 1980 science fiction film Saturn 3. Contemporary and later critics have frequently read the book as a sharp satire of 1980s consumer and media culture.

In 2005, Time included Money on its List of the 100 Best Novels published in the English language between 1923 and 2005. The novel was dramatised by the BBC in 2010.

== Plot summary ==
Money tells the story of, and is narrated by, John Self, a successful director of commercials who is invited to New York City by Fielding Goodney, a film producer, to shoot his first film. Self is an archetypal hedonist and slob: he is usually drunk, and an avid consumer of pornography and prostitutes; he eats too much; above all, encouraged by Goodney, he spends too much.

The actors in the film, which Self originally titles Good Money but which he eventually wants to rename Bad Money, all have emotional issues that cause them to clash with each other and with their roles. For example, the strict Christian Spunk Davis is asked to play a drugs pusher; the ageing hardman Lorne Guyland has to be physically assaulted; the motherly Caduta Massi, who is insecure about her body, is asked to appear in a sex scene with Lorne, whom she detests.

While Self is in New York he is stalked by "Frank the Phone", a menacing misfit who threatens him over a series of telephone conversations, apparently because Self personifies the success that Frank has been unable to attain. Self is not frightened of Frank, even after Frank beats him up during an alcoholic bender. Self, characteristically, is unable to remember how he was attacked. Towards the end of the book Self arranges to meet Frank for a showdown, which is the beginning of the novel's shocking denouement. Money is similar to Amis's later novel London Fields in having a major plot twist.

Self returns to London before filming begins, revealing more of his humble origins, his landlord father Barry (who makes his contempt for his son clear by invoicing him for every penny spent on his upbringing) and pub doorman Fat Vince. Self discovers that his London girlfriend, Selina, is having an affair with Ossie Twain, while Self is attracted to Martina, Twain's wife in New York. This increases Self's psychosis and makes his downfall even more brutal.

After Selina carries out a plot to destroy any chance of a relationship between him and Martina, Self discovers that all his credit cards have been blocked, and, after confronting Frank, the stars of the film angrily claim that there is no film. It is revealed that Goodney had been manipulating him: all the contracts signed by Self were loans and debts, and Goodney fabricated the entire film. He is also revealed to be Frank. He supposedly chose Self for his behaviour on the first plane to America, where Goodney was sitting close to him. Felix, a bellhop, helps Self to escape from an angry mob in the hotel lobby and fly back to England, only to discover that Barry is not his real father.

Amis writes himself into the novel as a kind of overseer and confidant in Self's final breakdown. He is an arrogant character, and Self is not afraid to express his rather low opinion of Amis, such as the fact that he earns so much yet "lives like a student". Amis, among others, tries to warn Self that he is heading for destruction, but to no avail. Felix becomes Self's only real friend in America and finally makes Self realise how much trouble he has: "Man, you are out for a whole lot of money."

The novel's subtitle, "A Suicide Note", is clarified at the end. It is revealed that John Self's real father is Fat Vince and that John Self no longer exists. Amis indicates that this cessation of John Self's existence is analogous to suicide, which results in the death of the self.

After learning that his father is Fat Vince, John realises that his true identity is that of Fat John, half-brother of Fat Paul. The novel ends with Fat John having lost all his money (if it ever existed), yet he is still able to laugh at himself and is cautiously optimistic about his future.

== Background ==
The novel is derived in part from Amis's experience working on the film Saturn 3, of which he was scriptwriter. The character of Lorne Guyland was based on the star of the film, Kirk Douglas. His name is a play on the manner in which Long Island – where the character resides – is pronounced in certain New York-area accents. Amis said of his work "Money makes a break from the English tradition of sending a foreigner abroad in that (a) John Self is half American, and (b) as a consequence cannot be scandalized by America. You know the usual Pooterish Englishman who goes abroad in English novels and is taken aback by everything. Well, not a bit of that in John Self. He completely accepts America on its own terms and is perfectly at home with it."

== Reception ==
Writing for Time in 2010, David Lipsky called Money "the best celebrity novel I know: the stars who demand and wheedle their way across his plot seem less like caricature and more like photorealism every year."

Contemporary reviews praised the novel’s energy and satiric bite. In The New York Times, Veronica Geng called Money “a great addiction,” noting its manic voice and meticulously staged set-pieces. In The Times Literary Supplement, Eric Korn emphasized the prose’s showmanship and comic brio.

Later accounts have continued to position Money as a defining novel of 1980s Britain and a touchstone of Amis’s career. In 2005, it was included on Time's List of the 100 Best Novels published in the English language between 1923 and 2005 Writing on the 2010 BBC adaptation, reviewers revisited the novel’s status as a period-defining satire of “greed and excess.”

== 2010 BBC television adaptation ==
On 11 November 2009 The Guardian reported that the BBC had adapted Money for television as part of their early 2010 schedule for BBC 2. The two-part BBC Two adaptation aired in May 2010, starring Nick Frost as John Self and Vincent Kartheiser as Fielding Goodney. Contemporary reviews were mixed: some critics found the production watchable but felt it softened the novel’s venom. Emma Pierson played Selina Street, and Jerry Hall played Caduta Massi.
