= Counter-Clock World =

1967 novel by Philip K. Dick

- Cover of first edition (paperback)
- Author: Philip K. Dick
- Language: English
- Genre: Science fiction
- Publisher: Berkley Books
- Publication date: 1967
- Publication place: United States
- Media type: Print (hardback & paperback)
- Pages: 160

Counter-Clock World is a 1967 science fiction novel by American author Philip K. Dick. It was expanded from his short story "Your Appointment Will Be Yesterday", first published in the August 1966 edition of Amazing Stories.

The novel describes a future in which time has started to move in reverse, resulting in the dead reviving in their own graves ("old-birth"), living their lives in reverse, and eventually returning to the womb where they split into an egg and a sperm during copulation between a recipient woman and a man.

== Plot summary ==
The story takes place in a (then-future) fictional 1998, and centers on Anarch Peak, a black religious leader who had died in 1971 and is expected to rise soon. Sebastian Hermes, an owner of a small Vitarium (a business that digs up the dead and gives them the treatment they need before returning them to society), discovers Peak's resurrection is imminent. After accidentally discovering the burial place of Peak, he decides, against the law, to dig up the body before the Anarch awakes. (As with contemporary controversies about brain death, it seems not to be judged morally significant if a heartbeat can be heard, but it is illegal to dig anyone up before they start talking, which suggests resumed brain function is a marker of "old-birth.")

Various groups are interested in controlling the affairs of the 'old-born', such as the Vitaria (technically, a person resurrected is in the legal custody of their Vitarium until claimed by family members) and the Library, an organization dedicated to erasing books which have passed beyond the initial date at which they were written.

Religious institutions are also interested in 'old-birth', particularly in the resurrection of Anarch Peak in the case of the Udites (an African-American religion) and The Rome Syndicate (the highest authority in Caucasian matters, as well as the owner of numerous religious artifacts and other items, like a syringe that can stop the Hobart Phase for short periods of time). These factions then argue over the ownership of Anarch Peak after his resurrection. When the Library kidnaps Anarch Peak, both factions send Sebastian Hermes to recover him. In the end Peak is killed and there may be an interracial war as a consequence of Peak's permanent death.

=== The Hobart Phase ===
The Hobart Phase is the new order of life where people rise from the dead and are rejuvenated. Time reversal apparently began in 1986. Other than aging, Hobart Phase resurrection has changed nutritional and excretion processes and associated social taboos. People do not eat, but instead consume "Sogum" anally through a pipe, and later "plop" out food orally, which is done in private, due to its 'shameful' nature. As for smoking, cigarettes are no longer smoked, but the smoke instead blown back into them, making them grow back to normal size (this also clears and freshens the air). "Goodbye" and "hello" have reversed their order within standard greetings, and "food" is used as a drop-in replacement for the expletive "shit". It is stated that Mars colonists do not have the Hobart Phase on their world, and it is limited to Earth, and presumably its lunar colonies as well.

=== Divided USA ===
As hinted in the book, the United States of America has been partitioned into eastern and western segments. Hawaii and Alaska have also seceded from the WUS and FNM, but this is only mentioned in passing. In the WUS (Western United States), California is predominantly white, while the eastern "Free Negro Municipality" (FNM) is inhabited by African Americans. The fictitious religion of Uditi is the national religion of the East. Uditi is an offshoot of Christianity with apparent influences from Roman Catholicism and the Rastafari movement, and is centered on "the udi", an experience of a group mind.

Inhabitants of the WUS view the religion with suspicion, and it is hinted that their media demonizes its adherents. Library-sanctioned murders and civil unrest are claimed to be the works of religious fanatics. FNM currency is claimed to be worthless, as is WUS currency (stated earlier in the book), but its citizens ignore this due to patriotism.

== Bibliography ==
- Rickman, Gregg (1989). Philip K. Dick, a life, 1928-1962. Long Beach, Calif.: Fragments West/The Valentine Press. ISBN 9780916063245.
- Butler, Andrew M. (2001). Philip K. Dick. Pocket Essentials. ISBN 9781903047293.
- Mackey, Douglas A (1988). Philip K. Dick. Boston: Twayne. ISBN 0805775153.

== See also ==
- Reverse chronology
