= Experience (book) =

Book of memoirs by Martin Amis

- Author: Martin Amis
- Language: English
- Genre: Memoir
- Publisher: Jonathan Cape
- Publication date: 2000
- Media type: Print (hardback · paperback)
- Pages: 416
- ISBN: 0224050605
- OCLC: 44155012

Experience is a memoir by Martin Amis, published in 2000. The book was written primarily in response to the 1995 death of Amis's father, the famed author Kingsley Amis, who died in 1995.

== Reception ==
James Wood wrote in The Guardian: "Experience is a beautiful, and beautifully strange book, and it is unlike anything one expected." Terence Baker, in The Sunday Times, called it a "careful, heartfelt tribute". Jackie Wullschlager wrote in the Financial Times: "The core here is family, and it is movingly, beautifully, evoked... The raw materials – neurotic, outrageous genius of a father; gorgeous earth-mother Hilly; sophisticated step-mother Elizabeth Jane Howard; stunning girlfriends dropped along the way like a shattering string of pearls; an unknown daughter emerging at 18 – are unbeatable, and Amis makes of them a loving, perceptive, comic portrait."

== Awards ==
Experience was awarded the 2000 James Tait Black Memorial Prize for biography.

== See also ==
- Sally Amis
