= London Fields (novel) =

1989 novel by Martin Amis

- First edition
- Author: Martin Amis
- Language: English
- Genre: Black comedy
- Publisher: Jonathan Cape
- Publication date: 21 September 1989
- Publication place: United Kingdom
- Pages: 470 (first hardcover edition)
- ISBN: 0-224-02609-7

London Fields is a black comedy murder mystery novel by the British writer Martin Amis, published in 1989. The tone gradually shifts from high comedy, interspersed with deep personal introspections, to a dark sense of foreboding and eventually panic at the approach of the deadline, or "horrorday", the climactic scene alluded to on the very first page.

The story is narrated by Samson Young (Sam), an American writer living in London who has had writer's block for 20 years and is now terminally ill. The other main characters are Guy Clinch, the foil; Keith Talent, the cheat; and Nicola Six, the murder victim, who knows that she will be murdered a few minutes after midnight on 5 November 1999—her 35th birthday—and who goes in search of her killer.

== Plot summary ==
London Fields is set in London in 1999 against a backdrop of environmental, social, and moral degradation, and the looming threat of world instability and nuclear war (referred to as "The Crisis"). The novel opens with Samson explaining how grateful he is to have found this story, already formed, already happening, waiting to be written down.

This is the story of a murder. It hasn't happened yet. But it will. (It had better.) I know the murderer, I know the murderee. I know the time, I know the place. I know the motive (her motive) and I know the means. I know who will be the foil, the fool, the poor foal, also utterly destroyed. I couldn't stop them, I don't think, even if I wanted to. The girl will die. It's what she always wanted. You can't stop people, once they start. You can't stop people, once they start creating.

What a gift. This page is briefly stained by my tears of gratitude. Novelists don't usually have it so good, do they, when something real happens (something unified, dramatic, and pretty saleable), and they just write it down?

The characters have few, if any, redeeming features. Sam, the narrator of the novel (who twice emphasizes that he is "a reliable narrator"), is an American, a failed non-fiction writer with decades-long writer's block who is slowly dying of some sort of terminal disease. Recently arrived in London, he immediately meets Keith Talent, a cheat (small-time criminal) and aspiring professional darts player, at Heathrow Airport where Keith is posing as a minicab driver. Keith gives Sam an extortionately priced ride into town. The two converse in Keith's car, and Keith invites Sam to the Black Cross, a pub on the Portobello Road, Keith's main hangout. At the Black Cross, Sam meets Guy Clinch, a rich upper-class banker who is bored with life, with his terrifyingly snobbish American wife, Hope, and his out-of-control toddler, Marmaduke. Shortly after, the two both meet the anti-heroine, Nicola Six, a 34-year-old local resident, of uncertain nationality, who has entered the pub after attending a funeral.

Later that day, Sam sees Nicola dramatically dumping what turns out to be her diaries in a litter bin outside the flat where he is staying (it belongs to Mark Asprey, a wildly successful English writer). The diaries tell Sam that Nicola believes she can somehow see her own future, and, bored with life and fearing the ageing process, is plotting her own murder for midnight on 5 November, her 35th birthday. Sam, who considers that he lacks the imagination and courage to write fiction, realises he can simply document the progress towards the murder to create a plausible, lucrative, story. He assumes that Keith, the bad guy, will be the murderer. Sam enters into a strange relationship with Nicola where he regularly interviews her and is updated on the "plot".

The novel proceeds on the basis that Keith Talent, the known criminal, will kill Nicola Six, with Guy Clinch as the fall guy necessary to provoke him into doing it (and, incidentally, to provide funds to help Talent avoid being beaten up by loan sharks, and to further his darts career so he can appear in the Sparrow Masters darts final the day before the planned murder). But there is an unexpected twist at the finale. Amis hints at a false ending, in one of Samson Young's terrifying dreams, simply to confuse the reader.

== Characters ==
Keith regularly cheats on and abuses his wife, Kath. He regularly sleeps with an underage girl in return for cash payments to her mother and has up to six further regular affairs he visits frequently. He drinks, gambles, and takes part in burglaries and semi-violent crime (although he is unable to follow through with actual violent crime). He is addicted to pornography and television to the extent that he is unable to distinguish reality from what is shown on the screen. He has raped several women in the past (including his wife).

Nicola is a self-styled "murderee", who manipulates the entire cast of characters to bring about her own murder so that she will not have to face ageing, a natural process that she hates as she fears the loss of her attractiveness and power to manipulate men, as well as the indignities of decay and old age. She describes herself as a failed suicide, who must find her murderer if she is to end her life. She spins a different story to each of the three male characters (Sam, Keith, and Guy). To Guy, she pretends she is a frigid, sexually timid virgin: she tells him that her childhood in a dreadful orphanage and her friendship with a tragic girl called Enola Gay who is raped by a "pitiless Iraqi" and who produces a child called Little Boy, has left her unable to form a sexual relationship with any man, but that Guy has awakened the possibility in her. Feigning love for Guy, she teases him sexually at every opportunity, pretending she is too afraid and too unready to "go the whole way" with him, until his unsatisfiable and excruciating lust induces him to leave his wife and child and to give her a very large sum of money which he believes will help her bring the fictional Enola Gay and Little Boy to London. Nicola insists that Guy leave his wife and son to consummate their relationship, and Guy does so, destroying his family life. To Keith, Nicola styles herself as a rich, knowing woman of the world, a former one-night stand of the Shah of Iran, who recognises him for what he truly is – a darts prodigy and future darts and TV personality. She gives Keith Guy's money, which he spends on ridiculous clothes and accessories. Keith, a pornography aficionado (and addict) is kept keen by regular "home videos" created by Nicola, starring herself. To Sam, Nicola pretends to tell the whole truth, but in fact manipulates him as well, in a way that is apparent to the reader only when Sam himself realises – at the end of the story.

Guy is an idle, rich dreamer whose relationship with his "frightening wife" is sexless after the birth of their uncontrollable son, Marmaduke, who seems to have a violent Oedipal complex. Guy cheats on his wife and finally leaves her and his son to be with Nicola, although at the end, when he realises what Nicola is, he goes back home.

Sam is a failed writer who selfishly uses the three main characters to have a chance at writing a popular and successful novel. Although he knows that Keith is abusing his wife and someone is abusing their baby daughter, he does not intervene until the very end to remove the child from Keith's care.

== Unreliable narrators ==
One of the central themes of the novel is the link between reading and information-gathering, and the (un)reliability of written information, of narrators and narrative. Frederick Holmes writes that the novel dramatises a contest for authorship. All the main characters are authors of one kind or another, supplying Sam with written material, competing with each other to shape the narrative: Nicola's diaries, Guy's short stories, and Keith's own darting diary together with his cheat's brochure of goods and services. In the shadows of the novel is the mysterious Mark Asprey, whose pen-name, or one of them, is also Marius Appleby, initials MA (the same as Martin Amis). As Mark Asprey, he writes what appear to be highly popular fiction, translated into innumerable languages. As Marius Appleby, he writes what appears to be a true-life memoir of his seduction of a large-bosomed lady on an exotic foreign exploration. But (as we learn at every turn) the written word deceives us: Asprey prints his own translations to look impressive and Appleby's memoir is exaggerated to the point of being untrue. At the end of the novel, it appears that Asprey has appropriated Sam's narrative for his own. Asprey is not famous for writing: he is famous for being famous – for publicity. One of the protagonists in Appleby's "memoir" complains of the inaccuracies in the text in a magazine article – another gossip column, a piece of popular media, whose own accuracy we cannot trust.

Mass media has corrupted the ability to read and led to disorientation, heavy reliance is placed on gossip and tabloids, neither of which can pass any test of accuracy. When Kath, Keith's wife, wants to read "the proper papers", she has to go to the library: her husband's tabloids don't make any mention of world affairs, it is impossible to tell what is happening from them. Keith's obsession with television, and with the fast-forwarded, freeze-frame version of television that he screens nightly, and with his tabloid newspaper The Daily Lark, is so great that he becomes confused with reality. When he stars in the darts "docu-drama" – itself implying a dangerous mixture, or confusion, of reality and TV-fiction, he is unable to cope with the concept and it is Nicola who must "translate him" for TV.

=== London Fields and literary geography ===
London Fields is a park in Hackney, east London, but the novel is set in west London, like most of Amis's work. The park in which the narrator, Sam, walks with various characters – Nicola Six, Guy Clinch and Keith Talent – is Hyde Park in central London. Sam reminisces that he played in "London Fields" as a boy, and wants to return there before his death. It is not clear whether the "London Fields" he refers to is the real-life East London park, or whether it has another meaning. The title suggests a paradox: a rural or pastoral place in a modern urban setting. Sam's narrative refers again to this inherent paradox, as he remarks that in London "there are no fields", only fields of attraction and repulsion, only force fields. The title indicates to the reader the ambiguities inherent in Amis's creation of an imagined London: there is a conflict between the descriptions of London locations in the novel and their location in reality. The topography of the imagined city cannot fit exactly onto the topography of the real city. Just as Sam realises that "this is London and there are no fields", and just as he is unable to return to the "London Fields" of his childhood, it is similarly impossible for us to return to the stage of London as a field. London Fields exists simultaneously as a real place in the real London, and as an imagined and dreamed-of place "present all along" on every page of the novel, and the scene of a murder. A theme in London Fields is pub culture, specifically the culture of Keith's "local" The Black Cross. The book also references The Marquis of Edenderry, a pub in the west London suburb of Acton. One of Keith Talent's darts matches takes place in the Marquis of Edenderry. Keith Talent also drinks at a late-night drinking club called The Golgotha.

== Reception ==
Simon Schama commented in 2011:

"Martin Amis'[s] glorious fury, London Fields; the never-likely-to-be-bettered bedtime story from the heart of Mrs Thatcher's darkest Albion; stained with punk spit and pub puke; glossy as polished leather and sexy as hell. Amis' masterpiece isn't exactly neglected but neither is it established as one of the all-time great London novels, but that's what it is. Thick with allegory; packed with characters you'll never forget; a rendezvous with desire, craziness and death; what more could you want?"

Bette Pesetsky of The New York Times identified the recurring problem of female characterisation in Amis's novels as a salient one in London Fields. She wrote that the character of Nicola Six was "not truly satisfying as character or caricature. She seems to be another of Mr. Amis's plastic women." The review concluded that the book "succeeds, however, as a picaresque novel rich in its effects".

== Controversy ==
The Italian-Australian singer and writer Antonella Gambotto-Burke was revealed to be Amis' unconsenting muse for the character of Nicola Six, among others, including Zoya from House of Meetings.

In an essay for UnHerd, Gambotto-Burke wrote: "Over the decades, in fact, Martin would mine my childhood, my traumas, and my relationships for his fiction. As he explained in one of the letters, all he could write about was his life and, whether I liked it or not, I was part of his life. My anger sits in contrast to my memories of laughing beside Martin on the sofa as darkness fell, a bookcase at one end of the room and curtainless windows at the other. He remembered it all too. As he wrote in London Fields: 'She would know what you could get away with in the curtainless room, what adulteries, what fantastic betrayals.'

Gambotto-Burke wrote that Amis "returned, time and again, to that room and to those afternoons in his fiction: the fundamentally inaccessible woman, often in black; the long, deliriously detailed descriptions of (actual) kisses and paradoxically truncated accounts of (imagined) sex; love as an internalised, rather than shared, experience, secretive, unrelated to marriage, predominantly experienced in recollection, and always, always ending in sadness."

The letters Amis wrote to Gambotto-Burke over the five years of their secret romance now belong to the Harry Ransom Center at the University of Texas at Austin.

== Film adaptation ==
David Cronenberg was approached in 2001 to do a film adaptation of the book, and Amis wrote a draft of the script. However, Cronenberg would leave the film for A History of Violence and Eastern Promises. Other directors approached include David Mackenzie and Michael Winterbottom. The film entered production in September 2013 in London, England. Billy Bob Thornton plays the narrator Samson. The cast also includes Amber Heard, Jim Sturgess, Cara Delevingne, Johnny Depp, Jason Isaacs, and Theo James. Mathew Cullen directed the film. It had a wide release in US theaters on 26 October 2018 and was considered a massive critical and commercial failure. Amber Heard received a nomination for a 2019 Razzie Award for Worst Actress for the performance.

The score was written and produced by Toydrum and Benson Taylor.
