= Yellow Dog (novel) =

2003 novel by Martin Amis

- First edition
- Author: Martin Amis
- Language: English
- Published: 2003 (Jonathan Cape)
- Publication place: United Kingdom
- Media type: Print (hardback & paperback)
- Pages: 340 (first edition, hardback)
- ISBN: 0224050613

Yellow Dog is a 2003 novel by British writer Martin Amis. Like many of Amis's novels, the book is set in contemporary London. The novel contains several strands that appear to be linked, although a complete resolution of the plot is not immediately apparent. An early working title for the novel, according to an interview Amis gave with The Observer Review in September 2002, was Men in Power. Despite receiving generally negative reviews, Yellow Dog was longlisted for the Man Booker Prize in 2003.

== Plot summary ==
The main protagonist is Xan Meo, a well-known actor and writer, who is the son of Mick Meo, a violent London gangster who had died in prison years previously. Xan is severely beaten, apparently for mentioning the name of Joseph Andrews, one of his father's gangland rivals, in a book. Brain damage from the beating affects Xan's personality, and he becomes increasingly estranged from his wife, Russia (an academic who studies the families of tyrants), and two young daughters. Andrews is also conspiring with Cora Susan, who wants to take revenge on Xan because Mick Meo had crippled her father (who was sexually abusing Cora).

Using the pseudonym of Karla White, a porn actress, Cora contacts Xan (her uncle) and tries to seduce him, with the intention of wrecking his marriage, but fails. Xan confronts Andrews, who is also living in California, and learns that Andrews is his biological father. Xan confesses this to Cora, who reveals her own identity and confesses that Xan's refusal to have sex with her, coupled with the fact that he is not really Mick Meo's son, has undermined her plans for revenge against the Meo family.

Henry IX is the reigning monarch in this book. His 15-year-old daughter, Victoria, is about to become involved in a scandal when a videotape of her in the nude is released to the press. It transpires that Joseph Andrews has conspired with Henry's mistress, He Zhizhen, to obtain the tape and blackmail the authorities into allowing him to return to Britain without being arrested. Andrews returns, still intending to use his henchman, Simon Finger, to intimidate Xan by assaulting Russia Meo. The king and princess decide to abdicate, effectively abolishing the monarchy.

Clint Smoker, a senior reporter with a downmarket tabloid newspaper, is writing a series of articles of Ainsley Car, a maverick footballer with a history of assaults upon women. Despite his macho image, Clint is sexually dysfunctional, and responds hopefully to a series of flirtatious text messages from someone named "k8". Upon discovering that "k8" is a transsexual, Clint, who has talked with 'Karla White' in California, becomes enraged and drives to confront Andrews (whom Clint appears to blame for his ill-fated meeting with "k8"). Clint kills both Simon Finger and Andrews, but is blinded in his struggle with the latter.

Throughout the novel, reference is made to the arrival of a comet, which is to pass dangerously close to Earth. An airliner experiences a number of problems on its journey to New York from London, and is obliged to make an emergency landing at the moment the comet arrives.

== Reception ==
The tone of criticism overall was described by The Independent as "near universal derision".

Tibor Fischer made one of the most quoted statements in a book review of modern times saying in The Daily Telegraph "Yellow Dog isn't bad as in not very good or slightly disappointing. It's not-knowing-where-to-look bad. I was reading my copy on the Tube and I was terrified someone would look over my shoulder (not only because of the embargo, but because someone might think I was enjoying what was on the page). It's like your favourite uncle being caught in a school playground, masturbating." The Spectator said "excellent flourishes rise like buried treasure from the mud [but] far too much of Yellow Dog is filled with weak reruns of old material, implausible and unengagingly laborious working-out, and promising narratives which come to embarrassingly weak conclusions – the last 40 pages are a sequence of feeble punchlines, almost as if the author is by now as bored by his own material as is the reader. The Independent said "unimaginative and un-entertaining [...] Over-written, overcrowded and underpowered, Yellow Dog is a joyless, boring long-haul flight to nowhere [...] you'll find more humour – and sophistication – in a single issue of The Beano."

The Guardian's reviewer, Alan Hollinghurst, found "Yellow Dog a disturbing book, but its opening pages create a mood of excited reassurance: Martin Amis at his best, in all his shifting registers, his drolleries and ferocities, his unsparing comic drive, his aesthetic dawdlings and beguilements, his wry, confident relish of his own astonishing effects [...] Everything Amis writes is highly structured, but Yellow Dog gives signs of quite bristling organisation, in its three parts and its subdivided and subheaded chapters. They create a vague sense of anxious coercion, of asserted significance, of the author insisting on his terms and inventions."

The Times said "Yellow Dog marks a further plummeting in his literary trajectory [...] Interweaving all [the plot strands] into a compelling or indeed coherent novel proves beyond Amis's capabilities [...] Wonkily put together, his book is also copiously second-hand. Most of the material in it has been used by Amis before."

The New York Times gave a more favourable assessment: "aside from the novel's jagged formlessness and Amis's wearisome fondness for comic euphemism, the writing is still agile and exact, the hyperbole driven and punishing and the characters – when he lets them be – charismatically repulsive. The problem is Amis's intellectualism, which sticks out like a parson at an orgy and shrinks and shrivels whatever it goes near."
