= Visiting Mrs Nabokov =

First edition

Visiting Mrs Nabokov is a 1993 collection of non-fiction writing by the British author Martin Amis.

== Essays ==
The pieces include book reviews and interviews Amis conducted with other authors, and occasional journalism that Amis wrote while working for The Observer, The Guardian, and other publications during his early career as a writer. Among the authors that Amis profiles are Anthony Burgess, Graham Greene, J. G. Ballard and John Updike.

== Title essay ==
The title essay details a day spent with Véra Nabokov, the wife of one of Amis's literary heroes, Vladimir Nabokov.

== Reception ==
In The New York Times Book Review, novelist and critic Francine Prose wrote, "The essays in Visiting Mrs Nabokov are bright; they move quickly; they don't ask much of us, or offend. And isn't that just what we're looking for?"
