= Lemmons =

Listed building in Monken Hadley, Greater London, England

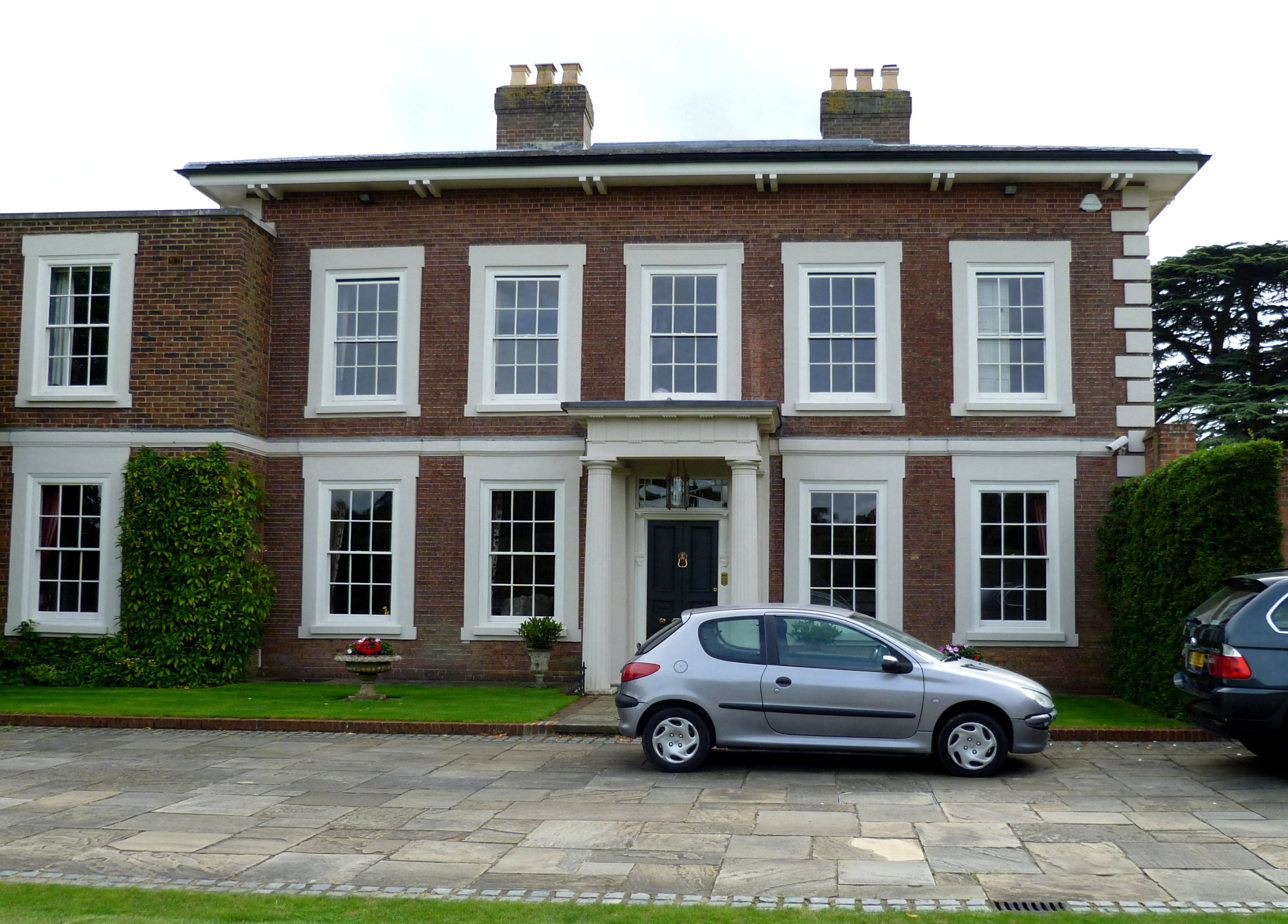
- July 2015
- Interactive map of the Lemmons area
- Alternative names: Gladsmuir, Gladsmuir House

General information
- Status: Grade II listed building
- Type: Residential house
- Architectural style: Georgian
- Location: Hadley Common, Monken Hadley, London Borough of Barnet, EN5, England
- Coordinates: 51.6603°N 0.1922°W
- Construction started: c. 1830

Technical details
- Floor count: Two storeys
- Grounds: Over eight acres

Other information
- Number of rooms: Over 20
- Parking: Gravel drive

Lemmons, also known as Gladsmuir and Gladsmuir House, was the home of the English novelists Kingsley Amis (1922–1995) and Elizabeth Jane Howard (1923–2014) on the south side of Hadley Common, Barnet, on the border of north London and Hertfordshire, England.

The couple bought the Georgian villa, built around 1830, (Note: Cherry and Pevsner (Yale University Press, 1998): "Gladsmuir House, a five-bay villa of c. 1830 with Victorianized front. Red brick with stucco trim, Doric porch with fluted columns. C18 timber-framed weatherboarded barn in the grounds; queenpost trusses; weathervane dated 1775.") for £48,000 at auction in 1968, along with its eight acres of land, and lived there until 1976. The house had been registered as a Grade II listed building in 1949 under the name Gladsmuir, previously known as Gladsmuir House. Howard restored an earlier name, Lemmons; the next owners changed it back to Gladsmuir.

Howard and Amis lived at Lemmons with Howard's mother and brother, two artist friends, and Amis's three children, including the novelist Martin Amis. Several of the family's novels were written at Lemmons: Kingsley's The Green Man (1969) and The Alteration (1976); Howard's Odd Girl Out (1972) and Mr. Wrong (1975); and Martin's The Rachel Papers (1973) and Dead Babies (1975).

The poet Cecil Day-Lewis stayed at Lemmons in the spring of 1972, when he was dying of cancer, accompanied by his wife, Jill Balcon, and their children, Daniel Day-Lewis and Tamasin Day-Lewis. He wrote his last poem in the house, "At Lemmons", and died there shortly afterwards. Ian Sansom writes that, for the brief period that the Amises, Howards, Day-Lewises and others were in residence, Lemmons became "the most brilliantly creative household in Britain".

== History of the house ==
=== 16th–19th century ===
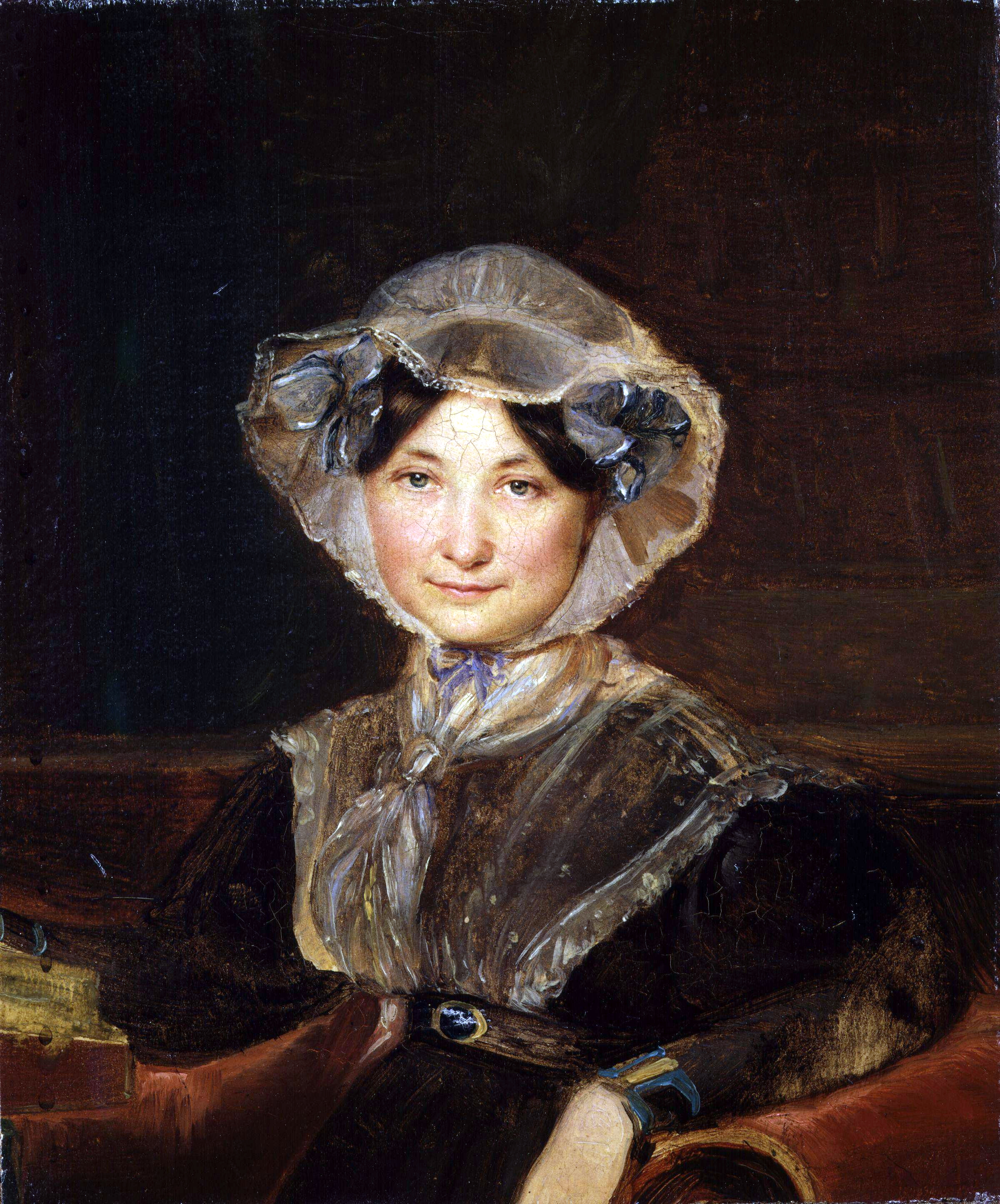
Frances Trollope (1779–1863) may have lived in the house from 1836 to 1838.

The land and an earlier house were owned by Henry Bellamy in 1584. The Quilter family owned the land from 1736 to 1909; it consisted of 23 acres in 1778. (Note: T. F. T. Baker, et al. (1976): "South of the common, Lemmons, formerly Gladsmuir House, stands on the site of a house belonging to Henry Bellamy in 1584; the building, with a Doric porch, an extension to the east, and a room enriched with late 18th-century medallions, has been much altered since it was built by the Quilter family, which owned the property from 1736 to 1909. It was owned by the author Kingsley Amis in 1972, when the poet laureate Cecil Day-Lewis died there." Footnote 90: "The house had an estate of 23 a. in 1778.") The present house was built around 1830. A Major Charles Hemery appears to have lived in the house in or around 1881.

The writer Frances Trollope, mother of the novelist Anthony Trollope, rented a house on Hadley Common from January 1836 until the early summer of 1838, possibly Gladsmuir, shortly after the death of her husband and one of her sons. According to Robert Bradford's biography of Martin Amis, Jane Howard discovered the Trollope connection from the house's papers and maintained that Frances Trollope had purchased it, although a purchase seems unlikely given the Trollope family's finances. Frances Trollope and four of her children moved to Hadley Common from Belgium, where they had fled to escape debtors' prison in England. When Trollope's husband (the debtor) died, the threat of prison receded. Her daughter Emily had tuberculosis, and her doctor advised that winter in England would benefit her.

Trollope described the property as "her pretty cottage" and a "pleasant house with a good garden on the common at Hadley, near Barnet". R. H. Super writes that Trollope invited eight guests to stay with her one Christmas, in addition to her family, so referring to it as a cottage was somewhat misleading. The move did not, in the end, help Emily, who died in February 1836. She was buried in the nearby churchyard at the Church of St Mary the Virgin. Anthony Trollope later placed one of his characters in The Bertrams (1859) in a dull country house in Hadley.

=== 20th century ===
Jane Howard found that the house had previously been called Lemmons, and decided to restore that name. It was known as Gladsmuir when they bought it—from Gladsmuir Heath, the former name of Hadley Common, site of the Battle of Barnet in 1471 during the Wars of the Roses. The house had been registered under that name as a Grade II listed building in 1949, previously known as Gladsmuir House, with an address in Hadley Wood Road. As of 2014 the address was listed as Hadley Common.

Made of red brick with a stucco trim, the house has five bays, two storeys, sash windows, and a central Doric porch with fluted columns and entablature with triglyphs. There is a later extension and a detached housekeeper's cottage, Gladsmuir Cottage. (Note: English Heritage (2015): "Circa 1830 Villa. Red brick with plot band, quoins and architraves of stucco. Low pitch slate roof with deep eaves on brackets. Two storeys, 5 windows, sashes with glazing bars. Central Doric porch with fluted columns and triglyph entablature. Panelled double doors. Good entrance hall, other interiors not seen." British Listed Buildings Online: "Circa 1830 Villa. Red brick with plot band, quoins and architraves of stucco. Low pitch slate roof with deep eaves on brackets. Two storeys, 5 windows, sashes with glazing bars. Central Doric porch with fluted columns and triglyph entablature. Panelled double doors. Good entrance hall, other interiors not seen.") The panelled double doors lead to two internal staircases and over 20 rooms, including eight bedrooms, three reception rooms and a large kitchen. One room contains late-18th-century medallions.

In the three-acre garden, when Jane and Kingsley lived there, there was an old barn that was itself a listed building, a conservatory, a gravel drive, three descending lawns, a rose garden, cedar trees, a mulberry tree (where Lucy Snowe, their cat, was buried), and a weathervane dating to 1775. At the end of the garden, through a five-bar gate, there lay a five-acre meadow that also belonged to the property and had been let out to two local women for their horses.

== Lemmons household ==
=== Residents ===
Amis and Howard married in 1965 after meeting two years earlier at the Cheltenham Literary Festival, which she had helped to organize. She had been married twice: in 1947 she had left her first husband, Peter Scott, with whom she had a daughter, and in 1963 she divorced her second, Jim Douglas-Henry. Kingsley was still married to his first wife, Hilly Bardwell, when he and Jane began an affair. The couple first lived together in an Edwardian house at 108 Maida Vale, London, W2. They bought Lemmons at auction for £48,000 in 1968, and lived there from 28 November that year. Kingsley wrote to the poet Philip Larkin in April 1969: "This is a bloody great mansion, in the depths of the country though only 15 miles from the centre, and with lots of room for you to come and spend the night."

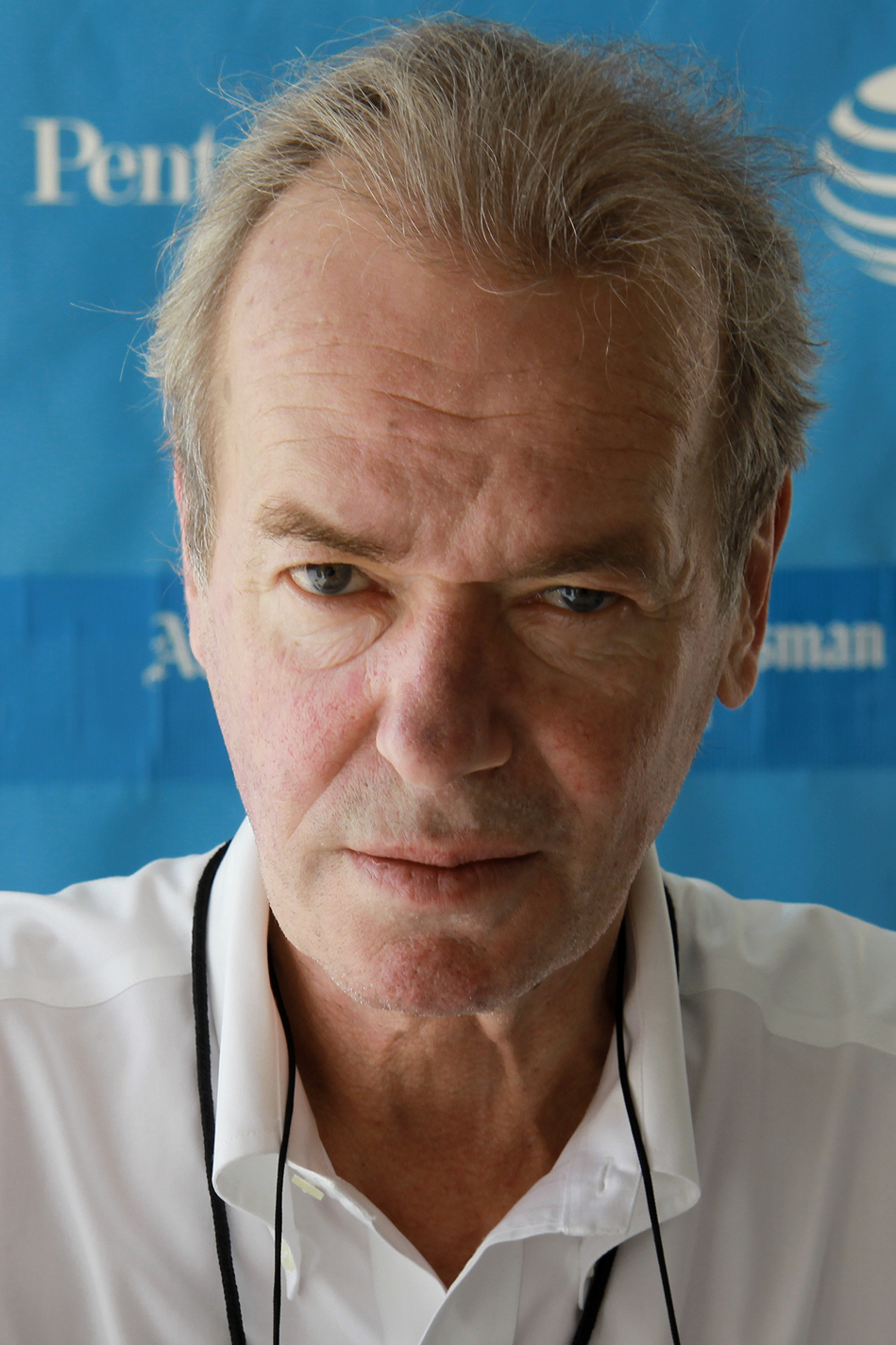
Martin Amis wrote his first two novels at Lemmons.

The core household consisted of Jane and Kingsley; Jane's mother, Katherine ("Kit"), a former ballerina, who died in the house in 1972; one of Jane's brothers, Colin Howard ("Monkey"); and artists Sargy Mann and Terry Raybauld. The housekeeper, Lilly Uniacke, lived in Gladsmuir Cottage. Kingsley's children, Philip, Martin and Sally Amis, lived in the house from time to time, mostly outside term time, or at weekends in the case of Philip and Martin; the children were 17, 16 and 12 when Kingsley and Jane married.

It was Jane who encouraged Martin to start reading, beginning with Jane Austen, and who "salvaged" his education, for which he said he owed her an "unknowable debt". After 12 months at Sussex Tutors (a Brighton crammer) in 1967–1968, he passed six O-levels and 3 A-levels, and won an exhibition to Exeter College, Oxford, graduating in 1971 with a congratulatory first in English. Martin lived at Lemmons until Christmas 1971, after which he started work at The Times Literary Supplement and moved to central London, visiting his father and Jane at weekends. He shared a maisonette in or near Pont Street, SW1, with a friend, Rob Henderson, who was the basis of Charles Highway in The Rachel Papers (1973), Gregory Riding in Success (1978), and Kenrik in The Pregnant Widow (2011). When they ran out of money, Martin found himself a "dust-furred bed-sit in Earls Court". He described Lemmons in Experience (2000):

The house on Hadley Common was a citadel of riotous solvency—not just at Christmas but every weekend. There was a great sense of in-depth back-up, a cellar, a barrel of malt whisky, a walk-in larder: proof against snowstorm or shutdown. I think it was that Christmas morning [1977], that all four Amises, with breakfast trays on their laps, watched Journey to the Centre of the Earth—then the visit to the pub, then the day-long, the week-long lunch. And with Kingsley the hub of all humour and high spirits, like an engine of comedy ... I felt so secure in that house—and, clearly, so insecure elsewhere—that I always experienced a caress of apprehension as I climbed into the car on Sunday night, any Sunday night, and headed back to the motorway and Monday, to the flat or the flatlet, the street, the job, the tramp dread, the outside world.

=== Novels ===
Kingsley wrote ten books at Lemmons, in his wood-panelled study on the ground floor, including The Green Man (1969), What Became of Jane Austen? And Other Questions (1970), Girl, 20 (1971), The Riverside Villas Murder (1973), Ending Up (1974), The Alteration (1976), and part of Harold's Years (1977). Jane finished Something in Disguise (1969), Odd Girl Out (1972), and Mr. Wrong (1975), although she spent most of her time looking after the house.

Martin wrote his first two novels, The Rachel Papers (1973) and Dead Babies (1975), in his bedroom above Kingsley's study. The first draft of The Rachel Papers was started in July 1970 and finished in September 1972; it won the Somerset Maugham Award in 1974, which Kingsley had won in 1955 for Lucky Jim (1954).

=== Guests ===
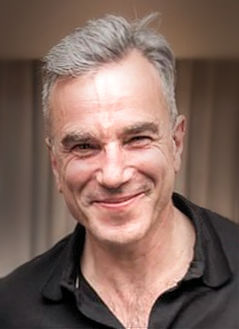
Daniel Day-Lewis in 2013

Alexandra "Gully" Wells, step-daughter of the philosopher A. J. Ayer and Martin's girlfriend for about 10 years from 1969, said of Lemmons that "a more hospitable household would be impossible to imagine". Tamasin Day-Lewis wrote:

Lemmons was full of impossibly glamorous older people and a core commune of writers, painters and inventors; even the dogs and cats shared a communal basket, and there were always stray writers and publishers whose marriages were unravelling. The drink flowed as freely as an open artery at family dinners.

House guests included Martin's close friends Christopher Hitchens, James Fenton, Clive James and Julian Barnes, and his and Kingsley's literary agents, Tom Maschler and Pat Kavanagh. The visitors' book also listed John Betjeman and Philip Larkin; Tina Brown and Paul Johnson; Iris Murdoch and her husband, John Bayley; Bernard Levin; John Gross, editor of the Times Literary Supplement; the novelist Jacqueline Wheldon and her husband, Huw Wheldon, the broadcaster; the historians Robert Conquest and Paul Fussell; and, for one visit, the novelist Elizabeth Bowen.

The Day-Lewises moved into Lemmons in the spring of 1972 when Tamasin's father, the poet laureate Cecil Day-Lewis, was dying of cancer. The families were close: Cecil and Jane had been lovers after her first divorce, and Jane was Tamasin's godmother. Tamasin and Martin had also started dating. Tamasin and her brother, Daniel, and their mother, Jill Balcon, stayed at the house for five weeks, until Cecil died on 22 May. Jane wrote: "Nobody was better at getting the utmost pleasure from the simplest things as Cecil: a bunch of flowers, a toasted bun, a gramophone record ... a piece of cherry cake, a new thriller ..." He dedicated his final poem, "At Lemmons", to "Jane, Kingsley, Colin, Sargy": "I accept my weakness with my friends' / Good natures sweetening each day my sick room."

== Move to Hampstead ==
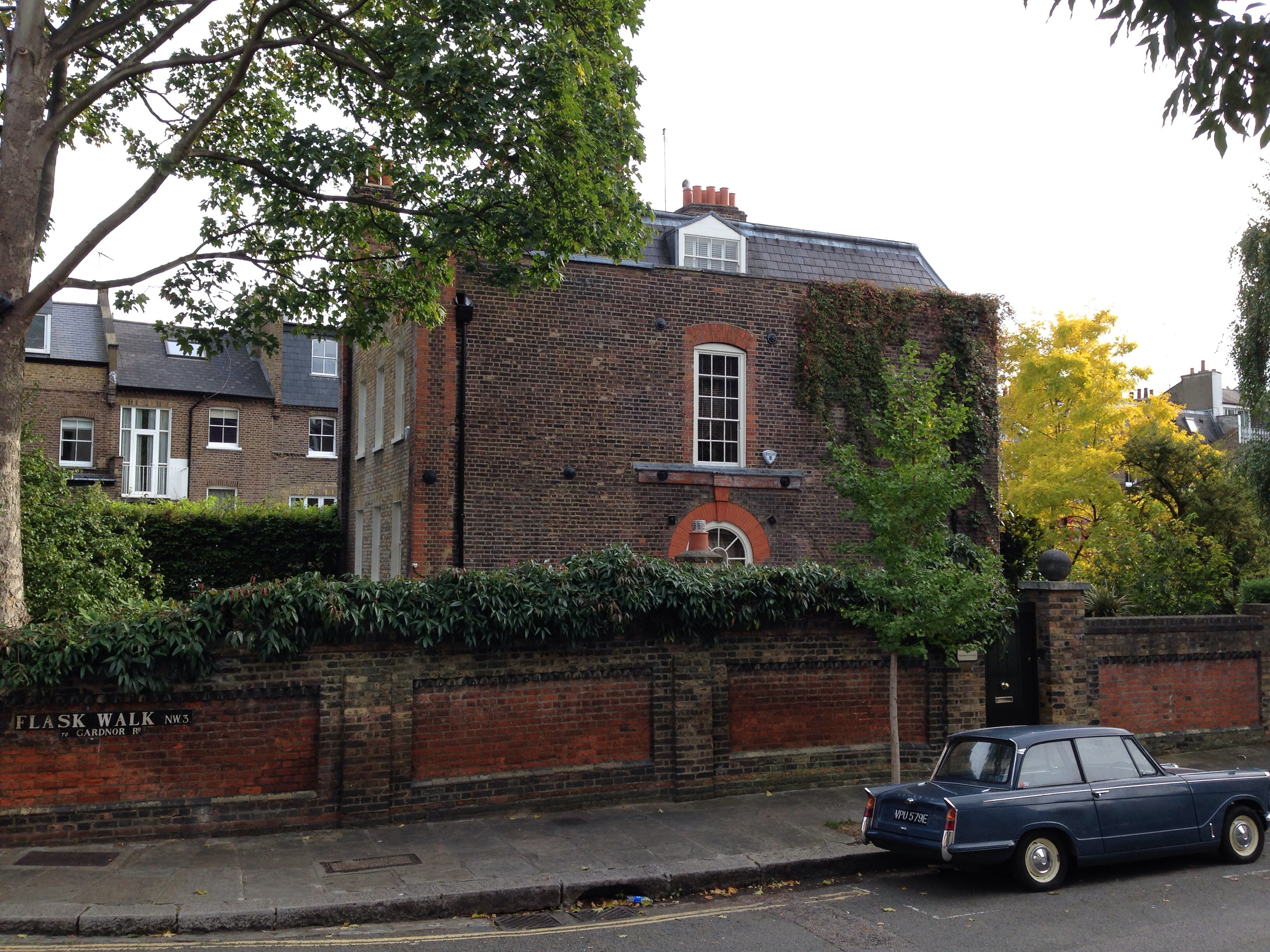
Gardnor House, Hampstead

Lemmons was featured in Woman's Journal in June 1976 in an advertisement for wallpaper by Arthur Sanderson & Sons. The company decorated a room and took a photograph of Kingsley and Jane sitting in it, published under the headline "Very Kingsley Amis, Very Sanderson".

The couple sold Lemmons shortly after this for £105,000, and moved to a smaller house, Gardnor House, in Flask Walk, Hampstead, London NW3. Kingsley was apparently tired of living so far from central London. Jane loved Lemmons but was exhausted from the effort of running it. Kingsley expected her to do most of the cooking and domestic work, for the family plus assorted guests, as well as drive him around and sort out the finances and much of the gardening. Women for Kingsley were "for bed and board", as Jane put it. She ended up on Tryptizol and Valium. Sargy Mann said that Lemmons was "wonderful for everyone but Jane".

Jane left the marriage in 1980 because she realised that Kingsley did not like her; her lawyer gave him a letter the day she was expected back from a health farm. Neither of them remarried, and they never spoke to one other again. "[T]he big house disappeared," Martin wrote, "and so did love."
