= Dead Babies =

Dead Babies or dead baby may refer to:

== Literature, film, and music ==
- Dead Babies (novel), a 1975 novel by Martin Amis
  - Dead Babies (film), a 2000 film based on the novel
- "Dead Babies", a song by Alice Cooper from the 1971 album Killer
- "Dead Babies", a song by Deep Wound from the 1983 EP Deep Wound

== Other ==
- Infant mortality
- Dead baby jokes
