= Martian poetry =

Movement in British poetry

Martian poetry was a minor movement in British poetry in the late 1970s and early 1980s, in which everyday things and human behaviour are described in a strange way, as if by a visiting Martian who does not understand them. Poets most closely associated with it are Craig Raine and Christopher Reid.

The term Martianism has also been applied more widely to include fiction as well as to poetry. The word martianism is, coincidentally, an anagram of the name of one of its principal exponents, Martin Amis, who promoted the work of both Raine and Reid in the Times Literary Supplement and the New Statesman.

Perhaps the best-known Martian poetry is Craig Raine's "A Martian Sends a Postcard Home" in which a Martian attempts to describe everyday human interactions and habits from his own point of view.

== Origins ==
The term derives from Raine's poem "A Martian Sends a Postcard Home" in which the narrator, a Martian, uncomprehendingly observes human behaviour and tries to describe it to fellow Martians. For example, the narrator calls books "Caxtons" and describes them as "mechanical birds with many wings" that "perch on the hand" and "cause the eyes to melt/or the body to shriek without pain."

This drive to make the familiar strange was carried into fiction by Martin Amis. His 1981 novel Other People: A Mystery Story where the story unfolds from the point of view of a protagonist who is apparently suffering from an extreme form of amnesia which causes her to lose her memory of even basic aspects of human experience.

Martian poetry became a popular element in the teaching of poetry composition to school children.

Related to Surrealism, it arose in the context of the experimental poetry of the late 1960s; but also owes a debt to a variety of English traditions including metaphysical poetry, Anglo-Saxon riddles, and nonsense poetry (e.g.: Lewis Carroll, Edward Lear). Samuel Johnson's descriptions of the metaphysical poets' approach where 'the most heterogeneous ideas are yoked by violence together' could aptly describe much Martian poetry; in this context what was distinctive about Martian Poetry was its focus on visual experience.
