= Bill Botten =

UK artist, originally a graphic designer (born 1935)

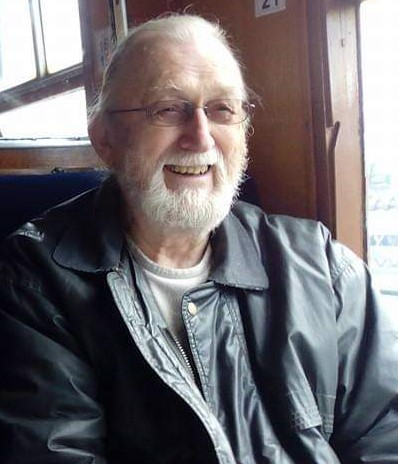
- Born: 19 May 1935 (age 90); London, England
- Occupations: Artist, illustrator, graphic designer

William Botten (born 19 May 1935) is a British illustrator, designer and artist known for the design of over 250 book covers.

== Early life ==
Botten was born in London, England, and was evacuated to the Buckinghamshire countryside for the duration of the Second World War. He left school aged 16 for his first job as a studio boy at advertising agency George Street & Company in the City of London. He returned to Streets after National Service in the Royal Air Force in Iraq.

== Career ==
After working as a designer at magazine publishers Fleetway Publications, London, he became Art Director at Sphere Books, a new paperback book publishers set up by Thomson Corporation in 1965. After a brief partnership with fellow designer Wilson Buchanan, he freelanced full time producing magazine adverts, exhibition stand designs and in the 1980s illustrations for the Avon Products cosmetics company. His most distinctive artistic legacy lies in the book jackets he designed for UK publishers, David Bruce and Watson, Hutchinson and Jonathan Cape. Many of these books are collectable and some command high prices.

=== Jonathan Cape ===
Botten produced 120 hardback book covers from the mid 60s to the mid-1980s commissioned by Tony Coldwell at Jonathan Cape. Cape had a reputation for publishing first editions of important authors. Botten designed and illustrated the cover for Salman Rushdie’s breakthrough novel Midnight’s Children. He took the photograph for Kingsley Amis’s novel Girl, 20 in his suburban home’s garage which he transformed into a photographic studio with a neighbour as model. The writer Ian McEwan’s first collection of short stories First Love, Last Rites is described as having “Beardsleyesque elegance”. Cape commissioned six covers for titles by science fiction author J G Ballard between 1973 and 1982. The covers of first editions of Ballard’s Crash and Hello America show Botten’s skill in airbrush technique. They also show his attention to how the book’s spine appears on the shelf with his jacket art often extending on to the back cover. The author Brian Aldiss liked Botten’s cover for the first edition of New Arrivals, Old Encounters. He always read the book before designing the cover.

=== James Bond ===
Jonathan Cape published Ian Fleming’s James Bond novels and subsequently Bond books written by other authors. Bill was asked to follow the style of Richard Chopping, designer of the original Fleming novels such as From Russia with Love (1957) and The Man with the Golden Gun (1965). Botten produced artwork for two novels by John Gardner: For Special Services (1982) and Icebreaker (1983) in Chopping’s style. When Christopher Wood’s novelisation of the screenplay for James Bond, The Spy Who Love Me (1977) was published by Jonathan Cape, Botten broke free of that earlier genre and produced a large oil painting which referenced the Pre-Raphaelite style. The subsequent novel of the film James Bond and Moonraker (1979) was in a different style again, using artists gouache.

=== Bill Botten - Artist ===
The commercial work earned him a living. His own work covers figures, abstracts and often surreal humour.
