= The Anti-Death League =

1966 novel by Kingsley Amis

- First edition
- Author: Kingsley Amis
- Cover artist: Raymond Hawkey
- Language: English
- Genre: Novel
- Set in: England
- Publisher: Victor Gollancz
- Publication date: 1966
- Preceded by: The Egyptologists
- Followed by: Colonel Sun

The Anti-Death League is a 1966 novel by English author Kingsley Amis. Set in England, it follows the lives of characters working in and around a fictional British Army camp where a secret weapon is being tested.

== Characters ==
The cast of characters is large. The principal ones include:

At the camp: Colonel "Chalky" White, commanding officer, professional soldier, a companionable man, wounded in North Africa during World War II; Major William "Willie" Ayscue, military chaplain with a pragmatic approach to Christianity, an amateur musician; Major Venables (whose given name no-one knows), chief instructor in the camp, of the Army Information Corps (a fictional unit), about 50 years old, admittedly a civilian in uniform; Captain Maximilian "Max" Hunter, Carabinier Guards (a fictional regiment), administration officer, intermittently an alcoholic; Captain Brian Leonard, security officer, a 40-year-old civilian counter-intelligence agent recently, for the purposes of Operation Apollo, commissioned into the 17th Dragoons ("The Sailors"), a fictional regiment with long and glorious history and traditions; Captain Moti Naidu, Indian Army officer on secondment, with a philosophical nature firmly grounded in Hinduism; Captain Alastair Ross-Donaldson, adjutant to the Colonel, who combines a tendency to technical intellectualism with military efficiency; Lieutenant James Churchill, Blue Howards (a fictional regiment). (Note: When the novel was published, the Green Howards were a real regiment. The Blue Howards never were.) Churchill is 24 years old; Private Deering, Brian's batman and principal informant in the camp; and Signalman Andy Pearce, a soldier who plays the flute.

Outside the camp: Dr Best, a psychiatrist who believes that psychiatric problems are the result of repressed homosexual or lesbian tendencies and who can without difficulty diagnose insanity in anyone; Lady Lucy Hazell, aged around 35, a widow with a remarkable sexual appetite who keeps open house for the army officers, among other men; and Catharine "Cathy" Casement, separated from her husband (who does not appear in the novel) early 30s, a sufferer from clinical depression, living in Lucy's house. (Note: When the novel was published, divorce in the United Kingdom was only possible for the limited reasons specified in the Matrimonial Causes Act 1937.) Later: Jagger, a middle-aged civil servant, who arrives unannounced in the camp by civilian helicopter. (The necessary paperwork arrives later.)

== Plot ==
=== The Edge of a Node ===
Cathy and Max are patients in the hospital. James, Moti and Willie visit Max. As they return to camp, they come across a motorcycle dispatch rider in the Royal Corps of Signals who has been fatally injured in a traffic accident. This is the first of several deaths in the novel, most accidental or incidental. Cathy and Max are soon discharged from hospital, "on probation". Max returns to duty. Cathy gains employment as a barmaid; she and James meet and fall in love (a major plot line which continues to the end of the novel).

Brian is convinced that there is a spy in or near the camp. He meets Best while he and other officers are visiting Lady Lucy's for various purposes (mostly, for sexual intercourse with Lucy) and arranges to be shown round the hospital. In Lucy's library, Willie discovers the manuscript of a trio-sonata for flute, violin and piano by the fictional late 18th century composer Thomas Roughead (this forms a minor sub-plot). Best attempts to rape Lucy but James rescues her.

=== The Founding of the League ===
Willie receives an anonymous poem which shocks him. It is an attack on God, which to him as a clergyman means that the writer needs help in case he falls into the sin of despair. He wonders if it might have been written by Andy, who is grieving over the death by illness of a close friend; but later assures himself that it was not. Willie discovers Brian searching his room, in his capacity as security officer. Max fails to seduce Andy. (Note: When the novel was published, homosexual activity (called in law, gross indecency) was a criminal offence in the United Kingdom under the Labouchere Amendment of 1885.) Brian visits the hospital, where he drops heavy hints about the secret nature of the project at the camp. Alastair summons Brian back urgently, because public notices have been discovered in the camp advertising the formation of a branch of "The Anti-Death League". Such an abnormal happening may compromise the project. James discovers a lump in Cathy's breast.

Several officers attend the inaugural meeting of The Anti-Death League, as do a few ordinary soldiers. The organiser of the meeting does not identify himself and is not identified. Brian concludes that the anonymous organiser is not the spy he has been chasing. James (who has the highest security clearance for Operation Apollo) says to Max (who does not) that he visualises a lethal node, a military term for a place which it is death to enter, but one extending in time rather than in space. It began with the death of the dispatch rider, and will end only with the death of someone as little known to them as he was. James tells Max what Operation Apollo involves.

The weapon is tested in Exercise Nabob. Best is seen entering the restricted area. At about the same time, news is radioed through that Cathy has breast cancer. Brian orders that Best be kept under observation and not apprehended. Best evades the observers. While returning from the exercise, the engine of the lorry carrying the weaponry catches fire, and it has to be unloaded in a hurry, as Best sees. Attempts to capture him are unsuccessful.

=== Operation Apollo ===
Cathy and James are having a long bedroom conversation about the nature of human relationships, when their room is lit up by the flash of what might be a night time use of the weapon. It turns out that one of the weapons has been stolen, and fired, destroying a ruined priory. Venables points out several difficulties in attributing this to Best. Jagger now arrives at the camp, and sees similar difficulties to Venables.

One of Brian's agents discovers the stolen weapon in the hospital. Brian, Max and Jagger drive there. Brian and Max bluff their way in. Best attempts to have them sedated and committed to his hospital as mental patients ("sectioned"). There is a struggle; Jagger intervenes in the nick of time; and Best is taken into custody.

A spy is discovered in the camp. Shooting breaks out, during which Max displays initiative and Jagger kills the spy with his bare hands. There is one other casualty, an arriving civilian lecturer caught in the crossfire. (Note: The civilian was Dr L. S. Caton. He had appeared, always as a figure deserving of contempt, in earlier novels by Amis.)

Jagger has deduced who the anonymous poet, the perpetrator of the Anti-Death League and the thief are; but has several reasons not to pursue any of those matters further. Not least, because Operation Apollo has been a tremendous success. Brian is told that he has admirably performed the function for which he was selected, and of the operation's success. He had known that the weapon test was a cover for something still more secret; he is now told the deepest secret of all.

James has withdrawn into himself, not eating or communicating, and is being sheltered by Lucy and Willie, when Brian arrives. He fetches Cathy from hospital, where her breast has been operated on, and tells the two women the true nature of Operation Apollo (though not its deepest secret). Cathy tells James that her treatment should be successful, that she knows the horrific nature of Operation Apollo, that it will not be carried out, and that she loves him. James begins to recover. The novel concludes with a concert of Roughead's music and has a poignant final twist.

== Critical reception ==
Early critics gave the novel a mixed reception. Walter Allen, quoting other reviewers, writing in the New York Times, said, "It is getting enormously respectful, slightly puzzled attention" and "represents a new phase in Amis's development". Kirkus Reviews said, "By the close, one has been exposed to so many strenuous activities and ideas, that it's difficult to remember just what has gone on [...] Amis has some marvelous jargon throughout.... All in all, it might be classed as an intellectual thriller-- it's a work of considerable originality and agility and it should keep its readers firmly captive, midway between attention and admiration". Bernard Bergonzi, writing in The New York Review of Books, called it, "a generalized and implicitly symbolic fiction, in which Mr. Amis has voluntarily surrendered some of his major strengths as a novelist". According to Allan Casson, writing in The Massachusetts Review, "The Anti-Death League has the materials for two good novels. The one we have is, unfortunately, incoherent".

More recent critics have been more positive. Anthony Burgess included The Anti-Death League in his 1984 book Ninety-Nine Novels: The Best in English since 1939 — A Personal Choice. Amis died in 1995, and his obituaries mention the novel at least in passing. Zachary Leader, in his 2006 book The Life of Kingsley Amis, did no more than summarise his own idea of the subject-matter. In 2009, Andrew Brown, writing in The Guardian, said, "The Anti Death League is a prolonged and furious attack on God and the necessity of suffering (which also contains some of his sweetest writing about love)". In 2011, Philip Hensher wrote several articles which mention the book; calling it "fascinating, unforgettable, flawed" and "magnificent". In 2013, Andrew James, in his book Kingsley Amis: Antimodels and the Audience, analysed the novel in detail. In 2014, Spanish writer Ana Rojo López analysed the effects of Francoist censorship on the 1967 translation of the novel into Spanish. In 2012, the novel was reprinted as a Penguin Modern Classic.
