= Wintertime (film) =

1943 film by John Brahm

- Directed by: John Brahm
- Written by: E. Edwin Moran; Jack Jevne; Lynn Starling
- Based on: story by Arthur Kober
- Produced by: William Le Baron
- Starring: Sonja Henie; Jack Oakie; Cesar Romero
- Cinematography: Joseph MacDonald; Glen MacWilliams
- Edited by: Louis R. Loeffler
- Music by: Leo Robin; Nacio Herb Brown
- Distributed by: Twentieth Century-Fox
- Release date: September 17, 1943
- Running time: 82 min.
- Country: United States
- Language: English
- Box office: $1.1 million (US rentals)

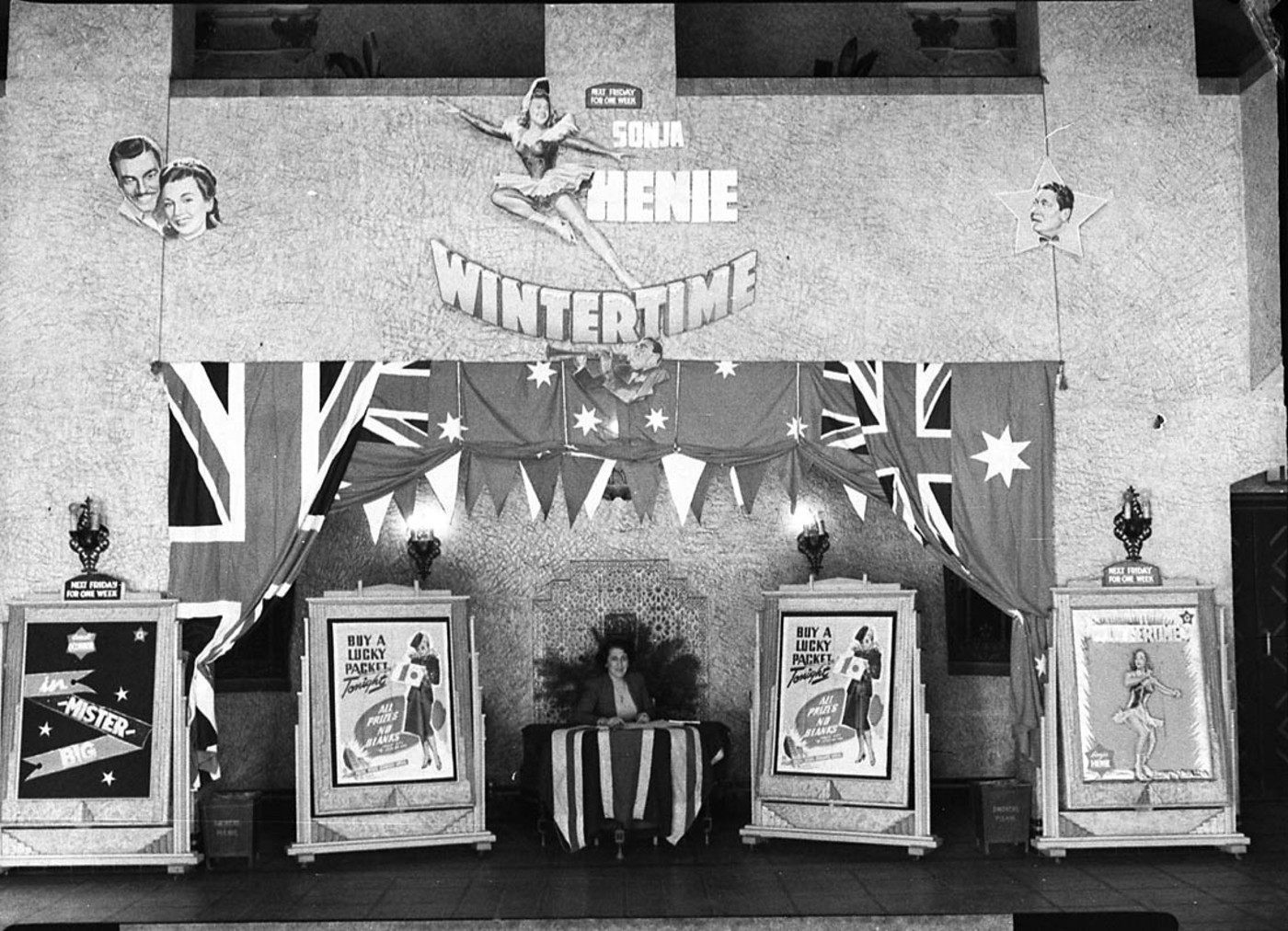
Advertising display for Wintertime at an Australian conference of theatre managers in 1944

Wintertime is a 1943 Twentieth Century-Fox musical film directed by John Brahm and starring Sonja Henie and Cesar Romero. It also features Woody Herman and His Orchestra.

== Plot ==
Norwegian millionaire Ostgaard (S.Z. Sakall) and his niece Nora (Sonja Henie) believe they will be staying at a posh resort in Canada, but it turns out owner Skip Hutton (Jack Oakie) and partner Freddy Austin (Cornel Wilde) are in debt and barely holding off foreclosure.

Nora schemes to get her uncle to invest in hotel improvements. She also falls for Freddy, although he's busy spending time with magazine photographer Marion Daly (Helene Reynolds), trying to gain publicity for the resort.

When more money is needed, Nora is offered a chance to skate in New York in a revue. But due to a legal technicality, she cannot enter the United States unless she is married to an American citizen, so handsome Brad Barton (Cesar Romero) gladly volunteers.

== Cast ==
- Sonja Henie as Nora Ostgaard
- Jack Oakie as Skip Hutton
- Cesar Romero as Brad Barton
- Carole Landis as Flossie
- S. Z. Sakall as Uncle Ostgaard
- Cornel Wilde as Freddy Austin
- Woody Herman and His Orchestra as Themselves
- Helene Reynolds as Marian
- Don Douglas as Jay Rogers
- Geary Steffen as Jimmy, Sonja's Skating Partner
- Buford (Buff) McCusker, Sonja's Skating Partner

== Production ==
In December 1941 Fox announced that Felix Jackson was writing Quota Girl as a vehicle for Sonja Henie which was meant to be made before Iceland. It was about a Norwegian girl who wants to emigrate to the US. The intention was to film it after Henie's appearance at Madison Square Garden in January. Filming was pushed back. In July Fox announced it would be made in October with H Humbertson directing, in color from a script by Francis Wallace. In August Arthur Kober was signed to write the script. In September Fox announced that filming would start in January.

In October Woody Herman and His Orchestra were signed to appear in the film, replacing Glenn Miller who had joined the Army.

In November Cornel Wilde was cast as Henie's leading man.

In January 1943, the film was retitled Wintertime. William Goetz, who was running 20th Century Fox in the absence of Darryl F. Zanuck, announced the film would be made as part of a 13-picture slate.

Cornel Wilde was cast in February 1943. The following month Carole Landis joined the cast. Filming started 8 March.

== Songs ==
- "I Like It Here" ... (performed by Cesar Romero and Carole Landis)
- "Jingle Bells" ... (performed by Woody Herman and His Orchestra)
- "Wintertime" ... (performed by Woody Herman and His Orchestra)
- "We Always Get Our Girl" ... (performed by Woody Herman and His Orchestra)
- "Dancing in the Dawn" ... (performed by Woody Herman and His Orchestra)
- "Later Tonight" ... (performed by Woody Herman and His Orchestra)

== Reception ==
The New York Times said the film "not only lacks originality. It lacks humor, verve and color as well." Filmink called it "good fun" with "great work" from Landis and Romero.
