= D. R. Shackleton Bailey =

British classical scholar (1917–2005)

D. R. Shackleton Bailey FBA
- Born: David Roy Shackleton Bailey; 10 December 1917; Lancaster, Lancashire, England
- Died: 28 November 2005 (aged 87); Ann Arbor, Michigan, U.S.
- Education: Gonville and Caius College, Cambridge
- Occupation: Classical scholar
- Spouses: Hilary Bardwell (m. 1967; div. 1975); Kristine Zvirbulis (m. 1994)

David Roy Shackleton Bailey FBA (10 December 1917 – 28 November 2005) was a British scholar of Latin literature (particularly in the field of textual criticism) who spent his academic life teaching at the University of Cambridge, the University of Michigan, and Harvard. He is best known for his work on Horace (editing his complete works for the Teubner series), and Cicero, especially his commentaries and translations of Cicero's letters.

== Background ==
Bailey was born in Lancaster, Lancashire, the youngest of four children born to John Henry Shackleton Bailey and Rosmund Maud (née Giles). After being educated at Lancaster Royal Grammar School, where his mathematician father was headmaster, Shackleton Bailey read first Classics and then Oriental Studies at Gonville and Caius College, Cambridge, before spending the years of the Second World War at Bletchley Park, the home of the British code-breaking efforts.

== Career ==
He returned to Caius as a fellow in 1944, and in 1948 obtained a lectureship in Tibetan at Cambridge University. In 1955 he migrated to Jesus College, Cambridge, where, as Director of Studies in Classics, he began publishing the long series of books and articles on Latin authors that would occupy the rest of his life. He spent four more years at Caius from 1964 to 1968, this time serving as Bursar and Senior Bursar. This time, his move was reputedly because Sir Denys Page, Master of Jesus, refused to allow Shack (as he was commonly known) to have a cat-flap installed in his ancient oak door. In 1968 he crossed the Atlantic, specifically to the University of Michigan at Ann Arbor; and in 1976 he moved to Harvard University (whose Classics department he had visited in 1963), first as Professor of Greek and Latin, then (from 1982) as Pope Professor of the Latin Language and Literature. He twice served as the editor of Harvard Studies in Classical Philology (1980-1981 and 1983–1985). In 1988 he retired from Harvard and became an adjunct professor at the University of Michigan, teaching until 2002.

In 1958 he earned the double honour of a fellowship of the British Academy (whose Kenyon Medal he would be awarded in 1985) and a Litt.D. degree from Cambridge; he also held an honorary Litt.D. from Dublin University, awarded in 1984. He was elected a Fellow of the American Academy of Arts and Sciences in 1975 and a member of the American Philosophical Society in 1977. He was a member of the American Philological Association, which awarded him the Goodwin Award of Merit in 1978; a member of the American Academy of Arts and Letters; an honorary member of the Society for the Promotion of Roman Studies; and an honorary fellow of Gonville and Caius College, Cambridge.

The bulk of his scholarly work focused on Latin philology and Roman history and prosopography. In retirement he prepared many editions for the Loeb Classical Library published by Harvard University Press, including those of Martial, Valerius Maximus, Statius, and the correspondence of Cicero.

== Personal life and death ==
In 1967 he married Hilary Ann Bardwell (who was later married to Alastair Boyd), the former wife of the British author Kingsley Amis; this marriage was dissolved in 1975. In 1994 he married Kristine Zvirbulis (1946-2009). He was extremely fond of cats (the first volume of his seven-volume Cambridge University Press edition of the Letters of Cicero is dedicated to Donum, a feline present from Frances Lloyd-Jones) and of classical music.

He died of Alzheimer's disease in Ann Arbor, Michigan, on 28 November 2005.

== Publications (selected) ==
- Shackleton Bailey, D. R., ed. (1951). The Śatapañcāśatka of Mātṛceṭa. Translated by I-Ching. Cambridge: University Press.
- Shackleton Bailey, D. R. (1958). Propertiana. Cambridge: University Press.
- Cicero, M. Tullius (1961). Shackleton Bailey, D. R. (ed.). Epistulae. Vol. II.2: Epistulae ad Atticum, libri IX–XVI. Oxford: Clarendon Press.
- ed. Cicero: Letters to Atticus 7 v. (Cambridge, 1965–70).
- ed. Cicero: Epistulae ad familiares 2 v. (Cambridge, 1977).
- trans. Cicero’s letters to his friends (Atlanta, 1978).
- Cicero’s Letters to Atticus 2 v. (Penguin, 1978).
- Profile of Horace (Harvard, 1982).
- ed. Anthologia Latina I fasc. 1: Libri Salmasiani aliorumque carmina (Stuttgart, 1982).
- ed. Q. Horati Flacci Opera (Stuttgart, 1985).
- ed. and trans. Cicero: Philippics (Chapel Hill, 1986).
- ed. M. Tulli Ciceronis Epistulae ad Atticum 2 v.(Stuttgart, 1987).
- ed. M. Tulli Ciceronis Epistulae ad Familiares (Stuttgart, 1988).
- ed. M. Tulli Ciceronis Epistulae ad Q. Fratrem, ad M. Brutum, Commentariolum petitionis, fragmenta epistularum (Stuttgart, 1988).
- ed. M. Fabii Quintiliani Declamationes minores (Stuttgart, 1989).
- Onomasticon to Cicero’s speeches (Stuttgart, 1988, 1991²).
- trans. Cicero. Back from Exile: Six Speeches upon his Return (Atlanta, 1991).
- ed. M. Annaei Lucani De bello civili libri X (Stuttgart, 1988; 1997²).
- ed. M. Valerii Martialis epigrammata (1990).
- Homoeoteleuton in Latin dactylic verse (Stuttgart, 1994).
- Onomasticon to Cicero’s letters (Stuttgart, 1995).
- Onomasticon to Cicero’s treatises (Stuttgart, 1996).
- Selected classical papers (Ann Arbor, 1997).
- ed. and trans. Valerius Maximus: Memorable doings and sayings 2 v. (Loeb Classical Library #s 492, 493, Harvard UP, 2000).
- ed. and trans. Cicero: Letters to friends 3 v. (Loeb Classical Library #s 205, 216, 230, Harvard UP, 2001).
- ed. and trans. Statius: Silvae (Loeb Classical Library #206, Harvard UP, 2003; corrected ed. 2015).
- ed. and trans. Statius: Thebaid Books 1-7 (Loeb Classical Library #207, Harvard UP, 2003).
- ed. and trans. Statius: Thebaid Books 8-12; Achilleid (Loeb Classical Library #498, Harvard UP, 2003).
- ed. and trans. Quintilian: The Lesser Declamations 2 v. (Loeb Classical Library #s 500, 501, Harvard UP, 2006).
