= Henry Fairlie =

British political journalist and social critic

- Born: 13 January 1924; London, England
- Died: 25 February 1990 (aged 66); Washington, D.C., US
- Education: Corpus Christi College, Oxford
- Occupation: Journalist

Henry Jones Fairlie (13 January 1924, in London, England – 25 February 1990, in Washington, D.C.) was a British political journalist and social critic, known for popularizing the term "the Establishment", an analysis of how "all the right people" came to run Britain largely through social connections. He spent 36 years as a prominent freelance writer on both sides of the Atlantic, appearing in The Spectator, The New Republic, The Washington Post, The New Yorker, and many other papers and magazines. He was also the author of five books, most notably The Kennedy Promise, an early revisionist critique of the US presidency of John F. Kennedy.

In 2009, Yale University Press published Bite the Hand That Feeds You: Essays and Provocations (ISBN 9780300123838), an anthology of his work edited by Newsweek correspondent Jeremy McCarter.

== Biography ==
Fairlie was born in London, the fifth of seven children in a family of Scottish descent. His father, James Fairlie, was a heavy-drinking editor on Fleet Street; his mother, Marguerita Vernon, was the daughter of a Presbyterian minister. Fairlie attended Byron House and Highgate School before studying Modern History at Corpus Christi, Oxford.

After taking his degree in 1945, Fairlie began his journalism career at the Manchester Evening News, followed by a brief stint working for David Astor at The Observer. During this time he married Lisette Todd Phillips, with whom he had a son and two daughters. He had an affair with Kingsley Amis's wife, Hilly, in 1956.

== Fleet Street ==
In 1950, Fairlie joined the staff of The Times, rising at an early age to become the chief writer of its leaders on domestic politics. In 1954, he gave up the security of that post to assume the greater independence of a freelance writer, which he remained until the end of his life. As the author of the "Political Commentary" column in The Spectator, first under the nom de plume "Trimmer", then under his own byline, he helped define the modern political column.

In September 1955, Fairlie devoted a column to how the friends and acquaintances of Guy Burgess and Donald Duart Maclean, two members of the Foreign Office widely believed to have defected to Moscow, tried to deflect press scrutiny from the men's families. He defined that network of prominent, well-connected people as "the Establishment", explaining:

By the 'Establishment' I do not mean only the centres of official power—though they are certainly part of it—but rather the whole matrix of official and social relations within which power is exercised. The exercise of power in Britain (more specifically, in England) cannot be understood unless it is recognised that it is exercised socially.

The term was quickly picked up in newspapers and magazines all over London, making Fairlie famous.

As Fairlie became better known, his personal life grew chaotic. He drank heavily and conducted a series of extramarital affairs, including one with the wife of his friend Kingsley Amis that nearly ended their marriage. Never responsible with money, he amassed thousands of pounds of debts. Also, in 1965, he insulted Lady Antonia Fraser on television, which led to a libel suit against him and the Independent Television Authority. That year, he visited America for the first time and fell immediately in love with the country. A few months later, he moved there for good.

== America ==
Fairlie was an anomaly in Washington, a Tory whose unique brand of conservatism frequently left him more sympathetic to the Democrats than the Republicans. These heterodox politics helped him find a perch at The New Republic, where he was a regular contributor from the mid-1970s until his death in 1990. In the mid-1980s, when he was unable to keep up payments on his apartment, he was even reduced to living in his office there, sleeping on a couch next to his desk.

Fairlie devoted much of the second half of his career to trying to explain America to Americans. Between 1976 and 1982, he wrote "Fairlie at Large", a bi-weekly column for The Washington Post. In those pieces he often abandoned political subjects to write about American manners and morals: for instance, why Americans would do well to give up showers in favour of more contemplative baths. His romantic attachment to the possibilities of American life found its fullest expression in a long essay titled "Why I Love America", which The New Republic published on 4 July 1983.

In the winter of 1990, Fairlie fell in the lobby of The New Republic, breaking a hip. After a brief hospitalisation, he died on 25 February. His ashes were buried in the family plot in Scotland.

== Books ==
- The Life of Politics, Methuen, 1968.
- The Kennedy Promise: The Politics of Expectation, Doubleday, 1973.
- The Spoiled Child of the Western World: The Miscarriage of the American Idea in Our Time, Doubleday, 1976.
- The Parties: Republicans and Democrats in This Century, St. Martin's, 1978.
- The Seven Deadly Sins Today, New Republic Books, 1978.
- Bite the Hand That Feeds You: Essays and Provocations, edited by Jeremy McCarter, Yale University Press, 2009.
