= I Like It Here =

1958 novel by Kingsley Amis

- Author: Kingsley Amis
- Language: English
- Publisher: Victor Gollancz
- Publication date: 1958

I Like It Here is a novel by the English writer Kingsley Amis, first published in 1958 by Victor Gollancz.

The 'here' of the title is England, and the novel is about going away from here, to abroad.

Amis called it merely 'experience with style sauce' - and the novel uses material from his own life, his trip to Portugal to fulfill the conditions of his Somerset Maugham Award - he would not write such an explicitly autobiographical novel again until later works such as You Can't Do Both (1994), The Folks That Live on the Hill (1990) and, partially, The Biographer's Moustache (1995).

== Criticism ==
The Times Literary Supplement has called it a 'slight but bookishly funny early novel', in which Amis's alter ego Garnet Bowen is 'ludicrously sent off to Portugal in search of a reclusive writer named Wulfstan Strether', and admired the more serious and eloquent tone achieved when, finding himself in Lisbon, Bowen contemplates Henry Fielding’s tomb:

“Bowen thought about Fielding. Perhaps it was worth dying in your forties if two hundred years later you were the only non-contemporary novelist who could be read with unaffected and whole-hearted interest, the only one who never had to be apologized for or excused on grounds of changing taste. And how enviable to live in the world of his novels, where duty was plain, evil arose out of malevolence and a starving wayfarer could be invited indoors without fear. Did that make it a simplified world? Perhaps, but that hardly mattered beside the existence of a moral seriousness that could be made apparent without evangelical puffing and huffing.”

== Notes ==
The model for 'Oates' in the novel was J.G.('Billy') Barley, an 'English business type' - he worked as a translator in the offices of a Portuguese family named Pinto Basto, friends of John Aeron-Thomas. a Swansea industrialist. Barley grew up in Portugal and had Portuguese nationality, but his father was English. Amis called him, in a letter to Philip Larkin (10 July 1955) - 'very amiable in a childish way, which is a heap better than some mature ways' - 'he doesn't quite know which country he belongs to - he is a motor-bike maniac, endlessly discussing the engine of his German motor-scooter ("This is one of the only twelve that were ever put on the market in Portugal").'

The models for Harry and Isabelle Bannion - were the Tyrrells, (friends of the Browns, the Browns worked at the University College of Swansea) -- 'the wife is a Goanese lady, a devout RC, he, a Belfast Prod by origin'.
