= The Russian Girl =

1992 novel by Kingsley Amis

- Cover of first edition (hardcover)
- Author: Kingsley Amis
- Language: English
- Genre: Comedy novel
- Publisher: Hutchinson
- Publication date: 1992
- Publication place: United Kingdom
- Media type: Print (hardback & paperback)
- ISBN: 0091745365

The Russian Girl is a 1992 comedy novel by Kingsley Amis published by Hutchinson & Co.

== Plot ==
Set in the early 1990s, the novel describes in comic detail events set in train by the arrival in London of Russian poet Anna Danilova. Richard Vaisey, Anna's sponsor and soon-to-be lover is a middle-aged academic, a professor of Slavonic studies not so happily married to wife Cordelia. Anna's youth and charm is what attracts Richard, not her poetry which he regards as doggerel. Anna attempts to portray her would-be oligarch brother, in legal trouble in Russia, as a dissident in order to elicit support from the London literati. Comedy ensues in Cordelia's response to Richard's infatuation and in the interaction of the latter with other minor characters.

== Reception ==
The novel was in general favourably reviewed. The New York Times described it as "more of a good wine, vintage Amis: smooth, dry and not overpriced". The Los Angeles Times called it "a wonderful new concert of plot and language that provokes both belly laughs and twinges of discomfort". Kirkus Reviews described it as "Vintage Amis – as divisive, compelling, and hilarious as the Bobbitt trial". Publishers Weekly, however, found it "only fitfully amusing".
