= Hilary Kilmarnock =

First wife of Sir Kingsley Amis (1928–2010)

- Born: Hilary Ann Bardwell; 21 July 1928; Kingston-upon-Thames, London, England
- Died: 24 June 2010 (aged 81)
- Other names: Hilary Bardwell; Hilary Amis; Lady Kilmarnock; Hilly
- Education: Bedales
- Spouses: Kingsley Amis (m. 1948; div. 1965); D. R. Shackleton Bailey (m. 1967; div. 1975); Alastair Boyd, 7th Baron Kilmarnock (m. 1977; died 2009)
- Children: 4, including Martin Amis, Sally Amis
- Family: Lucy Partington (niece); Isabel Fonseca (daughter-in-law)

Hilary Kilmarnock, Lady Kilmarnock (21 July 1928 – 24 June 2010), known as Hilly, was the first wife of Kingsley Amis and the mother of Martin Amis. When her third husband, Alistair Boyd, became Chief of Clan Boyd and 7th Baron Kilmarnock, she became Lady Kilmarnock.

== Early life and education ==
Hilary Ann Bardwell was the youngest child of Leonard Sidney Bardwell, a Ministry of Agriculture civil servant, and Margery M. Bradley-Clark. She had three older brothers and a sister. She grew up in Kingston-upon-Thames, moving to Harwell, Oxfordshire when her father retired after WWII. She attended Bedales School and Beltane School for one year. To avoid wartime bombing she was sent to Dr Williams’ School for Young Ladies in North Wales but was expelled after running away. She returned to Bedales, from which she also ran away several times, leaving school permanently when she was 15. She was described in one school report as “unteachable”. Her sister suspected she may have been dyslexic.

After leaving school she worked as a trainee kennel maid, a stable hand and assisted at wartime day nurseries. She enrolled as an art student at Ruskin College, Oxford, but “abandoned the course”, working as a ‘head model’ (one who modelled from the neck up) at the college instead.

== Relationship with Kingsley Amis ==
Hilly and Amis met at Elliston and Cavell’s tearoom in Oxford in 1946, with Amis passing her a note to her ask if she would like to go for a drink. She replied positively a few days later. One early connection of theirs was a shared a love of jazz.

When Hilly became pregnant at the end of the year, the couple tried an unsuccessful ‘DIY abortion’. After seeking an (illegal) surgical procedure, and upon the advice of several doctors about the risk to Hilly's health, they chose to keep the baby. They married at the Oxford registry office on 21 January 1948 and moved into a small flat in north Oxford the following month. In the May they moved to Eynsham, with Hilly giving birth to Philip (named after Kingsley's best friend, Philip Larkin) on 15 August 1948. Their second son, Martin was born in 1949, after which the family moved in briefly with Hilly's parents.

In 1950 the family moved to Swansea so that Amis could teach at the university. Money was tight and Hilly took work cleaning the local cinema. In January 1951 she received a legacy of £2,400, which meant they could buy a house in the Uplands area of Swansea. After the publication of Amis's first novel Lucky Jim in 1954, the family's fortunes improved significantly. In the same year, Hilly gave birth to their third child, a daughter, Sally, at home. As a parent, Hilly “set no rules and had a refreshing disregard for health and safety.”

Hilly discovered that her husband had been serially unfaithful to her when she found a private diary and letters. These detailed a number of affairs, many of which involved women known to Hilly. Amis’ infidelities had begun before the birth of Martin, their second son. Hilly was also occasionally unfaithful, beginning when they were living in Swansea. In 1956 she “announced she was in love with the married journalist Henry Fairlie” but “Kingsley saw him off with a blistering letter.”

In autumn 1958 the family moved to Princeton, New Jersey, for a year, where Amis had been invited to take up the position of Visiting Fellow in Creative Writing at the university. Amis's infidelities continued there. In 1961 the family moved to Cambridge, England, where Amis took the position of fellow in English at Peterhouse. The role did not last long and in Easter 1962 the couple travelled to Majorca and found a house near local resident Robert Graves, whose writing Amis “much admired”.

It was around this time that Amis met the author Jane Howard at the Cheltenham Literary Festival, who would become his second wife. When Hilly found out about their relationship, unlike previous infidelities, “there were to be no promises of better behaviour” from Amis. Soon after this meeting, while on holiday in Yugoslavia and “overwhelmed with misery at the latest evidence of his infidelity”, she wrote “1 FAT ENGLISHMAN [the title of his current book]. I FUCK ANYTHING” on Amis's back in lipstick while he was asleep on the beach.

Soon after, Amis left for a holiday with Howard, with a plan to return to the family in time to relocate to Majorca for the start of the school year. However, when he got back to Cambridge, Hilly had already left for Sóller in Majorca, taking the children with her. In response, Amis headed to Howard's flat. From this moment, “Hilly and Amis were never to live together as husband and wife.”

Hilly lived with her three children in Sóller until they returned to England in 1964, moving briefly into Ovington Gardens, then Fulham Road in London. By this point Hilly was “profoundly depressed... drinking heavily”, taking amphetamines and barbiturates. Around this time she destroyed all the letters Amis had ever sent her.

Hilly took in paying boarders and began work at Battersea Park zoo, “which she liked very much, animals being her chief enthusiasm and joy through life.” Hilly and Amis's divorce was finalised in June 1965. The following month Hilly and the children moved to Wivenhoe, Essex.

== Marriage to Bailey ==
It was in Wivenhoe that she began a relationship with David Roy Shackleton Bailey, known as “Shack”, a fellow and bursar at Gonville and Caius College, Cambridge. They married on 21 November 1967. The following year Bailey obtained a position as professor of Latin at the University of Michigan. They moved with Sally to Ann Arbor where Hilly opened a fish and chip shop called “Lucky Jim’s”. Bailey was “parsimonious to her" and she ran the shop to generate spending money. The relationship was ultimately unsuccessful, and Hilly began a brief affair with Milton Cohen, another academic, who retired soon after the affair began, moving to Crete without Hilly.

In summer 1970 Cohen booked Hilly, Bailey and Sally a holiday apartment in Andalusia but wanted Hilly to join him in Crete. However, she wanted to stay in Spain for the entire season, while Bailey wanted to return to America. At this point Hilly made it clear “she was not going back with him, then or ever.”

== Marriage to Boyd ==
Sally found a language school in Ronda run by Alastair “Ali” Boyd, who was to become Hilly's third husband. She helped Boyd run the school for a few months and the pair tried, unsuccessfully, to launch in Seville. While in Seville, Hilly found a job as a matron at an international school for a year, after which she and Boyd returned to Ronda. On their return, the couple ran art courses, managed a bar and took in paying guests at Casa de Mondragon, the house where Boyd had lived with his previous wife for twenty years.

In 1972 Hilly returned to Swansea to give birth to their son, Jaime. The following year, Bailey finally granted her a divorce. Hilly and Boyd married in 1977 and they returned to England the same year. The family lived in Thornborough, Buckinghamshire and Boyd (his father having died in 1975) took his seat in the House of Lords. Money was tight; at one point “Hilly and a friend set up a hot-dog stand on the motorway to make a little extra.”

== Caring for Amis ==
In 1980 Howard left Amis, and his long-standing phobia of being alone became a problem. Initially his sons provided company, but a long-term solution was needed. Philip suggested Hilly, Boyd and Amis create an unlikely “ménage” – “Amis had money, Hilly had the necessary household skills and... Ali did his bit around the house too.”

Initially, Hilly and Boyd lived with Amis in his house on Jeffrey's Place, London. However, they soon found the house too small for “a child, a writer, a politician and a housewife” in residence. In 1982 they moved to Kentish Town and three years later in July 1985 they moved to an even larger house on Primrose Hill. The arrangement included Amis’ paying Hilly £50 a week to keep the house. In a letter from 1993, Amis wrote “Three houses and 13 years later... it certainly seems to work.” The arrangement lasted until Amis's death in 1995.

In Martin Amis's memoirs he “reminds his mother that she rescued Kingsley, bought him “back to life and love” and that Amis could never have written his last six novels, his memoirs and last poems, without her.” Zachary Leader, Kingsley’s biographer, wrote that after Howard left Amis, he “became clearer (or at least more public) about Hilly’s importance to him: leaving her, he claimed, was the single biggest mistake of his life.”

== After Amis’s death ==
In 1998 Hilly and Boyd moved permanently to Ronda. Boyd died in 2009. Hilly, suffering from emphysema and having trouble walking following an accident with one of her horses, died in 2010.

== In literature ==
Amis dedicated his 1984 novel Stanley and the Women to Hilly. He also dedicated the poem For H to her, which appeared “instead of an epilogue” in his memoirs. Zachary Leader identified that Amis’ characters Rhiannon Weaver (The Old Devils, 1986) and Jenny Standish (Difficulties with Girls, 1988) took inspiration from Hilly. He also cites the plots of That Uncertain Feeling (1955) and Take A Girl Like You (1960) as being influenced by Amis’ marriage to Hilly.

Gavin Ewart’s 1991 poem Relicts, as It Were, cites Hilly (née Bardwell) and Monica Jones (Philip Larkin's partner) as witnesses to the normal lives of poets. It begins:

All ordinary life goes on.
Hilary Bardwell, Monica Jones
have heard the poets bursting out
in very unbardic tones

— Gavin Ewart, Relicts, as It Were

== See also ==
- Jacobs, Eric Kingsley Amis: A Biography (1995) Pub. Hodder and Stoughton. Including a selection of photographs ISBN 978-0312186029
