= The Letters of Kingsley Amis =

2000 book by Kingsley Amis

- First edition
- Author: Kingsley Amis, edited by Zachary Leader
- Language: English
- Genre: Correspondence
- Publisher: HarperCollins
- Publication date: 2000
- Publication place: England
- Media type: Print (Hardback)
- Pages: 1,264
- ISBN: 0-00-257095-5
- OCLC: 43632181
- Dewey Decimal: 828/.91409 22
- LC Class: PR6001.M6 Z48 2000

The Letters of Kingsley Amis (2000) was assembled and edited by the American literary critic Zachary Leader. It is a collection of more than 800 letters from Amis to many different friends and professional acquaintances from 1941 until shortly before his death in 1995. About one quarter of the letters selected were addressed to Amis's close friend, the poet Philip Larkin.

The other recipients of letters included in the book include:

- Brian Aldiss, novelist
- Martin Amis, novelist and Amis's younger son
- Philip Amis, Amis's older son
- John Betjeman, poet
- Robert Conquest, historian and poet
- Brian Cox, literary critic
- Robert Graves, poet and novelist
- Elizabeth Jane Howard, novelist, Amis's second wife
- Anthony Powell, novelist
- C. P. Snow, novelist
- Anthony Boucher, novelist
- Paul Ferris

The publication of the book was concurrent with that of Experience, a memoir by Kingsley Amis's son, the novelist Martin Amis. The author David Lodge called the Letters "a major literary event" and the critic John Carey proclaimed Leader's editing of the letters to be "omniscient".
