= Alastair Boyd, 7th Baron Kilmarnock =

Scottish clan chief and nobleman

Member of the House of Lords Lord Temporal
- as a hereditary peer 15 May 1975 – 11 November 1999
- Succeeded by: Seat abolished (Note: Under the House of Lords Act 1999.)

Personal details
- Born: 11 May 1927
- Died: 19 March 2009 (aged 81)
- Party: SDP (1981–88) 'Continuing' SDP (1988–90); SDP (1990) (1990–92)
- Spouses: Diana Mary Gibson (m. 1954; div. 1970); Hilary Bardwell (m. 1977)
- Children: 1
- Education: Bradfield College; King's College, Cambridge
- Occupation: Scottish clan chief Writer

Alastair Ivor Gilbert Boyd, 7th Baron Kilmarnock (11 May 1927 – 19 March 2009) was a Scottish writer, Hispanophile, and Chief of the Clan Boyd.

== Early life ==
Boyd was born into an aristocratic British family, and served as a pageboy at the coronation of King George VI and Queen Elizabeth. He was educated at Bradfield College and King's College, Cambridge, and was commissioned into the Irish Guards in 1946. He served with them until 1948, including a spell in Palestine.

== Personal life ==
Boyd married Diana Mary Gibson in 1954 but the marriage was dissolved in 1970. Gibson died in 1975. He married for a second time, in 1977. His new wife, Hilary Bardwell ("Hilly"), had been married twice before: first to Kingsley Amis (with whom she had three children: Philip Amis, the novelist Martin Amis, and Sally Amis), and later to D. R. Shackleton Bailey. Boyd and Bardwell had one son, James Charles Edward Boyd, known as "Jaime," who was born in 1972. After the end of Kingsley Amis's second marriage, he came to live with Lord Kilmarnock and his ex-wife Hilly.

Boyd lived for much of his life at Ronda in Andalusia, first with Diana, and later with Hilly and their son James, where he variously ran a tapas bar and a language school.

As Boyd's only son was born before his parents' marriage, the title of Baron Kilmarnock was inherited by Boyd's younger brother, Robin Jordan Boyd (b. 1941), who succeeded to the peerage in 2009. Robin Boyd has two sons, Simon John Boyd, born 1978, and Mark Julian Boyd, born 1981. The heir apparent is the elder of his two sons, Simon John Boyd, who has a son, Lucian Michael Boyd (born 2007).

== Political career ==
After inheriting his father's title in 1975 Boyd took his seat in the House of Lords, eventually joining the Social Democratic Party (SDP), which according to his obituary in The Times "suited his political instincts admirably". He served as the party's chief whip in the Lords from 1983 to 1986. He was the deputy leader of the SDP Peers from 1986 to 1987, and served as the chairman of the All-Party Parliamentary Group on Aids from 1987 to 1996. A loyal follower of David Owen, in 1988 he joined him in rejecting the SDP's merger with the Liberals by helping to form the breakaway 'continuing' SDP instead. Reportedly "saddened" by the original party's demise, he remained associated with the Owenite rump party and its even smaller successor until 1992, thereafter sitting in the Lords as a crossbencher. Along with many other anti-merger Social Democrats, including Owen himself, Boyd was also instrumental in establishing the Social Market Foundation think tank, and was appointed its first executive director in 1989.

== Writing ==
His publications include Sabbatical Year (1958); The Road from Ronda (1969); The Companion Guide to Madrid and Central Spain (1974); The Essence of Catalonia (1988); The Sierras of the South (1992); The Social Market and the State (1999); and Rosemary: A Memoir (2005).

His essay, The Quest (2006), on the paintings of his friend Miles Richmond (1922–2008), appeared in catalogues that accompanied exhibitions by Richmond at the Convento de Santo Domingo, Ronda (2006) and the Galeria Italcable, Málaga (2008).

== Notes ==
Peerage of the United Kingdom
Preceded by Gilbert Boyd	Baron Kilmarnock; 1975–2009	Succeeded by Robin Boyd
