= Hello America =

1981 novel by J. G. Ballard

- Cover of first edition (hardcover) by Bill Botten
- Author: J. G. Ballard
- Language: English
- Genre: Science fiction
- Publisher: Jonathan Cape
- Publication date: June 4, 1981
- Publication place: United Kingdom
- Media type: Print (Hardcover & Paperback)
- Pages: 224
- ISBN: 0-224-01914-7
- OCLC: 9325708
- Dewey Decimal: 823/.914 19
- LC Class: PR6052.A46 H4 1981

Hello America is a science fiction novel by British writer J. G. Ballard, published in 1981. First edition cover designed by Bill Botten. The plot follows an expedition to a North America rendered uninhabitable by an ecological disaster following an energy crisis.

== Synopsis ==
Hello America is set in 2114 AD, after an ecological collapse has rendered North America virtually uninhabitable. Most of the population evacuated to Europe and Asia. The bulk of the novel takes place when a European steamship, the SS Apollo, sails to America to try to discover the cause of increased radioactive fallout in England.

Each of the crew members has a secret agenda, and is subject to their own psychological yearnings. Most of the Apollo's crew are descended from expatriate Americans who have become assimilated into European society, while still feeling some draw to their homeland.

In the novel, the Soviet Union dammed the Bering Strait in the 1990s, thus changing global weather patterns by reversing the normally clockwise currents in the Pacific Ocean. Although the Russians were able to grow grain as far north as the Arctic Circle, a massive drought began east of the Rocky Mountains. West of the Rockies, the opposite problem was true. Further, much of coastal Asia froze over. The expedition eventually encounters survivors from a previous expedition. One of these survivors calls himself "President Charles Manson," but none of the Apollo's crew understood the historical reference.

In the end, it was implied that Europe needs America, if only as a place where the darker elements of the Western mindset can emerge without inconveniencing decent people. A kind of rebirth re-establishes something akin to the old order, allowing insanity to appear in small doses to everyone, rather than bottled up in one person where it proves to be really dangerous. Possibly for the first time ever, nuclear weapons are used for a constructive purpose, and the 'New World Order' that arises from the events of the book contains both the promise of a better future and the understated promise/threat of phantasmagoric horrors to come, though presumably in smaller doses.

== Interpretation ==
Though the plot is a straightforward adventure, the book offers a subtle parody of American culture. For instance, the final President of the United States was the then-current governor Jerry Brown of California, who was a promising face in American politics at the time of the novel. His small, ironic role represents both the triumph and ultimate failure of West Coast liberalism of the late Cold War era: when faced with a massive ecological crisis that threatens (and indeed ultimately destroys) the nation, Brown's solution is to build a large youth center, a twice-life-size fiberglass replica of the Taj Mahal, and then abandons the country so he can devote himself to self-improvement. The novel states that Brown dies at age 114 in a Buddhist Monastery in a glaciated Japan.

== Media ==
=== Film adaptation ===
In May 2017, Netflix acquired film rights to the novel with Scott Free’s Ridley Scott, Kevin Walsh and Michael Pruss producing the film.

== Reception ==
Dave Pringle reviewed Hello America for Imagine magazine, and stated that "I feel Ballard could have got more of America into the book, but instead he has rested content with an entertaining two-finger exercise."

Dave Langford reviewed Hello America for White Dwarf #46, and stated that "As I suspected, this is the book for those who think they don't like Ballard: set in an America being rediscovered after its collapse, it's full of marvellous things, from New York choked with golden sand to Los Angeles in a rain forest. It satirizes Ballard's own surreal version of the American Dream - I mean, a platoon of 44 robot US Presidents charging into action! - and ends with absurd optimism. Excellent."

== Reviews ==
- Review by Joseph Nicholas (1981) in Vector 104
- Review by Michael Moorcock (1981) in Foundation, #23 October 1981
- Review [French] by Pascal J. Thomas (1982) in A&A, #77
- Review [French] by Stéphane Nicot? (1982) in Fiction, #326
- Review by Andrew Tidmarsh (1982) in Science Fiction Review, Spring 1982
- Review [German] by Michael K. Iwoleit (1984) in Science Fiction Times, Juni 1984
- Review by Dan Chow (1988) in Locus, #333 October 1988
- Review by David Pringle (1989) in Interzone, #28 March–April 1989

== Sources ==
- Rossi, Umberto (1994). "Images from the Disaster Area: An Apocalyptic Reading of Urban Landscapes in Ballard's The Drowned World and Hello America", Science-Fiction Studies #62, 21:1, March, 81–97.
- Pringle, David. News From The Sun #9, October 1983. Pringle notes that Hello America is effectively a tribute to Limbo (1952) by Bernard Wolfe, and that Ballard has acknowledged the parallels between the two books.
