= Jake's Thing =

1978 satirical novel written by Kingsley Amis

- First edition Cover art by Quentin Blake
- Author: Kingsley Amis
- Language: English
- Publisher: Hutchinson
- Publication date: 1978
- ISBN: 0-09-134390-9 (first edition)
- Dewey Decimal: 823.914
- LC Class: PZ4.A517 Jak

Jake's Thing is a satirical novel written by Kingsley Amis, first published in 1978 by Hutchinson. According to Craig Raine, it is a fictionalised account of Amis’s affair with the novelist Elizabeth Jane Howard.

== Plot summary ==
The novel follows the life of Jacques 'Jake' Richardson, a 59-year-old Oxford don who struggles to overcome the loss of his libido.

== Reception ==
In the magazine Prospect, critic Andrew Marr discussed his expectation that Amis' work would be retrospectively beyond the pale. "What slightly spoils this diatribe, however, is that to prepare for it I went back to Kingsley Amis’s novels and enjoyed myself more than was convenient for my purposes. Jake’s Thing, for instance, famously rancid with misogyny, turns out, on re-reading, to be surprisingly tender in parts, and intensely moving on the humiliations of impotence."

Writing in The Millions, critic Catherine Baab-Muguira acknowledged the novel's "comic brio."
