= Other People (novel) =

Novel by Martin Amis

- First edition (US)
- Author: Martin Amis
- Language: English
- Publisher: Jonathan Cape (UK); Viking Press (US)
- Publication date: 1981
- Publication place: United Kingdom
- Media type: Print (Hardback, Paperback)
- ISBN: 978-0-224-01766-4
- OCLC: 7395704
- Dewey Decimal: 823/.914 19
- LC Class: PR6051.M5 O8 1981b
- Preceded by: Success
- Followed by: Money

Other People: A Mystery Story is a novel by British writer Martin Amis, published in 1981.

== Plot ==
Mary, an amnesiac young woman, wakes in a hospital and cannot remember who she is, what has happened to her, or even simple things such as how to blow her nose or what clouds are. She leaves the hospital and takes the name "Mary Lamb" after overhearing a nursery rhyme. Mary befriends a woman named Sharon, an alcoholic who seems well-meaning to the naïve Mary until she prostitutes her for money. After enduring painful sex, Mary smashes the man's mouth in once he passes out. She flees, coming into contact with a policeman named Prince, who knows about Mary's past.

Mary lives for a while with Sharon's parents, also alcoholics, but eventually she moves into a shelter for "fallen women." She receives a letter from Prince that includes a newspaper clipping concerning her before she lost her memory. Mary learns that her real name is Amy Hide and that her past was quite dark, a fact which causes Mary a great deal of distress. During her stay at the shelter, she gets a job as a waitress in a seedy café. With one exception, all of the male employees sexually harass her, but she does not understand the significance of their actions. The exception is Alan, a meek and highly insecure man who is deeply infatuated with Mary but does nothing to ward off the attentions of others. Mary meets Prince again, and she learns that Amy had asked someone to kill her. According to Prince, the failed killing was what had caused her amnesia. The man who did it is behind bars but due to be released.

When Alan and another co-worker, the cocksure but illiterate Russ, find out where Mary lives, they are appalled and ask her to join them at their squat. Alan appears tortured by her presence and by the continued kisses and fondling she receives from other men, particularly Russ. To comfort him, Mary begins sleeping with Alan. This does not seem pleasant for either of them, and after a while Mary decides to break their relationship off. In response, Alan hangs himself.

Mary goes to see a man named Michael, whom she finds out she had dated before she lost her memory. Pretending to be Amy's cousin, she asks Michael about the things that Amy did to him. Amy, according to him, was abusive, vindictive, and unfaithful. She is escorted out of Michael's office by his assistant, Jamie, who takes pity on the shabby-looking Mary and invites her to live with him. Jamie is extremely wealthy, and he squanders his wealth largely on drugs and alcohol. Mary becomes infatuated with Jamie and is crushed when he does not return her affection. The two eventually begin a sexual relationship, but it is clear that Jamie does not return Mary's love.

After their relationship ends, Mary moves in with Prince and begins going by Amy. They slowly develop a relationship, one that is deeper than any other that Amy has experienced in the course of the novel. One night, Prince informs Amy that her would-be killer has been released, and that she must confront him. It is never directly revealed who the killer is, although it is implied to be Prince. The confrontation scene ends ambiguously—it is unclear if Mary is finally killed. The next scene recalls the opening lines of the novel, but it is not certain whether this is a recapitulation, an event that happened in Mary's past, or what occurred after the confrontation scene.

== Style ==
The book starts as a comedy, slips into a thriller, and ends a horror story.

Amis saw the novel as a kind of overall investigation. "Mary (the main character) doesn't know what her role is," Amis explained in 1981. "Because of this, men start questioning their own attitudes towards women, and even about themselves. When one's role is undermined, you begin to look at everything around you in a different light."

Though narrated in the third person, the book's descriptions seem to come from Mary's point of view; because the world around her is completely alien, the descriptions are often bizarre, childlike, and (particularly in the very beginning) somewhat difficult to understand. This can sometimes make for poignant tragic irony—it is often clear to the readers, but not to Mary, that other characters do not mean well. This is true, for example, of the scene where Sharon prostitutes Mary for money, or of the repeated scenes of sexual harassment that Mary endures at the café where she works.

== Reception ==
The book was well received in Britain and the United States. The writer J. G. Ballard called Other People "Powerful and electrifying... 'Other People' is a metaphysical thriller, Kafka reshot in the style of Psycho." Writing in The Guardian, poet, writer and critic Anthony Thwaite spoke the novel's "enormous confidence of address," continuing, "Other People is 'about' a descent into Hell, Hell being 'other people'-- it's a very strange and impressive performance." The Times found "For all its savagery... Other People is a funny book... an achievement light years ahead of his earlier novels." Judy Dempsey wrote in The Irish Times, "Amis has done something important in 'Other People.'" In the Los Angeles Times, Charles Champlin called Amis "an English literary celebrity who, like Norman Mailer and Truman Capote here, finds himself in the columns more often than some film stars," and found the book, "an ingenious and mischievous piece of writing, nothing like a mystery with a tidy ending...a tour de force."

== Composition ==
Other People is the first book Amis completed after choosing to become a full-time fiction-writer; he had been on-staff at the New Statesman until 1979. Amis told an interviewer "I wanted to leave to devote myself to full-time writing. It was the responsibility of doing something else, not wholly connected with my writing that exhausted me from writing what I wanted. I enjoyed it, but I felt writing was more important."
