= Success (novel) =

1978 novel by Martin Amis

- First UK edition
- Author: Martin Amis
- Language: English
- Publisher: Knopf (US); Jonathan Cape (UK)
- Publication date: 1978
- Publication place: England
- Preceded by: Dead Babies
- Followed by: Other People

Success is Martin Amis's third novel, published in 1978 by Jonathan Cape.

== Plot ==
Success tells the story of two foster brothers—Terence Service and Gregory Riding, narrating alternate sections—and their exchange of position during one calendar year as each slips towards, and away from, success.

== Themes ==
Success is Amis's first statement of the doppelganger theme that would also preoccupy the novels Money, London Fields, and, especially, 1995's The Information.

== Reception ==
Success was widely praised upon publication. The Guardian observed that "Gregory and Terry double the narrative in a way that makes Martin Amis's Success like a kind of two-way mirror"; critic Norman Shrapnel praised the novel's "icy wit" and called the narrative approach "artfully appropriate...[it] builds up an air of profound unreliabiity—entirely fitting, since things are by no means what they seem." In The Observer, critic Anthony Thwaite called the book "a moral homily from which all traces of morality have been removed with the brisk surgery of a razor blade on a fingernail...Success is a terrifying, painfully funny, Swiftian exercise in moral disgust; its exhilarating unpleasantness puts it alongside 'A Modest Proposal'." Critic Hermione Lee observed, "After Martin Amis's Success ... sibling rivalry seems almost as popular as sexual warfare, fictionally speaking." In December 1978, The Observer named Success one of its "Books of the Year."
