= Dead Babies (film) =

- Directed by: William Marsh
- Written by: Martin Amis; William Marsh
- Produced by: Richard Holmes; Neil Peplow; Ben Hilton
- Starring: Paul Bettany; Olivia Williams; Katy Carmichael; Hayley Carr; Charlie Condou; Alexandra Gilbreath
- Cinematography: Daniel Cohen
- Edited by: Eddie Hamilton
- Music by: Marvin Beaver; Mark Pember
- Distributed by: Redbus Film Distribution
- Release date: 2000
- Running time: 101 minutes
- Country: United Kingdom
- Language: English

Dead Babies (Mood Swingers for US release) is a 2000 British film directed by William Marsh. It is based on the 1975 novel of the same name by Martin Amis.

== Plot ==
When a group of young English friends, living together in a bizarre house just outside of London, invite three Americans over for a drug-fuelled weekend, things really kick off.

As the two cultures collide and the chemicals take over, it soon becomes apparent that one of the weekend guests is a member of a newly formed net-based terrorist group, The Conceptualists, whose underlying principle is extreme violence for its own sake.

It also becomes apparent that the assembled guests are the next intended victims for the group's website.

== Cast ==
- Paul Bettany as Quentin
- Katy Carmichael as Lucy Littlejohn
- Hayley Carr as Roxanne
- Charlie Condou as Giles
- Alexandra Gilbreath as Cecilia
- William Marsh as Marvel
- Kris Marshall as Skip
- Andy Nyman as Keith
- Cristian Solimeno as Andy
- Olivia Williams as Diana

== Reception ==
=== Critical reception ===
The film, which was badly received, was reviewed in the British newspaper The Guardian which described it as "boring, embarrassing, nasty and stupid - and not in a good way".
