= Girl, 20 =

1971 novel by Kingsley Amis

- Cover of first edition (hardcover)
- Author: Kingsley Amis
- Cover artist: Bill Botten
- Language: English
- Genre: Comedy, Social Satire
- Publisher: Jonathan Cape
- Publication date: 1971
- Publication place: United Kingdom
- Media type: Print (hardback & paperback)
- ISBN: 0-224-00586-3

Girl, 20 is a novel by Kingsley Amis, first published in 1971. Bill Botten designed the first edition cover.

The novel's anti-hero is Sir Roy Vandervane, a late middle-aged orchestral conductor and composer. He is a committed philanderer who also has pretensions to be at the vanguard of 1960s counter-culture. The novel is narrated by his friend and colleague Douglas Yandell, whose love life is hardly less complex. Sylvia is Sir Roy's (much) younger girlfriend, with wisdom and guile far beyond her years. The plot describes the interactions of the aforementioned and of wife Kitty and daughter Penny.

== Reception ==
The work received positive reviews in the Los Angeles Times, the New York Times, the Daily Telegraph and others.
