= The Folks That Live on the Hill =

1990 novel by Kingsley Amis

- Cover of first edition (hardcover)
- Author: Kingsley Amis
- Cover artist: Matthew Cook
- Language: English
- Genre: Comedy novel
- Publisher: Hutchinson
- Publication date: 1990
- Publication place: United Kingdom
- Media type: Print (hardback & paperback)
- Pages: 246 pp
- ISBN: 0-09-1741378

The Folks That Live on the Hill is Kingsley Amis's twentieth novel, published in 1990.

The novel's protagonist Harry Caldecote, a retired librarian, lives in the fictional Shepherd's Hill area of North London, in fact Primrose Hill. Harry is twice divorced and lives with his sister Clare. The novel describes the interaction of Harry's extended family, son Piers, brother Freddie, sister-in-law Desiree and Fiona and Bunty, who are relatives of his former wives, from the viewpoint of the principal characters. Amis lampoons the attitudes and lifestyles of the North London chattering classes.

== Reception ==
This work was compared favourably with Amis' Booker Prize-winning novel The Old Devils. This late 20th century 'comedy of manners' was described as 'cheerful and gregarious as a crowded saloon bar'. It was also described as 'a pleasant, rambling, sometimes touching tale'.
