= Kingsley Amis =

English author, critic and teacher (1922–1995)

Sir Kingsley Amis CBE
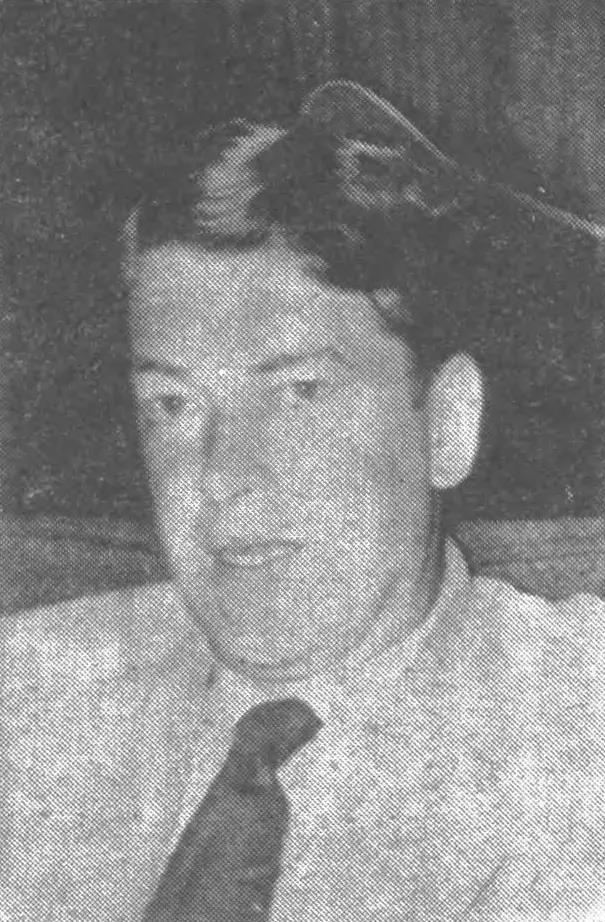
- Amis in 1959
- Born: Kingsley William Amis; 16 April 1922; Clapham, London, England
- Died: 22 October 1995 (aged 73); London, England
- Education: St John's College, Oxford
- Occupations: Novelist; poet; critic; teacher
- Spouses: Hilary Ann Bardwell (m. 1948; div. 1965); Elizabeth Jane Howard (m. 1965; div. 1983)
- Children: Philip Amis; Martin Amis; Sally Amis
- Writing career
- Period: 1947–1995
- Genres: Fiction, fictional prose
- Literary movement: Angry young men

Sir Kingsley William Amis (16 April 1922 – 22 October 1995) was an English novelist, poet, critic and teacher. He wrote more than 20 novels, six volumes of poetry, a memoir, short stories, radio and television scripts, and works of social and literary criticism. He is best known for satirical comedies such as Lucky Jim (1954), One Fat Englishman (1963), Ending Up (1974), Jake's Thing (1978) and The Old Devils (1986). His biographer Zachary Leader called Amis "the finest English comic novelist of the second half of the twentieth century." In 2008, The Times ranked him ninth on a list of the 50 greatest British writers since 1945. He was the father of the novelist Martin Amis. Amis was knighted in 1990.

== Early life ==
Kingsley Amis was born on 16 April 1922 in Clapham, south London, the only child of William Robert Amis (1889–1963), a clerk—"quite an important one, fluent in Spanish and responsible for exporting mustard to South America"—for the mustard manufacturer Colman's in the City of London, and his wife Rosa Annie (née Lucas).

Amis's grandparents were wealthy. William Amis's father, the glass merchant Joseph James Amis, owned a mansion called Barchester at Purley, then part of Surrey. Amis considered J. J. Amis—always called "Pater" or "Dadda"—"a jokey, excitable, silly little man", whom he "disliked and was repelled by". His wife Julia "was a large, dreadful, hairy-faced creature ... whom [Amis] loathed and feared". His mother's parents lived at Camberwell. Her father George was an enthusiastic collector of books and Baptist chapel organist who was employed at a Brixton gentleman's outfitters as a tailor's assistant and was "the only grandparent [Amis] cared for". Amis hoped to inherit much of his grandfather's library, but his grandmother Jemima—whom Amis already disliked for her habit of mocking her husband when he read his favourite passages to Amis, making "faces and gestures at him while his head was lowered to the page"—permitted him to take only five volumes, on condition he wrote "from his grandfather's collection" on the flyleaf of each.

Amis was raised at Norbury—in his later estimation "not really a place. It's an expression on a map ... really I should say I came from Norbury station." Having been educated first at St Hilda's, an "undistinguished, long-vanished local school ... an independent girls' school of the kind which also took small boys, before they became pubescent and dangerous", he then moved to nearby Norbury College. In 1940, the Amises moved to Berkhamsted, Hertfordshire.

== Academic and political career ==
Like his father before him, Amis won a scholarship to the City of London School. In April 1941, after his first year, he was admitted on a scholarship to St John's College, Oxford, where he read English. There he met Philip Larkin, with whom he formed the most important friendship of his life.

In June 1941, Amis joined the Communist Party of Great Britain. He broke with communism in 1956, in view of Soviet leader Nikita Khrushchev's denunciation of Joseph Stalin in his speech "On the Cult of Personality and Its Consequences". In July 1942, he was called up for national service and served in the Royal Corps of Signals. He returned to Oxford in October 1945 to complete his degree. Although he worked hard and earned a first in English in 1947, he had decided by then to give much of his time to writing.

He was a lecturer in English at the University College of Swansea from 1949 to 1961.

Days after Sally's birth, Amis's first novel, Lucky Jim, was published to great acclaim. Critics felt it had caught the flavour of Britain in the 1950s and ushered in a new style of fiction. By 1972, its impressive sales in Britain had been matched by 1.25 million paperback copies sold in the United States. It was translated into 20 languages, including Polish, Hebrew, Korean, and Serbo-Croat. The novel won the Somerset Maugham Award for fiction and Amis became one of the writers known as the Angry Young Men. Lucky Jim was among the first British campus novels, setting a precedent for later generations of writers such as Malcolm Bradbury, David Lodge, Tom Sharpe and Howard Jacobson. As a poet, Amis was associated with The Movement.

In 1958–1959 Amis made the first of two visits to the United States, as a visiting fellow in creative writing at Princeton University and a visiting lecturer at other northeastern universities. On returning to Britain, he fell into a rut, and he began looking for another post. After 13 years at Swansea, Amis became a fellow of Peterhouse, Cambridge, in 1961, but regretted the move within a year, finding Cambridge an academic and social disappointment. He resigned in 1963, intent on moving to Majorca, although he actually moved no further than London.

== Literary work ==
Amis is widely known as a satirist in mid- to late-20th-century Britain, but his literary work included poetry, criticism and essays. At university he met the poet Philip Larkin, with whom he formed a deep friendship, with a quarter of Amis's letters addressed to him.

Amis's first novel, Lucky Jim (1954), was widely perceived as part of the Angry Young Men movement of the 1950s. It satirised the highbrow academic set of an unnamed university through the eyes of a struggling young lecturer of history, and sparked the rise of the campus novel.

That Uncertain Feeling (1955) features a young provincial librarian and his temptation to adultery. I Like It Here (1958) takes a contemptuous view of "abroad" after Amis's own travels on the Continent with a young family. Take a Girl Like You (1960) traces a young schoolmaster's courtship and ultimate seduction of the heroine.

With The Anti-Death League (1966), Amis introduced speculative elements that continued in works such as The Green Man (1969) (mystery/horror) and The Alteration (1976) (alternative history). His interest in science fiction dated to childhood and was reflected in his 1958 Christian Gauss Lectures at Princeton, published as New Maps of Hell: A Survey of Science Fiction.

Amis admired dystopian writers such as Frederik Pohl and C. M. Kornbluth and coined the term "comic inferno" to describe humorous dystopias, particularly those of Robert Sheckley. With Robert Conquest, he co-edited the Spectrum science fiction anthologies, which drew heavily upon 1950s numbers of the magazine Astounding Science Fiction. His novels and poems of the period often engaged with themes of religious doubt and the value of everyday happiness.

Amis also continued to write comic realism in I Want It Now (1968) and Girl, 20 (1971), which depict the "swinging" atmosphere of late-1960s London and his amateur interests such as music.

His essays and criticism were collected in What Became of Jane Austen? and Other Essays (1968), in which he reviewed books such as Colin Wilson's The Outsider, Iris Murdoch's début novel Under the Net, and William Empson's Milton's God.

Amis admired Ian Fleming's James Bond novels, and in the late 1960s began composing works connected with Bond, either under a pseudonym or uncredited. He published The James Bond Dossier (1965) under his own name, The Book of Bond or, Every Man His Own 007 (1965) as "Lt Col. William ('Bill') Tanner", and the continuation novel Colonel Sun (1968) under the pseudonym "Robert Markham".

Critics often called Amis's fiction misogynistic, notably Stanley and the Women (1984). Amis was a prolific womanizer who sometimes felt guilty about it and wrote about that guilt in books like Take a Girl Like You.

Amis edited The New Oxford Book of Light Verse (1978), a revision of an original volume by his friend W. H. Auden. The Amis Anthology (1988), a personal selection of his favourite poems, grew out of his work for a London newspaper, in which he selected a poem a day and gave it a brief introduction.

Amis was shortlisted for the Booker Prize three times, for Ending Up (1974), Jake's Thing (1978), and The Old Devils (1986), the last of which won the prize.

In 2008, The Times ranked Amis 13th on its list of the 50 greatest British writers since 1945.

== Personal life ==
=== Political views ===
Amis joined the Communist Party of Great Britain as a young man at Oxford and left it in 1956. He later called this stage of his political life "the callow Marxist phase that seemed almost compulsory in Oxford". Amis remained nominally on the political left for some time after the war, declaring in the 1950s that he would always vote for the Labour Party.

Amis eventually moved further to the political right, a development he discussed in the essay "Why Lucky Jim Turned Right" (1967); his conservatism and anti-communism are visible in works like the dystopian novel Russian Hide and Seek (1980). In 1967, Amis, Robert Conquest, John Braine, and several other authors signed a letter to The Times titled "Backing for U.S. Policies in Vietnam", supporting the US government in the Vietnam War. He spoke at the Adam Smith Institute, arguing against government subsidy for the arts.

Amis's religious views appear in a response reported in his Memoirs. To the Russian poet Yevgeny Yevtushenko's question, "You atheist?" Amis replied, "It's more that I hate Him."

=== Character ===
By his own admission and according to his biographers, Amis was a serial adulterer for much of his life. This was a major factor in the breakdown of his first marriage. A famous photograph of a sleeping Amis on a Yugoslav beach shows the slogan (written in lipstick by wife Hilary) on his back "1 Fat Englishman—I fuck anything."

In one memoir, Amis wrote, "Now and then I become conscious of having the reputation of being one of the great drinkers, if not one of the great drunks, of our time". He suggests this reflects a naïve tendency in readers to apply the behaviour of his characters to himself. He enjoyed drink and spent a good deal of time in pubs. Hilary Rubinstein, who accepted Lucky Jim for Victor Gollancz, commented, "I doubted whether Jim Dixon would have gone to the pub and drunk ten pints of beer.... I didn't know Kingsley very well, you see."

Clive James commented: "All on his own, he had the weekly drinks bill of a whole table at the Garrick Club even before he was elected. After he was, he would get so tight there that he could barely make it to the taxi." But Amis was adamant that inspiration did not come from a bottle: "Whatever part drink may play in the writer's life, it must play none in his or her work."

This matched a disciplined approach to writing. For "many years" Amis imposed a rigorous daily schedule on himself, segregating writing and drink. Mornings were spent on writing, with a minimum daily output of 500 words. Drinking began about lunchtime, when this had been achieved. Such self-discipline was essential to Amis's prodigious output.

Yet according to James, Amis reached a turning point when his drinking ceased to be social and became a way of dulling his remorse and regret at his behaviour towards Hilly. "Amis had turned against himself deliberately.... It seems fair to guess that the troubled grandee came to disapprove of his own conduct." His friend Christopher Hitchens said: "The booze got to him in the end, and robbed him of his wit and charm as well as of his health."

=== Antisemitism ===
Amis had an unclear relationship with antisemitism, which he sometimes expressed but also claimed to dislike. He occasionally speculated on common Jewish stereotypes. Antisemitism was sometimes present in his conversations and letters to friends and associates, such as "The great Jewish vice is glibness, fluency ... also possibly just bullshit, as in Marx, Freud, Marcuse", or "Chaplin [who was not Jewish] is a horse's arse. He's a Jeeeew you see, like the Marx Brothers, like Danny Kaye." It is a minor theme in Stanley and the Women, about a paranoid schizophrenic. Of the cultural complexion of the United States, Amis said: "I've finally worked out why I don't like Americans ... . Because everyone there is either a Jew or a hick." Amis himself called his antisemitism "very mild".

== Family ==
In 1946 Amis met Hilary Bardwell. They married in 1948 after she became pregnant with their first child, Philip. Amis initially arranged for her to have a back-street abortion, but changed his mind, fearing for her safety. Two other children followed: Martin in August 1949 and Sally in January 1954.

In 1963, Hilary discovered that Amis was having an affair with the novelist Elizabeth Jane Howard. Hilary and Amis separated in August and he went to live with Howard, divorcing Hilary and marrying Howard in 1965. In 1968 he moved with Howard to Lemmons, a house in Barnet, north London. She and Amis divorced in 1983.

In his last years, Amis shared a house with Hilary and her third husband, Alastair Boyd, 7th Baron Kilmarnock, in a deal brokered by their sons to ensure he could be cared for until his death. Martin Amis's memoir Experience describes his father's life, charm and decline.

In August 1995, Amis fell after a suspected stroke. After apparently recovering, he worsened and died on 22 October 1995 at St Pancras Hospital, London. He was cremated and his ashes laid to rest at Golders Green Crematorium.

== Partial bibliography ==
=== Poetry ===
- 1947 Bright November
- 1953 A Frame of Mind
- 1954 Poems: Fantasy Portraits
- 1956 A Case of Samples: Poems 1946–1956
- 1962 The Evans County
- 1968 A Look Round the Estate: Poems, 1957–1967
- 1979 Collected Poems 1944–1979

=== Fiction ===
Novels

- c. 1948 The Legacy (unpublished)
- 1954 Lucky Jim
- 1955 That Uncertain Feeling
- 1958 I Like It Here
- 1960 Take a Girl Like You
- 1963 One Fat Englishman
- 1965 The Egyptologists (with Robert Conquest)
- 1966 The Anti-Death League
- 1968 Colonel Sun: a James Bond Adventure (pseud. Robert Markham)
- 1968 I Want It Now
- 1969 The Green Man
- 1971 Girl, 20
- 1973 The Riverside Villas Murder
- 1974 Ending Up
- 1975 The Crime of the Century
- 1976 The Alteration
- 1978 Jake's Thing
- 1980 Russian Hide-and-Seek
- 1984 Stanley and the Women
- 1986 The Old Devils
- 1988 Difficulties with Girls
- 1990 The Folks That Live on the Hill
- 1991 We Are All Guilty
- 1992 The Russian Girl
- 1994 You Can't Do Both
- 1995 The Biographer's Moustache
- c. 1995 Black and White (unfinished)

Short fiction collections

- 1962 My Enemy's Enemy
- 1980 Collected Short Stories
- 1991 Mr Barrett's Secret and Other Stories

Other short fiction

- 1960 "Hemingway in Space" (short story), Punch, December 1960

=== Non-fiction ===
- 1957 Socialism and the Intellectuals, a Fabian Society pamphlet
- 1960 New Maps of Hell: A Survey of Science Fiction
- 1965 The James Bond Dossier
- 1965 The Book of Bond, or Every Man His Own 007 (pseud. Lt.-Col William ('Bill') Tanner)
- 1970 What Became of Jane Austen?, and Other Questions
- 1972 On Drink
- 1974 Rudyard Kipling and His World
- 1983 Everyday Drinking
- 1984 How's Your Glass?
- 1990 The Amis Collection
- 1991 Memoirs
- 1997 The King's English: A Guide to Modern Usage (name in part a pun as he was sometimes called "Kingers" or "The King" by friends and family, as told by his son Martin in his memoir Experience)
- 2000 The Letters of Kingsley Amis, Edited by Zachary Leader
- 2008 Everyday Drinking: The Distilled Kingsley Amis, Introduction by Christopher Hitchens (an omnibus edition of On Drink, Everyday Drinking and How's Your Glass?)

=== Editor ===
- 1961–66 Spectrum anthology series (ed. with Robert Conquest)(Five volumes)
- 1978 The New Oxford Book of Light Verse (ed.)
- 1981 The Golden Age of Science Fiction (ed.)

== Sources ==
- Amis, Kingsley (1992). Kingsley Amis: Memoirs. Penguin.
- Amis, Kingsley (2000). Leader, Zachary (ed.). The Letters of Kingsley Amis. HarperCollins. ISBN 0-00-257095-5.
- Bradbury, Malcolm (1989). No, Not Bloomsbury. Arena. ISBN 0-09-954410-5.
- Bradford, Richard (2001). Lucky Him: The Life of Kingsley Amis. Peter Owen. ISBN 0-7206-1117-2.
- Fussell, Paul (1994). The Anti-Egotist: Kingsley Amis, Man of Letters. Oxford UP.
- Jacobs, Eric (1995). Kingsley Amis, a Biography. Hodder & Stoughton. ISBN 0-340-59072-6.
- Leader, Zachary (2006). The Life of Kingsley Amis. Jonathan Cape. ISBN 0-224-06227-1.
- Powell, Neil (2008). Amis & Son – Two literary generations. Pan Macmillan. ISBN 9781405054621.
- Ritchie, Harry (1988). Success Stories: Literature and the Media in England, 1950–1959. Faber & Faber. ISBN 0-571-14764-X.
- Dirda, Michael (2007). Kingsley Amis's Troublesome Fun. The Chronicle of Higher Education.
- Amis, Martin (2002). Koba the Dread: Laughter and the Twenty Million. Talk Miramax Books. ISBN 978-1400032204.
