= Dead Babies (novel) =

Novel by Martin Amis

- First UK edition
- Author: Martin Amis
- Language: English
- Publisher: Knopf (US); Jonathan Cape (UK)
- Publication date: 1975
- Publication place: England
- Preceded by: The Rachel Papers
- Followed by: Success

Dead Babies is Martin Amis's second novel, published in 1975 by Jonathan Cape. Its first UK and US paperback edition was published under the title Dark Secrets. Amis's second novel—a parody of Agatha Christie's country-house mysteries—takes place over a single weekend at a manor called Appleseed Rectory. In 2000, the book was adapted into a film of the same name, starring Paul Bettany and Olivia Williams. In 2001, BBC critic David Wood wrote "Amis's second novel ranks among his most incendiary with its mordant wit, black comedy, and sense of the violently absurd." It has an epigraph attributed to the Cynic Menippus and the novel has been interpreted as a Menippean satire.
