= Zachary Leader =

Emeritus Professor of English Literature

Zachary Leader (born 1946) is an emeritus Professor of English Literature at the University of Roehampton.

== Early life and education ==
Leader was born and raised in the U.S. but has lived for over forty years in the United Kingdom. He has dual British and American citizenship.

Leader was an undergraduate at Northwestern University, and did graduate work at Trinity College, Cambridge and Harvard University, where he was awarded a PhD in English in 1977.

== Career ==
His best-known works are The Letters of Kingsley Amis (2001), The Life of Kingsley Amis (2007), a finalist for the 2008 Pulitzer Prize in Biography, and The Life of Saul Bellow: To Fame and Fortune, 1915-1964 (2015), which was shortlisted for the Wingate Prize in the U.K. The Life of Saul Bellow: Love and Strife 1965 to 2005 was published in 2018.

He has written and edited a dozen books, including both volumes of the Saul Bellow biography, and is General Editor of The Oxford History of Life-Writing, a seven-volume series published by OUP. He is a recipient of Guggenheim, Whiting, Huntington, Leverhulme and British Academy Fellowships. He is also a Fellow of the Royal Society of Literature.

== List of publications ==
- Reading Blake's Songs, (London and Boston: Routledge and Kegan Paul), 259pp. (1981)
- Writer's Block, (London and Baltimore: The Johns Hopkins University Press), 320pp. (1991)
- Revision and Romantic Authorship, (Oxford: Clarendon Press, 1996; pbk, 1999), 354pp. (1996)
- Romantic Period Writings 1798-1832: An Anthology, co-edited with Ian Haywood (London and Boston: Routledge, pbk), 254pp. (1999)
- The Letters of Kingsley Amis, edited by Z. Leader, London: HarperCollins, 2000; New York: Talk/Miramax, 1208pp. (2001)
- On Modern British Fiction, edited by Z. Leader, Oxford: Oxford University Press, 319pp. (2002)
- Percy Bysshe Shelley: The Major Works, co-edited by Z. Leader and M. O'Neill, Oxford and New York: Oxford University Press, 845pp. (2003)
- The Life of Kingsley Amis, Hardcover, New York: Random House, 1008 pp. (2006)
- The Movement Reconsidered: Essays on Larkin, Amis, Gunn, Davie and Their Contemporaries, edited by Z. Leader, Oxford: Oxford University Press, 336pp. (2008)
- The Life of Saul Bellow: To Fame and Fortune, 1915-1964 (London: Jonathan Cape, 2015; New York: Alfred Knopf), 812pp. (2015)
- On Life-Writing, edited by Z. Leader (Oxford: Oxford University Press), 315pp. (2015)
- The Life of Saul Bellow: Love and Strife, 1965-2005 (London: Jonathan Cape; New York: Alfred Knopf), 784pp (2018)
- Ellmann's Joyce: The Biography of a Masterpiece and Its Maker (Harvard: Harvard University Press), 464pp. (2025)
