= The Spy Who Loved Me (soundtrack) =

Soundtrack album by Marvin Hamlisch
- Released: 1977
- Recorded: April 1977
- Label: EMI
- Producer: Frank Collura (Reissue)

Marvin Hamlisch chronology
The Sting (1974)	The Spy Who Loved Me (1977)	The Absent-Minded Waiter (1977)

Singles from The Spy Who Loved Me
- 1. "Nobody Does It Better" Released: July 1977

The Spy Who Loved Me is the 1977 soundtrack for the tenth James Bond film The Spy Who Loved Me. The soundtrack is one of only two Bond soundtracks to be nominated for the Academy Award for Best Original Score at the 50th Academy Awards. The other score nominated was Skyfall (2012) at the 85th Academy Awards.

== Theme song ==
The film The Spy Who Loved Me's theme song "Nobody Does It Better" was composed by Marvin Hamlisch with lyrics by Carole Bayer Sager, and was performed by Carly Simon. It was nominated for Academy Award for Best Original Song at the 50th Academy Awards but lost to "You Light Up My Life" from the film of the same name. It is one of six Bond theme songs to be nominated for the award, alongside Paul McCartney and Wings' "Live and Let Die" from the film of the same name in 1973, Sheena Easton's "For Your Eyes Only" from the film of the same name in 1981, Adele's "Skyfall" from the film of the same name in 2012, Sam Smith's "Writing's on the Wall" from Spectre in 2015 and Billie Eilish's "No Time to Die" from the film of the same name in 2021. "Skyfall" went on to win the award in 2013, "Writing's on the Wall" in 2016 and "No Time to Die" in 2021. Additionally, "The Look of Love" from the 1967 Bond parody film Casino Royale was also nominated in this category.

It was the first theme song with a title different from the film's, although the phrase "the spy who loved me" is in the lyrics. Hamlisch states in the documentary on the film's DVD that the song's opening bars were influenced by a riff in a Wolfgang Amadeus Mozart tune. The driving disco rhythm to "Bond '77" is very similar to the Bee Gees' 1976 single "You Should Be Dancing".

The theme song became a hit that is still popular today and has been featured in numerous films includingLost in Translation (2003), Little Black Book (2004), Bridget Jones: The Edge of Reason (2004) and Mr. & Mrs. Smith (2005). In 2004, the song was honoured by the American Film Institute as the 67th greatest film song as part of their 100 Years...100 Songs countdown.

It also featured in a UK TV commercial for the England-based Unigate Dairy powdered milk brand Five Pints where, as the commercial tailed out, the relevant session singers could be heard singing "Five Pints...you're the best".

== Soundtrack ==
The film's soundtrack was composed by Marvin Hamlisch, who filled in for usual Bond composer John Barry, as Barry was unavailable for work in the United Kingdom due to tax reasons. The soundtrack, in comparison to other Bond films of the time, is more disco-oriented and included a new disco rendition of the "James Bond Theme", titled "Bond 77" which Hamlisch said was influenced by "You Should Be Dancing" by The Bee Gees

An element of the Barry style remains in the suspenseful film sequence in which James Bond (Roger Moore) and Anya Amasova (Barbara Bach) try to track down Jaws (Richard Kiel) at an antiquated site in Egypt. The accompanying Hamlisch music echoes Barry's "Stalking," from the pre-credit fantasy sequence of From Russia with Love, featuring Bond (Sean Connery) and villain Red Grant (Robert Shaw).

A large percentage of the music in the film was re-recorded for the soundtrack album and, therefore, does not sound exactly like the music in the film, the track "Bond '77" being the most obvious. It is a cue that was recorded several times specifically for different moments of the film (the opening ski chase, the car chase on land, then underwater and the gun battle with the troops on the Liparus). The soundtrack album uses a different 'medley' version, slower in pace, which features aspects of most of the variations of the track used throughout the film, compiled into one piece. This version was also released as a 7" single on United Artists Records (the track "Ride to Atlantis" was the b-side). The main theme by Simon also differs in the film; it has a fade out on the album/single but in the film's opening titles, it has a more abrupt ending, finishing with a long electronic note. The track "Anya" on the album does not feature in the film. There are also many cues used in the film that have yet to appear on any soundtrack release.

== Track listing ==
1. "Nobody Does It Better (Main Title)" – Carly Simon – 3:29
2. "Bond 77" – 4:19 (Contains The James Bond Theme)
3. "Ride to Atlantis" – 3:28
4. "Mojave Club" – 2:13
5. "Nobody Does It Better (Instrumental)" – 4:43
6. "Anya" – 3:19
7. "The Tanker" – 4:24
8. "The Pyramids" – 1:37
9. "Eastern Lights" – 3:22
10. "Conclusion" – 1:37
11. "Nobody Does It Better (End Title)" – Carly Simon – 3:25

In addition, Hamlisch incorporates into his score several pieces of classical music. As Karl Stromberg (Curd Jürgens) feeds his duplicitous secretary Kate Chapman (Marilyn Galsworthy) to a shark, the villain plays Johann Sebastian Bach's "Air on the G String". He then plays the second movement's opening string section, Andante, of Mozart's Piano Concerto No. 21 as Atlantis rises from the sea.

"Nocturne No. 8 in D-Flat, Op. 27 No. 2" by Frédéric Chopin crops up later, when Bond first meets Stromberg, as reportedly does an excerpt from Camille Saint-Saëns' "The Aquarium" from The Carnival of the Animals.

Finally, Hamlisch segued his score into an excerpt from that of David Lean's 1962 film Lawrence of Arabia when Bond and Anya Amasova are wandering through the desert; according to a documentary on the DVD, this idea was originally a joke by one of the film editors who played the music over the dailies of the scene. It became a trend, with the subsequent two films in the series similarly referencing 'classic' film music within their scores. "Mojave Club", "The Tanker" and "Eastern Lights" were written by Paul Buckmaster, who also contributed with arrangements and orchestrations.

== Personnel ==
=== Musicians ===
- Marvin Hamlisch – conductor, orchestra, piano, Rhodes Fender Piano (tracks: 4, 9)
- Barry Desouza – drums
- Paul Robinson – drums
- Laurence Juber – guitar soloist
- Chris Rae – second electric guitar
- Mike Egan – acoustic guitar
- Bruce Lynch – bass guitar
- Brian Odges – bass guitar
- Derick Plater – saxophone soloist
- Carly Simon – lead vocals (tracks: 1, 11)
- Jeffrey Poccaro – syndrums (tracks 1, 11)
- Ron Aspery – flute, soprano saxophone (tracks: 4, 9)
- Hugo – mandola (tracks: 4, 9)
- Paul Buckmaster – cello, synthesizer
- Fre Goodyear – bass guitar (tracks: 4, 9)
- Brother James – congas, percussion (tracks: 4, 9)

=== Production ===
- Producer – Marvin Hamlisch
- Producer – Richard Perry (tracks 1, 11)
- Conductor (Assistant) – Geoff Westley
- Conductor – Marvin Hamlisch
- Contractor – David Katz
- Engineer (Assistant) – Colin Fairley
- Engineer (Sound Balance) – Mike Stavrou

== Charts ==
Chart (1977/78)	Peak position
Australia (Kent Music Report)	56

== See also ==
- Outline of James Bond
