= Danica Thrall =

English television personality (born 1988)

- Born: Sonia Danica Thrall; 30 March 1988 (age 38); Derby, England
- Occupations: Model; reality television personality
- Years active: 2006–2016
- Modeling information
- Hair color: Blonde
- Eye color: Hazel

Sonia Danica Thrall (born 30 March 1988) is an English glamour model and reality television personality.

== Career ==
Thrall was discovered in 2006 when she won Miss Derby, organised by Lucie Hide, and went on to compete in the Miss England pageant, where she placed in the Top 10.

After a hiatus from modelling, Thrall began a stint as a presenter on televised sex line Elite TV, where she engaged in lesbian softcore pornography with fellow presenters. Thrall returned to modelling in late 2010 with appearances in magazines such as FHM, Maxim, Loaded and Nuts, as well as lingerie catalogue work.

In May 2012, Thrall received significant media attention after appearing in the documentary Sex, Lies & Rinsing Guys, which documented the practice of "rinsing", that of chatting to men on the Internet with them in return sending her presents, for instance gifts from her Amazon.com wishlist.

In August 2012, she was a housemate in the tenth series of Celebrity Big Brother. Thrall was the fifth housemate to be evicted, in a double eviction with journalist Samantha Brick, ultimately staying in for seventeen of the twenty-four days.

Thrall placed 10th on Google's Zeitgeist list of Top trending British people for 2012.
