= Wet Nellie =

1976 car-shaped submarine from the James Bond film The Spy Who Loved Me

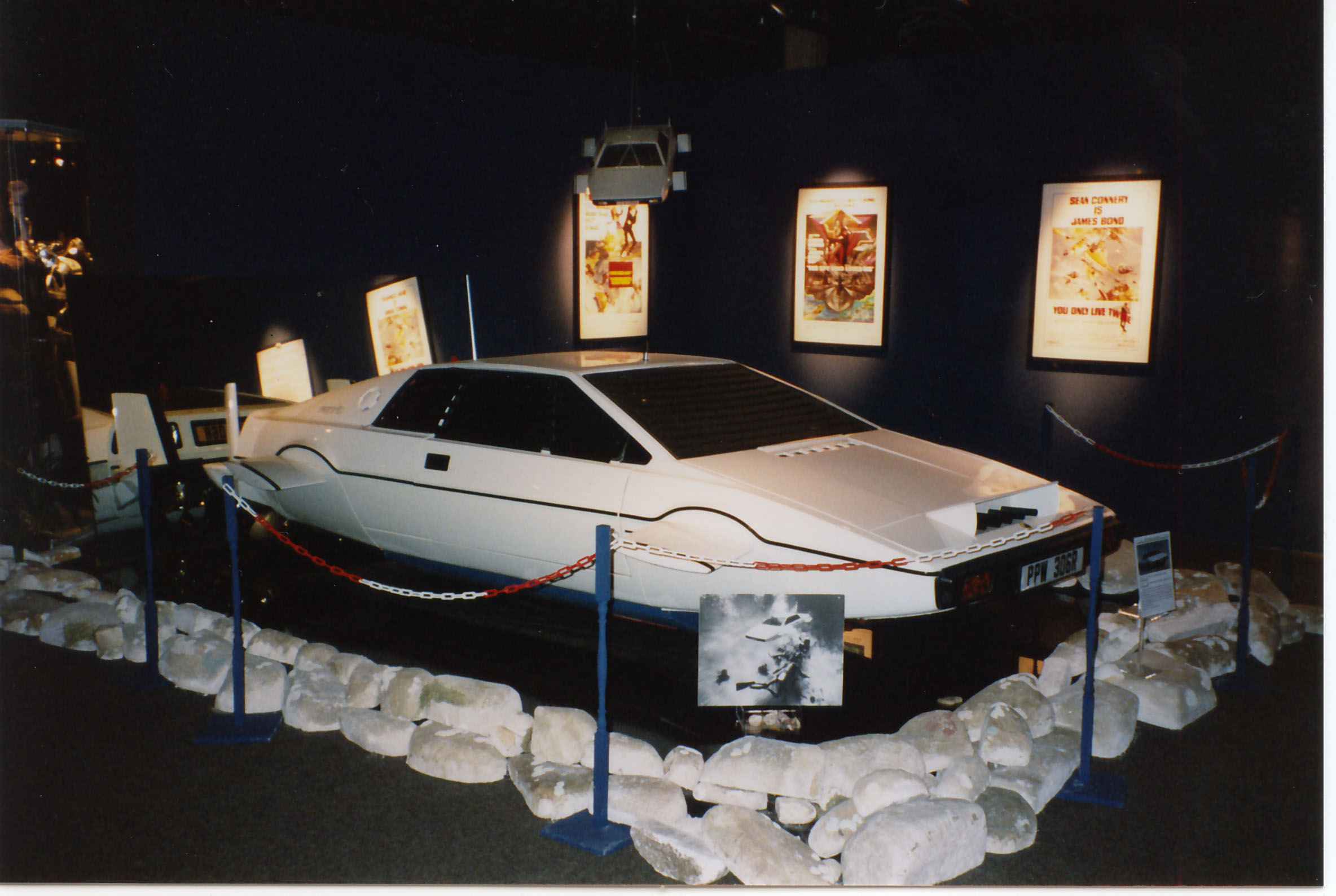
- Wet Nellie

History
- Name: Wet Nellie
- Namesake: Little Nellie
- Owner: Elon Musk (since 2013)
- Ordered: 1976
- Builder: Perry Oceanographic, Inc.
- Cost: $100,000
- Laid down: 1976
- Launched: 1976
- Sponsored by: Eon Productions
- Completed: 1976
- Acquired: 2013
- Commissioned: 1976
- Maiden voyage: 1976
- In service: 1976

General characteristics
- Class & type: Customized Lotus Esprit
- Type: Wet sub
- Length: 14 feet (4.3 m)
- Beam: 6 feet (1.8 m)
- Height: 4 feet (1.2 m)
- Propulsion: 4 electric motors
- Capacity: 2
- Crew: 2

"Wet Nellie" is the behind-the-scenes name given to a custom-built submarine, created for the 1977 James Bond film The Spy Who Loved Me in the shape of a Lotus Esprit S1 sports car. The Esprit was chosen to give James Bond a glamorous car to drive. "Wet Nellie" is named in reference to Little Nellie, an autogyro featured in the James Bond film You Only Live Twice, which was itself named after actress and comedian Nellie Wallace.

== Construction ==
The submarine does not maintain a dry interior, and thus is a "wet sub" that requires occupants to don scuba gear. It was built by Perry Oceanographic, Inc., of Riviera Beach, Florida, United States, specifically for the film, using a Lotus Esprit S1 bodyshell, for about $100,000. The wedge shape of the Esprit is designed to provide downforce, which would cause the submarine to dive. This undesirable force was compensated for by fins placed where the wheels would be in a conventional Esprit. The sub requires a crew of two to operate. It has four electric motors that allowed forward motion only. The interior bears no resemblance to that of a car, being just a platform for the scuba divers, and the equipment used to operate, drive, and power the sub.

== Filming ==
During filming of The Spy Who Loved Me, the submarine was piloted by ex-U.S. Navy SEAL Don Griffin. The fictional history of the car in the film was that it was developed by Q-Branch of MI6, and its blueprints were stolen by KGB agent Anya Amasova (after Bond asked Amasova "How did you know about that?" Amasova replied, "I stole the blueprints of this car two years ago"). In filming, six Esprits were used (registration "PPW 306R"), though only one submarine. Three of the Esprits were just empty bodyshells which were used to show each phase of the car-to-submarine transformation. A miniature model was used for the car's initial underwater shot as it landed in the sea. Two unpowered dummy cars fitted with wheels were used to show the Esprit entering and emerging from the sea; the first was designed to be fired from an air cannon off the end of the pier, the second was towed by a rope buried under the beach with a sweeping brush fitted to the underside to cover the rope up as the car was tugged out. When an additional road car was needed for the chase sequences the producers borrowed Lotus chairman Colin Chapman's personal vehicle.

== Post-film life ==
Upon completion of filming, the submarine went on a promotional tour. Afterwards, it was shipped to Long Island, New York, and placed in storage. The storage unit was prepaid for 10 years; at the end of the lease, no one claimed the contents, so the contents of the storage locker were placed on auction. The buyer paid less than $100 for the unit. The buyers did not know the contents when they bought it, and from 1989 to 2013 occasionally exhibited the submarine. The then owner, also owner of a tool rental shop, had the exterior restored. It was put up for auction as a Bond car in 2013. In September 2013, the submarine sold at auction for £550,000, at RM Auctions in Battersea, south west London. Elon Musk bought the vehicle, and as of 2013, planned to convert it into the functional car-submarine from the film. Musk stated that he plans to use Tesla Motors' electric drive train in making his conversion a reality.

== See also ==
- List of James Bond vehicles
