= Celebrity Big Brother (British TV series) series 10 =

Season of television series

Celebrity Big Brother
- Series 10
- Series ten logo
- Presented by: Brian Dowling
- No. of days: 24
- No. of housemates: 13
- Winner: Julian Clary
- Runner-up: Coleen Nolan
- Companion show: Big Brother's Bit on the Side
- No. of episodes: 26

Release
- Original network: Channel 5
- Original release: 15 August – 7 September 2012

Series chronology
- ← Previous; Series 9 Next → Series 11

Celebrity Big Brother 10 is the tenth series of the British reality television series Celebrity Big Brother. It launched on 15 August 2012, two days after the final of Big Brother 13, and aired on Channel 5 and 5* for 24 days until 7 September 2012. It was the third celebrity series to air on Channel 5 as part of a contract extension of the current two-year contract with Endemol, and the fifth series of Big Brother to air on Channel 5 since they acquired the show. The series was sponsored by hair product brand Schwarzkopf Live Color XXL. It was won by comedian Julian Clary, with television presenter Coleen Nolan as runner-up. First evictee, Jasmine Lennard, later appeared as a guest for a two-day stint on Big Brother 16.

Coleen Nolan returned to the house for Celebrity Big Brother 19 as an All-Star representing this series. She won this series.

== Format ==
Celebrity Big Brother is a game show in which a group of celebrity contestants, referred to as housemates, live in isolation from the outside world in a custom built "house", constantly under video surveillance. During their time in the House, the housemates are required to nominate two of their fellow contestants for potential eviction, and the two or more with the most votes would be nominated. This process is mandatory for all housemates, and failure to comply could result in expulsion from the House. The public then vote, with one of those celebrities evicted from the house. When the final week arrives, the viewers vote for which of the remaining celebrities should win the series, and the housemate with the most votes becomes the winner.

During their time in the House, housemates are given weekly tasks to perform. The housemates wager a portion of their weekly shopping budget on the task, and either win double their wagered fund or lose the wagered fund depending on their performance in the task. The housemates are required to work as a group to complete their tasks, with the format of the tasks varying based on the number of remaining housemates. Throughout the series, some housemates have been given secret tasks that must either be completed individually or with a small group; failure to do so can result in the housemate being nominated or punished in the House. Should the housemates run out of the food provided for them, an emergency ration was available to them. The housemates are forbidden from discussing nominations, and doing so could result in punishment. The format of the series is mainly seen as a social experiment, and requires housemates to interact with others who may have differing ideals, beliefs, and prejudices. Housemates are also required to make visits to the Diary Room during their stay in the House, where they are able to share their thoughts and feelings on their fellow housemates and the game.

== Housemates ==
Celebrity	Age on entry	Notability	Day entered	Day exited	Status
Julian Clary	53	Comedian	1	24	Winner
Coleen Nolan	47	The Nolans singer and Loose Women panellist	1	24	Runner-up
Martin Kemp	50	EastEnders actor and Spandau Ballet bassist	1	24	3rd place
The Situation	31	Reality TV star	1	24	4th place
Ashley McKenzie	23	Judoka	1	24	5th place
MC Harvey	33	Rapper	1	24	6th place
Julie Goodyear	70	Coronation Street actress	1	22	Evicted
Prince Lorenzo	40	Italian prince and entrepreneur	1	22	Evicted
Danica Thrall	24	Glamour model and TV personality	1	17	Evicted
Samantha Brick	41	Journalist and writer	1	17	Evicted
Rhian Sugden	25	Glamour model	1	15	Evicted
Cheryl Fergison	46	EastEnders actress	1	10	Evicted
Jasmine Lennard	27	Fashion model	1	8	Evicted

=== Ashley McKenzie ===
Ashley McKenzie (born 17 July 1989) is an English judoka and member of the Great Britain judo squad competing in the men's 60 kg category. At the 2012 Summer Olympics, he was defeated in the second round. Having received only one nomination and never facing eviction for his entire stay, Ashley made the final on Day 24. He left the house in fifth position.

=== Cheryl Fergison ===
Cheryl Fergison (born 27 August 1965) is an English actress, most notable for playing Heather Trott in EastEnders. On Day 1, Cheryl, along with fellow housemate Julie were set a secret mission in which they had to follow Big Brother's directions in order to create drama in the house. Since they performed to Big Brother's satisfaction, they won their housemates a party. She was nominated for eviction on Day 8. On Day 10, she received the fewest votes and became the second housemate to be evicted from the house, despite the bookmaker's favourites to win the show.

=== Coleen Nolan ===
Coleen Patricia Nolan (born 12 March 1965) is an English television presenter, author, singer, and the youngest member of the girl group The Nolans. Nolan has since been a panellist on Loose Women and a contestant on Dancing on Ice. She was nominated for eviction on Day 8. Coleen made the Big Brother Final and was declared this year's runner up, finishing in 2nd place. She later returned to compete in Celebrity Big Brother 19 as an "All star" housemate where she became the winner.

=== Danica Thrall ===
Sonia Danica Thrall, known by her modelling name Danica Thrall (born 30 March 1988) is a model and reality TV personality, known for appearing in the documentary Sex, Lies & Rinsing Guys and being a regular presenter on televised sex line Elite TV. She was nominated for eviction on Day 15, but survived the vote. She was evicted on Day 17 in a double eviction.

=== Harvey ===
Michael Harvey, Jr (born 1 May 1979), aka MC Harvey, is an English musician and former non-league footballer, best known as a member of So Solid Crew. Harvey made the final on Day 24 after never facing eviction during his entire stay within the Big Brother house. He was the first to leave on finale night finishing in 6th place.

=== Jasmine Lennard ===
Jasmine Lennard (born 25 July 1985) is an English model, known for appearing on Make Me a Supermodel and for her publicised affair with Simon Cowell. On Day 3, in the face-to-face nominations she received three votes, and so was put up for eviction with Rhian. She received the fewest votes and so on Day 8 became the first person to be evicted. On Day 11, she returned to the diary room and task room in the 'Like Mother Like Daughter' task, in which her mother, Marilyn Galsworthy, entered the house whilst Jasmine gave her instructions via a hidden earpiece.

=== Julian Clary ===
Julian Peter McDonald Clary (born 25 May 1959) is an English comedian and novelist, known for his deliberately stereotypical camp style, with a heavy reliance on innuendo and double entendre. He has also acted in films, television, and on stage. He was nominated for eviction on Day 8 but survived and later went on to become the winner of the series on Day 24.

=== Julie Goodyear ===
Julie Goodyear, MBE (born Julie Kemp, 29 March 1942) is an English actress, best known for playing the long-running role of Bet Lynch on soap opera Coronation Street for over 28 years. On Day 1, Julie was the first housemate to enter the Celebrity Big Brother House, where she was given a secret mission along with fellow housemate Cheryl where they both had to create drama in the house by following instructions by Big Brother through earpieces. They both performed to Big Brother's satisfaction and won a party in the garden. She became the seventh celebrity to be evicted from the house on Day 22, losing out to Martin and a place in the Big Brother Final.

=== Martin Kemp ===
Martin John Kemp (born 10 October 1961) is an English actor and musician, best known as the bassist in the New Romantic band Spandau Ballet, as well as for his portrayal as Steve Owen in EastEnders. He was nominated for eviction on Day 19 and having survived made the Big Brother final on Day 24 leaving the house in 3rd place.

=== Prince Lorenzo ===
Lorenzo Borghese (born 9 June 1972), commonly known as Prince Lorenzo, is a member of the House of Borghese, a cosmetics entrepreneur and animal advocate and the featured bachelor on the ninth series of The Bachelor. He was nominated for eviction on Day 8. Prince Lorenzo was evicted from the house on Day 22 after receiving the fewest viewer votes.

=== Rhian Sugden ===
Rhian Sugden (born 11 September 1986) is an English glamour model and Page 3 girl. She was nominated for eviction on Day 3 with Jasmine Lennard but survived the vote. She was then nominated again on Day 12 and was evicted on Day 15.

=== Samantha Brick ===
Samantha Brick (born 1971) is a journalist who is publicly known for a column in the Daily Mail, Why Women Hate Me for Being Beautiful. On Day 17, she was the fourth housemate to be evicted, after losing votes to Coleen and Danica.

=== The Situation ===
Michael Sorrentino (born 4 July 1982), aka "The Situation", is best known as a cast member on the American reality show Jersey Shore. He was nominated for eviction on Day 8, but survived. On Day 24, finale night, he finished in fourth place.

== Nominations table ==
	Day 3	Day 8	Day 12	Day 15	Day 19	Day 24 Final		Nominations received
Julian	The Situation	The Situation, Prince Lorenzo	Samantha, Prince Lorenzo	Samantha, The Situation	Prince Lorenzo, Martin	Winner (Day 24)		9
Coleen	Rhian	The Situation, Julie	The Situation, Samantha	Samantha, The Situation	Julie, Martin	Runner-up (Day 24)		10
Martin	Jasmine	Coleen, Rhian	Danica, Harvey	Samantha, Julian	Julie, Julian	Third place (Day 24)		6
The Situation	Coleen	Coleen, Cheryl	Danica, Prince Lorenzo	~~Coleen~~, ~~Danica~~	Banned	Fourth place (Day 24)		10
Ashley	Prince Lorenzo	Danica, Julian	Danica, Rhian	Danica, Coleen	Julie, Martin	Fifth place (Day 24)		1
Harvey	Danica	Danica, Julian	Danica, Coleen	Danica, Prince Lorenzo	Prince Lorenzo, Julie	Sixth place (Day 24)		2
Julie	Coleen	Prince Lorenzo, Coleen	Rhian, Danica	Danica, Coleen	The Situation, Prince Lorenzo	Evicted (Day 22)		7
Prince Lorenzo	Jasmine	Cheryl, Julian	Julian, The Situation	Julian, Julie	Julie, Harvey	Evicted (Day 22)		10
Danica	Jasmine	Julian, Prince Lorenzo	Martin, Samantha	Samantha, Ashley	Evicted (Day 17)			15
Samantha	Rhian	Julian, Rhian	Rhian, Danica	Coleen, Danica	Evicted (Day 17)			9
Rhian	Martin	Samantha, Cheryl	Martin, The Situation	Evicted (Day 15)				8
Cheryl	Rhian	The Situation, Samantha	Evicted (Day 10)					3
Jasmine	Danica	Evicted (Day 8)						3
Notes	1	none		2	3	4		
Against public vote	Jasmine, Rhian	Cheryl, Coleen, Julian, Prince Lorenzo, The Situation	Danica, Rhian, Samantha, The Situation	Coleen, Danica, Samantha	Julie, Martin, Prince Lorenzo	Ashley, Coleen, Harvey, Julian, Martin, The Situation		
Evicted	Jasmine; Fewest votes to save	Cheryl; Fewest votes (out of 3) to save	Rhian; Fewest votes to save	Samantha; Fewest votes (out of 3) to save	Prince Lorenzo; Fewest votes to save	Harvey; Fewest votes (out of 6)	Martin; Fewest votes (out of 3)	
Evicted	Jasmine; Fewest votes to save	Cheryl; Fewest votes (out of 3) to save	Rhian; Fewest votes to save	Samantha; Fewest votes (out of 3) to save	Prince Lorenzo; Fewest votes to save	Ashley; Fewest votes (out of 5)	Martin; Fewest votes (out of 3)	
Evicted	Jasmine; Fewest votes to save	Cheryl; Fewest votes (out of 3) to save	Rhian; Fewest votes to save	Samantha; Fewest votes (out of 3) to save	Prince Lorenzo; Fewest votes to save	Ashley; Fewest votes (out of 5)	Coleen; Fewest votes (out of 2)	
Evicted	Jasmine; Fewest votes to save	Cheryl; Fewest votes (out of 3) to save	Rhian; Fewest votes to save	Danica; Fewest votes (out of 2) to save	Julie; Fewest votes to save	The Situation; Fewest votes (out of 4)	Coleen; Fewest votes (out of 2)	
Evicted	Jasmine; Fewest votes to save	Cheryl; Fewest votes (out of 3) to save	Rhian; Fewest votes to save	Danica; Fewest votes (out of 2) to save	Julie; Fewest votes to save	Julian; Most votes to win		

Notes

- ^Note 1: On Day 3, housemates nominated face-to-face during a live broadcast. In a change to the usual format, each housemate was only allowed to make one nomination. The housemates were then allowed to discuss the nominations for the rest of that night.
- ^Note 2: Shortly after Rhian's eviction on Day 15, housemates were required to nominate two housemates for eviction, face-to-face. The housemates were then allowed to discuss the nominations for the rest of that night. A double eviction took place on Day 17, meaning the three or more housemates with the most votes faced eviction.
- ^Note 3: On Day 16, The Situation was punished after being caught cheating during Day 15 face-to-face nominations. Big Brother deemed his votes void and banned him from nominating for the rest of the series. Another double eviction took place on Day 22.
- ^Note 4: For the final two days the public were voting for who they wanted to win rather than to save.

== Summary ==
Day 1	Entrances	Julie, Cheryl, The Situation, Julian, Rhian, Harvey, Samantha, Prince Lorenzo, Danica, Ashley, Coleen, Jasmine, and Martin entered the house.
Day 1	Tasks	Julie and Cheryl were given a secret mission in which they had to cause as much drama as they could by following Big Brother's instructions through an ear piece which was handed to them through the diary room on the launch. The task saw Julie and Cheryl have a fight about an affair Julie had with one of Cheryl's ex-boyfriends. The task ended with an argument climaxing with Julie throwing a drink in Cheryl's face. They both successfully passed the task and won the house a soap opera themed party in the garden.
Day 2	Tasks	Julian and The Situation were called to the Diary Room in order to participate in "The Moment of Truth" task, in which they found two boards matching phrases to the other housemates' faces. As the pair were giving the answers, the other housemates had to stand behind a podium with a corresponding bubble they believe represents them the most, peeling off a square from the podium to reveal whether they are correct. Julian and The Situation had to match every housemate and statement correctly in order to pass. As they incorrectly matched Danica, Julie, Martin, and Rhian, they ultimately failed the task.
Day 3	Tasks	As part of the female housemates' secret mission, they must flirt with Prince Lorenzo in hopes of being picked as his princess. The princess will be given royal treatment from Lorenzo for the rest of the day, showered with gifts provided by HRH Big Brother. Prince Lorenzo chose Samantha to be his princess.
Day 3	Nominations	The housemates nominated for the first time. Jasmine and Rhian received the most nominations and faced the public vote.
Day 4	Tasks	Julian and Julie became team captains, in which they had to judge the other housemates' talents and then select each housemate to represent their team. A vote on the Big Brother website determined involving representatives Ashley and Harvey, saw Ashley's team winning along with captain Julian a VIP party that night.
Day 6	Tasks	In order to win a luxury shopping budget, housemates were given £1000, and had to spend as much of it as possible.
Day 7	Tasks	As part of winning a luxury shopping budget, Big Brother chose Jasmine and Rhian to spend the £725 budget, exclusively outside the House. In the late night hours, they were transported to a local Morrisons, each taking turns in a trolley dash. If they spent more than the budget, they would lose all the groceries. Their groceries totaled £438.65, successfully allowing them to bring all the groceries back to the House.
Day 8	Exits	Jasmine was evicted from the house, receiving the fewest votes to save.
Day 8	Nominations	The housemates nominated for the second time. Cheryl, Colleen, Julian, Prince Lorenzo and The Situation received the most nominations and faced the public vote.
Day 10	Tasks	Housemates participated in the task "The Majority Rules". In this task, the housemates were asked questions and instead of answering the correct answer, housemates had to ensure that they voted with the majority. Anyone who didn't vote with the majority were gunged.
Day 10	Exits	Cheryl was evicted from the house, receiving the fewest votes to save.
Day 11	Entrances	Jasmine's mother, Marilyn Galsworthy entered the House for the "Like Mother, Like Daughter" task. (See tasks).
Day 11	Tasks	Marilyn introduced herself to the other housemates as a new housemate, celebrity psychic 'Shelly'. However, 'Shelly' was actually on a secret mission by Big Brother and was controlled by Jasmine herself throughout the day via. a special earpiece.
Day 12	Nominations	The housemates nominated for the third time. Danica, Rhian, Samantha and The Situation received the most nominations and faced the public vote.
Day 12	Tasks	Julian was set a task to read the housemates a bedtime story and was provided with a picture book filled with images of each housemate and an object of description. If Big Brother was satisfied with Julian's narration of the story, then he will be awarded with a special prize. He successfully passed the task, and was awarded with a visit from his two dogs in the Diary Room.
Day 13	Tasks	For this week's shopping task, housemates participated in a task called "Gods and mortals", in which Julie and Martin were selected to be the Gods, whilst the other housemates were the mortals. The Gods set a series of challenges for the mortals, which included blindfolding them to beat the hairs out of Medusa's heads using a bat. If the mortals passed each of the challenges, they would become a God. After completing the challenges, the Gods faced in ultimate battles each other for power. Prince Lorenzo had won the final battle, against Martin. It was later revealed that the housemates successfully passed the task, and were awarded their weekly shopping budget.
Day 15	Exits	Rhian was evicted from the house, receiving the fewest votes to save.
Day 15	Nominations	The housemates nominated for the fourth time. Colleen, Danica and Samantha received the most nominations and faced the public vote.
Day 16	Punishments	The Situation was punished by Big Brother, after being caught cheating during the face-to-face nominations on Day 15. As a result, his nominations for the upcoming eviction were voided and he was ultimately banned from nominating during the rest of the series.
Day 17	Tasks	Coleen hosted a daytime chat show, where she and the other female housemates discussed a series of topics set by Big Brother. This included Samantha's views on a successful marriage, Danica's attitude to flirting, and Julie's thoughts on being a celebrity.
Day 17	Exits	Samantha and Danica were evicted from the house, respectively, receiving the fewest votes to save.
Day 19	Nominations	The housemates nominated for the fifth and final time. Julie, Martin and Prince Lorenzo received the most nominations and faced the public vote.
Day 20	Tasks	Housemates became television stars for a two-day task. Julie had to read the news, whilst Ashley, Prince Lorenzo and Martin appeared together on a kids show.
Day 21	Tasks	The television task continued, with Harvey and The Situation competing against each other as quiz contestants, and Julian and Coleen hosting Big Brother's shopping channel, entitled Big Brother's Big Deals.
Day 22	Exits	Prince Lorenzo and Julie were evicted from the house, respectively, receiving the fewest votes to save.
Day 24	Exits	Harvey left the house in sixth place, Ashley left the house in fifth place, The Situation left the house in fourth place, and Martin left the house in third place. It was then revealed that Julian was the winner, leaving Colleen as the runner-up.

== Production ==
=== Background ===
Initially, only one series of Big Brother and Celebrity Big Brother was planned to air once a year over the span of two years, but on 27 March 2012, Channel 5 announced that a second celebrity series would air in 2012. This is the first time that two series of Celebrity Big Brother have been broadcast in the same year. It was also only the second edition to be shown in summer instead of winter. Big Brother 13 was originally planned to run for thirteen weeks but was cut back to ten weeks to accommodate this series.

=== Adverts ===
The first trailer for the series was broadcast on 9 August, which showed host Brian Dowling in the Diary Room, with Big Brother telling him who would be entering the House, reacting excitedly. A teaser clip showing facial features of all the celebrity housemates was shown on 11 August 2012.

=== Logo ===
The eye logo for the series was revealed on 4 August 2012. The eye remained similar to the Big Brother 13 logo, but with the iconic Celebrity Big Brother star in the centre and the rest of the eye reversed.

=== Voting ===
The only way for viewers to vote during this series was by calling a premium rate telephone number. It had initially been announced that Facebook voting would be in effect for this series but due to technical issues during Big Brother 13, Channel 5 cancelled these plans. The public voted for who they wanted to save and they voted for their winner in the final two days.

=== House ===
The house remained largely unchanged from the thirteenth regular series. A separate room became the gym, the theme of the bedroom changed to a new maroon colour, with changed beds and a completely new carpet, the shower door was replaced and cameras were removed from the toilets, and new rugs were placed on the bathroom floor and the entrance to the garden. The sofas were also brand new to the Celebrity Big Brother House.

=== Twists ===
==== Live nominations ====
On Day 3, housemates nominated live on Channel 5, on the spin-off show Celebrity Big Brother: Live from the House. The nominations took place face-to-face in the living room, where Big Brother told housemates that they were required to nominate just one housemate to face the public vote. As a result of this, with three nominations each, Jasmine and Rhian were nominated for eviction and Jasmine was evicted six days later.

==== Jasmine's mother ====
Following the second live eviction, Big Brother's Bit on the Side host Emma Willis revealed that Jasmine's mother, Marilyn Galsworthy, would enter the house during the weekend, and would be controlled by Jasmine through an earpiece as part of a task. During the task, Marilyn posed as 'Shelley' a supposedly famous medium who had entered the house after causing controversy in the outside world. If the housemates sussed out that 'Shelley' was a fake, Jasmine and Marilyn would not receive their special prize - the chance to grant two housemates of their choice immunity from the impending nominations. As the housemates knew she was a fake, Jasmine and Marilyn lost the task and the nominations were carried out as normal.

== Ratings and reception ==
On 15 August 2012, the launch show drew 2.7 million viewers, and is down on the ninth series earlier in January which drew 3.5 million viewers. On 7 September 2012, the finale show drew 2.1 million viewers, and again is down on the ninth series by a million viewers.

=== Television ratings ===
Official ratings are taken from BARB.

	Official viewers (millions)			
	Week 1		Week 2	Week 3
Saturday		1.62	1.73	1.75
Sunday		2.06	1.86	2.15
Monday		2.22	2.28	2.09
Tuesday		2.37	2.44	2.18
Wednesday	2.83	2.42	2.18	1.96
Wednesday	1.79	1.44	1.54	2.18
Thursday	2	2.43	2.32	1.92
Friday	2	2.15	2.46	2.41
Friday	2.06	2.15	2.46	2.41
Weekly average	2.11		2.1	2.08
Running average	2.11		2.1	2.1
Series average	2.1			
