= I Wanna Be a Model season 2 =

I Wanna Be a Model
- Season 2
- No. of episodes: 13

Release
- Original network: 8TV

Season chronology
- ← Previous; Season 1 Next → Season 3

I Wanna Be a Model(我要做Model2) is a reality show hosted by Dylan Liong and Lynn Lim, which aims to find the next top fashion model in Malaysia.

The series featured a cast of 20 contestants (10 male models and 10 female models) will compete with each other to become the ultimate male and female supermodel. The participants will have to outshine each other on the catwalk fashion shows, photo shoots, self-make up and self-styling assignments and in video clip shoots.

Michael & Angie are the winners for this season, winning over Jit Shiong & Brandy.

== Summaries ==
=== Contestants ===
(In order of elimination)

- Ryan Yip Khay Hoong (23) & Jessie Chuah Shi Ping (22)
- Aaron Lee (18) & Tiffany Lim Guan Ping (20)
- Disney Choi (20) & Jojo Kwan Li Xian (18)
- Jimmie (19) & Chris Wai Shu Jun (23)
- Alan (21) & Janice Chen Yu Wei (22)
- Darric (21) & Kiwi Hsu Yi Wei (21)
- Kiyoshi Kwok (23) & Suzanne Looi Ai Zhu (23)
- Phirence Chen Ji Pin (24) & Joey Chin Yan Mei (19)
- Jit Shiong Yang Ri Xiong (23) & Brandy Chia Shi Zhi (20) (runners-up)
- Michael Wong Jun Jie (23) & Angie Seow Pei Ying (18) (winners)

=== Call out order ===
Female
Order	Episodes												
Order	1	2	3	4	5	6	7	8	9	10	11	12	13
1	Jojo	Tiffany	Angie	Suzanne	Brandy	Brandy	Angie	Angie	Joey	Suzanne	Angie	Angie	Angie
2	Janice	Jojo	Chris	Angie	Janice	Kiwi	Joey	Suzanne	Angie	Joey	Brandy	Brandy	Brandy
3	Brandy	Janice	Brandy	Kiwi	Suzanne	Suzanne	Brandy	Brandy	Brandy	Angie	Joey	Joey	
4	Angie	Brandy	Janice	Jojo	Angie	Janice	Kiwi	Kiwi	Suzanne	Brandy	Suzanne		
5	Tiffany	Chris	Joey	Janice	Joey	Joey	Suzanne	Joey	Kiwi	Kiwi			
6	Kiwi	Angie	Tiffany	Chris	Kiwi	Angie	Janice	Janice					
7	Chris	Kiwi	Suzanne	Joey	Chris	Chris	Chris						
8	Jessie	Jessie	Kiwi	Brandy	Jojo								
9	Suzanne	Joey	Jojo	Tiffany									
10	Joey	Suzanne	Jessie										

Male
Order	Episodes												
Order	1	2	3	4	5	6	7	8	9	10	11	12	13
1	Disney	Alan	Mike	Phirence	Phirence	Mike	Mike	Jit	Mike	Kiyoshi	Phirence	Mike	Mike
2	Phirence	Jit	Phirence	Jimmie	Alan	Jimmie	Jit	Mike	Jit	Jit	Jit	Jit	Jit
3	Jit	Phirence	Disney	Jit	Kiyoshi	Darric	Phirence	Kiyoshi	Darric	Mike	Mike	Phirence	
4	Mike	Disney	Darric	Alan	Mike	Jit	Kiyoshi	Phirence	Phirence	Phirence	Kiyoshi		
5	Ryan	Aaron	Kiyoshi	Kiyoshi	Jimmie	Phirence	Darric	Darric	Kiyoshi	Darric			
6	Aaron	Kiyoshi	Jimmie	Disney	Darric	Kiyoshi	Alan	Alan					
7	Kiyoshi	Mike	Alan	Darric	Jit	Alan	Jimmie						
8	Darric	Jimmie	Aaron	Mike	Disney								
9	Alan	Darric	Jit	Aaron									
10	Jimmie	Ryan	Ryan										

The contestant won the reward challenge.
The contestant was eliminated.
The contestant was part of a non-elimination bottom two
The contestant won the competition.
The runner-up contestant.

==== Photo shoot guide ====
- Week 02 Photo shoot: Own Style
- Week 03 Photo shoot: Promotional
- Week 04 Photo shoot: Denim Wear (Levi's Jeans)
- Week 05 Video: Fashion Show
- Week 06 Photo shoot: Back to School
- Week 07 Photo shoot: Postage Wrap
- Week 08 Photo shoot: Oriental
- Week 09 Photo shoot: British Rock
- Week 10 Photo shoot: SISTERS Magazine Cover Shoot
- Week 11 Photo shoot: Kleenex Ad; Water Floating
- Week 12 Photo shoot: Pet; Avant Garde
- Week 13 Photo shoot: Editorial shoot in Sentosa Island, Singapore

==== Judges ====
- Priscllia Yee: International Model
- Addy Lee: Hairstylist
- Christopher Liew: Fashion Photographer
