= To the North of Katmandu =

- Directed by: Terence Ryan
- Written by: Terence Ryan
- Produced by: Clifford Hadyn-Tovey
- Starring: Barbara Bach; Max Boyce; Billy Connolly; Ringo Starr
- Release date: 1986
- Country: United Kingdom
- Language: English

To the North of Katmandu is a 1986 comedy film directed by Terence Ryan and starring Barbara Bach, Max Boyce, Billy Connolly and Ringo Starr. It was filmed in Kathmandu, Nepal.

The title references a line from the poem The Green Eye of the Yellow God.

== Premise ==
Max Boyce takes part in the 1985 World Elephant Polo Championships in Kathmandu.

== Cast ==
- Max Boyce
- Barbara Bach
- Billy Connolly
- Ringo Starr
