= Karl Stromberg =

Fictional James Bond villain

- James Bond character
- First appearance: The Spy Who Loved Me (1977 film)
- Last appearance: James Bond: Top Agent (2008 video game)
- Created by: Christopher Wood
- Portrayed by: Curd Jürgens

In-universe information
- Gender: Male
- Affiliation: Self-employed; Stromberg Shipping
- Classification: Villain
- Henchmen: Jaws; Liparus Captain; Naomi; Sandor; Kate Chapman; Dr. Bechmann; Professor Markovitz

Karl Sigmund Stromberg is a fictional character and the main antagonist in the 1977 James Bond film The Spy Who Loved Me. Stromberg was portrayed by Curd Jürgens. The character Stromberg was created specifically for the film by writer Christopher Wood. Ian Fleming's novel The Spy Who Loved Me is told from the perspective of a young woman named Vivienne Michel who falls in love with James Bond and its plot is completely different from the film. When Fleming sold the novel's rights to Eon Productions, he stipulated that only the title be used.

== Biography ==
In the film The Spy Who Loved Me, the webbed-fingered Karl Stromberg (Curd Jürgens) is a successful businessman as head of his own shipping firm and chain of laboratories. Stromberg's obsession and passion is the ocean and he lives in a base named Atlantis, off the coast of Sardinia, Italy, that can submerge itself underwater. The Stromberg shipping line includes a supertanker, Liparus, that serves as his headquarters away from Atlantis and has a small army of red-liveried soldiers. In Christopher Wood's novelisation of the film, James Bond, the Spy Who Loved Me, Stromberg is Swedish and his first name is "Sigmund".

=== Scheme ===
Although Stromberg has a passion for the ocean and its various species, he despises the human race, not unlike Jules Verne's Captain Nemo. Stromberg, however, has no interest in benefiting the world. He has a congenital condition in which his hands are webbed like those of aquatic birds or mammals. It is his personal mission to start over with a new civilisation underwater via complete anarchy against the "surface world". After contracting two scientists to create the technology to track nuclear submarines, Stromberg uses this technology to capture a Soviet nuclear submarine and a British submarine. Stromberg's specially-adapted supertanker, Liparus, tracks and approaches submarines then disables their electrical power remotely. The submarine is forced to surface whereupon the Liparus captures it in an internal bay.

His plan calls for the firing of nuclear missiles from these submarines at Moscow and New York City, thus framing each other's government and starting a nuclear war, which would wipe out every last human being on Earth. Among Stromberg's many minions were an assistant Kate Chapman (Marilyn Galsworthy) who betrayed him by trying to sell the plans for the submarine tracking system, and Professor Markovitz (Milo Sperber) and Dr. Bechmann (Cyril Shaps) who were to help him operate the tracking system after it was complete. He killed Chapman by feeding her to a shark, and killed Markovitz and Bechmann, having outlived their usefulness, by blowing up their helicopter. (In a comic relief after cancelling the payment to Markovitz and Bechmann, he has his secretary inform the two men's families that they have met with an accident and are "buried at sea".)

This scheme is similar to that of an earlier Bond film, You Only Live Twice, which posited stealing space capsules to start a war between the Soviets and the Americans. The idea of commandeering two nuclear missiles and attempting to fire them at two major cities likewise recalls the plot of Thunderball. The scheme in which the villain wishes to destroy mankind to create a new race or new civilisation was also used in Moonraker, the next film after The Spy Who Loved Me. The film Moonraker was also written by Christopher Wood and featured Jaws (Richard Kiel) as a henchman.

=== Prevention ===
Stromberg's scheme is foiled after James Bond (Roger Moore) is taken aboard the Liparus as a prisoner from a recently captured American submarine. With Bond's help, the crews from the submarines escape and take over the supertanker. With that under their control, Bond is able to remotely order the stolen submarines, now crewed by Stromberg's men, to fire their nuclear warheads at each other. Prior to this, however, Stromberg had abducted Bond's partner, the Russian agent Anya Amasova (Barbara Bach), and escaped to his base, Atlantis.

Bond pursues Stromberg, and after two failed attempts by Stromberg to kill him (including the use of an explosive harpoon which ran the length of a dinner table), Bond exercises his licence to kill by shooting Stromberg multiple times in the stomach and chest. Atlantis is later torpedoed and sunk, giving Stromberg a burial at sea.

=== Henchmen ===
- Jaws – survived
- Naomi (Caroline Munro) – blown up by Bond
- Sandor (Milton Reid) – thrown off the edge of a building by Bond
- Liparus Captain (Sydney Tafler) – fatally wounded by an explosion
- Professor Markovitz – blown up in helicopter explosion
- Dr. Bechmann – blown up in helicopter explosion
- Kate Chapman – eaten by shark
- Captain, Stromberg 1 (formerly Soviet submarine Potemkin) (George Roubicek) – nuked, along with his entire crew, by Stromberg 2
- Captain, Stromberg 2 (formerly British submarine HMS Ranger) (Yashar Adem) – nuked, along with his entire crew, by Stromberg 1
- Motorbike Henchman – blinded and sent off a cliff
- Three Men in Jaws' car – all disabled or killed in car crash
- A large unit of soldiers in red uniform -- defeated with many casualties

== See also ==
- List of James Bond villains
- James Bond in film
