= I Wanna Be a Model season 1 =

I Wanna Be a Model
- Season 1
- No. of episodes: 13

Release
- Original network: 8TV
- Original release: August 5 – October 28, 2006

Season chronology
- Next → Season 2

I Wanna Be a Model (我要做Model) is a reality show hosted by Dylan Liong and Lynn Lim, which aims to find the next top fashion model in Malaysia.

The series featured a cast of 20 contestants (10 male models and 10 female models) will compete with each other to become the ultimate male and female supermodel. The participants will have to outshine each other on the catwalk fashion shows, photo shoots, self-make up and self-styling assignments and in video clip shoots.

Among with the prize was: a one-year modeling contract with Andrews Models, a one-year membership with Celebrity Fitness, a brand new Proton Savvy, a gift from Revlon cosmetics, a brand new Swatch watches, and a brand new Motorola mobile phones.

The winners is Jack Koo, winning over Caster Wenorica Chong & Eloise Law & Ken Tan.

== Contestants ==
English Name	Name	Age	Height	Weight	Outcome	Place
Angelia	Sim Siew Lian	25	170.2 cm (5 ft 7 in)	49.5 kg (109 lb)	Episode 4	20-17
Boonwai	How Boon Wai	23	183 cm (6 ft 0 in)	74 kg (163 lb)	Episode 4	20-17
Daryll	Cha Chang Yen	26	180 cm (5 ft 11 in)	68 kg (150 lb)	Episode 4	20-17
Felicia	Zheng Yu Qin	20	174 cm (5 ft 8 1/2 in)	55 kg (121 lb)	Episode 4	20-17
Candy	Lim Ping Ping	19	163 cm (5 ft 4 in)	44.9 kg (99 lb)	Episode 5	16-15
Chris	Gan Yong Chia	22	180 cm (5 ft 11 in)	61.8 kg (136 lb)	Episode 5	16-15
Allien	Lim Choon Seng	19	183 cm (6 ft 0 in)	75 kg (165 lb)	Episode 7	14-13
Sammi	Zhang Pei Jing	18	160 cm (5 ft 3 in)	42.9 kg (94 lb)	Episode 7	14-13
Hero	Tai Choo Xiong	19	176 cm (5 ft 9 1/2 in)	74.5 kg (164 lb)	Episode 9	12-11
Meifen	Lim Mei Fen	19	168 cm (5 ft 6 in)	50 kg (110 lb)	Episode 9	12-11
Danny	Foo Kim Chen	25	179.5 cm (5 ft 10 1/2 in)	71.3 kg (157 lb)	Episode 10	10-9
Shuhyih	How Shuh Yih	26	171 cm (5 ft 7 1/2 in)	50.6 kg (111 lb)	Episode 10	10-9
Paris	Paris Ais Philips	19	172 cm (5 ft 7 1/2 in)	40.6 kg (89 lb)	Episode 11	8 (Quit)
Jason	Lee Yit Zheng	20	182 cm (5 ft 11 1/2 in)	76 kg (167 lb)	Episode 11	7
Kevin	Soo Ker Way	22	176 cm (5 ft 9 1/2 in)	62 kg (136 lb)	Episode 12	6-5
Vivian	Chong Lih Jia	21	165 cm (5 ft 5 in)	49.9 kg (110 lb)	Episode 12	6-5
Caster Wenorica	Chong Yan Qion	18	169 cm (5 ft 6 1/2 in)	61.2 kg (135 lb)	Episode 13	4-2
Eloise	Law Lee Lee	22	170 cm (5 ft 7 in)	51.6 kg (114 lb)	Episode 13	4-2
Ken	Tan Chia Kean	20	181 cm (5 ft 11 1/2 in)	75.2 kg (165 lb)	Episode 13	4-2
Jack	Koo Chen Jye	22	187.5 cm (6 ft 2 in)	80.6 kg (177 lb)	Episode 13	1

=== Judges ===
- Steve Yap
- Jasmine Koh
- Christopher Low

== Elimination chart ==
Place	Model	Episodes									
Place	Model	4	5	6	7	8	9	10	11	12	13
1	Jack	SAFE	SAFE	SAFE	SAFE	SAFE	SAFE	SAFE	LOW	SAFE	WINNER
2-4	Caster	SAFE	SAFE	SAFE	SAFE	SAFE	SAFE	SAFE	SAFE	SAFE	OUT
2-4	Eloise	SAFE	SAFE	SAFE	SAFE	SAFE	SAFE	SAFE	SAFE	SAFE	OUT
2-4	Ken	SAFE	SAFE	SAFE	SAFE	SAFE	SAFE	SAFE	LOW	SAFE	OUT
6-5	Kevin	SAFE	SAFE	SAFE	SAFE	LOW	SAFE	SAFE	LOW	OUT	
6-5	Vivian	SAFE	SAFE	SAFE	SAFE	LOW	SAFE	SAFE	SAFE	OUT	
7	Jason	SAFE	SAFE	SAFE	SAFE	SAFE	LOW	SAFE	OUT		
8	Paris	SAFE	SAFE	SAFE	SAFE	SAFE	LOW	SAFE	QUIT		
10-9	Danny	SAFE	SAFE	SAFE	SAFE	SAFE	SAFE	OUT			
10-9	Shuhyih	SAFE	SAFE	SAFE	SAFE	SAFE	SAFE	OUT			
11-12	Hero	SAFE	SAFE	SAFE	SAFE	LOW	OUT				
11-12	Meifen	SAFE	SAFE	SAFE	SAFE	LOW	OUT				
13-14	Allien	SAFE	SAFE	SAFE	OUT						
13-14	Sammi	SAFE	SAFE	SAFE	OUT						
15-16	Candy	SAFE	OUT								
15-16	Chris	SAFE	OUT								
17-20	Angelia	OUT									
17-20	Boonwai	OUT									
17-20	Daryll	OUT									
17-20	Felicia	OUT									

- Note: Contestant who wins the challenge receives extra five frames for the week's photo shoot.

Male Contestant
Female Contestant
Green background with the word WINNER means the contestant won the competition
Orange background with the word LOW means the contestant was part of the bottom
Red background with the word OUT means the contestant was eliminated from the competition

=== Photo Shoot Guide ===
- Episode 1 Photo shoot: Promotional
- Episode 2 Photo shoot: Promotional
- Episode 3 Photo shoot: Nude look
- Episode 4 Photo shoot: Mirror
- Episode 5 Photo shoot: Hip hop
- Episode 6 Photo shoot: Runway
- Episode 7 Photo shoot: Funky
- Episode 8 Photo shoot: Horoscope
- Episode 9 Photo shoot: Wild animal
- Episode 10 Photo shoot: High Fashion
- Episode 11 Photo shoot: My Wedding
- Episode 12 Photo shoot: TV Commercial for Proton Savvy
