= Raisyyah Rania Yeap =

Malaysian model and former Playboy Bunny

- 叶静仪
- Born: Felixia Yeap Chin Yee; 3 July 1986 (age 40); Kuala Lumpur, Malaysia
- Other name: Felixia Yeap
- Citizenship: Malaysian
- Spouse: Rezal Khairi Ahmad (m. 2015)
- Modeling information
- Height: 1.73 m (5 ft 8 in)
- Hair color: Black
- Eye color: Dark brown
- Agency: Velocity Angels

Chinese name
- Traditional Chinese: 葉靜儀
- Simplified Chinese: 叶静仪
- Hanyu Pinyin: Yè Jìngyí
- Pha̍k-fa-sṳ: Ya̍p Chhin-ngì
- Jyutping: Jip6 Zing6 Ji4
- Hokkien POJ: Tiuⁿ Pi̍t-sū

Raisyyah Rania Yeap (simplified Chinese: 叶静仪; traditional Chinese: 葉靜儀; pinyin: Yè Jìngyí; Jyutping: Jip6 Zing6 Ji4; Pe̍h-ōe-jī: Tiuⁿ Pi̍t-sū; Pha̍k-fa-sṳ: Ya̍p Chhin-ngì; Xiao'erjing: اِئ دٍ ىِ; born Felixia Yeap Chin Yee; 3 July 1986), formerly Felixia Yeap, is a Malaysian model. She was Malaysia's first and only Playboy Bunny. Since December 2013, she has sported a hijab, sparking controversy among the country's Muslim and non-Muslim communities. On 3 July 2014, she said she had converted to Islam.

== Biography ==
Felixia was born in Kuala Lumpur and raised in Ipoh, Perak, West Malaysia. Prior to her modelling career, she worked as a kindergarten teacher. Yeap started her modelling career in 2005 after becoming one of the finalists of the Dewi Remaja contest.

She appeared on the third season of I Wanna Be a Model as a finalist and listed in the Hall of Fame for Miss Malaysia Tourism 2007 at the age of 19. She was also the 1st runner-up for Miss Chinese World Malaysia 2006 and a finalist for Dewi Remaja Malaysia.

In 2008, Yeap was chosen to represent Malaysia in the 2008 Beijing Olympic - Olympics Beauty and followed up as the finalist for FHM Girl Next Door 2009 and was crowned Velocity Angels-Model of The Year 2009 before being a finalist for Miss Universe Malaysia 2010. Yeap had quit from the Miss Malaysia World 2009 beauty pageant earlier as she disagreed with the terms and conditions of the competition. She was seen hosting the AQUARIUS Fashion Show in conjunction with WWF Malaysia along with Sam Insanity and is rumoured to be going out with him.

Yeap was chosen to be among Playboy Macau's first batch of Bunnies. She posed in a non-nude pictorial in the July–August 2013 issue of Playboy Philippines. Yeap's career at the Playboy Macau club lasted only a month.

== Conversion to Islam ==
In December 2013, Yeap started donning a hijab. She explained in her blog: "I believe I am worth more than just showing off my body. I am more than this. And I don't feel proud if attention- or fame-seeking model wannabes out there look at me as their idol or role model." Yeap officially converted to Islam on 3 July 2014, and changed her name to Raisyyah Rania Yeap.
