= Backs to the Land =

- Genre: Sitcom
- Starring: Philippa Howell; Terese Stevens; Marilyn Galsworthy; Pippa Page; John Stratton; Della Paton
- Country of origin: United Kingdom
- Original language: English
- No. of series: 3
- No. of episodes: 19

Production
- Running time: 30 minutes
- Production company: Anglia Television

Original release
- Network: ITV
- Release: 15 April 1977 – 1 September 1978

Backs to the Land is a British sitcom that aired on ITV from 15 April 1977 to 1 September 1978. Starring Philippa Howell, Terese Stevens and Marilyn Galsworthy, Backs to the Land is set during World War II. It was written by David Climie and the theme song was sung by World War II sweetheart Anne Shelton. It was made for the ITV network by Anglia Television.

== Cast ==
- Philippa Howell - Shirley Bloom
- Terese Stevens - Jenny Dabb
- Marilyn Galsworthy - Daphne Finch-Beauchamp (first 7 episodes)
- John Stratton - Tom Whitlow
- Della Paton - Ethel Whitlow
- David Troughton - Roy Whitlow (series 1)
- Michael Troughton - Eric Whitlow (series 1)
- Alison Leggatt - Lady Bramston (series 1)
- Arthur Lovegrove - Tilford (series 1)
- Jeremy Child - Captain Truscott (series 2)
- Pippa Page - Bunny Burroughs (from series 2)
- Stephanie Fayerman - Aggie
- Charles Lamb - Wally
- Geraldine Newman - Miss Rainbow
- Peter Tuddenham - Landlord

== Plot ==
Backs to the Land starts in 1940 with three young women who are in the Women's Land Army, going to work in a farm to replace the men who have gone to war. The three women are Daphne, Cockney Jenny, and Jewish, down-to-earth Shirley. They end up at Crabtree Farm in Clayfield, Norfolk. The owner is Tom Whitlow, and his sons are Roy and Eric.

== Episodes ==
=== Series One (1977) ===
1. "A Miss Is As Good As A Male" (15 April 1977)
2. "Nymphs & Shepherds Come Expensive" (22 April 1977)
3. "Alarms, Excursions and Day Trips" (29 April 1977)
4. "Sons and Lovers, God Forbid" (6 May 1977)
5. "We Shall Fight Them in the Breeches" (13 May 1977)
6. "All Is Somehow Gathered In" (20 May 1977)

=== Series Two (1977–78) ===
1. "Enter Flirting" (2 December 1977)
2. "All Mod. Con-Tricks" (9 December 1977)
3. "Nickers in the Woodpile" (16 December 1977)
4. "The Warsaw Overture" (23 December 1977)
5. "The Magnetic Pole" (30 December 1977)
6. "New Broomsticks" (6 January 1978)

=== Series Three (1978) ===
1. "Rainbow Around My Neck" (21 July 1978)
2. "Remains to be Seen" (28 July 1978)
3. "Let's Talk Turkey" (4 August 1978)
4. "Waits and Desperate Measures" (11 August 1978)
5. "Don't Call Us, We'll Call You" (18 August 1978)
6. "A Day Dog and Doris" (25 August 1978)
7. "Right Royal" (1 September 1978)

== DVD release ==
All three series of Backs to the Land have been released on 28 June 2010 and on 6 February and 9 April 2012. A 3-disc set of the complete series is scheduled to follow at some point.

DVD	Release date
The Complete Series 1	28 June 2010
The Complete Series 2	6 February 2012
The Complete Series 3	9 April 2012
The Complete Series 1 to 3 Box Set	TBA
