= I Wanna Be a Model season 3 =

I Wanna Be a Model
- Season 3
- No. of episodes: 13

Release
- Original network: 8TV

Season chronology
- ← Previous; Season 2 Next → Season 4

I Wanna Be a Model (我要做Model3) is a Malaysian TV show that featured a cast of 16 contestants (eight male models and eight female models) who competed with each other to become the ultimate male and female supermodel. The participants had to outshine each other on the catwalk fashion shows, photo shoots, self-make-up and self-styling assignments and in video clip shoots.

Among with the prize was: a one-year modeling contract with Cilla & Associates Management, appeared on the magazine cover of Citta Bella, a one-year membership with Celebrity Fitness, a gift from Sasa cosmetics worth RM10,000, a brand new Sony Ericsson C903 mobile phones, a voucher from Lewré worth RM1,000, and a cash prize of RM10,000.

The winners of this season was Sam Ong and Shir Chong.

== Contestants ==
In order of elimination

English Name	Name	Age	Height	Hometown	Outcome	Place
Elden	Lim Ca Hee	23	178 cm (5 ft 10 in)	Johor	Episode 3	16-15
Kelly	Ku Shia Ting	25	167 cm (5 ft 5 1/2 in)	Kuala Lumpur	Episode 3	16-15
Jenny	Foh Jie Ni	20	170 cm (5 ft 7 in)	Cameron Highlands	Episode 4	14
George	Chon Jin Yen	25	181 cm (5 ft 11 1/2 in)	Kuala Lumpur	Episode 5	13
Jason	Jason Nicholas Teo	22	175 cm (5 ft 9 in)	Johor	Episode 7	12-11
Liz	Chong Chee Ting	21	170 cm (5 ft 7 in)	Johor	Episode 7	12-11
Cynthia	Ng Hooi Theng	24	169 cm (5 ft 6 1/2 in)	Kuala Lumpur	Episode 8	10-9
Jovean	Yee Chiun Hsiang	24	180 cm (5 ft 11 in)	Perak	Episode 8	10-9
Felixia	Yeap Chin Yee	23	173 cm (5 ft 8 in)	Kuala Lumpur	Episode 10	8-7
Leconte	Lee Wei Hon	19	180 cm (5 ft 11 in)	Kuala Lumpur	Episode 10	8-7
Alice	Tan Siew Sheue	24	170 cm (5 ft 7 in)	Johor	Episode 12	6-5
Feddrick	Teh Chee Leong	19	181 cm (5 ft 11 1/2 in)	Penang	Episode 12	6-5
Alvin	Lim Chon Yun	21	188 cm (6 ft 2 in)	Johor	Episode 13	4-3
Stephanie	Tan Soo Chiaw	21	168 cm (5 ft 6 in)	Penang	Episode 13	4-3
Sam	Ong Chia Shing	22	187 cm (6 ft 1 1/2 in)	Penang	Episode 13	2-1
Shir	Chong Jia Wen	21	174 cm (5 ft 8 1/2 in)	Sabah	Episode 13	2-1

== Episode guide ==
=== Episode 1: Auditions ===
Original air date: July 7, 2009

The episode showcases the auditions in Kuala Lumpur, and the 16 finalists are selected.

=== Episode 2: Promotional Shoot ===
Original air date: July 14, 2009

The models have modeling 101 workshops and later have their promotional photo shoot. Lastly, the models have a challenge that will determine who will be eliminated for the first week. Feddrick and Liz win "best picture of the week". Elden, Jason, Cynthia and Kelly land in the bottom four. It is announced that Jason and Cynthia will be leaving home, but since it is the first week, they were given another chance.

- Best Picture of The Week: Feddrick and Liz
- Bottom-four: Elden, Jason, Cynthia, Kelly
- Eliminated: None

=== Episode 3: Beauty Shot ===
Original Airdate: July 21, 2009

The models have a make-up challenge in Sasa. Alvin & Alice won the make up challenge, receiving themselves extra 5 frames for the photo shoot. Each group of two models were given themes for their photo shoot.

Models	Theme
Sam & Jenny	Lollipop
Leconte	Body Scrub
Cynthia	Flowers
Jason & Stephanie	Foam
George & Felixia	Makeup base
Feddrick & Kelly	Foundation
Alvin & Liz	Sunblock
Jovean & Shir	Eyeliner
Elden & Alice	Facial mask

- Challenge winners: Alvin & Alice
- Best Picture of The Week: Feddrick & Shir
- Bottom-four: Elden, George, Kelly, Jenny
- Eliminated: Elden & Kelly

=== Episode 4: Avant-Garde ===
Original Airdate: July 28, 2009

The models had a hair styling challenge. Jason and Shir received Wella hair product.

- Challenge winners: Jason and Shir
- Best Picture of The Week: Sam
- Bottom-three: Alvin, Liz, Jenny
- Eliminated: Jenny

=== Episode 5: Styling on the road ===
Original Airdate: August 2, 2009

The contestants had a 10 seconds speech challenge with 988. Jovean won the challenge. The contestants have their photo shoot in Putrajaya with a surreal theme.

- Challenge winner: Jovean
- Best Picture of The Week: Felixia
- Bottom three: Cynthia, Alvin, George
- Eliminated: George

=== Episode 6: Wedding Shoot ===
Original Airdate: August 9, 2009

The models were transported to a village to do some charity work including giving away them food and drinks to the poor.

The models were paired up for this week's photo shoot as couples posing for their wedding photos at Palace Beach & Spa. The groups are Feddrick & Stephanie, Jovean & Shir, Alvin & Liz, Jason & Alice, Leconte & Felixia, Sam & Cynthia. During panel, after judging and deliberating, Leconte was announced as the winner of the challenge. Alvin, Liz, Jason and Alice were announced as the bottom four. Alvin and Liz were saved to the next round. However, Jason and Alice was supposed to be eliminated, but they were spared.

- Challenge winner: Leconte
- Best Picture of The Week: None
- Bottom four: Alvin, Liz, Jason, Alice
- Eliminated: None

=== Episode 7: Superstar ===
Original Airdate: August 16, 2009

The models paired up male and female have to 'buy' their personal style in The Mines shopping mall. Feddrick and Stephanie won the challenge.

This week's photo shoot the models have to posed as if they're superstar.

- Challenge winner: Feddrick & Stephanie
- Best Picture of The Week: Jovean, Shir, Alvin, Alice
- Bottom-four: Leconte, Cynthia, Jason, Liz
- Eliminated: Jason & Liz

=== Episode 8: Puppets ===
Original Airdate: August 23, 2009

The models had a go-see challenge, Alvin and Shir won the challenge. This week's photo shoot is portraying a puppet being neglected wearing clothes by Alexandrea Yeo of Project Runway Malaysia. During panel, the judges said that all the male models are slowly slipping away, and warned them they better step up their game.

- Challenge winner: Alvin & Shir
- Best Picture of The Week: Stephanie
- Bottom-two: Jovean & Cynthia
- Eliminated: Jovean & Cynthia

=== Episode 9: P. Ramlee ===
Original Airdate: August 30, 2009

The models meet 4 Malaysian models- Tengku Azura, Joseph Chow, Carla Soong and Peter Davis and taught them more about the modeling industry. The photo shoot, models need to portray characteristic from the 1950/60s, the male models are to be macho and the female are to be soft-spoken. Later, they were to do a couple shot with a story line as well together with the host Jefferey and Cheryl.

Models	Story line
Sam & Stephanie	Triangle Love (with Cheryl)
Leconte & Alice	The rich and the peasant (with Jeffrey)
Alvin & Felixia	Caught in the act (with Jeffrey)
Feddrick & Shir	Sisters snatching younger boyfriend (with Cheryl)

- Challenge winner: None
- Best Picture of The Week: Alvin & Shir
- Bottom-two: Feddrick & Alice
- Eliminated: None

=== Episode 10: Magazine Cover shoot ===
Original Airdate: September 6, 2009

The models had a body combat work out at Celebrity Fitness. The models posed with International Supermodel Ana R for Citta Bella Magazine Cover.

- Challenge winner: None
- Best Picture of The Week: Sam & Stephanie
- Bottom-four: Alice, Felixia, Feddrick, Leconte
- Eliminated: Leconte, Felixia

=== Episode 11: Funeral ===
Original Airdate: September 13, 2009

The models posed with reptiles and bull in the Sunway Lagoon Wildlife, Alice and Alvin struggles while posing with a snake. The photo shoot took place in the cemetery.

- Challenge winner: None
- Best Picture of The Week: Alice
- Bottom: None
- Eliminated: None

=== Episode 12: Recycle ===
Original Airdate: September 20, 2009

The models have a go-see to 4 different locations- Studio Rom, Citta Bella, Cilla & Associates and Salabianca, Philosophy, Grafitee. The models have their photo shoot at a rubbish dump site with a recycle theme, all their outfits and accessories are recyclable materials. The go-see challenge winners were announced at panel.

- Challenge winner: Feddrick & Shir
- Best Picture of The Week: Sam & Stephanie
- Bottom: None
- Eliminated: Feddrick & Alice
- Top-4: Alvin, Sam, Stephanie, Shir

=== Episode 13: Grand Finals ===
Original Airdate: September 27, 2009

The finale showcased the top-4 catwalk wearing various top Malaysian designers' design. their photo shoots with past-winners, an autumn theme photo shoot and an ad for Sony Ericsson. The show closes with Malaysian band- Friendz performing a few of their singles; "Hug", "Gemuruh" and "Gimme 5".

Models	Past-winners
Alvin	Michael (Season 2 male champion)
Sam	Jack (Season 1 male champion)
Shir	Eloise (Season 1 female champion)
Stephanie	Angie (Season 2 female champion)

- Winners: Sam & Shir
- Runners-up: Alvin & Stephanie

== Summaries ==
=== Elimination chart ===
Place	Model	Episodes											
Place	Model	2	3	4	5	6	7	8	9	10	11	12	13
1	Sam	SAFE	SAFE	WIN	SAFE	SAFE	SAFE	SAFE	SAFE	WIN	SAFE	WIN	WINNER
1	Shir	SAFE	WIN	SAFE	SAFE	SAFE	WIN	SAFE	WIN	SAFE	SAFE	SAFE	WINNER
2	Alvin	SAFE	SAFE	LOW	LOW	LOW	SAFE	SAFE	WIN	SAFE	SAFE	SAFE	OUT
2	Stephanie	SAFE	SAFE	SAFE	SAFE	SAFE	SAFE	WIN	SAFE	WIN	SAFE	WIN	OUT
3	Feddrick	WIN	WIN	SAFE	SAFE	SAFE	SAFE	SAFE	SPD	LOW	SAFE	OUT	
3	Alice	SAFE	SAFE	SAFE	SAFE	SPD	SAFE	SAFE	SPD	LOW	WIN	OUT	
4	Leconte	SAFE	SAFE	SAFE	SAFE	SAFE	LOW	SAFE	SAFE	OUT			
4	Felixia	SAFE	SAFE	SAFE	WIN	SAFE	SAFE	SAFE	SAFE	OUT			
5	Jovean	SAFE	SAFE	SAFE	SAFE	SAFE	WIN	OUT					
5	Cynthia	SPD	SAFE	SAFE	LOW	SAFE	LOW	OUT					
6	Jason	SPD	SAFE	SAFE	SAFE	SPD	OUT						
6	Liz	WIN	SAFE	LOW	SAFE	LOW	OUT						
7	George	SAFE	LOW	SAFE	OUT								
7	Jenny	SAFE	LOW	OUT									
8	Elden	LOW	OUT										
8	Kelly	LOW	OUT										

- Note: Contestant who wins the challenge receives extra five frames for the week's photo shoot.

Male Contestant
Female Contestant
Green background with the word WINNER means the contestant won the competition
Green background with the word WIN means the contestant won "Best Picture of The Week"
Orange background with the word LOW means the contestant was part of the bottom
Red background with the word OUT means the contestant was eliminated from the competition
Black background with the SPD means the contestant was spared from elimination

=== Photo-shoot guide ===
- Episode 2 Photo shoot: Promotional shoot
- Episode 3 Photo shoot: Beauty shot
- Episode 4 Photo shoot: Avant-garde
- Episode 5 Photo shoot: Styling on the road
- Episode 6 Photo shoot: Wedding shoot
- Episode 7 Photo shoot: Superstar
- Episode 8 Photo shoot: Puppets
- Episode 9 Photo shoot: P. Ramlee
- Episode 10 Photo shoot: Magazine cover shoot
- Episode 11 Photo shoot: Funeral
- Episode 12 Photo shoot: Recycle
- Episode 13 Photo shoot: Posing with past-winners; Yugo Tham Fall Collection; Sony Ericsson

=== Hosts ===
- Jefferey Cheng
- Cheryl Lee

=== Judges ===
- Priscllia Yee: International model
- Addy Lee: Hairstylist
- Christopher Low: Fashion photographer
