= Jasmine Lennard =

British model

- Born: 26 July 1985 (age 41); Westminster, United Kingdom
- Occupations: Model; actress
- Children: 2
- Modelling information
- Height: 5 ft 8 in (1.73 m)
- Hair colour: Brown-Black
- Eye colour: Brown

Jasmine Lennard (born 26 July 1985) is a British model, actress, TV host and reality television star from Westminster, best known for modelling for Scott Henshall, Gossard underwear and Dolce&Gabbana.

She first came to public attention when appearing as a contestant on Make Me a Supermodel before appearing on Celebrity Big Brother 10 .

== Early life ==
Born in Westminster, Lennard is the socialite daughter of Brian Lennard, who founded Sacha Shoes, and Bond actress Marilyn Galsworthy. Lennard has two sisters, Pandora (b. 1988) and Jessica (b. 1983).

== Career ==
Lennard came to the public's attention in 2005 as a finalist in the reality TV talent search Make Me a Supermodel. She angered judge Rachel Hunter by saying "I suggest she throws out the truckload of make-up she uses and hires a personal trainer." and talked about her lesbian affairs while filming the show.

She later pursued her acting career with a role starring alongside Ray Liotta and Jason Statham in Guy Ritchie's 2005 film Revolver.

In 2006, Lennard appeared as a contestant on a celebrity edition of The Weakest Link, and as a talking head on various celebrity-based documentaries. Later in the same year she was made presenter of Five Life spin-off show Make Me A Supermodel Extra.

== Personal life ==
Lennard has dated a number of high-profile men including Simon Cowell, rock musician Dave Navarro and footballer Cristiano Ronaldo.

In 2007, Lennard moved to Los Angeles. In 2010, she gave birth at the Chelsea and Westminster Hospital in London to a son with Crazy Town front man and founder Shifty Shellshock, Phoenix.

In 2019 Lennard became engaged to Saudi billionaire businessman Mohammed Al Saif.

In 2021 Lennard gave birth to daughter Vida Al Saif.
