= Alice Sinclair =

British model

- Born: November 17, 1987 (age 39); Pinner, London, England
- Education: Henrietta Barnett School
- Occupation: Model
- Modeling information
- Height: 6 ft 0 in (1.83 m)

Alice Sinclair (born 17 November 1987) is an English fashion model best known for winning the reality TV program Make Me a Supermodel screened on Five.

Her "quirky personality" and odd looks saw her beat twelve other finalists to victory in the live catwalk finale, April 2005.

Sinclair decided to shake off all association with the program and prove herself in the fashion world. She enjoyed success, modelling across the world for magazines including Vogue Italia, Glamour, Marie Claire and Cosmopolitan, and appearing in print and TV ads for Levi's, H&M, Nokia, Fred Perry and Fabris Lane.

Annoyed by the negative stereotypes forced on models, she remarked, "There are millions of beautiful women out there and that isn't enough to succeed," and decided to leave modelling after two years to continue the studies she had put on hold.

She was educated in England at the all-girls' Henrietta Barnett School.
