= Brian Lennard =

British businessman and gambler (1935–2019)

Brian Douglas Lennard (18 June 1935 – 27 June 2019) founded Sacha Shoes – a chain of 200 shoe shops in the UK. He gambled away much of his fortune and was an early member of Gamblers Anonymous which he helped to establish in the UK. He was married to actress Marilyn Galsworthy, who divorced him after finding out he lost most of their fortune. Lennard had three daughters with Galsworthy, Jasmine Lennard, Pandora and Jessica.
