= Marilyn Galsworthy =

British actress (born 1954)

Marilyn Galsworthy (born 1954) is a British actress, who acted for 15 years in the Royal Shakespeare Company, appearing opposite Patrick Stewart and Alfred Molina. She also had a number of television and film roles including a small one in the James Bond film The Spy Who Loved Me as the secretary/assistant to the villain Karl Stromberg. In the film, Stromberg requests her to leave the dining room where he shuts off the lift, which has a hidden trap door where a section of the lift shaft extends into his aquarium containing a captive shark to which she is fed.

On television, Galsworthy appeared in the first seven episodes of sitcom Backs to the Land. She also made a guest appearance in the tenth series of Celebrity Big Brother 10, and made a guest star appearance in The Professionals episode "The Untouchables" as Anna, a high class call girl who helps Bodie and Doyle set up Rahad (played by guest actor Keith Washington).

Galsworthy is the mother of Jasmine Lennard, and was married to Brian Lennard.

== Filmography ==
- 1977: The Spy Who Loved Me - Stromberg's Assistant
