= Samantha Brick =

British journalist

- Born: 10 February 1971 (age 55); Kings Heath, Birmingham, England
- Occupation: Journalist
- Spouse: Pascal Rubinat
- Children: Antonio (stepson)

Samantha Brick (born 10 February 1971) is a British television producer, writer, and freelance journalist.

== Life and career ==
Brick was born in the Birmingham suburb of Kings Heath. Her parents were both Catholic and worked in mental health.

Brick worked for LWT where she produced or directed shows including Ibiza Uncovered, Dinner Dates and Baby School.

Brick was a producer of entertainment and factual at BSkyB working on shows including Temptation Island, Vegas Uncovered, The Villa and Single Girls. She then moved to September Films as head of programming in January 2002, later moving to the company's Los Angeles office to become executive vice president of programming and development.

In October 2005, Brick launched her own independent production company, Sam Brick Entertainment, which produced shows including Chubby Children for LivingTV. In March 2006, the Daily Mirror reported that Sarah, Duchess of York had signed an exclusive deal with Sam Brick Entertainment to host a reality TV diet show. Brick's production company collapsed later that year.

On 3 April 2012, the Daily Mail published an article by Brick titled "Why do women hate me for being beautiful?". The article became an internet phenomenon, leading to Brick's thoughts becoming an internet meme. This led to Brick appearing on a number of TV shows including ITV's This Morning and the RTÉ chat show The Late Late Show. Later in the year Brick was a contestant on Celebrity Big Brother 10. On 31 August 2012, she became the fourth person to be evicted from the Big Brother house.

In 2013 Brick published a book, Head Over Heels in France, in which she wrote about the collapse of her production company.

== Personal life ==
At the age of 30, Brick's first marriage was to Damon Pettit. Brick is now married to a French man, Pascal Rubinat.
