= Make Me a Supermodel (British TV series) =

- Genre: Fashion
- Presented by: Dave Berry & Tess Daly (2005: Live Final only); Fearne Cotton (2006: Live Shows)
- Judges: Tandy Anderson; Rachel Hunter; Perou; Dylan Jones (2006)
- Country of origin: United Kingdom
- Original language: English
- No. of series: 2
- No. of episodes: 32

Production
- Running time: Varies
- Production company: Tiger Aspect Productions

Original release
- Network: Channel 5
- Release: 14 March 2005 – 16 November 2006

Related
- Make Me a Supermodel (American TV series); Make Me a Supermodel (Australian TV series)

Make Me a Supermodel is a British reality television modeling competition hosted and judged by New Zealand model Rachel Hunter, airing on the television channel Five. An American version began airing 2 January 2008 on the cable network Bravo.

== Series overview ==
Series	Premiere date	Winner	Runner-up	Other contestants in order of elimination	Number of contestants	Destination(s)
1	March 14, 2005	Alice Sinclair	Kate Ellery	Katie Black, Juliet Horne, Jackie Turner, Patsy Kigozi, Camilla Hamilton, Jasmine Lennard, Abigail Boston & Emily Mann, Antoinette Williams, Samantha Rowley, Joanna Downes	13	(France); Paris (United States); New York City
2	October 15, 2006	Albert Mordue	Luke Farrell	Jono Namara & Katie Furler, James Dunstan & Kerrie Johnson, Anya James & Josh Murad, Sennait Adhanom & Waz Ashayer, Marianne Berglund, Jen Hunter	12	(Iceland); Reykjavík

== Series one (2005) ==
The series premiered Tuesday, 14 March 2005 and followed 13 young women (including twins) competing for a modelling contract with Select Model Management and a trip to Maldives to shooting for Glamour magazine. The judges of the first season were Rachel Hunter, Tandy Anderson (co-founder and owner of Select) and fashion photographer Perou. This season contained 13 episodes.

The judges eliminated 10 contestants, with viewers voting for the winner among the final three – Kate Ellery, Alice Sinclair and Joanna Downes – in a live catwalk show presented by Tess Daly and Dave Berry. Sinclair was the first season's winner.

=== Contestants ===
(Ages stated are at start of contest)

Contestant	Age	Hometown	Finish	Place
Katie Black	21	Paisley	Episode 1	13
Juliet Horne	21	London	Episode 1	12
Jackie Turner	26	Dorset	Episode 2	11
Patsy Kigozi^{1}	19	London	Episode 3	10
Camilla Hamilton	19	London	Episode 5	9
Jasmine Lennard	19	Fulham	Episode 6	8
Abigail Boston	18	Congleton	Episode 7	7-6
Emily Mann	21	London	Episode 7	7-6
Antoinette Williams^{1}	19	London	Episode 9	5
Samantha Rowley	17	Kent	Episode 10	4
Joanna Downes	22	Hertfordshire	Episode 12	3
Kate Ellery	18	Cardiff	Episode 12	2
Alice Sinclair	18	Middlesex	Episode 12	1

^1 Antoinette Williams and Patsy Kigozi are identical twins; however, they competed individually.

== Series two (2006) ==
The second series premiered on Sunday, 15 October 2006 with a change in format from the first series: this time, male models were part of the competition. This season contained 19 episodes and followed 12 young competing for a modelling contract with Select Model Management and a spread in either Glamour for girls or GQ Magazine for boys. In addition, the three returning judges were joined by new judge Dylan Jones, editor-in-chief of British GQ magazine. Each week, one male contestant and one female contestant would be eliminated, until the final catwalk, at which a winner was chosen. With the exception of the first elimination, it was all based on the public's votes. The live catwalk shows were presented by Fearne Cotton on Fridays.

Each week, the bottom four contestants (two male models, two female models) would face a live 'Walk Off', and the public would vote and the male and female model who received the lowest vote total from the public would be eliminated. In the first week, there was no 'Walk Off' - the judges decided which two of the models were the weakest and should be sent home.

The final show aired on Thursday 16 November 2006. Four models competed: Albert, Jen, Luke, Marianne. As in every catwalk show in Make me a Supermodel, the models had to do 3 catwalks. After the first 'Walk Off', Marianne was eliminated. The remaining 3 models walked the next 'Walk Off' and Jen was eliminated, leaving the 2 men, Luke and Albert. After their final 'Walk Off', Albert was announced as the winner leaving Luke as runner up.

=== Contestants ===
(Ages stated are at start of contest)

Contestant	Age	Height	Hometown	Finish	Place
Jono Namara	19	1.80 m (5 ft 11 in)	London	Episode 4	11-12
Katie Furler	19	1.75 m (5 ft 9 in)	Devon	Episode 4	11-12
James Dunstan	19	1.85 m (6 ft 1 in)	Ipswich	Episode 8	9-10
Kerrie Johnson	17	1.78 m (5 ft 10 in)	Birmingham	Episode 8	9-10
Anya James	19	1.75 m (5 ft 9 in)	London	Episode 12	8-7
Josh Murad	18	1.85 m (6 ft 1 in)	London	Episode 12	8-7
Sennait Adhanom	20	1.74 m (5 ft 8 1/2 in)	Middlesex	Episode 16	6-5
Waz Ashayer	17	1.83 m (6 ft 0 in)	Marlborough	Episode 16	6-5
Marianne Berglund	18	1.78 m (5 ft 10 in)	Umeå, Sweden	Episode 19	4
Jen Hunter	24	1.79 m (5 ft 10 1/2 in)	Wigan	Episode 19	3
Luke Farrell	19	1.85 m (6 ft 1 in)	London	Episode 19	2
Albert Mordue	20	1.88 m (6 ft 2 in)	Cornwall	Episode 19	1

=== Contestant elimination progress ===
Model Elimination Progress
Place	Model	Episodes				
Place	Model	4	8	12	16	19
1	Albert	SAFE	SAFE	WO	SAFE	WIN
2	Luke	SAFE	SAFE	SAFE	WO	OUT
3	Jen	SAFE	SAFE	WO	WO	OUT
4	Marianne	BTM 4	SAFE	SAFE	SAFE	OUT
5-6	Sennait	SAFE	SAFE	SAFE	OUT	
5-6	Waz	SAFE	WO	SAFE	OUT	
7-8	Anya	SAFE	WO	OUT		
7-8	Josh	BTM 4	SAFE	OUT		
9-10	Kerrie	SAFE	OUT			
9-10	James	SAFE	OUT			
11-12	Katie	OUT				
11-12	Jono	OUT				

The model was in the bottom four in week one.
The model was eliminated purely by the judges at the end of the first week.
The model was in the live 'Walk Off' that week but survived the public vote.
The model was in the live 'Walk Off' and was eliminated by the public.
The model won the competition.

== Make Me a Supermodel Extra ==
The behind-the-scenes show Make Me a Supermodel Extra, broadcast on the channel Five Life, was presented by Anthony Crank, and series-one contestant Jasmine Lennard, who was dropped after referring to Rachel Hunter as "Rachel Munter" live on air.

== International versions ==
Currently airing franchise
Franchise with an upcoming season
Franchise no longer airing

Country	Title	Broadcaster	Presenters	Air Dates
Australia	Make Me a Supermodel	Seven Network	Jennifer Hawkins & Tyson Beckford	Season 1: 6 August 2008 – 20 November 2008
Malaysia	I Wanna Be a Model	8TV	Dylan Liong (season 1-2); Lynn Lim (season 1-2); Cheryl Lee (season 3); Jefferey Cheng (season 3); Lynn Lim (season 4)	Season 1: 5 August 2006 – 28 October 2006; Season 2: 26 August 2007 – 11 November 2007; Season 3: 5 July 2009 – 27 September 2009; Season 4: 1 May 2016 – 24 July 2016
United Kingdom	Make Me a Supermodel	Channel 5	Rachel Hunter	Season 1: 14 March 2005 – 4 April 2005; Season 2: 15 October 2006 – 16 November 2006
United States	Make Me a Supermodel	Bravo	Tyson Beckford; Niki Taylor (season 1); Nicole Trunfio (season 2)	Season 1: 2 January 2008 – 3 April 2008; Season 2: 4 March 2009 – 3 June 2009
