= The Spy Who Loved Me (film) =

1977 James Bond film by Lewis Gilbert

- Theatrical release poster by Bob Peak
- Directed by: Lewis Gilbert
- Screenplay by: Christopher Wood; Richard Maibaum
- Based on: James Bond by Ian Fleming
- Produced by: Albert R. Broccoli
- Starring: Roger Moore; Barbara Bach; Curt Jurgens
- Cinematography: Claude Renoir
- Edited by: John Glen
- Music by: Marvin Hamlisch
- Production company: Eon Productions
- Distributed by: United Artists
- Release dates: 7 July 1977 (London, premiere); 8 July 1977 (United Kingdom); 13 July 1977 (United States)
- Running time: 125 minutes
- Countries: United Kingdom; United States
- Language: English
- Budget: $13.5 million
- Box office: $185.4 million

The Spy Who Loved Me is a 1977 spy film, the tenth in the James Bond series produced by Eon Productions. It is the third to star Roger Moore as the fictional secret agent James Bond and the second to be directed by Lewis Gilbert. The film co-stars Barbara Bach and Curt Jurgens. The screenplay was by Christopher Wood and Richard Maibaum, with an uncredited rewrite by Tom Mankiewicz. It is the first Bond film not to be co-produced by Harry Saltzman, who sold his 50% stake in Danjaq, LLC, the parent company of Eon Productions, following the release of the previous film The Man with the Golden Gun.

The film takes its title from Ian Fleming's 1962 novel The Spy Who Loved Me, the tenth book in the James Bond series, though it does not contain any elements of the novel's plot. The storyline involves a reclusive megalomaniac named Karl Stromberg who plans to destroy the world and create a new civilisation under the sea. Bond teams up with Soviet agent Anya Amasova to stop Stromberg all while being hunted by Stromberg’s powerful henchman Jaws.

It was shot from August to December 1976 on location in Egypt (Cairo and Luxor) and Italy (Costa Smeralda, Sardinia), with underwater scenes filmed at the Bahamas (Nassau), and a new soundstage built at Pinewood Studios for a massive set which depicted the interior of a supertanker. The Spy Who Loved Me was well received by critics, who saw the film as a return to form for the franchise and praised Moore's performance. Moore himself called the film his personal favourite of his tenure as Bond. The soundtrack composed by Marvin Hamlisch also met with success. The film was nominated for three Academy Awards amid many other nominations and novelised in 1977 by Christopher Wood as James Bond, the Spy Who Loved Me.

The Spy Who Loved Me was followed by Moonraker in 1979.

== Plot ==
Two ballistic missile submarines—one British and one Soviet—suddenly vanish, prompting MI6 agent James Bond (007) to investigate. En route to his briefing, he is ambushed during a downhill ski chase in Austria by Soviet agents led by Sergei Barsov, whom he kills whilst escaping. The plans for an advanced submarine-tracking system are being offered for sale in Egypt, where Bond encounters KGB agent Major Anya Amasova (Triple X), who is also pursuing the microfilm plans. They travel across Egypt and encounter Jaws, a tall assassin with razor-sharp steel teeth.

After their British and Soviet superiors agree to a truce, Bond and Amasova reluctantly join forces. They discover evidence linking the plans to Swedish shipping tycoon and reclusive scientist Karl Stromberg. Whilst travelling by train to Stromberg's base in Sardinia, Bond saves Amasova from Jaws, and their rivalry develops into affection. Posing as a marine biologist and his wife, they visit the base and learn that he launched a mysterious supertanker, Liparus, nine months earlier. As they leave, his henchmen pursue them by motorcycle, car and helicopter. They escape underwater in Bond's Lotus Esprit from Q Branch, which converts into a submarine. Jaws survives a spectacular crash, while Bond destroys the helicopter piloted by Stromberg's assistant Naomi with a sea-air missile. Examining Stromberg's underwater Atlantis base, they confirm that he operates the tracking system and evade an attack by his minisubs. Bond later learns that Liparus has never visited any port or harbour. Amasova discovers that Bond killed Barsov, her lover, and vows to kill him once their mission is complete.

Stromberg's hideout, Atlantis

Bond and Amasova board the American submarine, USS Wayne, to investigate Liparus. The tanker captures Wayne and is revealed to be a floating submarine dock containing the missing British and Soviet submarines. Stromberg then launches his plan: nuclear missiles fired simultaneously from the captured submarines will destroy Moscow and New York City, triggering a global nuclear war. He intends to survive in Atlantis and establish a new underwater civilisation.

Stromberg takes Amasova to Atlantis, but Bond retreats and frees the British, Russian and American sailors. They fight the Liparus crew, suffering heavy casualties, and seize the control room. The dying captain reveals that the British and Soviet submarines are primed to launch their missiles within minutes. Bond tricks the submarines into firing at each other, destroying both vessels and Stromberg's crews. The surviving submariners escape the sinking Liparus aboard Wayne.

The Pentagon orders Wayne to destroy Atlantis, but Bond insists on rescuing Amasova first. He confronts and kills Stromberg, then battles Jaws and drops him into a shark tank. Jaws kills the tiger shark and escapes. Bond and Amasova flee Atlantis in an escape pod as it is destroyed by torpedoes. Amasova points Bond's gun at him but ultimately spares him, and they embrace. The Royal Navy recovers the pod, while their superiors watch the two spies' intimate exchange through its porthole.

== Cast ==
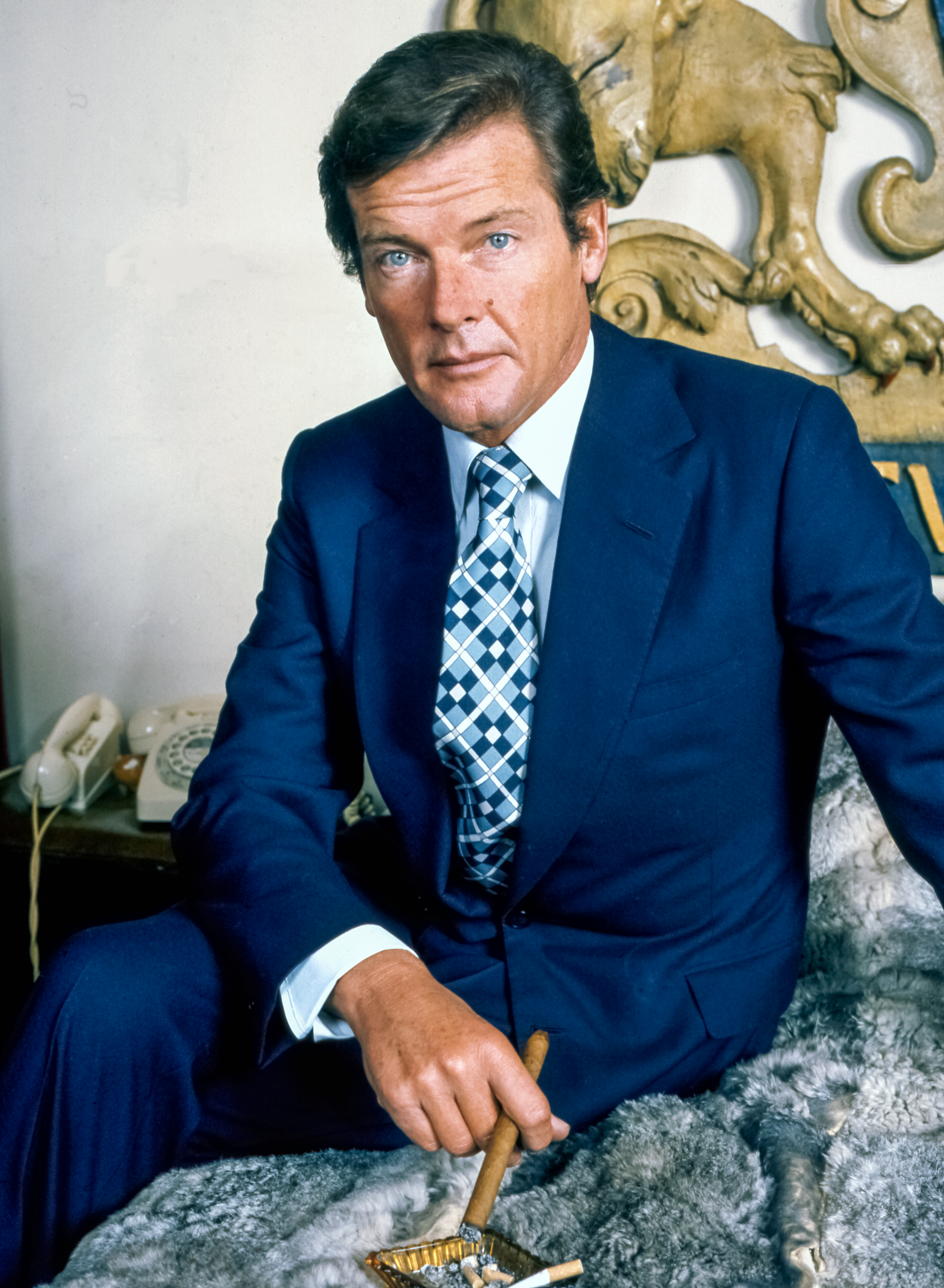
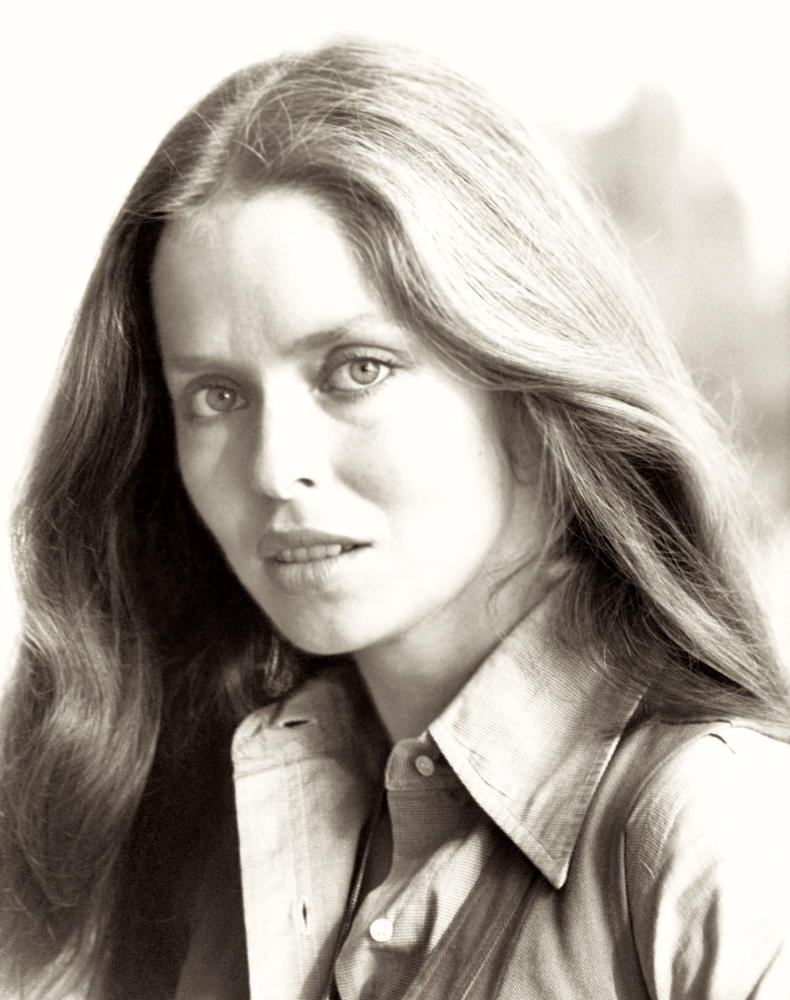
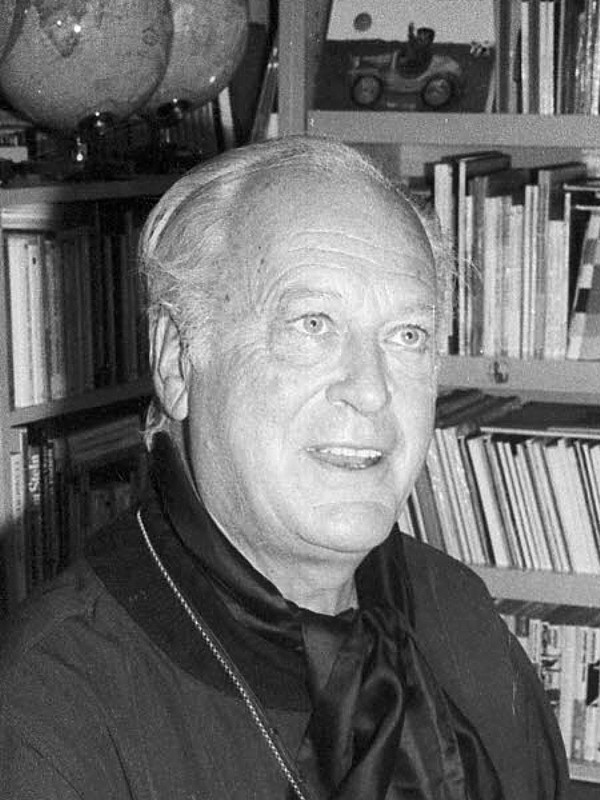
Roger Moore (left) in 1973, Barbara Bach (middle) in 1978 and Curt Jurgens in 1976
- Roger Moore as James Bond, British MI6 agent 007, assigned to investigate the theft of two submarines
- Barbara Bach as Anya Amasova, a Soviet KGB agent XXX, also investigating the theft. Bach was cast only four days before principal photography began, and performed her audition expecting a supporting role.
- Curt Jurgens as Karl Stromberg, a megalomaniac planning to trigger World War III and destroy the world, then recreate a new civilisation underwater. Jurgens's casting was a suggestion of director Lewis Gilbert, who had worked with him before.
- Richard Kiel as Jaws, Stromberg's seemingly indestructible juggernaut of a henchman, afflicted with gigantism and having a set of metal teeth
- Caroline Munro as Naomi, Stromberg's personal pilot and a would-be assassin. Munro's casting was inspired by an advertisement campaign she had made. Her voice was dubbed by an uncredited Barbara Jefford, who had previously dubbed Daniela Bianchi in From Russia with Love.
- Geoffrey Keen as Sir Frederick Gray (credited as Minister of Defence). Keen would reprise the role in five more Bond films.
- Edward de Souza as Sheikh Hosein, an Arab sheikh and old friend of Bond; they were students at the University of Cambridge
- George Baker as Captain Benson, a British naval officer stationed at the Royal Navy's Faslane Naval Base in Scotland
- Lois Maxwell as Miss Moneypenny, M's secretary
- Walter Gotell as General Gogol, the head of the KGB and Amasova's boss. Gotell previously played Morzeny in From Russia with Love. Gotell would also reprise this role for five more Bond films.
- Vernon Dobtcheff as Max Kalba, an Egyptian nightclub owner and black market racketeer who possesses the microfilm and tries to encourage Bond and Amasova to bid for it
- Desmond Llewelyn as Q, MI6's head of research and development. He supplies Bond with unique vehicles and gadgets. Amasova refers to him as Major Boothroyd, the name of the armourer in Dr. No who becomes the head of Q Branch in From Russia With Love.
- Michael Billington as Sergei Barsov, Soviet agent and Anya Amasova's lover. Billington had previously screentested for the role of Bond.
- Bernard Lee as M, the head of MI6
- Shane Rimmer as Commander Carter, commanding officer of USS Wayne
- Bryan Marshall as Commander Talbott, commanding officer of HMS Ranger
- Nadim Sawalha as Aziz Fekkesh, a middle-man on the trail of the stolen microfilm
- Robert Brown as Admiral Hargraves, a British Royal Navy official. Brown would later play M in four films from Octopussy to Licence to Kill.
- Sue Vanner as Log Cabin Girl, a Soviet agent who sets a trap for 007 in the pre-credit sequence

Other actors in smaller roles include Sydney Tafler as the Captain of the Liparus, Eva Rueber-Staier as Rubelvitch, General Gogol's secretary; Milton Reid as Sandor, one of Stromberg's thugs; Olga Bisera as Felicca, Fekkesh's glamorous associate; Valerie Leon as the hotel receptionist in Sardinia, Cyril Shaps as Professor Bechmann, Milo Sperber as Dr. Markovitz, Albert Moses as an Egyptian bartender, and Marilyn Galsworthy as Stromberg's secretary.

Nicholas Campbell, Bob Sherman, Murray Salem, John Truscott, Vincent Marzello, Garrick Hagon, Ray Jewers, and George Mallaby appear as USS Wayne crewmen. Kevin McNally, Jeremy Bulloch, Sean Bury, David Auker, Keith Buckley, and John Salthouse appear as HMS Ranger crewmen.

The assistant director for the Italian locations, Victor Tourjansky, had a cameo as a man drinking his wine as Bond's Lotus emerges from the beach. As an in-joke, he returned in similar appearances in another two Bond films shot in Italy, Moonraker (the Venice gondola sequence) and For Your Eyes Only (during the ski chase).

== Production ==
Given the relatively poor financial returns and generally unfavourable response of critics to its predecessor, The Man with the Golden Gun (1974), The Spy Who Loved Me was a pivotal film for the Bond franchise. The project was plagued with difficulties from the outset, the first being the departure of Bond producer Harry Saltzman, who was forced to sell his half of the Bond film franchise in 1975 for £20 million. Saltzman had branched out into several other unsuccessful business ventures, including an unfilmed biopic about Cuthbert Grant starring Sean Connery, and consequently was struggling through personal financial reversals unrelated to Bond. Saltzman offered his shares in the company as collateral for his loans, and UBS attempted to foreclose on them. When Saltzman's attempted hostile takeover of Technicolor led to a lawsuit, Broccoli refused to allow him to use Danjaq funds, leading to a deadlock in the company as Saltzman refused to allow another Bond film to go forward. This was exacerbated by the twin personal tragedies of his wife's terminal cancer and many of the symptoms of clinical depression in himself.

Danjaq's distribution agreement with United Artists required it to produce a Bond adaptation every 18 months or run the risk of losing the rights to the series to United Artists if it did not. However, Saltzman continued blocking production on another Bond film and refused to allow Broccoli to buy his shares. Maurice Binder and Broccoli held negotiations about selling Saltzman's shares to Adnan Khashoggi, David Frost, Lord Hanson, and Lord Harlech. Saltzman finally agreed to sell his shares directly to United Artists so that another Bond film could go forward. Although Broccoli initially objected to the deal, he acquiesced after Saltzman received a counter-offer to sell his rights to the rival studio Columbia Pictures.

Another troubling aspect of the production was the difficulty in obtaining a director. Guy Hamilton, who had directed the previous three Bond films as well as Goldfinger (1964), was initially set to direct. However, in November 1975, he left after being offered the opportunity to direct the 1978 film Superman, although Richard Donner subsequently took over the project. Steven Spielberg, who had finished Jaws (1975) months earlier, approached Broccoli about wanting to direct the next Bond film, but Broccoli declined his offer. By December of that year, Broccoli hired Lewis Gilbert, who had directed the earlier Bond film You Only Live Twice (1967), after screening his then-latest film, Operation Daybreak (1975).

=== Writing ===
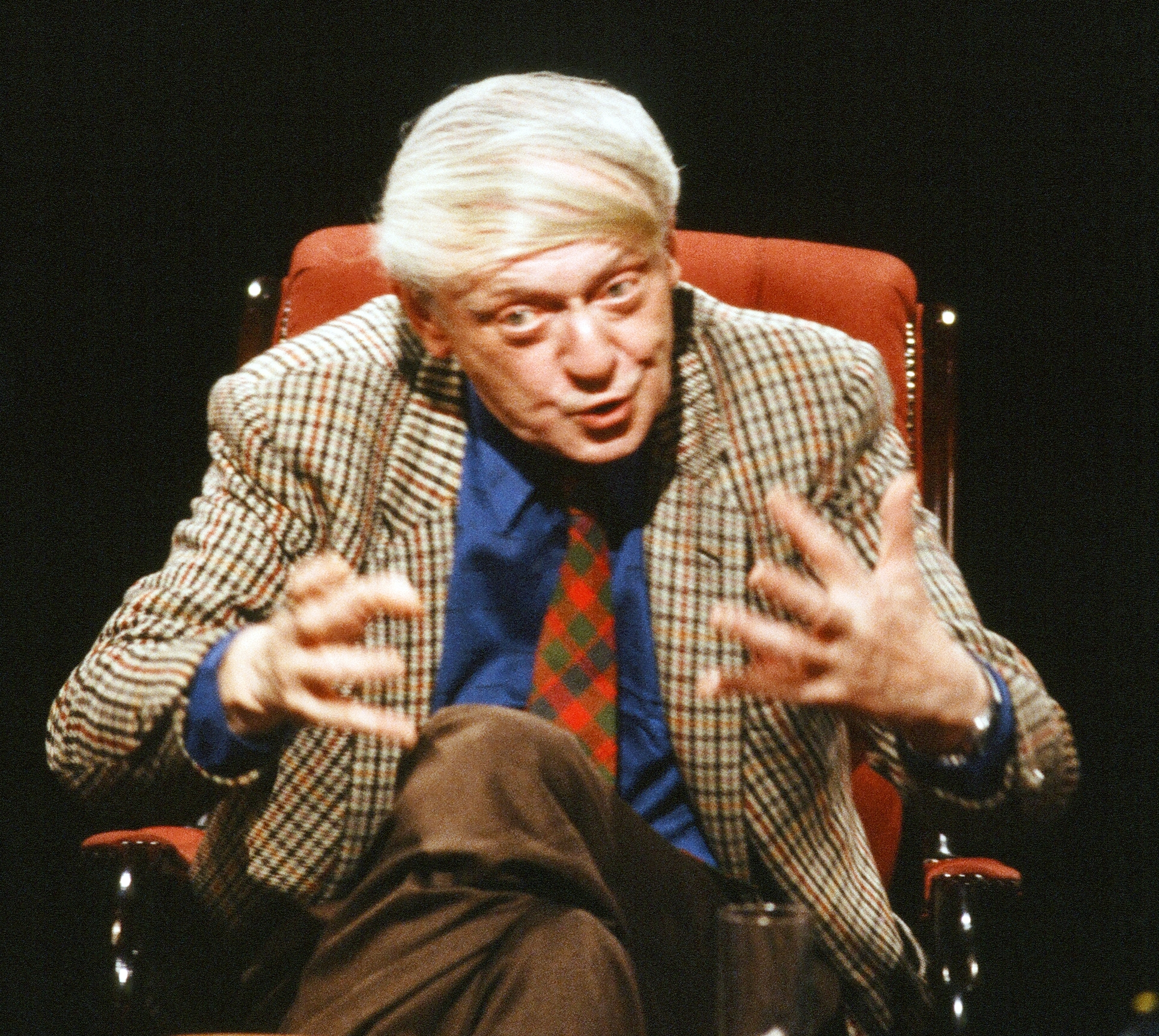
Anthony Burgess was among the writers who initially worked on the script.

Ian Fleming permitted Eon to use only the name of his novel but not the actual plot. Broccoli commissioned a number of writers to work on the script, including Stirling Silliphant, John Landis, Ronald Hardy, Anthony Burgess, Cary Bates, and Derek Marlowe. The British television producer Gerry Anderson also stated that he provided a film treatment (although originally planned to be Moonraker) very similar to what ended up as The Spy Who Loved Me. Bates's script featured Bond and his former ally Tatiana Romanova teaming up to stop a SPECTRE hijacking of a nuclear submarine coordinated by Hugo Drax from a base underneath Loch Ness. Burgess's draft, featuring characters from his previous novel Tremor of Intent: An Eschatological Spy Novel, featured Bond fighting the criminal organisation CHAOS in Singapore and thwarting a plot to assassinate Queen Elizabeth II by a bombing of Sydney Opera House. Andrew Biswell of the International Anthony Burgess Foundation described it as "an outrageous medley of sadism, hypnosis, acupuncture, and international terrorism." Landis, working in the same office as Burgess, wrote a separate screenplay about Bond stopping a kidnapping of the Pope in Latin America.

Eventually, Richard Maibaum provided the initial draft, and at first he tried to incorporate ideas from all of the other writers into his script. Maibaum's original script featured an alliance of international terrorists—including the Red Brigades, the Baader-Meinhof Gang, the Black September Organization, and the Japanese Red Army—attacking SPECTRE's headquarters in Norway and deposing Ernst Stavro Blofeld, before trying to destroy the world with nuclear SLBM attacks on the world's petroleum reservoirs to make way for a New World Order. Maibaum did location scouting in Budapest for the concept. However, this was shelved because Broccoli felt it was too political.

After Gilbert was reinstated as director, he decided to bring in another writer, Christopher Wood. Gilbert also decided to fix what he felt the previous Roger Moore films were doing wrong, which was writing the Bond character too much the way Sean Connery played him, and instead portray Bond closer to the books – "very English, very smooth, good sense of humour". Broccoli asked Wood to create a villain with metal teeth, Jaws, inspired by a metal brace-wearing henchman named Sol "Horror" Horowitz, and his short bald accomplice Sandor inspired by Sluggsy Morant in Fleming's novel.

Broccoli agreed to Wood's proposed changes, but before he could set to work there were more legal complications. In the years since Thunderball (1965), Kevin McClory had set up two film companies and had been cleared to produce a rival Bond film after the imposed ten-year moratorium had expired. He was in development of a film project, with the working title Warhead, in collaboration with Sean Connery and novelist Len Deighton. McClory had learned of Broccoli's plans to use SPECTRE, an organisation that had first been created by Fleming while working with McClory and Jack Whittingham on the first attempt to film Thunderball, back even before it was a novel, in the late 1950s. McClory filed an injunction against Eon Productions alleging copyright infringement. Not wishing to extend the already ongoing legal dispute that could have delayed the production of The Spy Who Loved Me, Broccoli requested Wood remove all references to Blofeld and SPECTRE from the script. In June 1976, McClory was awarded the sole rights to SPECTRE and Blofeld.

Broccoli decided to include the KGB in the film as Bond's allies after showing a group of Russians a James Bond film during the production of The Blue Bird (1976) in the Soviet Union. When they enjoyed the film but commented that it could not be shown there because it was too "anti-Russian," Broccoli decided to include characters such as Amasova and Gogol who would be "not a hero, not a villain, but acceptable in terms of Russian distribution."

Tom Mankiewicz, who worked on the three preceding Bond films, claims he was called in to do an extensive rewrite of the script. Mankiewicz says he did not receive credit, because Broccoli was limited to the number of non-British in key positions he could employ on the films to obtain Eady Levy assistance. Vernon Harris also did uncredited rewrites on the script.

=== Filming ===
The Lotus Esprit as seen diving into the sea and then in submarine mode

Tom Mankiewicz claimed that Catherine Deneuve wanted to play the female lead and was willing to cut her normal rate from $400,000 per picture to $250,000, but Broccoli would not pay above $80,000. Marthe Keller and Dominique Sanda were also considered, while the original frontrunner Lois Chiles was not pursued after her agent informed the producers that she had retired. Danton Rissner, who was working for United Artists, lobbied to get a screentest for Barbara Bach, which she successfully passed. Before the casting of Richard Kiel, Will Sampson, David Prowse and Jack O'Halloran (according to O'Halloran) were considered to play Jaws.

The film was shot at the Pinewood Studios in London, Porto Cervo in Sardinia (Hotel Cala di Volpe), Egypt (Karnak, Mosque of Ibn Tulun, Gayer-Anderson Museum, Abu Simbel temples), Malta, Scotland, Hayling Island UK, Okinawa, Switzerland and Mount Asgard on Baffin Island in the then northern Canadian territory of Northwest Territories (now located in Nunavut).

As no studio was big enough for the interior of Stromberg's supertanker, and set designer Ken Adam did not want to repeat what he had done with SPECTRE's volcano base in You Only Live Twice – "a workable but ultimately wasteful set" – construction began in March 1976 of a new sound stage at Pinewood, the 007 Stage, at a cost of $1.8 million. To complement this stage, Eon also paid for building a water tank capable of storing approximately 1,200,000 imperial gallons (5,500,000 L). The soundstage was so huge that cinematographer Claude Renoir found himself unable to effectively light it due to his deteriorating eyesight, and so according to Ken Adam, Stanley Kubrick visited the production, in secret, to advise on how to light the stage. The studio had water right to draw well water from below the stage then saved the water for future use, so filming was possible during the 1976 UK heatwave. For the supertanker exterior, while Shell was willing to lend an abandoned tanker to the production, the elevated insurance and safety risks caused it to be replaced with miniatures built by Derek Meddings's team and shot in the Bahamas. The tanker miniature was 63 feet (19 m) long with three sailors, and designed as a catamaran so it could swallow the submarine miniatures by driving over them. Stromberg's shark tank was also filmed in the Bahamas, using a live shark in a saltwater swimming pool. Adam decided to do experiments with curved shapes for the scenery, as he felt all his previous setpieces were "too linear". This was demonstrated with the Atlantis, which is a dome and curved surfaces outside, and many curved objects in Stromberg's office inside. For Gogol's offices, Adam wanted an open space to contrast M's enclosed headquarters, and drew inspiration from Sergei Eisenstein to do a "Russian crypt-like" set.

The main unit began its work in August 1976 in Sardinia. Don McLaughlan, then head of public relations at Lotus Cars, heard that Eon was shopping for a new Bond car. He drove a prototype Lotus Esprit with all Lotus branding taped over, and parked it outside the Eon offices at Pinewood studios; on seeing the car, Eon asked Lotus to borrow both of the prototypes for filming. Initial filming of the car chase resulted in disappointing action sequences. While moving the car between shoots, Lotus test driver Roger Becker so impressed the crew with his handling of the car that for the rest of filming on Sardinia, Becker became the stunt driver.

The motorcycle sidecar missile used in one chase sequence was built by film staff at Pinewood and used a standard Kawasaki Z900 and a custom-made sidecar outfit. The sidecar was made large enough so that a stuntman could lie flat inside. It had 10-inch scooter wheels, a Suzuki 185 engine, and the detached projectile was steered through a small solid rubber wheel at the front. A heavily smoked perspex nose allowed the stuntman sufficient visibility to steer the device whilst being entirely hidden from view. A pincer-type lock held the sidecar in place until operated by the pilot via a solenoid switch. The sequences involving the outfit were sped up, as the weight of the sidecar made the outfit very difficult to control.

In October, the second unit travelled to Nassau to film the underwater sequences. To create the illusion of the car becoming a submarine, seven different models were used, one for each step of the transformation. One of the models, designed by Derby marine engineer Alex Leam, was a fully mobile submarine, "Wet Nellie", equipped with an engine built by Miami-based Perry Submarines. The car seen entering the sea was a mock-up shell, propelled off the jetty by a compressed air cannon, whilst the first underwater shot of the car was a miniature model filmed in a test tank. Three full-size bodyshells were used to depict the actual car-to-submersible transition. During the model sequences, the air bubbles seen appearing from the vehicle were created by Alka-Seltzer tablets or from divers driving the submarine, who were hidden by the black louvres of the Esprit in submarine mode.

In September, production moved to Egypt. While the Great Sphinx of Giza was shot on location, lighting problems caused the pyramids to be replaced with miniatures. While construction of the Liparus set continued, the second unit (headed by John Glen) departed for Mount Asgard, Baffin Island, where in July 1976 they staged the film's pre-credits sequence. Bond film veteran Willy Bogner captured the action, staged by stuntman Rick Sylvester, who earned $30,000 for the stunt. The scene of Bond skiing off the mountain was inspired by a Canadian Club Whisky advertisement in Playboy magazine of Sylvester performing the same stunt. This stunt cost $500,000 – the most expensive single movie stunt at that time. Additional scenes for the pre-credits sequence were filmed in the Bernina Range in the Swiss Alps.

The production team received permission to film at the Faslane submarine base, saving millions of dollars. After Faslane, production moved to Spain, Portugal and the Bay of Biscay, where the supertanker exteriors were filmed. On 5 December 1976, with principal photography finished, the 007 Stage was formally opened by former Prime Minister Harold Wilson.

=== Music ===
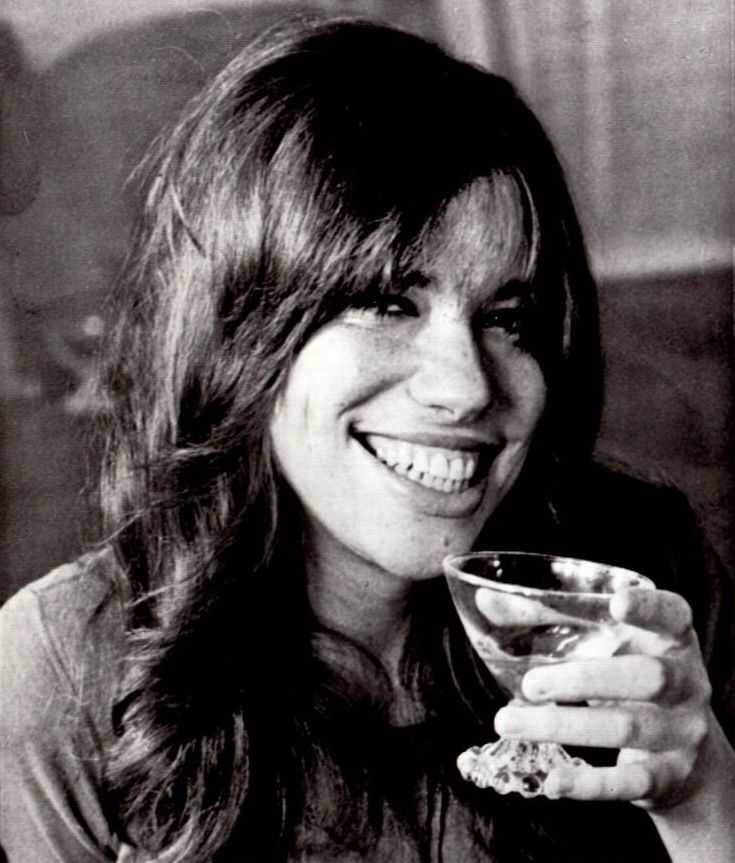
Carly Simon sang the theme song, "Nobody Does It Better".

The theme song, "Nobody Does It Better", was composed by Marvin Hamlisch, with lyrics by Carole Bayer Sager, and performed by Carly Simon. It was the first theme song in the series with a different title to that of the film.

The soundtrack to the film was composed by Marvin Hamlisch, who filled in for veteran John Barry, who was unavailable to work in the United Kingdom for tax reasons.

== Release and reception ==
On top of the production budget, $7.5 million was spent on advertising, prints and parties for The Spy Who Loved Me. On 20 May 1977, Roger Moore and Barbara Bach attended the Cannes Film Festival to promote the film's upcoming release. It opened with a Royal Premiere attended by Princess Anne at the Odeon Leicester Square in London on 7 July 1977. It opened to the public on the following day in London plus at 2 cinemas in Dublin. It started to open in the United States from 13 July 1977 and in Canada from 15 July and simultaneously in Hong Kong.

In its first six days at the Odeon Leicester Square it set a house record of £50,079. In its opening five days from 200 locations in the United States and Canada it grossed $1.5 million. It went on to gross $185.4 million worldwide, with £10 million in the United Kingdom and $46 million in the United States and Canada. It was United Artists' highest-grossing film at the time. On 25 August 2006, the film was re-released at the Empire, Leicester Square for one week. It was again shown at the Empire Leicester Square on 20 April 2008 when Lewis Gilbert attended the first digital screening of the film.

Eon executive Charles Juroe said that at a screening attended by Charles, Prince of Wales, during the Union Jack-parachute scene: "I have never seen a reaction in the cinema as there was that night. You couldn't help it. You could not help but stand up. Even Prince Charles stood up." This scene came in second place in a 2013 Sky Movies poll for greatest moment of the James Bond film franchise, beaten only by the "No, Mr. Bond, I expect you to die!" sequence from Goldfinger. It was Roger Moore's favourite Bond film, and many reviewers consider it the best instalment to star the actor.

=== Contemporary reviews ===
Janet Maslin of The New York Times considered the film formulaic and "half an hour too long, thanks to the obligatory shoot-'em-up conclusion, ... nevertheless the dullest sequence here" but praised Moore's performance and the film's "share of self-mockery", which she found refreshing. Charles Champlin of the Los Angeles Times felt "The Spy Who Loved Me is an extravagant silliness, a high-cost undertaking in let's pretend which delivers a perfect formula. It may not be everyone's tonic, but it is what it says it is, rousingly." Gene Siskel of The Chicago Tribune praised the ski jump stunt in which he wrote that "you begin to think Spy may turn out to be as good as From Russia with Love, the best Bond of all. No such luck. True, opening pace of Spy is impossible to sustain, but the rest of the picture is merely good, not great." He also found Stromberg to be less memorable than previous Bond villains, even noting that "Jaws is far more entertaining than his master." Variety remarked the film "is unoriginal and mild on suspense as these capers go. But the gimmick-laden action is bountiful and eye-ravishing, and will compensate most audiences."

Christopher Porterfield, reviewing for Time magazine, was complimentary of the pre-titles sequence and Richard Kiel's performance as Jaws. However, he criticised the film for being too similar to previous instalments, remarking "[a]ll that's left of Bond formula here is 007 character, sexy starlets and gee-whiz gadgets. (Question: What else did it ever consist of?)" Similarly, Maureen Orth of Newsweek wrote: "After the opening sequence, much of the action in The Spy Who Loved Me, the tenth James Bond screen epic and the third starring Roger Moore as Bond, is somewhat downhill. But the film, shot in seven countries, is so rich in fantasy, so filled with beautiful scenery, gorgeous women, preposterous villains and impossible situations that it's easier to suspend disbelief entirely and escape inside the gadgetry and glamour."

John Simon, writing in his book Reverse Angle, stated "There is a kind of film that can get away with everything, and deserves to. The latest James Bond, Spy Who Loved Me, belongs in that class." Gary Arnold of The Washington Post dismissed the film as "a tolerable disappointment. The Bond movies have been so successful that it may be commercially impossible to terminate the series. However, it's been quite a while since a Bond adventure appeared to set fashions in escapist, glamorous entertainment. Once widely imitated and parodied by other producers, Bond films are now more likely to imitate themselves with decreasing effectiveness."

=== Retrospective reviews ===
On the website FilmCritic.com, Christopher Null awarded the film 3 1/2 stars out of 5, in which he praised the gadgets, particularly the Lotus Esprit car. James Berardinelli of Reelviews wrote that the film is "suave and sophisticated", and Barbara Bach proves to be an ideal Bond girl – "attractive, smart, sexy, and dangerous". Brian Webster stated the special effects were "good for a 1979 [sic] film", and Marvin Hamlisch's music, "memorable". Danny Peary described The Spy Who Loved Me as "exceptional ... For once, the big budget was not wasted. Interestingly, while the sets and gimmicks were the most spectacular to date, Bond and the other characters are toned down (there's a minimum of slapstick humour) so that they are more realistic than in other Roger Moore films. Moore gives his best performance in the series ... [Bond and Anya Amasova] are an appealing couple, equal in every way. Film is a real treat – a well acted, smartly cast, sexy, visually impressive, lavishly produced, powerfully directed mix of a spy romance and a war-mission film."

The Times placed Jaws and Stromberg as the sixth and seventh best Bond villains (respectively) in the series in 2008, and also named the Esprit as the second best car in the series (behind the Aston Martin DB5). On the review aggregation website Rotten Tomatoes, the film has an approval rating of 82% based on 60 reviews with an average rating of 7.20/10. The website's critical consensus reads: "Though it hints at the absurdity to come in later installments, The Spy Who Loved Me's sleek style, menacing villains, and sly wit make it the best of the Roger Moore era." On Metacritic, the film has a weighted average score of 55 based on 12 reviews, indicating "mixed or average reviews".

=== Accolades ===
Award	Category	Nominee(s)	Result	Ref.
Academy Awards	Best Art Direction	Art Direction: Ken Adam and Peter Lamont; Set Decoration: Hugh Scaife	Nominated	
Academy Awards	Best Original Score	Marvin Hamlisch	Nominated	
Academy Awards	Best Original Song	"Nobody Does It Better"; Music by Marvin Hamlisch; Lyrics by Carole Bayer Sager	Nominated	
British Academy Film Awards	Best Original Film Music	Marvin Hamlisch	Nominated	
British Academy Film Awards	Best Production Design	Ken Adam	Nominated	
Golden Globe Awards	Best Original Score	Marvin Hamlisch	Nominated	
Golden Globe Awards	Best Original Song	"Nobody Does It Better"; Music by Marvin Hamlisch; Lyrics by Carole Bayer Sager	Nominated	
Grammy Awards	Best Original Score Written for a Motion Picture or a Television Special	Marvin Hamlisch	Nominated	

- Golden Screen, awarded by the German film industry.
- Writers Guild of America WGA Award: Nominee for Best Comedy Adapted to Another Medium: Christopher Wood and Richard Maibaum.
- 2 nominations for the Saturn Award granted by the United States Science Fiction, Fantasy and Horror Film Academy.
  - Roger Moore for Best Actor.
  - Richard Kiel for Best Supporting Actor.

== Novelisation ==
When Ian Fleming sold the film rights to the James Bond novels to Harry Saltzman and Albert R. Broccoli, he gave permission only for the title The Spy Who Loved Me to be used. Since the screenplay for the film had nothing to do with Fleming's original novel, Eon Productions, for the first time, authorised a novelisation based upon the script.

== Wet Nellie auction ==
The Lotus Esprit, also known as Wet Nellie, capable of transforming from car to submarine in the film, was purchased for £616,000 at a London auction in October 2013 by Elon Musk, who planned to rebuild the vehicle and attempt to make the fictional dual-purpose car be an actual dual-purpose car (underwater and on land).

== See also ==
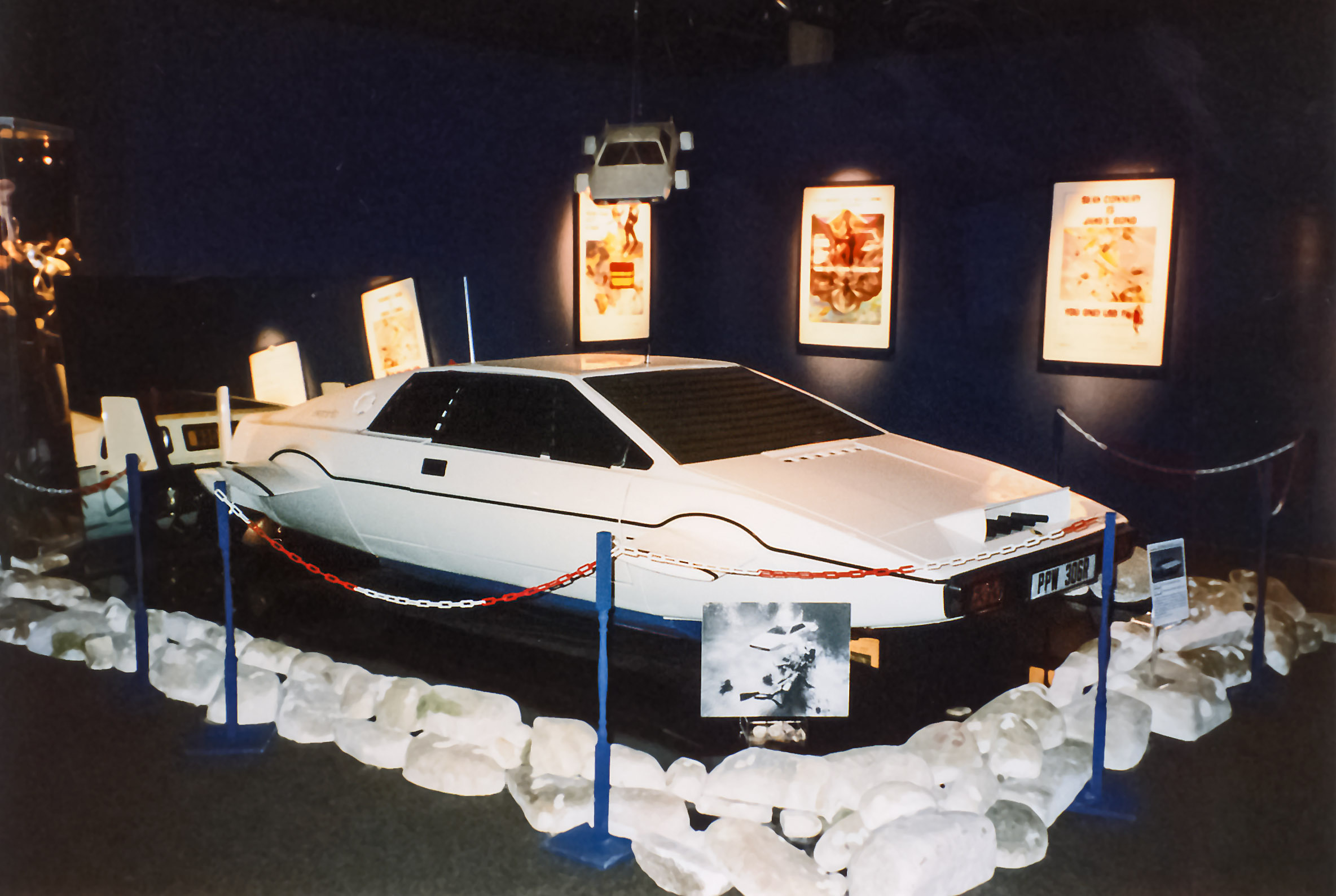
The Lotus car from the film

- James Bond 007: Nightfire, a 2002 video game featuring the Liparus and Atlantis settings from this film, which also includes an Aston Martin Vanquish submarine-car similar to the Lotus Esprit
- "Our Man Bashir", a 1995 episode of the television series Star Trek: Deep Space Nine was largely based on this film.
- Outline of James Bond
- Rinspeed sQuba, a submersible car inspired by the film
