= Barbara Bach =

American actress (born 1947)

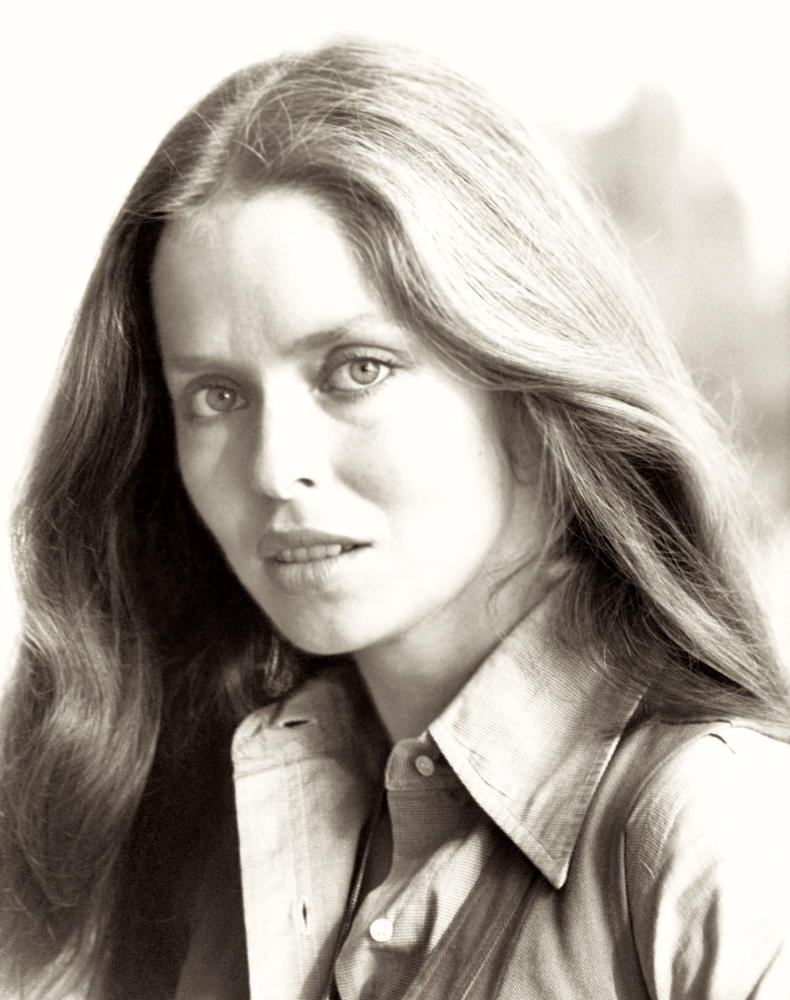
- Bach in 1978
- Born: Barbara Goldbach; August 28, 1946 (age 80); New York City, U.S.
- Occupations: Actress, model
- Years active: 1965–1986
- Spouses: Augusto Gregorini (m. 1966; div. 1975); Ringo Starr (m. 1981)
- Children: 2, including Francesca Gregorini
- Relatives: Zak Starkey (stepson)
- Website: barbara-bach.com

Barbara Bach, Lady Starkey (née Goldbach; born August 28, 1946) is an American actress and model. She played the Bond girl Anya Amasova in The Spy Who Loved Me. She is married to former Beatles drummer Ringo Starr.

== Early life ==
Bach was born Barbara Goldbach in Queens to Marjorie (née McKnight) and Howard Goldbach. Her father was Jewish and of Austrian-Jewish descent, while her mother was a Catholic of Irish descent; Bach and her siblings were raised in their mother's Catholic faith. Her father, who had recently retired from the United States Military at the time of her birth, worked as a police officer for the New York City Police Department.

She was raised in Rosedale, Queens, and graduated from Dominican Commercial High School, a Catholic school for girls, in 1964. The following year, she shortened her surname to Bach and began modeling professionally, appearing in catalogs and fashion magazines.

== Career ==
Bach was one of the most sought-after faces of the 1960s, working with the Eileen Ford Agency in New York, appearing on catalogs and the front covers of several international fashion magazines such as Seventeen (1965 and 1966), Vogue USA (July 1966) photographed by Richard Avedon, ELLE France (1966), Gioia Italy (1967–1970), and Figurino Brazil (1970).

Her acting career started in Italy, where she played Nausicaa in L'Odissea in 1968, an eight-hour long TV adaptation of Homer's epic poem The Odyssey, directed by Franco Rossi and produced by Dino de Laurentiis.

In 1971, Bach co-starred with two other Bond girls, Claudine Auger and Barbara Bouchet, in the mystery Black Belly of the Tarantula (a giallo film) and appeared in other Italian films.

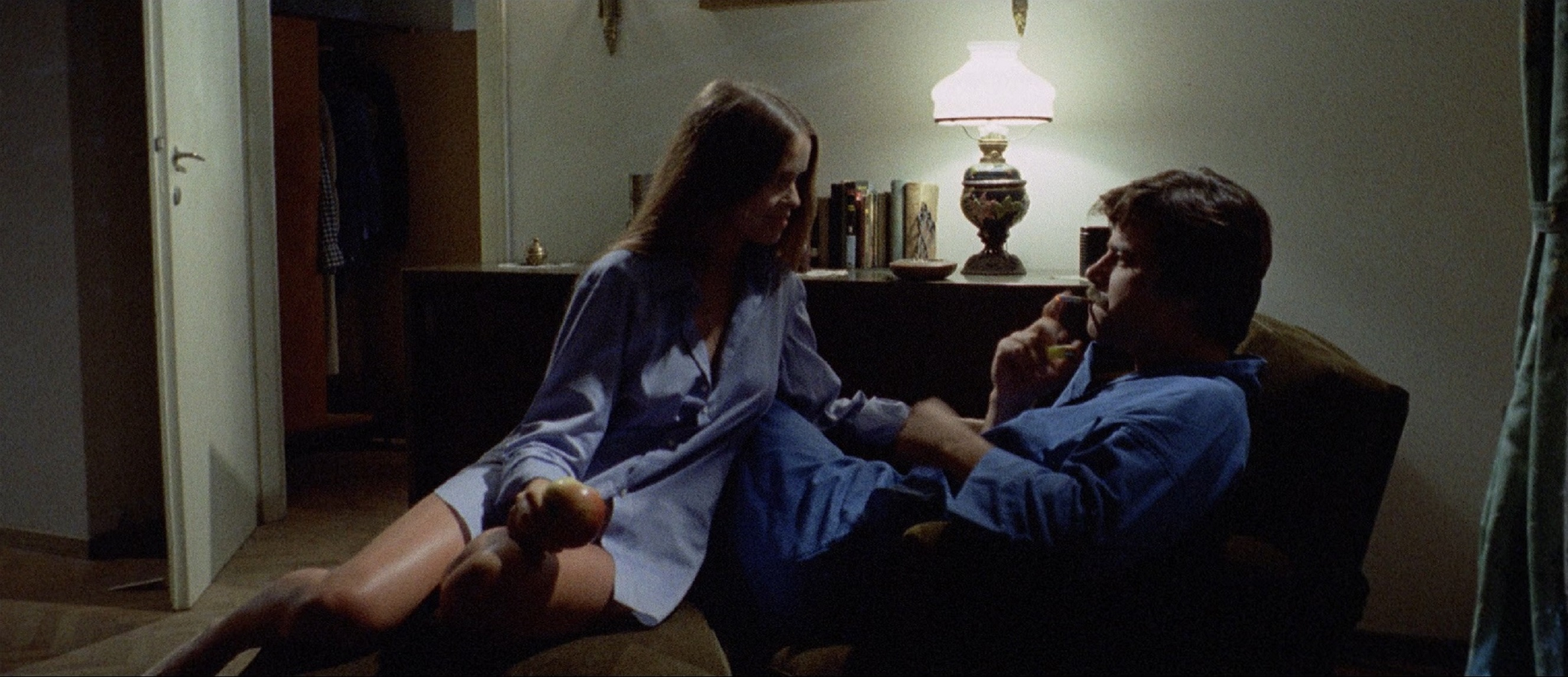
Bach and Jean Sorel in a scene from Short Night of Glass Dolls (1971)

In 1977, Bach portrayed the Russian spy Anya Amasova in the James Bond film The Spy Who Loved Me. Bach remarked after the film that Bond is "a chauvinist pig who uses girls to shield him against bullets." The following year she appeared in the movie Force 10 from Navarone. She lost a role to actress Shelley Hack when she auditioned for season four of the television series Charlie's Angels. During an interview with Johnny Carson on May 9, 1979, she said that she lost the audition for Charlie's Angels because they felt she was too sophisticated in attitude and look, and thought that she was not American, even though she was born in Rosedale and grew up in Jackson Heights, both in Queens, New York City. They asked her manager if she could play an American.

Bach has 28 films to her credit. She was featured in a pictorial in Playboy in January 1981. She also had a cameo in a September 1987 special issue on the Bond girls.

=== Charity work ===
In 1991, Bach co-founded the Self Help Addiction Recovery Program (SHARP) with Pattie Boyd, the former wife of George Harrison and Eric Clapton, both of whom assisted in the venture. Bach and Ringo Starr created The Lotus Foundation, a charity with many sub-charities.

== Personal life ==
Bach's first marriage was to Italian aristocrat and businessman Augusto, Count Gregorini di Savignano di Romagna in 1966. The couple had two children together, including Francesca, before divorcing in 1975. Bach married British musician Ringo Starr, formerly of the Beatles, at Marylebone Town Hall on April 27, 1981. The two met in 1980, on the set of the film Caveman (1981).

Bach struggled with alcoholism and heavy drug use and, along with her husband, Ringo Starr, checked into a rehab in 1988 for four weeks. The couple have remained sober ever since.

According to the International Vegetarian Union, Bach and Starr practice vegetarianism.

She is fluent in Italian and has a working knowledge of French and Spanish.

== Filmography ==
| Year | Title | Role | Notes |
|---|---|---|---|
| 1968 | Odissea | Nausicaa | 6 episodes |
| 1971 | Mio padre Monsignore | Chiara | |
| 1971 | The Black Belly of the Tarantula | Jenny | |
| 1971 | Short Night of Glass Dolls | Mira Svoboda | |
| 1971 | A Few Hours of Sunlight | Héloïse / Elvire | |
| 1973 | The Sensual Man | Anna | |
| 1973 | Il maschio ruspante | Rema | |
| 1973 | Stateline Motel | Emily | |
| 1974 | Street Law | Barbara | |
| 1975 | Legend of the Sea Wolf | Maud Brewster | |
| 1977 | Ecco noi per esempio | Ludovica | |
| 1977 | The Spy Who Loved Me | Major Anya Amasova | |
| 1977 | The Mask of Alexander Cross | Agent Judson | TV film |
| 1978 | Force 10 from Navarone | Maritza Petrovich | |
| 1979 | Island of the Fishmen | Amanda Marvin | |
| 1979 | The Humanoid | Lady Agatha | |
| 1979 | Jaguar Lives! | Anna Thompson | |
| 1979 | The Great Alligator River | Alice Brandt | |
| 1980 | Up the Academy | Bliss | |
| 1981 | Caveman | Lana | |
| 1981 | The Unseen | Jennifer Fast | |
| 1983 | Princess Daisy | Vanessa Valerian | 2 episodes |
| 1984 | Give My Regards to Broad Street | Journalist | Cameo |
| 1986 | To the North of Katmandu | Polo Player | Cameo |
