= Anya Amasova =

Character from James Bond

- James Bond character
- Barbara Bach as Anya Amasova
- Portrayed by: Barbara Bach

In-universe information
- Gender: Female
- Affiliation: KGB (film); SMERSH (novelisation)
- Classification: Bond girl

Major Anya Amasova, also known as Soviet Agent XXX of the KGB, is a fictional character in the 1977 James Bond film The Spy Who Loved Me, portrayed by Barbara Bach.

== Biography ==
After the theft of a submarine, M (Bernard Lee) recalls James Bond (Roger Moore) from a mission where he is currently in a cabin located in Austria (in the novelisation, on the Aiguille du Mort, a mountain near the town of Chamonix). While leaving Bond is ambushed by a Russian team, but kills one of them in self-defence prior to parachuting off the mountain. Unbeknownst to Bond, the agent he killed is Anya Amasova's (Barbara Bach) lover Sergei Barsov (Michael Billington). She has also been recalled from a mission by General Anatoly Gogol (Walter Gotell) of the KGB.

Anya - codenamed "Agent XXX" - meets Bond during a showdown at the Pyramids in Egypt, where her thugs fight with Bond when she believes he has killed Aziz Fekkesh (Nadim Sawalha), an Egyptian contact whose body has been found in one of the pyramids. The real killer was Jaws (Richard Kiel).

However, they become formally introduced to one another in Cairo when they both arrive at Max Kalba's (Vernon Dobtcheff) club. After spouting various biographical details to each other, such as Anya's awareness of Bond's doomed marriage to Tracy Bond (Diana Rigg), they attempt to outbid one another for a secret microfilm. When Kalba is killed by Jaws, they travel across Egypt tracking the microfilm. After Anya ultimately outwits Bond for the microfilm (but Bond had reviewed it), they report to the Abu Simbel temple where Gogol and M have decided to work together to find out how and why their submarines are being stolen while at sea.

For most of the film Bond and Anya have the same mission objectives and try to achieve the same goals often by attempting to outdo one another, during which they fall in love. While travelling to Sardinia by train they share a meal together and while Anya is preparing for bed in her carriage, having politely declined Bond's offer of a nightcap, she is attacked by Jaws. Bond hears the sounds of a struggle over the noise of the train and arrives just in time to save her from being killed. After a brief fight Jaws is dispatched out of a window and Bond returns to Anya, who tends to a cut on his shoulder before they kiss and ultimately spend the night together. On Sardinia, Anya accompanies Bond to meet Karl Stromberg (Curd Jürgens) posing as Bond's wife. Afterwards Anya learns that 007 killed her lover. She then tells Bond that she will ultimately have her revenge once their mission is complete.

Anya is later captured by Stromberg and held captive at Atlantis, Stromberg's undersea base. Bond sneaks aboard and rescues her. As the mission reaches its end, she points her gun at Bond, only to discover that she is too in love with him to kill him.

Anya (pointing the gun at Bond), tells him: "The mission is over, Commander". At that moment, as Anya is tightening her finger on the trigger, the cork pops off of a champagne bottle that Bond is in the process of opening. Anya smiles, stifling a giggle, and Bond says "In my country, Major, the condemned man is usually allowed a final request" to which she says "Granted". Bond then suggests that they get out of their wet clothes.

When the escape pod with James and Anya goes into the ship Bond saved from Stromberg's 'instruments of Armageddon', Q (Desmond Llewelyn), M, and Anya's superiors from Russia look inside a window at James and Anya making love in the luxury bed in awe. "James!" Anya says as she is the first one in the pod to see the duo's superiors.

It was planned to have Amasova make a cameo in Moonraker (which was released in 1979), as the woman in bed with General Gogol, but this never happened and the unidentified woman was instead played by Lizzie Warville.

== Analysis ==
Helena Bassil-Morosow notes that at the start of the film Amasova is shown to be Bond's equal, but this lessens as the film progresses and her emotional dependency on Bond grows. After the two have sex, they enter a new phase of their relationship: "now that he has captured the tough woman with his sexuality, he can demean and control her by making her jealous and relegating her to the status of a boring wife."

In Shaken & Stirred: The Feminism of James Bond, scholar Robert A. Caplen argues that Anya's character "is groundbreaking within the Bond Girl paradigm" because she is "imbued with a plausibility that surpasses her predecessors..." Nevertheless, Caplen observes that Anya's "significant moments of independence and assertiveness are tempered by the constraints inherent in the successful Bondian formula".

== Reception ==
Joshua Rich of Entertainment Weekly listed Amasova as the fifth best Bond girl according to their PopWatch readers, describing her as "Equally at home fighting in the Sahara as rolling in the sheets, she was the Bond-girl response to women’s liberation, in every respect 007’s first modern equal". Kim Morgan of Fandango lists her among the top 10 Bond Girls. About.com ranked Amasova as number seven in their list of best Bond girls. Bond-Girls.net called Amasova "one of the sexiest and most beautiful Bond-Girls...a brand-new type of Bond-Girl".
