= Make Me a Supermodel season 2 =

Make Me a Supermodel
- Season 2
- Starring: Tyson Beckford; Nicole Trunfio; Jenny Shimizu; Perou; Catherine Malandrino; Marlon Stoltzman
- No. of episodes: 13

Release
- Original network: Bravo
- Original release: March 4 – June 3, 2009

Season chronology
- ← Previous; Season 1

Make Me a Supermodel season 2, premiered on March 4, 2009, is the second season of Make Me a Supermodel. It was broadcast on Bravo.

The new season started with higher than expected ratings after a much publicized campaign on blog sites, bus stops, and shopping malls. A casting special aired prior to the second season opener, featuring many models being photographed, critiqued on the runway, and sent away until only the final choices for the season remained. The casting special premiered in February 2009.

Major changes were made the second season, including viewer voting taken out, with the judges deciding who's eliminated and the winner of the entire show. The number of contestants was also increased from 14 to 16 and reduced the final 4 to only 3 finalists in the finale episode. The judging panel was also completely revamped. Former model Jenny Shimizu, along with fashion photographer Perou, one of the judges in the original British version, French fashion designer Catherine Malandrino and international model scout Marlon Stoltzman all joined as judges. Beckford was no longer a judge, and instead became the sole host of the show and the mentor of the male competitors. Australian model Nicole Trunfio replaced Niki Taylor and became the mentor of the female competitors. Lastly, every week, the featured photographer would choose a model they felt worked the photo shoot the best, and that winning model and their pick would get to go on a casting.

The winner of the competition, chosen by the viewers, would receive: a fashion pictorial in Cosmopolitan magazine, a cash prize of $100,000 from Maybelline New York, and a one-year contract with New York Model Management.

The winner of the competition was 18-year-old Branden Rickman from Central Point, Oregon, making him the youngest and first male model to win the show.

== Contestants ==
(ages stated are at time of contest)

Contestant	Age	Hometown	Outcome	Place
Ken Thompson	24	Winterville, North Carolina	Episode 1	16
Chris Cohen	22	Libertyville, Illinois	Episode 2	15
Karen Kelly	22	Ocean Springs, Mississippi	Episode 3	14
Shawn Nishikawa	30	Seattle, Washington	Episode 4	13
CJ Kirkham	18	San Ramon, California	Episode 5	12
Gabriel Zadok Everett	22	Charlotte, North Carolina	Episode 6	11
Laury Prudent	23	Miami, Florida	Episode 7	9-10
Kerryn Johns	24	Russellville, Arkansas	Episode 7	9-10
Colin Steers	21	Charlottesville, Virginia	Episode 8	8
Amanda Crop	21	Banks, Oregon	Episode 9	7
Jordan Condra	21	Tucson, Arizona	Episode 10	6
Salome Steinmann	19	Altamont, Tennessee	Episode 11	5
Mountaha Ayoub	23	Londrina, Brazil	Episode 12	4
Jonathan Waud	26	Southampton, United Kingdom	Episode 13	3
Sandhurst Tacama Miggins	22	Tobago, Trinidad and Tobago	Episode 13	2
Branden Rickman	18	Central Point, Oregon	Episode 13	1

== Pre-show careers ==
- Amanda: Mode Models in Oregon.
- Branden: Image Modeling Development in Oregon.
- Gabriel: MAJOR Models in Milan.
- Jonathan: L.A. Models (Runway Division) & Front Management in Miami.
- Jordan: Ford Models
- Ken: Mint Model Management in New York City & The Block Agency in Nashville.
- Kerryn: Color Agency in Memphis & Dan-Wilhelmina Agency in Memphis.
- Salome: Click Models in Atlanta.

== Contestant elimination progress ==
Model Elimination Progress
Place	Model	Episodes													Episode Title
Place	Model	1	2	3	4	5	6	7	8	9	10	11	12	13	Episode Title
1	Branden	SAFE	WIN	SAFE	HIGH	SAFE	LOW	SAFE	LOW	LOW	HIGH	HIGH	LOW	WINNER	13 - Finale
2	Sandhurst	HIGH	SAFE	HIGH	HIGH	LOW	WIN	HIGH	HIGH	WIN	HIGH	LOW	WIN	OUT	13 - Finale
3	Jonathan	SAFE	HIGH	HIGH	WIN	HIGH	SAFE	SAFE	WIN	HIGH	LOW	WIN	HIGH	OUT	13 - Finale
4	Mountaha	SAFE	SAFE	SAFE	SAFE	LOW	HIGH	SAFE	HIGH	HIGH	WIN	HIGH	OUT		12 - Blowin' Up!
5	Salome	HIGH	SAFE	LOW	SAFE	SAFE	HIGH	WIN	SAFE	LOW	LOW	OUT			11 - Beach Blondes
6	Jordan	WIN	HIGH	SAFE	SAFE	SAFE	HIGH	HIGH	SAFE	LOW	OUT				10 - Rocking and Rolling
7	Amanda	SAFE	SAFE	HIGH	LOW	SAFE	SAFE	LOW	LOW	OUT					9 - Naked Ambition
8	Colin	LOW	LOW	SAFE	LOW	SAFE	SAFE	LOW	OUT						8 - The Simple Life
9-10	Kerryn	SAFE	SAFE	WIN	SAFE	WIN	SAFE	OUT							7 - Ready to Rumble
9-10	Laury	SAFE	SAFE	SAFE	HIGH	SAFE	LOW	OUT							7 - Ready to Rumble
11	Gabriel	SAFE	LOW	LOW	SAFE	LOW	OUT								6 - Take a Deep Breath
12	CJ	SAFE	LOW	SAFE	SAFE	OUT									5 - Menage a Models
13	Shawn	SAFE	SAFE	SAFE	OUT										4 - Mirror, Mirror on the Wall
14	Karen	SAFE	SAFE	OUT											3 - High Wire Act
15	Chris	LOW	OUT												2 - Eye Candy
16	Ken	OUT													1 - Let the Games Begin

Cornflower Blue background and WIN means that the model won the overall week challenge, with the photo shoot and runway combined.
Light Blue background and HIGH means the model had one of the highest scores for that challenge.
Orange background and LOW means the model was in the bottom three and was given another chance by the judges to stay in the competition.
Dark Orange background and LOW means the model was in the bottom two and was given another chance by the judges to stay in the competition.
Pink background and LOW means the model had one of the lowest scores for that challenge, but was not in the bottom.
Tomato background and OUT means the model was in the bottom three, but was not given another chance by the judges, and was sent home.
Yellow Green background and OUT means the model was a runner-up for the competition.
Lime Green background and WINNER means this model won the entire competition, and was chosen by the judges to become a Supermodel.

== Episodes ==
=== Episode guide ===
Episode	Episode Title	Original Air Date	Summary
Casting	"Meet the Models"	February 7, 2009	The Season 2 cast of models is spotlighted.
1	"Let the Games Begin"	March 4, 2009	Sixteen aspiring models arrive in New York City to compete for $100,000, a modeling contract and a fashion pictorial in Cosmopolitan magazine.
2	"Eye Candy"	March 11, 2009	The models must use candy as their inspiration for their next photo shoot.
3	"High Wire Act"	March 18, 2009	The models head back to high school to test their wire work as they capture an authentic sports moment.
4	"Mirror, Mirror on the Wall"	March 25, 2009	The models learn their prize for winning the photo shoot is a trip to Montreal and the opportunity to walk in Montreal Fashion Week.
5	"Menage a Models"	April 1, 2009	The remaining models compete in a military-themed challenge; photographer Kelly Klein serves as a guest judge.
6	"Take a Deep Breath"	April 8, 2009	The models compete in an underwater photo shoot with photographer Howard Schatz; guest judge Alexandre Herchcovitch.
7	"Ready to Rumble"	April 22, 2009	The models flash back to the 1960s with photographer Roxanne Lowit; stylist Rebecca Weinberg serves as a guest judge.
8	"The Simple Life"	April 29, 2009	The models head to the country for a photo shoot with photographer Aliya Naumoff; supermodel Maggie Rizer returns as a guest judge.
9	"Naked Ambition"	May 6, 2009	The seven remaining models carefully choose their accessories for a revealing photo shoot with Bill Diodato.
10	"Rocking and Rolling"	May 13, 2009	The models display music producer Dallas Austin's fashion line and take part in a photo shoot with Patrik Andersson.
11	"Beach Blondes"	May 20, 2009	The models have an outdoor winter photo shoot in New York City; the models wear fashions from the design team The Blonds.
12	"Blowin' Up"	May 27, 2009	The final four models participate in an explosive session with photographer Clay Patrick McBride, then hit the catwalk in tuxedos and evening gowns by designer Catherine Malandrino.
13	"Finale"	June 3, 2009	The final three models take part in two major photo shoots and a catwalk challenge; family members accompany the models to a SoHo art gallery; the judges make a decision.

=== Photo shoots ===
- Episode 1: Let The Games Begin

The models work in pairs regardless of gender, modeling sleepwear outside, in a suspended Plexiglas box.

Featured photographer - Perou

Winner - Salome

Winner's pick - CJ

- Episode 2: Eye Candy

The models act out as various types of candy. Contestants were assigned to represent either pixie sticks, lollipops, chocolate, gumballs, candy canes, rock candy, or sprinkles.

Featured photographer - Suza Scalora

Winner - Jordan

Winner's pick - Mountaha

- Episode 3: High Wire Act

The models are suspended by wires and have to pull off sports action shots, in groups.

Featured photographer - Justin Steele

Winner - Amanda

Winner's pick - Kerryn

- Episode 4: Mirror, Mirror On The Wall...

The photo shoot is all about reflections; the models have to pose with mirrors and evoke different emotions.

Featured photographer - Indira Cesarine

Winners - Amanda & Branden

Winner's pick - Mountaha & Colin

- Episode 5: Menage A Models

The photo shoot was all about capturing a sexual fantasy. The models were portraying military personnel sneaking off to engage in illicit erotic encounters. The models posed in groups of three.

Featured photographer - Joshua Kogan

Winner - Jonathan

Winner's pick - Gabriel

- Episode 6: Take A Deep Breath

The models were challenged to pose underwater, entangled in nets.

Featured photographer - Howard Schatz

Winner - Jordan

Winner's pick - Salome

- Episode 7: Ready To Rumble

The models were paired in a 60s themed, mod photo shoot, where they had to emulate the essence of night life and having a good time.

Featured photographer - Roxanne Lowit

Winner - Salome

Winner's pick - Mountaha

- Episode 8: The Simple Life

The models were sent to a ranch, where they had to pose with farm animals.

Featured photographer - Aliya Naumoff

Winner - Sandhurst

Winner's pick - Branden

- Episode 9: Naked Ambition

The models posed nude, working with one chosen accessory.

Featured photographer - Bill Diodato

Winner - Salome

Winner's pick - Jordan

- Episode 10: Rocking and Rolling

The models were pictured wearing Rowdy clothing, and had to embody the punk, grunge and urban aspects of the brand.

Featured photographer - Patrik Andersson

Winner - Salome

Winner's pick - Mountaha

- Episode 11: Beach Blondes

The models had to capture a hot swimsuit shot in cold weather, while posing with various dead animals from the sea. Sports Illustrated model Jessica Gomes was brought in to individually give the models advice, prior to their shoots.

Featured photographer - Markus Klinko and Indrani, Stylist GK Reid

Winner - Salome

Winner's pick - Mountaha

- Episode 12: Blowin' Up

The models had one chance to capture a shot embodying the "rocker" look, while flames exploded around them in a warehouse at night.

Featured photographer - Clay Patrick McBride

Winner - Sandhurst

Winner's pick - None: All models worked as informal models for Bloomingdale's. As a group prize, each model was rewarded a $2000 shopping spree, while Sandhurst won an additional $2000 for his spree.

- Episode 13: Finale

Featured photographer - Timothy Greenfield-Sanders

Winner - None.

=== Catwalk challenges ===
- Episode 1: The models present clothing from four high fashion designer lines.
- Episode 2: Walking in pairs (or solo in Kerryn's case), and using candy as a prop.
- Episode 3: The models wear sports underwear with wire shoulder pads and must pose like athletes.
- Episode 4: The models are styled as "freaks"; their walks should juxtapose the elegance of their outfit and their shocking make up.
- Episode 5: The models wore cross-over styles usually worn by the opposite gender. The men had to appear masculine, while the women were challenged to maintain femininity, on the runway
- Episode 6: The catwalk was all about embodying specific emotions brought out by the clothing. The female models were dressed in deep scarlet clothing and had to portray sensuality and "fire", while the male models were dressed in white and had to embody "ice", or smoothness.
- Episode 7: The models had a walk-off against their partners from the photo shoot, wearing improv Couture clothing.
- Episode 8: The models wore classic tweed, high society outfits with western themes.
- Episode 9: The catwalk was all about being an art showcase. The models wore form-fitting clothing, while wearing a large, monarch-filled plastic bubble on their heads.
- Episode 10: The models wore bright, playful street outfits, and had the added but optional challenge of walking in Heelys (which all of the models accepted).
- Episode 11: The models modeled two looks designed by celebrity designer The Blonds: high glamour and goth. The models were expected to create a character and bring these characters to life.
- Episode 12: The models wore high class looks. The male models hit the catwalk in tuxedos and were challenged to embody James Bond, while Mountaha walked in an evening gown by designer and judge Catherine Malandrino.

== Post-show careers ==
- Branden: is currently signed with New York Model Management in New York, Wilhelmina Models in Los Angeles and Image Modeling Development in Medford.
- Jonathan: is currently signed with Nous Model Management in Los Angeles and L.A. Model Management in Los Angeles. He has since signed a job with Forever 21, appearing in the first issue of Forever 21 magazine.
- Mountaha: is currently signed with New York Model Management in New York.
- Salome: is currently signed with Click Models in Atlanta.
- Jordan: is currently signed with Ford Models in Arizona and APM Model Management in New York.
- Amanda: did not pursue a modeling career after the show.
- Colin: is currently signed with Basic Model Management in New York.
- Ken: is currently signed with PGK Men in New York, The Block Agency in Nashville, and Fuse Models in Raleigh, NC.

Preceded by Season 1	Make Me a Supermodel; Season 2	Succeeded by None
