= Make Me a Supermodel =

Make Me a Supermodel may refer to:

- Make Me a Supermodel (British TV series), the original British version aired on Five
- Make Me a Supermodel (American TV series), the American version on Bravo (US TV channel)
  - Make Me a Supermodel (season 1)
  - Make Me a Supermodel (season 2)
- Make Me a Supermodel (Australian TV series), the Australian version on the Seven Network
