= Make Me a Supermodel (American TV series) =

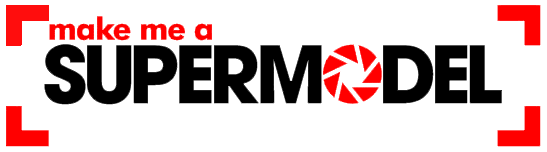
- Genre: Fashion
- Starring: Tyson Beckford; Niki Taylor; Jennifer Starr; Nicole Trunfio
- Country of origin: United States
- Original language: English
- No. of series: 2
- No. of episodes: 30 (including a special)

Production
- Running time: 60 minutes
- Production company: Tiger Aspect Productions

Original release
- Network: Bravo
- Release: January 2, 2008 – June 3, 2009

Related
- Make Me a Supermodel (British TV series); Make Me a Supermodel (Australian TV series)

Make Me a Supermodel is an American reality television modeling competition series based on the British reality series of the same name. Following an audition preview on January 2, 2008, the series premiered January 10, 2008, on the cable television network Bravo.

== Overview ==
For season 1, the bottom three contestants were selected at the end of each episode and viewers of the show determine which of the three contestants will not continue in the competition with the judges picking the winner of the episode; for the final episode, the viewers determined the winner. For season 2, viewer participation was removed, and all model eliminations and winners were selected by the judges.

The first season was hosted by supermodels Tyson Beckford and Niki Taylor and judged by fashion casting director Jennifer Starr and model agent Cory Bautista. The second season premiered on March 4, 2009, with Beckford returning as the sole host. Nicole Trunfio replaced Taylor and act as a mentor to the female contestants, while the judging panel will be completely revamped. The show features top photographers such as Roxanne Lowit, Markus Klinko & Indrani, Howard Schatz, and Suza Scalora.

== Seasons ==
Season	Premiere date	Winner	Runner-Up	Contestants (in order of elimination)	Number of contestants
1	2 January 2008	Holly Kiser	Ronnie Kroell	Sarah Swartz, Dominic Prietto, Aryn Livingston, Jay McGee, Katy Caswell, Stephanie Bulger, Jacki Hydock, Frankie Godoy, Casey Skinner, Shannon Pallay, Perry Ullmann & Ben DiChiara	14
2	7 February 2009	Branden Rickman	Sandhurst Miggins	Ken Thompson, Chris Cohen, Karen Kelly, Shawn Nishikawa, CJ Kirkham, Gabriel Zadok Everett, Kerryn Johns & Laury Prudent, Colin Steers, Amanda Crop, Jordan Condra, Salome Steinmann, Mountaha Ayoub, Jonathan Waud	16

== Judges ==
Season 1
Cory Bautista
Jennifer Starr
Tyson Beckford
Niki Taylor

Season 2
Marlon Stoltzman
Catherine Malandrino
Perou
Jenny Shimizu

== Sponsors ==
Season 1
GQ Magazine
New York Model Management

Season 2
New York Model Management
Cosmopolitan
Maybelline New York
Garnier Fructis

== See also ==
- America's Next Top Model (2003)
- America's Most Smartest Model (2007)
