= Make Me a Supermodel season 1 =

Make Me a Supermodel
- Season 1
- Starring: Tyson Beckford; Niki Taylor; Jennifer Starr; Cory Bautista
- No. of episodes: 13

Release
- Original network: Bravo
- Original release: January 2 – April 3, 2008

Season chronology
- Next → Season 2

Season 1 of Make Me a Supermodel, an American reality television series based on the British series of the same name, premiered on January 10, 2008, on the Bravo television network.

Casting director Jennifer Starr joined the season 1 cast along with Cory Bautista, director of New York Model Management, as judges. Tyson Beckford and Niki Taylor played as both judges and the hosts of the show.

A casting special aired prior to the season opener on January 2, 2008, featuring many models being photographed, critiqued on the runway, and sent away until only the final choices for the season remained.

The winner of the competition, chosen by the viewers, would receive: a fashion pictorial in GQ Magazine, a cash prize of $100,000, and a one-year contract with New York Model Management.

The winner of the competition was 21-year-old Holly Kiser from Coeburn, Virginia.

== Contestants ==
Ages stated are at time of contest.

Contestant	Age	Hometown	Occupation	Outcome	Place
Sarah Swartz	20	Miami, Florida	Student	Episode 1	14
Dominic Prietto	25	Dana Point, California	Skimboarder/DJ	Episode 2	13
Aryn Livingston	20	Lowndesboro, Alabama	Sales Associate	Episode 3	12
Jay McGee	22	Roswell, Georgia	Mechanic	Episode 4	11
Katy Caswell	21	Auburn, Alabama	Claims Clerk	Episode 5	10
Stephanie Bulger	21	Plano, Texas	Student	Episode 6	9
Jacki Hydock	21	Harlem, New York	Waitress	Episode 7	8
Frankie Godoy	20	Miami, Florida	Student/Valet Parker	Episode 8	7
Casey Skinner	19	Dunwoody, Georgia	Sales Associate	Episode 9	6
Shannon Pallay	22	Plantation, Florida	Waitress	Episode 10	5
Perry Ullmann †	22	Phoenix, Arizona	Waiter	Episode 13	3-4
Ben DiChiara	23	Nashville, Tennessee	Prison Guard	Episode 13	3-4
Ronnie Kroell	25	Chicago, Illinois	Student	Episode 13	2
Holly Kiser	21	Coeburn, Virginia	Former Student	Episode 13	1

== Contestant elimination progress ==
- Note: The bottom three contestants chosen for the public vote are shown at the end of each episode, and the eliminated model is shown at the beginning of the following episode.

Model Elimination Progress
Place	Model	Episodes													Episode Title
Place	Model	1	2	3	4	5	6	7	8	9	10	11	13		Episode Title
1	Holly	WIN	SAFE	LOW	HIGH	HIGH	HIGH	LOW	WIN	WIN	WIN	FINALIST	SAFE	WIN	13 - "Finale, Part 2"
2	Ronnie	SAFE	HIGH	SAFE	SAFE	LOW	LOW	WIN	HIGH	LOW	LOW	FINALIST	SAFE	OUT	13 - "Finale, Part 2"
3-4	Ben	SAFE	LOW	SAFE	LOW	WIN	SAFE	LOW	LOW	LOW	HIGH	FINALIST	OUT		13 - "Finale, Part 2"
3-4	Perry	HIGH	SAFE	WIN	SAFE	SAFE	HIGH	LOW	HIGH	LOW	LOW	FINALIST	OUT		13 - "Finale, Part 2"
5	Shannon	HIGH	SAFE	HIGH	HIGH	SAFE	WIN	LOW	LOW	HIGH	OUT				10 - "The Big Easy... New Orleans"
6	Casey	SAFE	SAFE	HIGH	LOW	HIGH	LOW	HIGH	LOW	OUT					9 - "Brand Ambassadors"
7	Frankie	SAFE	SAFE	LOW	SAFE	LOW	LOW	HIGH	OUT						8 - "A Snowy Weekend Getaway"
8	Jacki	LOW	WIN	SAFE	SAFE	LOW	SAFE	OUT							7 - "Into the Wild"
9	Stephanie	SAFE	SAFE	SAFE	WIN	SAFE	OUT								6 - "Acting Up"
10	Katy	LOW	LOW	SAFE	LOW	OUT									5 - "New York Fashion Week"
11	Jay	SAFE	LOW	LOW	OUT										4 - "Naked Art"
12	Aryn	SAFE	HIGH	OUT											3 - "Sexual Chemistry"
13	Dominic	LOW	OUT												2 - "Hanging From the Rafters"
14	Sarah	OUT													1 - "Welcome to New York"

Cornflower blue background and "WIN" means the model won the challenge.
Light blue background and "HIGH" means the model had one of the highest scores for that challenge.
Pink background and "LOW" means the model had one of the lowest scores for that challenge, but was not in the bottom three.
Orange background and "LOW" means the model was in the bottom three, and may have been given another chance by America to stay in the competition.
Dark orange background and "LOW" means the model was in the bottom two, and may have been given another chance by America to stay in the competition.
Tomato background and "OUT" means the model was in the bottom three, but was not given another chance by America, and was sent home.
Light green background and "FINALIST" means the Final 4 were placed in the hands of America to make one of the four a supermodel.
Yellow Green background and "OUT" means the model was a runner-up for the competition.
Lime Green background and "WINNER" means the model won the entire competition, and was voted by America to become a supermodel.

Note: In Episode 10, only two people were in the bottom. Episode 12 was a reunion for the top four to look back with the eliminated contestants.

== Episodes ==
=== Photo shoots ===
- Episode 1: Summer clothes in frigid weather in Times Square, New York City.
- Episode 2: Suits and dresses while fitted with harnesses and suspended from the ceiling.
- Episode 3: Sexual chemistry involving pairs, regardless of gender.
- Episode 4: A ten-minute still posing as nude models for an art class in Parsons; group shots with one male among a group of females, and vice versa; then, getting full body paint to act as a group for a living art installation.
- Episode 5: There were no photo shoots for the week, as the episode concentrated on catwalk in New York Fashion Week.
- Episode 6: The use of emotions and body language to act out a scene; done in groups of three.
- Episode 7: Submerged in a tank of water, and posing with an albino snake.
- Episode 8: A winter-themed photo shoot done in the snow, emphasizing speed, action, and motion; done in groups of twos or threes.
- Episode 9: Instead of an actual photo shoot, the models participated in a sensual online video lookbook for Marithé + François Girbaud, with each scene done in a pair or a group of three; then, acting as brand ambassadors for the label Bloomingdales, at a customer luncheon.
- Episode 10: The models were flown off to New Orleans and were assigned with a high fashion photo shoot with a dramatic Goth theme, set in a local cemetery.
- Episode 11: For their final photo assignment, the models took a nude photo session with Matthew Rolston, and each one represented a different classical element. Holly was fire, Perry was water, Ronnie was earth, and Ben was air. The photos were then displayed in a gallery to showcase the models' performances to the judges and the public.
- Episode 13: Though not an actual photo assignment, the models spent their final day going on New York designer go-sees.

=== Catwalk challenges ===
- Episode 1: Swimwear, with two men and two women wearing thongs.
- Episode 2: Wearing designs from Heatherette, and embodying fun and attitude.
- Episode 3: Walking in pairs with their partner in the Sexual Chemistry photo shoot, wearing a mix of equestrian and S&M clothing.
- Episode 4: Wearing high fashion from British designers, posing as statues at each end of the runway.
- Episode 5: The contestants were given runway assignments in New York Fashion Week. This is separate from the "New York downtown grunge" catwalk challenge they did during judging.
- Episode 6: Walking in pairs (or solo in Jacki's case), while performing a story based on characters they have selected.
- Episode 7: Donning enormous quirky headpieces, and walking down the runway with an animal, such as sheep, pigs, ducks, peacocks, and dogs.
- Episode 8: Walking down the runway leading to a turntable at the end, and posing once after each turntable rotation, three times, before departing the turntable.
- Episode 9: Wearing two sophisticated vintage looks (therefore doing the catwalk twice), and capturing the timeless elegance of both looks from each of their respective eras.
- Episode 10: The models choreographed their own fashion show with a gothic and dark theme, while each model portrayed a different character in the plot of a story. Each model walked multiple times, with props.
- Episode 11: For their final catwalk assignment, the models displayed three looks/styles on the runway: underwear/sexy, preppy/fun, and formal/somber. Project Runway season 4 winner Christian Siriano makes a special guest appearance as the models' runway coach and stylist, and created a special dress for Holly to wear on the runway, as her "fun" look.
- Episode 13: For their farewell runway walk before the announcement of the season winner, the boys wore metallic-colored suits while Holly was dressed as a "couture butterfly" in a red ball gown.

== Post-show careers ==
- Stephanie Bulger signed with New York Model Management - Division: nym2 - Women, and L.A. Models.
- Katy Caswell signed with Chi-Town Modeling Agency.
- Ben DiChiara signed with New York Model Management - Division: Men. He left the industry to work in the Nashville Fire Department. He and his wife's expected their first baby was born in October 2009.
- Frankie Godoy signed with Why Not Model Agency in Milan, Italy - Division: Man, Out of Town.
- Jacki Hydock signed with Bloom Model Management - Division: Women, Request Model Management - Division: Women.
- Holly Kiser signed with New York Model Management - Division: Women, L.A. Model Management - Division: Women, Connected Models in Hong Kong, China - Division: Women, and Red Eleven - Division: Women
- Ronnie Kroell signed with New York Model Management - Division: Men. He announced his intention to participate in the Presidential Election in 2020.
- Aryn Livingston signed with New York Model Management - Division: nym2 - Women.
- Jay McGee signed with MC2 Model Management in Miami, D1 Models in London (as Jerry McGee), and Click Model Management in Atlanta.
- Shannon Pallay signed with New York Model Management - Division: Women.
- Dominic Prietto signed with Imodel and talent. - Division: i Men L.A.
- Casey Skinner signed with New York Model Management - Division: Men.
- Perry Ullmann signed with New York Model Management - Division: Men, and L.A. Model Management - Division: Men. He died the 15th January 2021.

Preceded by None	Make Me a Supermodel; Season 1	Succeeded by Season 2
