= The Face Australia season 1 =

The Face Australia
- Season 1
- Promotional poster
- No. of episodes: 8

Release
- Original network: Fox8
- Original release: 18 March – 6 May 2014

The Face Australia Season 1 is an Australian reality television modelling competition series, based upon the American version with the same format. This series follows three supermodel coaches, Cheyenne Tozzi, Naomi Campbell, and Nicole Trunfio as they compete with each other to find 'the face' of Fresh Effects, Olay. The series premiered on 18 March 2014, on Fox8.

== Casting ==
All applicants attempting to enter the competition were required to be female and be over the age of 18 or under the age 30 as of 1 November 2013. Applying contestants were also required to meet the minimum height requirement of 172 cm. Past experience as a model was not a requisite. Those with experience as a model could not have been in any national campaign within previous five years before applying. The deadline for all applications was 22 September 2013.

== Contestants ==
(ages stated are at start of filming)

Contestant	Age	Height	Hometown	Model Coach	Finish	Rank
Natalie Roser	23	1.75 m (5 ft 9 in)	Sydney	Cheyenne	Episode 2	12
Susan Yovan	23	1.80 m (5 ft 11 in)	Juba, South Sudan	Nicole	Episode 3	11 (quit)
Shenika Rule	24	1.74 m (5 ft 8 1/2 in)	Perth	Nicole	Episode 3	10
Melise Williams	19	1.77 m (5 ft 9 1/2 in)	Sydney	Nicole	Episode 4	9
Anouska Freedman	18	1.74 m (5 ft 8 1/2 in)	Perth	Nicole	Episode 5	8
Brittaney Johnston	20	1.77 m (5 ft 9 1/2 in)	Brisbane	Naomi	Episode 6	7
Nikolina Kovacevic	19	1.75 m (5 ft 9 in)	Sydney	Cheyenne	Episode 7	6
Chantal Monaghan	18	1.80 m (5 ft 11 in)	Brisbane	Naomi	Episode 8	5-4
Ruth Willmer	20	1.72 m (5 ft 7 1/2 in)	Albany	Naomi	Episode 8	5-4
Yaya Deng	19	1.77 m (5 ft 9 1/2 in)	Sydney	Cheyenne	Episode 8	3-2
Sarah Tilleke	18	1.80 m (5 ft 11 in)	Perth	Naomi	Episode 8	3-2
Olivia Donaldson	19	1.76 m (5 ft 9 1/2 in)	Perth	Cheyenne	Episode 8	1

== Episodes ==
=== Episode 1: 24 Become 12 ===
First aired 18 March 2014

Twenty four model hopefuls arrive at the casting of their lives. There they meet the model mentors Cheyenne Tozzi, Naomi Campbell, and Nicole Trunfio, who will each assemble a group of four models to be a part of their team. After half of the contestants are gobbled up in two separate eliminations, the final twelve prepare to compete to become the new face of Olay.

=== Episode 2: Game On! ===
First aired 25 March 2014

Naomi watches the twelve finalists perform in their first test shoot challenge, where they must pose with miscellaneous items in order to win a Givenchy handbag. For the campaign, the teams are styled by their mentors for a Marie Claire editorial. One of the mentors is not pleased by the outcome of the first elimination, and decides to confront Naomi.

- Winning coach and team: Naomi Campbell
- Bottom two: Natalie Roser & Shenika Rule
- Eliminated: Natalie Roser
- Special Guests: Jackie Frank

=== Episode 3: Circus Circus ===
First aired 1 April 2014

The remaining eleven models take part in a 'who wore it better' test shoot overseen by Cheyenne. The girls are later taken to a circus, where they learn that they will have to perform in a Max Factor commercial portraying different roles. In a shocking turn of events, one of the models is forced to withdraw from the competition. After the elimination, one of the teams is reduced to just two girls.

- Winning coach and team: Cheyenne Tozzi
- Bottom two: Brittaney Johnston & Shenika Rule
- Eliminated: Shenika Rule
- Quit: Susan Yovan

=== Episode 4: Movement and Fashion ===
First aired 8 April 2014

For the challenge, the models must jump on a trampoline to create dynamic body shapes. The winner receives a $1,000 shopping voucher from G Star, who also provides the clothes for the challenge. The girls must later pose with their teams in a sporty Stylerunner photo shoot to create an edgy online advertisement for the brand's website. It's one girls' moment on top of the sun as she is showered with praise from both the client, and her team. Team Nicole receives yet another blow, and Anouska becomes the sole member of her team.

- Winning coach and team: Naomi Campbell
- Bottom two: Olivia Donaldson & Melise Williams
- Eliminated: Melise Williams
- Special Guests: Sali Stevanja, Julie Stevanja

=== Episode 5: Walk the Walk ===
First aired 15 April 2014

The models are given two minutes to run back stage, undress, and re-dress into a runway outfit. The winner of the challenge receives a collection from ASOS, along with a feature on Naomi Campbell's website. The contestants later face their biggest campaign yet; walking down 250 steps for a Steven Khalil wedding dress runway show at the Sydney Opera House in front of a crowd of 500 people. The best performing contestants are given the opportunity to front Khalil's next online campaign. Drama ensues after one team is obliterated following elimination.

- Winning coach and team: Naomi Campbell
- Bottom two: Yaya Deng & Anouska Freedman
- Eliminated: Anouska Freedman
- Eliminated Mentor: Nicole Trunfio
- Special Guests: Gail Elliott, Steven Khalil

=== Episode 6: Modelling with Men ===
First aired 22 April 2014

The models are challenged to a steamy photo shoot session with a male model while wearing lingerie from Dita Von Tesse's new line. During the campaign, the girls compete for the opportunity of being featured in the new Le Specs 2014 summer lookbook. Each group is allotted twenty minutes to take a group shot and one individual picture for each team member. With only two teams left in the competition, the losing mentor must nominate two of her models for elimination.

- Winning coach and team: Cheyenne Tozzi
- Bottom two: Brittaney Johnston & Chantal Monaghan
- Eliminated: Brittaney Johnston
- Special Guests: Jordan Coulter, Hamish Tame, Lana Rowil

=== Episode 7: The Race to the Final ===
First aired 29 April 2014

It's the week of the semi-final, and the remaining six contestants face the last test shoot of the series. In it, they are asked to portray a wide range of emotions. For the final campaign, the girls are introduced to their client, Lexus Brand Ambassador Yolande Waldock. It is explained that each model will be tied to a cable that will enable them to jump over their partner for the shoot: a brand new Lexus CT 200h. The tight race between the teams sways if favor of team Naomi, and for the first time since the beginning of the series, team Cheyenne loses another member.

- Winning coach and team: Naomi Campbell
- Bottom two: Yaya Deng & Nikolina Kovacevic
- Eliminated: Nikolina Kovacevic
- Special Guests: Yolande Waldock

=== Episode 8: Final Walk ===
First aired 6 May 2014

- Final Five: Yaya Deng & Sarah Tilleke & Olivia Donaldson & Ruth Willmer & Chantal Monaghan
- Eliminated: Ruth Willmer & Chantal Monaghan
- Final three Yaya Deng & Sarah Tilleke & Olivia Donaldson
- The Face Australia: Olivia Donaldson
- Winning coach and team: Cheyenne Tozzi
- Featured Photographer: Jez Smith
- Special Guests: Lauren Young, Alex Noonan, Emma Hogan, Zac Posen

== Summaries ==
=== Elimination table ===
Team Cheyenne	Team Naomi	Team Nicole

Place	Contestant	Episodes								
Place	Contestant	1	2	3	4	5	6	7	8	
1	Olivia	IN	IN	WIN	LOW	IN	WIN	IN	IN	WINNER
2-3	Sarah	IN	WIN	IN	WIN	WIN	IN	WIN	IN	RUNNER-UP
2-3	Yaya	IN	IN	WIN	IN	LOW	WIN	LOW	IN	RUNNER-UP
4-5	Ruth	IN	WIN	IN	WIN	WIN	IN	WIN	OUT	
4-5	Chantal	IN	WIN	IN	WIN	WIN	LOW	WIN	OUT	
6	Nikolina	IN	IN	WIN	IN	IN	WIN	OUT		
7	Brittaney	IN	WIN	LOW	WIN	WIN	OUT			
8	Anouska	IN	IN	IN	IN	OUT				
9	Melise	IN	IN	IN	OUT					
10	Shenika	IN	LOW	OUT						
11	Susan	IN	IN	QUIT						
12	Natalie	IN	OUT							

The contestant was part of the winning team for the episode.
The contestant was at risk of elimination.
The contestant was eliminated from the competition.
The contestant withdrew from the competition.
The contestant was a Runner-Up.
The contestant won The Face.

- Episode 1 was the casting episode. The final twelve were divided into individual teams of four as they were selected.
- In Episode 3, Susan withdrew from the competition after learning that she was pregnant ^^{a}
- In Episode 5, Anouska, who was the last standing member in Nicole's team, was eliminated. Nicole was automatically disqualified as a result of having no models left to compete.
- In Episodes 6 and 7, since the competition was down to two teams, the losing coach had to nominate two girls for elimination.
- In Episode 7, the winning team for the campaign was determined by the total combined number of points allotted to each girl for her performance. Although Team Naomi had the highest combined score, Team Cheyenne's Olivia was scored the highest overall by the client despite being on the losing team.^^{a}
- In Episode 8, Olivia, Sarah, and Yaya were put through to the final runway show while Chantal and Ruth were eliminated.

=== Campaigns ===
- Episode 1: Natural Beauty Shots; Self Administered 'Transformations' (Casting)
- Episode 2: Marie Claire Editorial
- Episode 3: Max Factor Commercials in a Circus.
- Episode 4: Stylerunner Photo Shoot
- Episode 5: Steven Khalil Runway Show at the Sydney Opera House
- Episode 6: Le Specs lookbook with Male Models
- Episode 7: Leaping Over a Lexus CT 200h
- Episode 8: Olay Beauty Shots for Fresh Effects
