= Sandhurst Tacama Miggins =

Tobagonian fashion model (born 1986)

- Born: April 24, 1986 (age 40); Tobago
- Modeling information
- Height: 6 ft 5 in (196 cm)
- Hair color: Black
- Eye color: Dark Brown
- Agency: New York Model Management

Sandhurst Tacama Miggins (born April 24, 1986), is a Tobagonian fashion model best known as a contestant and first runner-up of the second season of the show Make Me a Supermodel.

== Early life ==
Miggins was born on April 24, 1986 on the island of Tobago in Trinidad and Tobago. His mother is Deborah Moore-Miggins, a lawyer and former Senator in Trinidad and Tobago. Miggins was named after the Royal Military Academy Sandhurst.

Miggins spent his later teen years in Fort Lauderdale, Florida, where he was an avid dancer. He has taken 12 years of ballroom dance, and has also studied ballet, tap, modern, and African dance forms. He studied ballet at the prestigious Rock School for Dance Education in Pennsylvania.

He later relocated to Philadelphia to attend Temple University and major in public relations. He started his career in modeling in 2008, when he was picked out of a crowd by Dianne Hunt of Radical Designs during Trinidad and Tobago's inaugural Fashion Week, and was asked to walk in a runway show.

== Make Me a Supermodel ==
Sandhurst was 22 years old when he appeared on the second season of Bravo's reality competition show Make Me a Supermodel. At six feet three inches tall, he was literally head and shoulders over many of the 15 other competitors. He won three episodes and was in the top three in 11 out of 13 weeks. In one episode, models were asked to choose an accessory and then photographed wearing only that. Miggins' photo — in which he is crouched like a runner on his mark, leather gloves his only adornment — is a sleek testimony to his years of classical dance training. Ironically, although dancing gave him one of the most toned bodies on the show, he has had to give up dancing to pursue his dream of being a professional model. Slender by Caribbean standards, Miggins' quadriceps and gluteus maximus are bulky for a model, and dance makes them bigger. He placed second on the show.

== Career ==
After appearing on Make Me A Supermodel, Miggins signed with New York Model Management in New York City. He walked for various designers in Brooklyn's "Bikini Under the Bridge" fashion show in 2008, organised by esteemed Caribbean fashion editor Walter Greene. He was photographed by noted Caribbean photographer Calvin French for the July 2008 issue of Caribbean Belle Magazine. Miggins was set to appear in the 2009 Victoria's Secret Fashion Show; however, his role as back-stage commentary was cut from the final show. On June 20, 2009, Miggins modeled for the Paul Mitchell Esani Institute. He worked in the events preceding the Trinidad and Tobago Carnival 2010 as a model and promoter for Antilia, a Caribbean public relations and event planning firm. He remains a Trinidad and Tobago Carnival fixture. In February 2010 Miggins modeled in a photo shoot directed by Jonathan Mannion in Trinidad and Tobago. He is still a fixture at Fashion Week Trinidad and Tobago, regularly walking for Millhouse Mens, Meiling and Radical Designs. He co-hosted Fashion Week Trinidad and Tobago 2010 alongside Jamaican-American supermodel Tyson Beckford. Miggins was the feature guest model for Anthony Reid for Meiling at Fashion Week Trinidad and Tobago 2010.

Miggins landed a minor acting role as a photographer in a Martin Scorsese-directed commercial for Chanel, set to premiere in September 2010.

Tyson Beckford, host/judge of Make Me A Supermodel, continues to serve as one of Miggins' mentors.

According to Fashion Week Trinidad and Tobago coverage, Miggins plans to relocate to Europe.
