= BikiniLuxe =

American online clothing retailer

Bikini Luxe
- Type: Private
- Industry: Fashion
- Founded: 2013
- Founder: Candice Galek (CEO)
- Defunct: 2020
- Fate: Closed down
- Headquarters: Miami, Florida, U.S.
- Area served: Worldwide
- Products: Swimwear
- Website: www.bikiniluxe.com

Bikini Luxe was an American online retailer that specializes in fashion clothing, swimwear, and accessories for young women. The company was founded in 2013 by Candice Galek and was based in Miami, Florida. The company stopped selling items on its website in 2020.

Prior to its closure, the retailer stocked over 2,500 bikinis and one-piece swimsuits along with a collection of designer clothing items and accessories, such as activewear, jewelry, and dresses.

The company made headlines in the spring of 2016 after founder and CEO, Candice Galek, posted controversial photos on her LinkedIn profile.

== History ==
Bikini Luxe was founded in 2013 by Candice Galek in her Miami Beach living room. The website was opened to the public in June 2014. The company initially focused on swimwear brands in the South Florida region but soon expanded to include brands worldwide. The company earned some early success largely due to social media and word-of-mouth marketing. In late 2014, Bikini Luxe customers began tagging Bikini Luxe in their social media posts. The company's Wanelo page had earned around 30,000 followers by May 2015. By February 2016, the Bikini Luxe had accrued around 5 million impressions on Pinterest.

In March 2016, founder and CEO, Candice Galek, posted an image of Miss Universe contender, Natalie Roser, in a bikini on the business networking service, LinkedIn. The post was titled, "Is This Appropriate For LinkedIn?" The image went viral soon after because of its controversial nature and garnered 50,000 views, 500 comments, and an additional 30,000 followers. At that time, the company's social media following (including on sites like Facebook and Instagram) had reached around 250,000 worldwide. Bikini Luxe also employs around 40 individuals throughout the world.

The site was closed in spring 2020. The Brazilian Bikini Shop company made a formal offer to Candice Galek to take over the website, but there was no response.

== Collections ==
Bikini Luxe carried around 2,500 bikinis and one-piece swimsuits along with a variety of designer clothing and accessories including jewelry, dresses, activewear, and resort wear. Some brands included were Agua Bendita, Montce, Peixoto, Luli Fama, Sauvage, Shahida Parides, Tai Jewelry, Michi, and others. The company launched its Sauvage Resort collection in 2016 and launched a limited edition of Shahida Parides dresses in 2015.
