= Jennifer Starr =

American casting director

Jennifer Starr is an American casting director. She has cast models for ad campaigns for Calvin Klein, Versace, Banana Republic, Dolce & Gabbana, Ralph Lauren and The Gap.

== Early life and education ==
Starr grew up in Miami, Florida. When she was 17 she met the location director of the series Miami Vice and started finding locations for the show. A year later, fashion photographer Bruce Weber asked her to find private homes for a photo shoot for the Calvin Klein perfume Obsession. Starr stayed on as a production assistant until leaving for college.

== Career ==
After college Starr was hired by Bruce Weber as a casting director. Weber later introduced Starr to Calvin Klein. Starr then worked with Klein until 2012 to cast his campaigns and contract models. She also worked for Steven Meisel.

In 1996 Richard Avedon asked Starr to cast women for the 1997 edition of his Pirelli Calendar titled Women of the World. Starr went on to cast the next 19 Pirelli Calendars, working with photographers Peter Beard and Peter Lindbergh.

In 1999 Starr was asked by Yvonne Force to cast models for Vanessa Beecroft's performance at the Guggenheim Museum SoHo called SHOW, where 15 women were instructed to stand naked in the rotunda of the Guggenheim Museum for two and a half hours.

In 2008 Starr was a judge on season 1 of the Bravo TV show Make Me a Super Model.

In early 2018 Starr cast Lizzo in ModCloth's "say it louder" campaign, promoting body inclusivity and celebrating individuality.
