= Nicole Trunfio =

Australian model (born 1985)

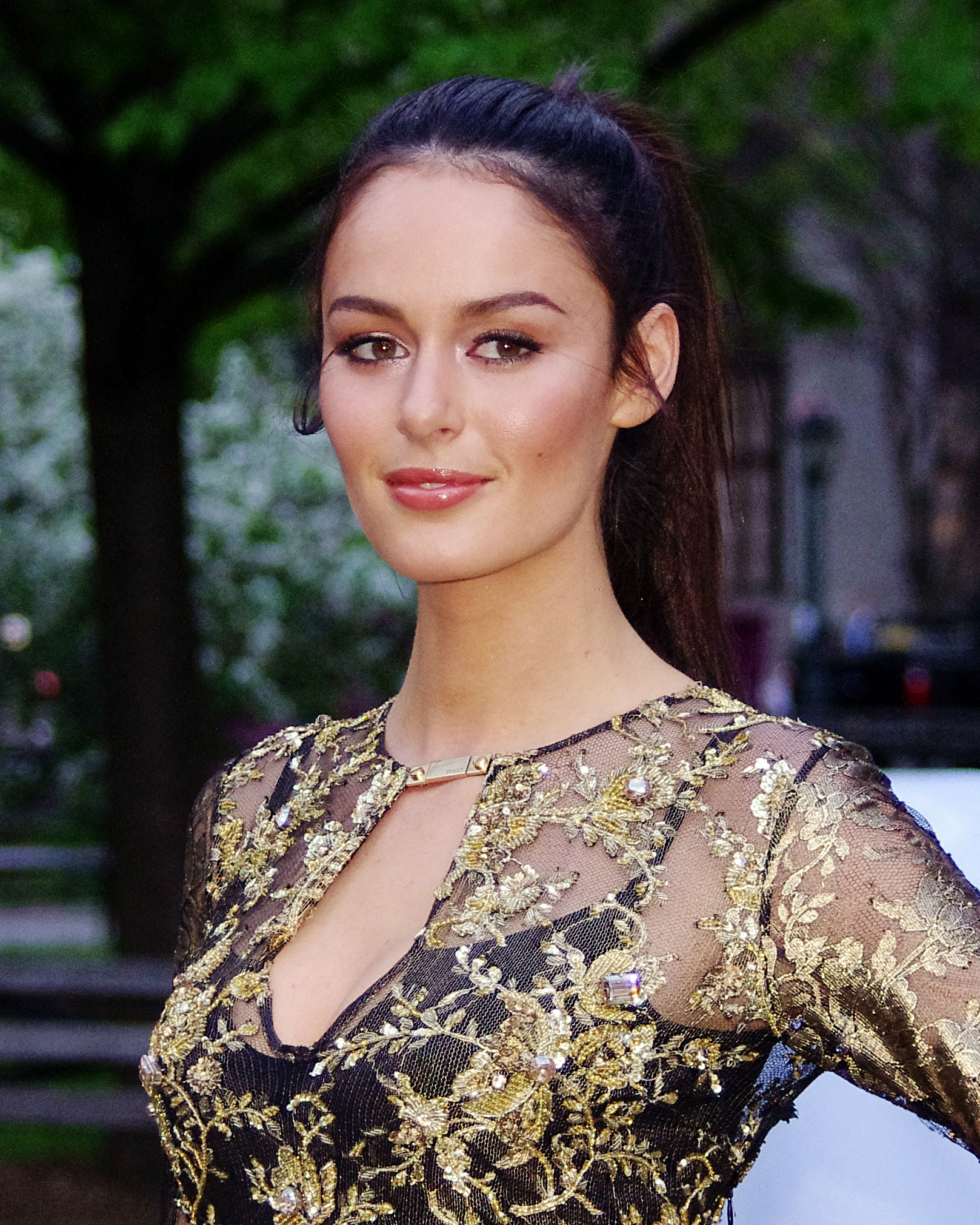
- Trunfio in 2012
- Born: 16 March 1985 (age 41); Merredin, Western Australia,
- Occupation: Model
- Years active: 2002–present
- Spouse: Gary Clark Jr. (m. 2016)
- Children: 3
- Modeling information
- Height: 1.78 m (5 ft 10 in)
- Hair color: Dark brown
- Eye color: Maroon
- Agency: IMG Models; Iconic Management (Berlin)

Nicole Trunfio (born 16 March 1985) is an Australian model.

== Early life ==
Trunfio was born on 16 March 1985 in Merredin, Western Australia, to father Giuseppe and mother Kim. She is the youngest of three siblings. Her father was of Italian descent and she says her Italian upbringing made her feel "more Italian than Australian growing up". Her mother is Australian. She would ride dirt bikes and make Italian sausage, pasta sauce and wine with her grandparents. Trunfio grew up poor but never felt poor as "there was always food on the table and love in the household". When she was a child, her father played music around the house and "had every instrument around". She played piano growing up.

Trunfio attended St Mary's Primary School in Merredin, Western Australia. Later, she attended Parkfield Primary, and finally, attended Australind Senior High School in Australind, Western Australia.

Sixteen-year-old Trunfio worked at Australian supermarket Coles, packing shelves before she dropped out of school in Year 11 to move to New York City after winning a modelling competition, with only $5,000 in her bank account. She was going to come back to Australia and study law at university after she was told that a model had a five-year shelf life. However, she studied acting in New York City for three years and also attended the National Institute of Dramatic Art (NIDA) in Sydney.

== Career ==
Trunfio was the winner of the third installment of the Australian television series Supermodel of Australia in 2002 and came second in the international version Supermodel of the World.

She has modelled for various Australian as well as international designers including Chanel, Dolce & Gabbana, Versace, Christian Dior, Gucci, Fendi, Missoni, Roberto Cavalli, Vivienne Westwood, Valentino, Victoria's Secret, Sweetface and Neiman Marcus. She has appeared in campaigns for Karl Lagerfeld, D&G, Sonia Rykiel, Lacoste, Sisley, Anne Taylor, BCBG Max Azria, Chadwick's and Guess. Trunfio has worked with photographers such as Richard Avedon for Kenneth Cole campaign, Patrick Demarchelier for Harpers Bazaar, Steven Klein for D&G campaign, Peter Lindbergh for Italian Vogue, Terry Richardson for British Vogue, Greg Kadel, Melvin Sokosky, Russell James, and is the current face of Ulta.

In 2006, Trunfio began several years of studying acting in New York City at Stella Adler Studio. She attended NIDA, and was featured in the Australian movie Two Fists, One Heart, playing the role of Italian temptress Jessica.

She served as a mentor for the female models in the second season of the American version of Make Me a Supermodel. She was also a mentor for one of the three teams on the first season of The Face Australia. Trunfio replaced Miranda Kerr as the face of David Jones' winter 2011 launch.

Trunfio is represented by IMG Models in New York City, Iconic Management in Berlin and Viviens Model Management in Australia.

=== Modelling ===
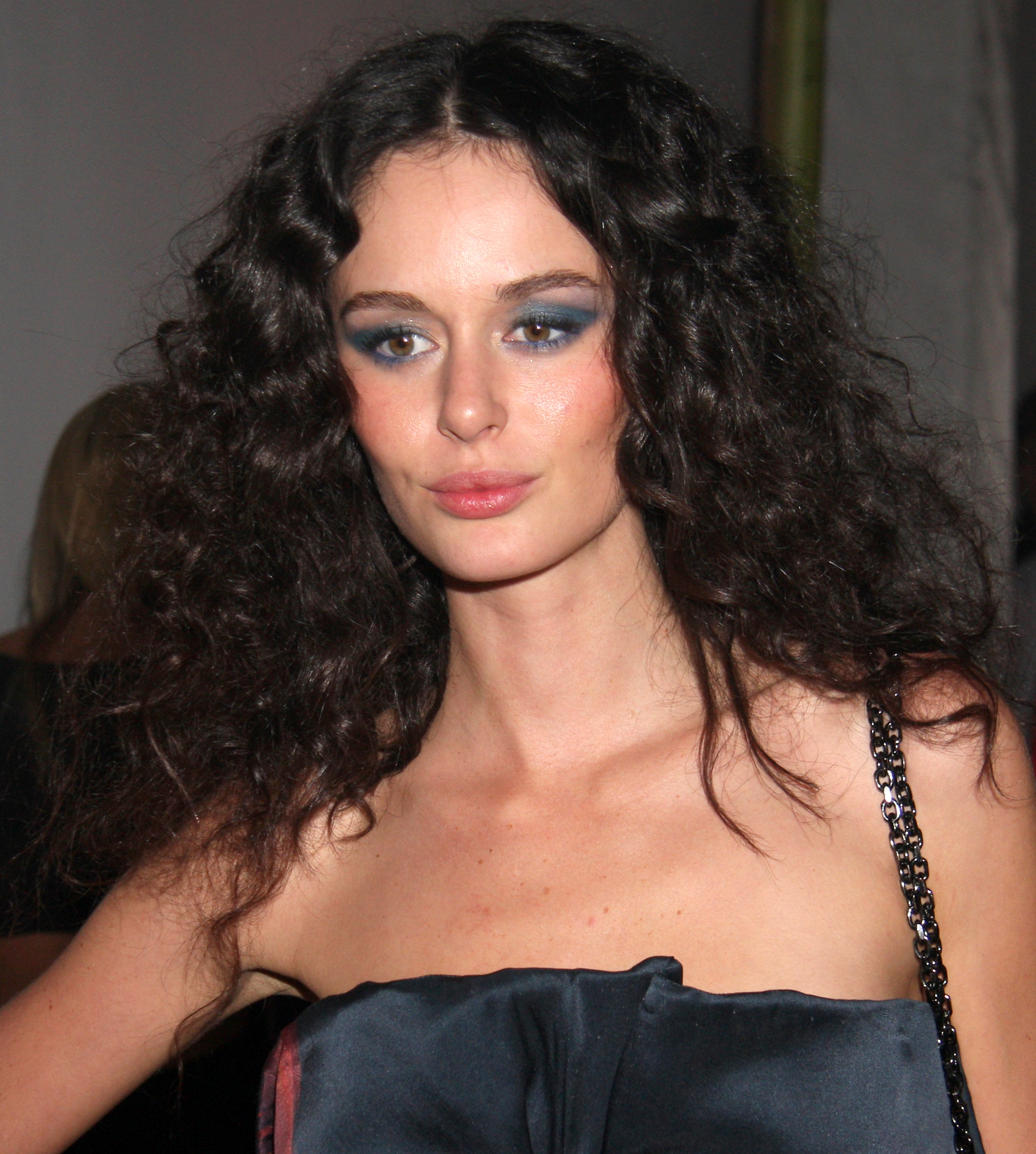
Trunfio in 2009

Trunfio was scouted when she was fifteen years old as she was shopping with her best friend in Perth by Christine Fox from Vivien's Model Management. When asked if she wanted to be a model, Trunfio responded "Absolutely not!" but eventually let Fox take her photo.

In 2002, Trunfio won the third season of the Australian talent show television series Search for a Supermodel. When she was sixteen, Trunfio moved from Dubbo to New York and signed a contract with modelling agency, Ford, in New York, after placing third place in Supermodel of the World, an international version of the show.

In 2012, Trunfio left her agency Chic Management and signed a contract with high-profile modelling agency IMG Models. She is represented by IMG Models in New York, Los Angeles, Paris, Milan and Sydney.

She has worked with and walked for high-fashion Australian and international designers including, Chanel, Versace, Christian Dior, Gucci, Fendi, Missoni, Valentino and Dolce & Gabbana.

In 2015, Trunfio featured on the June issue cover of Elle Australia, photographed by Australian fashion photographer, Georges Antoni. This cover story sparked controversy as Trunfio was photographed breastfeeding her four-month-old son.

=== Television and film ===
In 2002, Trunfio featured on the third season of the Network Ten Australian reality television series Search for a Supermodel and won, sparking her modelling career. She also featured on the international version, Supermodel of the World, where she placed third.

In 2008, Trunfio played the role of Italian temptress Jessica in the Australian film Two Fists, One Heart.

Trunfio played the role of Sappho in the 2008 drama The Last International Playboy.

In 2009, Trunfio joined the second season of the American reality television series Make Me a Supermodel. She joined Tyson Beckford and replaced Niki Taylor, becoming the new mentor for the female contestants.

Trunfio also made a cameo as a "brunette bikini babe" in Sofia Coppola's 2010 film Somewhere.

In 2010, Trunfio had a lead role in the dramatic short film My First Time, playing a mysterious girl named Jasmine.

In 2014, Trunfio starred in the first season of the Australian reality television modelling competition series The Face Australia. She was a mentor for one of the three teams, alongside mentors Cheyenne Tozzi and Naomi Campbell.

In 2014, Trunfio starred as Cindy in the Australian children's film Paper Planes alongside Australian actor Sam Worthington.

== Personal life ==
Trunfio began dating Texan blues musician Gary Clark Jr. in 2012 after they met at the Coachella Valley Music and Arts Festival at the Empire Polo Club in Indio, California. In November 2014, when Trunfio was seven months pregnant, she announced their engagement. The pair married on 19 April 2016 at the Colony Palms Hotel in Palm Springs, California with a Coachella-style wedding, inspired by the location they met. Her wedding dress was designed by Australian designer Steven Khalil.

In 2015, Trunfio announced the birth of her first child, a son. In an interview with Vogue, she said "my first [child birth] was a breeze—I was working until about six months in, shooting lingerie campaigns, flying to promote a movie I'd just shot [for] the Toronto International Film Festival and then onto Dubai for a TV commercial." The pair's second child, a daughter, was born in 2018. For her second pregnancy, Trunfio chose to give birth at home. "It did not go smoothly and I almost died", she told Vogue. In 2020, Trunfio and Clark's third child, another daughter, was born.

Trunfio has been living on a 50-acre horse ranch near Austin, Texas with her husband and their three children since 2017.

=== Business ventures ===
Trunfio is the founder and CEO of maternity clothing brand Bumpsuit, sustainable and ethical jewellery brand Erth Jewellery, and swimwear line Erth Swim.

In December 2016, Trunfio launched her own jewellery brand, Erth Jewellery, that focuses on sustainability.

In 2018, Trunfio collaborated with Australian luxury candle and fragrance brand Lumira, creating a candle titled "The Vow" to promote self-love and positivity. She was inspired by the scents of dark, mysterious hotels and late-night meals and cocktails after living in Paris for a year, as well as being on a yacht in the Mediterranean, between the Amalfi Coast, Italy and the South of France.

In February 2020, Trunfio launched her own maternity brand, Bumpsuit. She created Bumpsuit when she was pregnant with her third baby and felt frustrated with the lack of chic maternity options.

In July 2020, Trunfio launched her sustainable swimwear line Erth Swim, designed to "minimise its impact on the planet". She decided to create this brand after visiting Bali and seeing the state of the beaches after people had taken advantage of their environment, to raise awareness of this issue. All styles and designs for Erth Swim are made by women in Bali and greater Indonesia.

=== Views ===
In 2015, Trunfio faced backlash in regards to her Australian edition Elle magazine story, which featured her breastfeeding her four-month-old son. This image was released only to the subscribers' cover of the issue as a thank-you for subscribing, while an image of Trunfio holding her son was instead published to newsstands. Trunfio's image was criticized as the media has continued to shy away from images of breastfeeding mothers. Trunfio stated "I think it should be something that isn't a [subscribers' cover]…it's a huge part of being a woman and motherhood." However, Trunfio was also praised as some readers said "the image deserved wider release" in the interests of normalizing breastfeeding. Trunfio has since used the cover as an opportunity to advocate for a change in the stigma surrounding women who breastfeed in public using the hashtag "#NormalizeBreastfeeding" on her Instagram.

In 2016, Trunfio joined forces with clothing label Auguste in raising awareness of "1% For The Planet", an organisation that asks businesses to contribute at least 1% of net revenue to sustainability-oriented causes. She applauded the global sustainability movement, saying "it's really important for brands to give back, and I hope this campaign inspires other Australian labels to join 1% For The Planet."

In January 2017, Trunfio participated in the women's march in Austin, where she carried two signs that read "Your silence will not protect you" and "Women's rights, black rights, trans rights, immigrant rights are human rights".
