= Bill Diodato =

American photographer

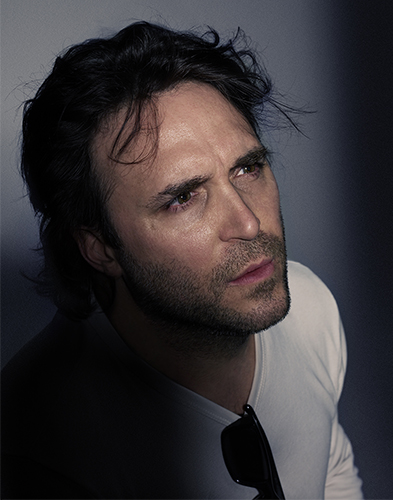
- Born: New England
- Known for: Photographic arts
- Notable work: Care of Ward 81
- Style: Minimalism
- Website: BillDiodato.com

Bill Diodato is an American advertising and editorial photographer, based in New York City. His work has been featured in various media platforms including magazines, books, television and film.

== Career ==
Diodato was born and raised in New England and was drawn to graphic design and advertising at an early age, which eventually led him to pursue commercial photography. He was inspired by the career of Irving Penn and studied at the Hallmark Institute of Photography.

After completing his studies, Diodato worked as an assistant in Boston before moving to New York City in 1990 to become a studio manager. He began his commercial career with a contract from the advertising agency Commercial Graphics Incorporated and went on to work with several editorial and advertising clients, including Victoria's Secret.

In 2008, Diodato collaborated with contemporary artist Jonah Freeman on a personal project in Marfa, Texas, where he created large format images from dozens of photographic plates. These images were later featured in the book “Hello Meth Lab In The Sun,” and Diodato has expressed an interest in showing them in a future exhibit

On September 11, 2001, Diodato had a photoshoot booked with Victoria's Secret, but it was canceled due to the tragic events of that morning. Instead, he decided to document the attacks on the World Trade Center towers, and CBS later picked up his footage. Diodato was able to share his footage with Dan Rather in the CBS newsroom, where he was reporting on the collapse of the North Tower. The footage was then analyzed by the NTIS during their three-year investigation of the WTC building collapses.

Diodato is still actively working on commercial assignments, as well as personal projects. His first monograph, "Care of Ward 81," was published by Golden Section Publishers, LLC in July 2010 and has since received recognition from several prestigious awards, including the Eric Hoffer Book Award, Communication Arts, American Photography, International Book award, and PDN. In 2005, Diodato was granted permission by the Oregon state legislature to photograph the then-closed Oregon State Mental Hospital, the same hospital where the Academy Award-winning film One Flew Over the Cuckoo's Nest was filmed. Through his photography, Diodato aimed to challenge stereotypes associated with women who suffer from mental illness and to offer a sense of closure for the women who were once confined to Ward 81.

In 1976, the acclaimed documentary photographer Mary Ellen Mark captured photographs of the female patients at Ward 81 while shooting film stills for One Flew Over the Cuckoo's Nest. Mark also wrote the foreword for "Care of Ward 81", which is the first of two limited-edition monographs by Diodato. The second monograph, tentatively titled "Cremains," focuses on the decline of institutional services and has yet to be released.

Golden Section Publishers, which is run by Diodato, has also published a trilogy of photographic books by Brian Rose. One of these books, "Time and Space on the Lower East Side 1980 + 2010," is a photographic essay on Manhattan’s lower east side and was released in 2011 in an edition of 1000. The second book, "Metamorphosis: Meatpacking District 1985 + 2013," is a photographic essay on Manhattan’s Meatpacking District and was released in 2014 in an edition of 1000. Both titles quickly sold out. The third book in the trilogy, titled "WTC," was edited by Brian Rose and designed by Diodato and Warren Mason. It was released on the fifteenth anniversary of the 9/11 tragedy in 2016.

=== TV appearances ===
In 2004, Diodato appeared on Tyra Banks' hit TV show America's Next Top Model on the Tarantula episode. In 2008, he appeared in Episode 8 of Bravo's Make Me a Supermodel's Season 1, and again in Episode 9 of Nude Accessory.

=== Litigation ===
In 2012, Diodato sued Avon for unauthorized use of his images. The case, Bill Diodato Photography LLC v. Avon Products, never went to trial, as it was settled for an undisclosed sum.

=== Bibliography ===
- "Care of Ward 81", Golden Section Publishers, 2010. Trade Edition. ISBN 978-0-9844384-0-2
- "Care of Ward 81", Golden Section Publishers, 2010. Slip-cased Edition. ISBN 978-0-9844384-1-9
- "Care of Ward 81", Golden Section Publishers, 2010. Deluxe Edition. ISBN 978-0-9844384-2-6
- "Hello Meth Lab in the Sun", Ballroom Marfa, 2009. ISBN 978-0-9817586-2-6
- "Tiffany Pearls" by John Loring. Harry Abrams, 2006. by John Loring. ISBN 0-8109-5443-5
- "Insomnia" by Steven King. 1994. ISBN 9782253151470

=== Awards ===
- 2015 – Graphis Photo Annual – Platinum, Gold, and Silver Award Winner
- 2013 – Graphis Photo Annual: 100 Best in Photography
- 2012 – Paul Harris Fellowship Award –
- 2012 – Norwich Native Son Award
- 2012– American Photography 28 Award book – two images selected from Bill's Care of Ward 81 Project
- 2011 – 2011 Eric Hoffer Book Independent Book Award – 1st Runner up of Art Category
- 2011 – 2011 Communication Arts Photography Annual – One of ten Winners in the Photography Book Category
- 2011 – 2011 International Book Awards: Award-Winner in the "Photography: General" category.
- 2011 – PDN Photo Annual 2011 – Category: Photo Books: “Care of Ward 81”
- 2011 – Graphis 100 Best in Photography 2011
- 2009 – International Photography Awards – category: Advertising/Beauty: Jewelry Story “Rock Therapy”
- 2008 – International Photography Awards: category: Advertising/Beauty: "Fall Foliage" – 1st Place Winner | category: Fine Art Still Life: "Religious Dieter"
- 2008 – Graphis 2008 Photo Annual – category: Portrait/Still-life: "Tattoo Man" and "Sneaker Creature"
- 2007 – Graphis 2007 Photo Annual – featured cover artist: "Chicken Feet"
- 2007 – Cannes International Photo Festival – "Belles Epoque" story – (photographed at the Baccarat Mansion in Paris), "The Other Woman", "Femme Fetale", & "In the News."
- 2006 – Cannes International Photo Festival – "Dangerous Fashion"
- 2006 – Society of Publication Designers Award:
- 2006 – Graphis 2006 Photo Annual:
- 2006 – American Photography Showcase 21
- 2005 – Graphis 2005 Photo Annual:
- 2005 – How Design Annual – Best Website
- 2005 – How Design Annual – Limited Edition Mailer – p. 98.
- 2004 – Communication Arts 2004 Design Annual – Top Editorial Award -"If You Wanna be Hardcore" from Angeleno Magazine, pp. 102, 103
- 2004 – Graphis 2004 Photo Annual:
- 2004 – Photo District News Photo Annual 2004:Digital/Electronic Self-Promotion: 1st Place, Best Website – p. 110
- 2003 – Communication Arts 2003 Photo Annual – Top Editorial Award: "Clothesline Across America" – pp. 58, 59, p. 99, p. 153

=== Exhibitions ===
Dillon Gallery: July 10 – August 1, 2012 – Care of Ward 81 show presenting 11 images from the Care of Ward 81 monograph.

The Gallery at Hallmark: February 4 – April 3, 2011 Care of Ward 81 show presenting 27 images from the Care of Ward 81 monograph.
