= Michelle Harper =

Colombian-American brand consultant and fashion personality

Michelle Violy Harper
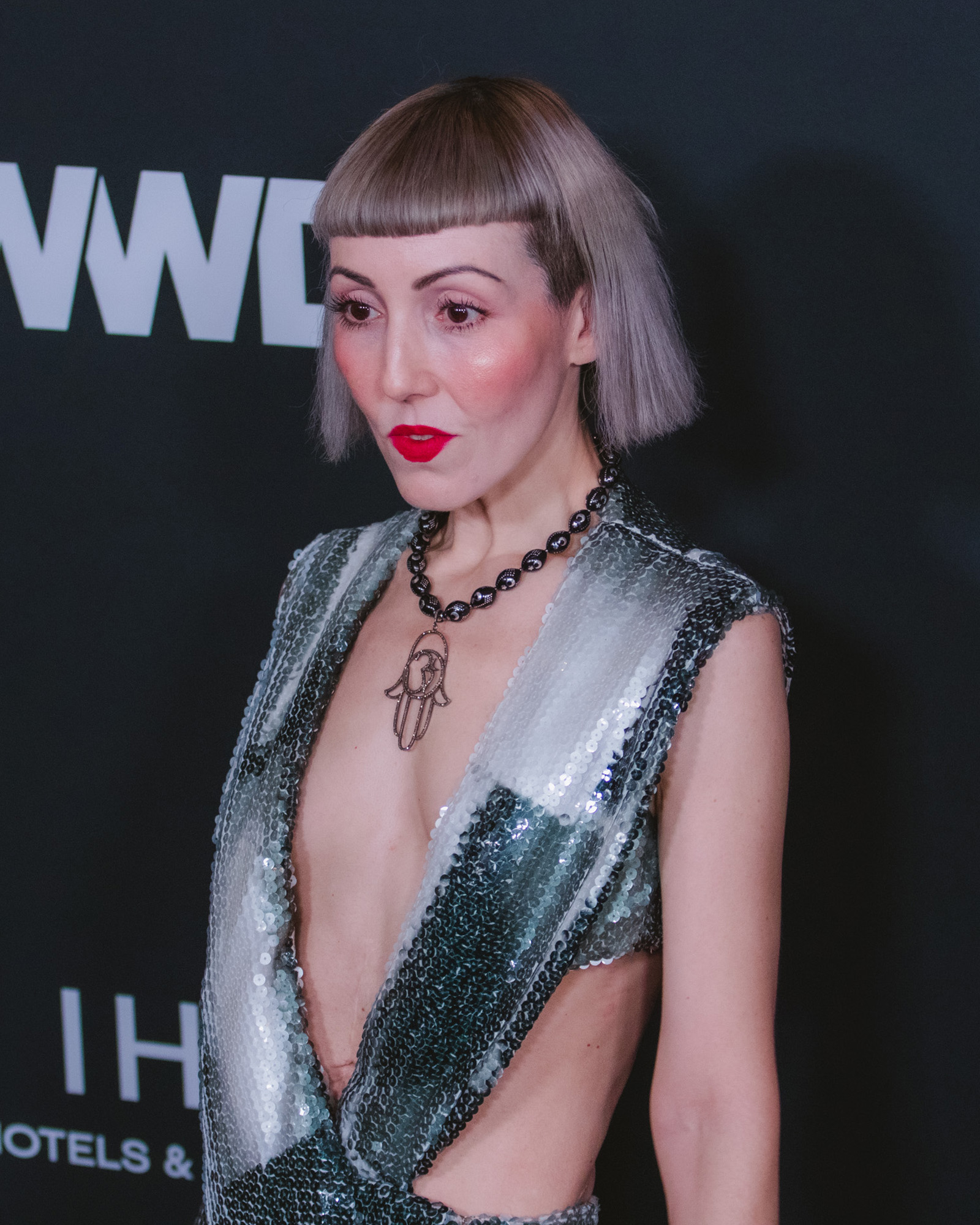
- Harper in 2026
- Born: 1977 or 1978 (age 48–49); Colombia
- Occupations: Brand consultant, businesswoman, entrepreneur
- Known for: Fashion and style
- Spouse: Jenny Shimizu (m. 2014)

Michelle Violy Harper is a Colombian-born American brand consultant and entrepreneur known for her presence in the fashion world. The New York Times described her "genuinely original and fantastical style of dressing", and Harper was named on the International Best Dressed List in 2012.

== Early life and education ==
Harper grew up between Barranquilla, Colombia and Manhattan's Upper West Side in a 2,100-square-foot (200 m^{2}) triplex overlooking the American Museum of Natural History. Her father, Henry Harper, and stepfather, Frederico Sève, are art dealers. Her mother worked at J.P. Morgan before founding Violy & Company, which advises businesses on Latin American expansion.

Harper attended the Lycée Français de New York and the Spence School before attending boarding school in Switzerland. She also attended a summer program at the Rhode Island School of Design.

== Career ==
=== Business and finance ===
Harper spent more than 10 years in corporate finance and business strategy, and worked at Martha Stewart Living Omnimedia.

She founded and leads the consultancy OWTH, and co-founded the cosmetic company CB LLC.

=== Fashion and public presence ===
In her youth, Harper was a fashion-conscious Club Kid known as Cutie Pie. She has since built an extensive wardrobe of shoes, wigs, and garments that occupies an entire living room wall, which she rotates each quarter.

Harper's style developed through her grandmother's influence and inspiration from architecture, nature, literature, and travel. Her makeup draws from Japanese theater, geishas, and maikos. Her approach to fashion has been compared to that of Lady Gaga and Daphne Guinness.

== Personal life ==
Harper has described herself as "a gay woman". Harper met model and actor Jenny Shimizu at a party hosted by model Karen Elson, where Shimizu challenged Harper to an arm wrestle. The couple married in 2014.

Harper lives in Manhattan.
