= Krissy Taylor =

American model (1978–1995)

- Born: Kristen Erin Taylor; May 15, 1978; Miami, Florida, U.S.
- Died: July 2, 1995 (aged 17); Pembroke Pines, Florida, U.S.
- Modeling information
- Height: 6 ft (183 cm)
- Hair color: Blonde
- Eye color: Brown

Kristen Erin "Krissy" Taylor (May 15, 1978 – July 2, 1995) was an American model.

== Early life and career ==
Taylor was born in Miami and lived in South Florida with her parents and two older sisters. Taylor's foray into the modeling world was largely due to being supermodel Niki Taylor's younger sister. At age 11, Taylor began going to shoots with Niki, and photographers began to include her in photos. Her first shoot with sister Niki appeared in Seventeen. She soon signed with her sister's modeling agency in New York, IMG.

At age 13, after Taylor accompanied her sister Niki to castings for the Fall Shows in Milan, the designers impulsively fitted Taylor, and she walked the runways alongside Naomi Campbell, Christy Turlington, and Claudia Schiffer. Thereafter, Taylor began getting calls to work solo. Taylor had amassed an impressive résumé of credits, including Elle, Italian Glamour, YM, Cosmopolitan, and Vogue. She had 13 covers to her credit, and appeared on Entertainment Tonight and MTV. She also did the 1994 Spring Collections in New York, landing eight shows, including Ralph Lauren.

Her last photo shoot was with sister Niki Taylor for the July/August 1995 cover of Ocean Drive magazine.

== Death ==
On July 2, 1995, Niki Taylor found Krissy lying unconscious on the floor of their family's home in Florida. After attempts to revive Taylor by her family and authorities failed, she was rushed to Memorial Hospital West and pronounced dead at 5:39 a.m. She was 17 years old.

Taylor was known to have had allergies that congested her upper respiratory system and she used Primatene, an over-the-counter epinephrine inhaler, to combat shortness of breath. While epinephrine can cause cardiac arrhythmia, it was impossible to prove she had taken any just prior to her death.

The official cause of death was an acute asthma attack complicated by sudden cardiac arrhythmia. However, she had no prior history of asthma, and no symptoms of a heart condition. Uncertain of the medical examiner's diagnosis, the Taylor family hired independent experts to study tissue samples of Taylor's heart muscle. Those experts concluded that the more likely cause of her death was a rare cardiac disease called arrhythmogenic right ventricular dysplasia (ARVD).

Taylor's mother, Barbara, is now involved with the Cardiac Arrhythmias Research and Education (CARE) Foundation.
