= Hallmark Institute of Photography =

Former photography school in Turners Falls, Massachusetts

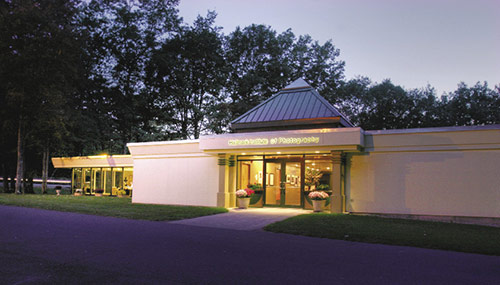
- Photograph of the Administrative Office Building at Hallmark Institute of Photography looking southwest
- Type: For-profit college
- Active: 1975–2016
- Administrative staff: 40
- Students: 72
- Location: Turners Falls, Massachusetts, USA
- Campus: Rural
- Acceptance Rate: 87% (2013)
- Website: web.archive.org/web/20161002101309/http://hallmark.edu/

The Hallmark Institute of Photography was a for-profit photography school located in Turners Falls, Massachusetts, operated by Premier Education Group. It was nationally accredited by the Accrediting Commission of Career Schools and Colleges. The school offered a 10-month certificate-granting program covering a mix of technical, artistic, and business aspects of photography.

The school was acquired by Premier after the bankruptcy of its previous owner and closed in October 2016 due to financial difficulties. The former Hallmark administrative building is now the home of the Franklin County Housing Authority.

== Facilities ==
The main facility was a 50,000-square-foot (4,600 m^{2}) building combining studios, a 350-seat auditorium, a student lounge area, a bookstore, faculty offices, and two large computer labs totaling approximately 140 workstations. In 2011, a video editing and production suite was added by converting an additional 5,000-square-foot (460 m^{2}) of administrative space. The suite offered 20 editing workstations, an audio studio and video production studio.

== Program ==
The school's 10-month program encompassed 1400 clock hours. In addition to photographic subjects, the program covered marketing, finance, and other aspects of operating a photographic business. A centerpiece of the program was its Guest Speaker series, which featured notable photographers such as Mary Ellen Mark, Douglas Kirkland, Kevin Bubriski, John Paul Caponigro, Craig Cutler, Bill Diodato, Andrew Eccles, Lynn Goldsmith, Marc Hauser, Vincent Laforet, Jay Maisel, Joe McNally, Michel Tcherevkoff, Richard Warren, William Wegman, Timothy White, Ron Wyatt, and Joyce Tenneson.

In September 2009 Gregory Heisler became the first Artist-in-Residence at Hallmark
