= Tacoma School =

- U.S. National Register of Historic Places
- Virginia Landmarks Register
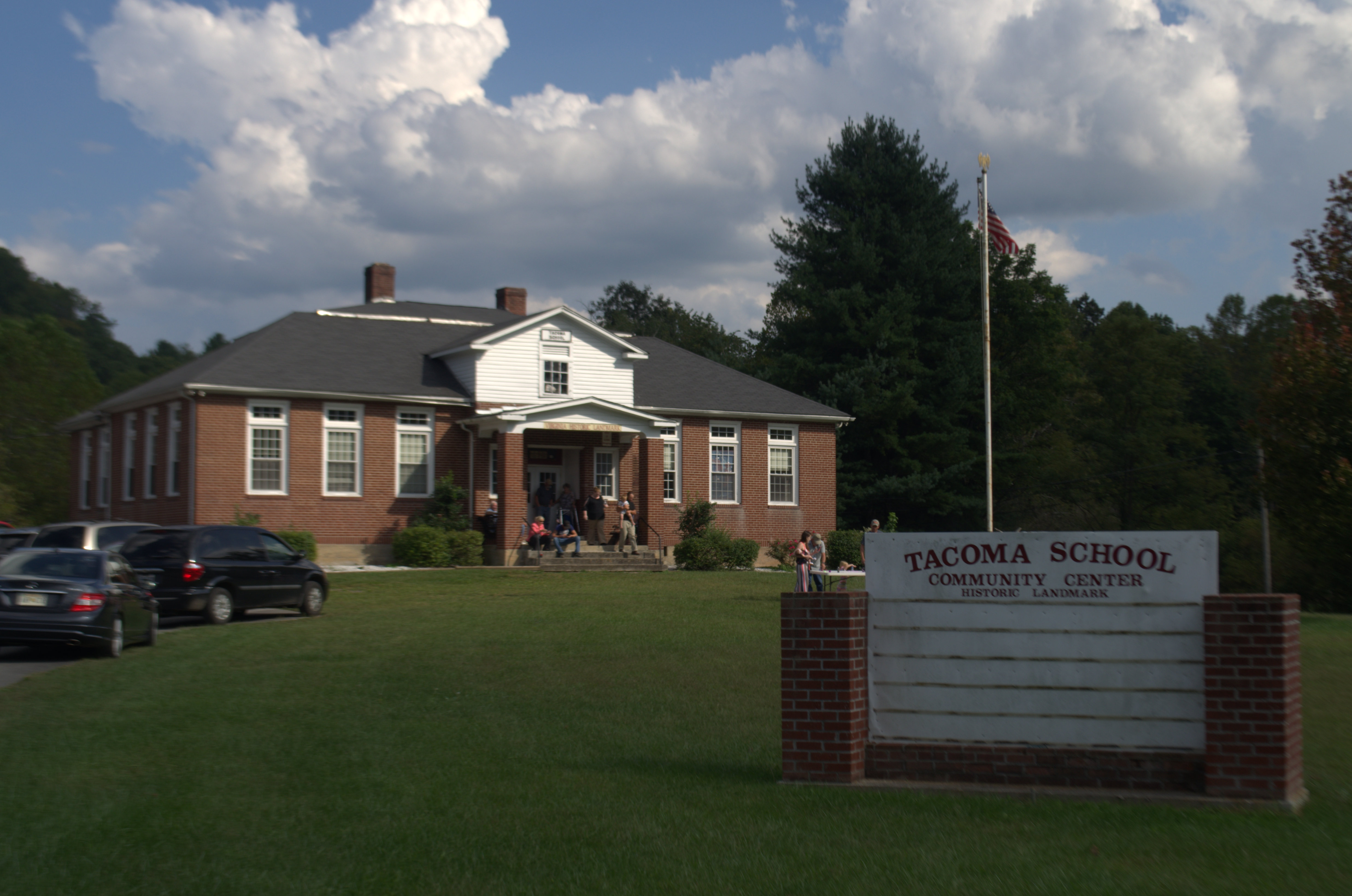
- Built in 1922 based on North Carolina State Plans.

- Location within Virginia Location within the United States
- Location: 4408 Stone Mountain Rd., Coeburn, Virginia
- Coordinates: 36°56′6″N 82°31′56″W
- Area: 2 acres (0.81 ha)
- Built: 1922, 1937
- Architect: Thomson, Frank K.; Barrett, Charles W.
- Architectural style: Late 19th And Early 20th Century American Movements
- NRHP reference No.: 97001072
- VLR No.: 097-0001

Significant dates
- Added to NRHP: September 12, 1997
- Designated VLR: July 2, 1997

Tacoma School, also known as Tacoma School Community Center, is a historic school building in Coeburn, Wise County, Virginia. It was built in 1922 and rebuilt after a fire in 1937. It is a one-story, nine-bay rectangular brick building with four classrooms. It has a projecting-centered gable bay and a hipped roof. The school was based on plans adopted by the North Carolina state school system in 1911. It ceased use as a school in 1973 and has been adapted for use as a Community Center.

It was listed on the National Register of Historic Places in 1997.
