= The Face Australia =

- Genre: Competition
- Presented by: Georges Antoni
- Judges: Cheyenne Tozzi; Naomi Campbell; Nicole Trunfio
- Country of origin: Australia
- Original language: English
- No. of seasons: 1
- No. of episodes: 8

Production
- Running time: 40–44 minutes
- Production company: Shine Australia

Original release
- Network: Fox8
- Release: 18 March – 6 May 2014

Related
- The Face (American)

The Face is an Australian reality television modelling competition series aired on Fox8 of Foxtel and produced by Shine Australia. Naomi Campbell was the show's executive producer and one of the three supermodel coaches of the series, as with the American and British versions. It was reported that the channel and production team acquired the right to create an adaptation for Australian TV on 31 August 2013. Filming for the series took place from 1 November to 4 December 2013. The series premiered on 18 March 2014 and concluded on 6 May 2014.

The show premiered to 40,000 national viewers, which was the 18th most watched show on subscription television that night, but only fourth most watched program on FOX8. The remaining episodes of the series rated under 50,000 national viewers, with the finale attracting only 16,000 viewers (plus 25,000 viewers on FOX8 +2).

== Hosts and Mentors ==
Mentors	Seasons
Mentors	1
Cheyenne Tozzi	✔
Naomi Campbell	✔
Nicole Trunfio	✔
Hosts	Seasons
Hosts	1
Georges Antoni	✔

== Seasons ==
Seasons	Premiere date	Winner	Runners-up	Other contestants in order of elimination	Number of contestants
1	18 March 2014	Olivia Donaldson	Yaya Deng; Sarah Tilleke	Natalie Roser, Susan Yovan (quit), Shenika Rule, Melise Williams, Anouska Freedman, Brittaney Johnston, Nikolina Kovacevic, Ruth Willmer & Chantal Monaghan	12

Mentor's color symbols

Team Cheyenne (Season 1)
Team Naomi (Season 1)
Team Nicole (Season 1)

== See also ==
- The Face (U.S.)
- Make Me a Supermodel
- Australia's Next Top Model
