= Coeburn, Virginia =

- Town
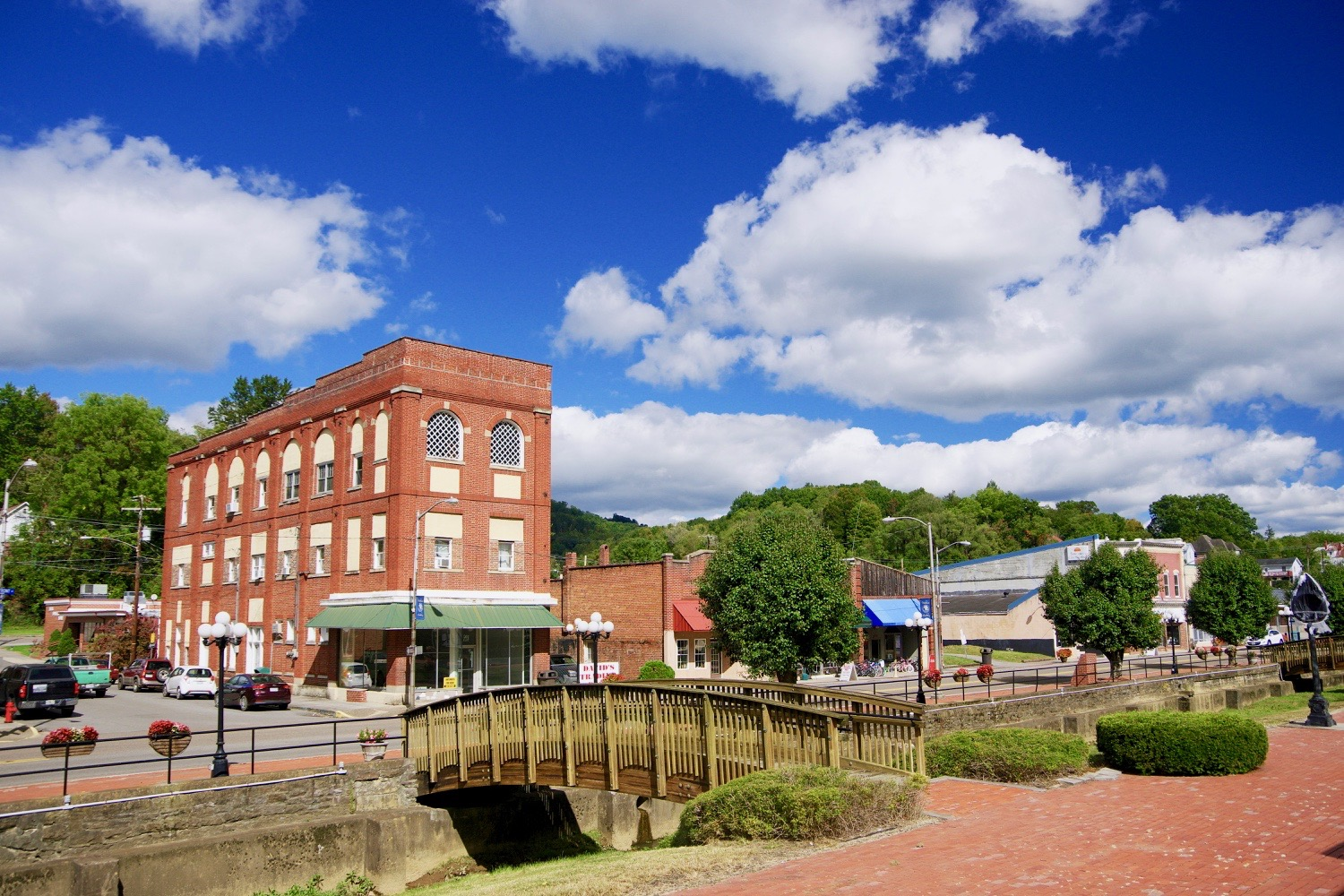
- Front Street

- Seal

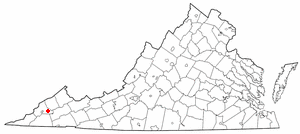
- Location of Coeburn, Virginia
- Coordinates: 36°56′38″N 82°27′58″W
- Country: United States
- State: Virginia
- County: Wise

Area
  - Total: 1.95 sq mi (5.06 km^{2})
  - Land: 1.95 sq mi (5.05 km^{2})
  - Water: 0.0039 sq mi (0.01 km^{2})
- Elevation: 1,995 ft (608 m)

Population (2020)
  - Total: 1,598
  - Estimate (2019): 1,845
  - Density: 946.3/sq mi (365.35/km^{2})
- Time zone: UTC−5 (Eastern (EST))
  - Summer (DST): UTC−4 (EDT)
- ZIP code: 24230
- Area code: 276
- FIPS code: 51-17952
- GNIS feature ID: 1482614
- Website: Official website

Coeburn is a town in Wise County, Virginia, United States, along the Guest River. As of the 2020 census, Coeburn had a population of 1,598.

== History ==
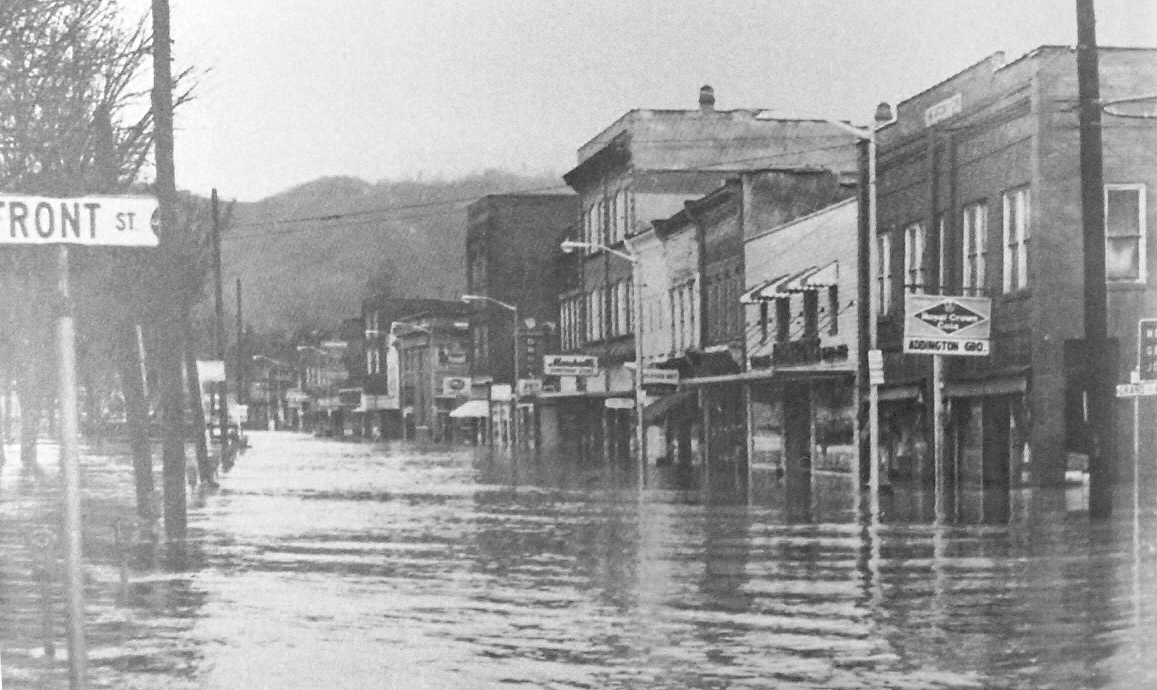
Flood in Coeburn in 1963

The Town of Coeburn was originally named Guest Station after explorer and surveyor Christopher Gist. Gist writes about the area of Coeburn in his trip journals of making camp in the area with his son, Tom.

Incorporated in 1894, the town changed its name to Coeburn after W. W. Coe, Chief Engineer of the N&W Railroad, and Judge W. E. Burns.

The Tacoma School was listed on the National Register of Historic Places in 1997.

== Geography ==
Coeburn is located at 36°56′38″N 82°27′58″W (36.943872, −82.466069). The town lies along U.S. Route 58 Alternate, east of Norton and west of St. Paul. Virginia State Route 72 passes through the downtown area. The community of Riverview is located across the Guest River to the south.

According to the United States Census Bureau, the town has a total area of 2.0 square miles (5.3 km^{2}), all land. Coeburn has many mountains and hills.

== Demographics ==
Historical population
Census	Pop.	Note	%±
1900	295		—
1910	645		118.6%
1920	884		37.1%
1930	784		−11.3%
1940	764		−2.6%
1950	760		−0.5%
1960	2,471		225.1%
1970	2,362		−4.4%
1980	2,625		11.1%
1990	2,165		−17.5%
2000	1,996		−7.8%
2010	2,139		7.2%
2020	1,598		−25.3%
2025 (est.)	1,535	▼	−3.9%
U.S. Decennial Census

=== 2020 census ===
As of the 2020 census, Coeburn had a population of 1,598. The median age was 46.6 years. 19.6% of residents were under the age of 18 and 22.2% of residents were 65 years of age or older. For every 100 females there were 88.0 males, and for every 100 females age 18 and over there were 86.8 males age 18 and over. The entire population is listed as living in a rural area.

There were 699 households in Coeburn, of which 26.3% had children under the age of 18 living in them. Of all households, 41.9% were married-couple households, 18.5% were households with a male householder and no spouse or partner present, and 34.6% were households with a female householder and no spouse or partner present. About 33.8% of all households were made up of individuals and 16.5% had someone living alone who was 65 years of age or older.

There were 817 housing units, of which 14.4% were vacant. The homeowner vacancy rate was 0.7% and the rental vacancy rate was 14.0%.

Racial composition as of the 2020 census
Race	Number	Percent
White	1,520	95.1%
Black or African American	28	1.8%
American Indian and Alaska Native	3	0.2%
Asian	4	0.3%
Native Hawaiian and Other Pacific Islander	0	0.0%
Some other race	6	0.4%
Two or more races	37	2.3%
Hispanic or Latino (of any race)	19	1.2%

=== 2000 census ===
As of the census of 2000, there were 1,996 people, 810 households, and 575 families living in the town. The population density was 973.8 people per square mile (375.9/km^{2}). There were 923 housing units at an average density of 450.3 per square mile (173.8/km^{2}).

There were 810 households, out of which 29.6% had children under the age of 18 living with them, 50.2% were married couples living together, 16.3% had a female householder with no husband present, and 28.9% were non-families. 26.0% of all households were made up of individuals, and 11.6% had someone living alone who was 65 years of age or older. The average household size was 2.44 and the average family size was 2.92.

In the town, the population was spread out, with 22.5% under the age of 18, 9.4% from 18 to 24, 28.6% from 25 to 44, 23.9% from 45 to 64, and 15.6% who were 65 years of age or older. The median age was 39 years. For every 100 females, there were 93.4 males. For every 100 females age 18 and over, there were 90.5 males.

The median income for a household in the town was $25,025, and the median income for a family was $28,929. The per capita income for the town was $12,802. About 17.0% of families and 20.5% of the population were below the poverty line, including 29.9% of those under age 18 and 7.8% of those age 65 or over.

== Education ==
Coeburn is home to three public schools: Coeburn Primary, Coeburn Middle, and Eastside High.

== Government ==
The Town of Coeburn is governed under a Manager/Council form of government with 5 elected Council members elected at large in May.

== Notable people ==
- Holly Kiser – first Make Me a Supermodel winner
- Jesse McReynolds – bluegrass musician
- Danny O'Quinn Jr. – professional stock car racer
- Tracy Stallard – professional baseball pitcher for seven seasons, best known for allowing Roger Maris' record-breaking 61st home run in 1961
- Ralph Stanley – bluegrass musician

== Recreation ==
Camping is available nearby at Bark Camp Lake in the Jefferson National Forest with other activities including boating and fishing. The Guest River Gorge Trail, built along the Guest River on what was formerly the Interstate Railroad, is also located in the Jefferson National Forest and is a popular place to walk or ride a bicycle. Recently Coeburn joined with neighboring St. Paul on the Mountain View Trail System for ATVs.
