= Gregory Heisler =

American photographer

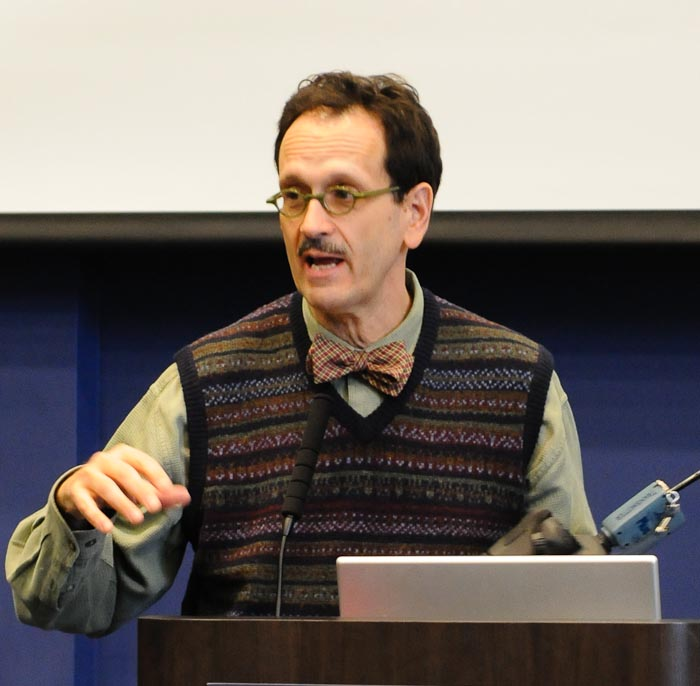
Gregory Heisler giving a talk in Burlington, Vermont on October 24, 2010.

Gregory Heisler (born 1954) is an American photographer known for his evocative portrait work often found on the cover of magazines, such as Time, for which he has produced a number of Man, Person, and People of the Year covers.

Heisler once had his White House photographer privileges revoked after taking a photograph of President George H. W. Bush for Time magazine in which Heisler used in camera techniques of double exposure to show what the cover labeled the two faces of Bush. The president was unaware of this photographic technique being used at the time of the shot. Bush press secretary Marlin Fitzwater later wrote about his own anger over this incident in his memoir Call the Briefing! Heisler's trade group protested the ban because it was based on an editorial opinion that was expressed. Heisler has since taken photographs of President George W. Bush.

Among the awards Heisler has received are: 1986 ASMP Corporate Photographer of the Year, 1988 Leica Medal of Excellence, 1991 World Image Award, 2000 Alfred Eisenstaedt Award

In September 2009 Gregory Heisler took a position as Artist-in-Residence at the Hallmark Institute of Photography in Turners Falls, Massachusetts. He acted as a teacher and liaison between the students and world of professional photography, expanding their present curriculum, and providing the students with necessary skills and techniques the school did not previously teach.

Heisler has now joined the Multimedia Photography & Design program at the S.I. Newhouse School of Public Communications at Syracuse University as a distinguished professor of photography, according to an announcement by the NPPA on April 25, 2014.
