= Natalie Roser =

Australian fashion model (born 1990)

Natalie Jayne Roser
- Born: Natalie Jayne Roser; 18 May 1990 (age 36); Newcastle, New South Wales, Australia
- Education: Cardiff High School (NSW)/University of Newcastle
- Occupation: Fashion model
- Years active: 2003-present

Natalie Jayne Roser (born 18 May 1990) is an Australian fashion model.

She is married to actor Harley Bonner and they have a daughter Aurelia who was born in February 2025.

== Early life ==
Born in Newcastle on May 18, 1990, Roser started modelling from the age of 13. She spent time living and modelling in Los Angeles. She currently lives in Sydney. In 2022 she purchased a home in the Newcastle suburb of Valentine and has since returned to living in the region.

== Modelling career ==
Roser was finalist in the Miss Universe Australia, as well as a contestant on the first season of The Face Australia, where she was the first eliminated, finishing in twelfth place. She became the Maxim cover girl for October 2016.
