= Tyson Beckford =

Jamaican-Panamanian American model and actor (born 1970)

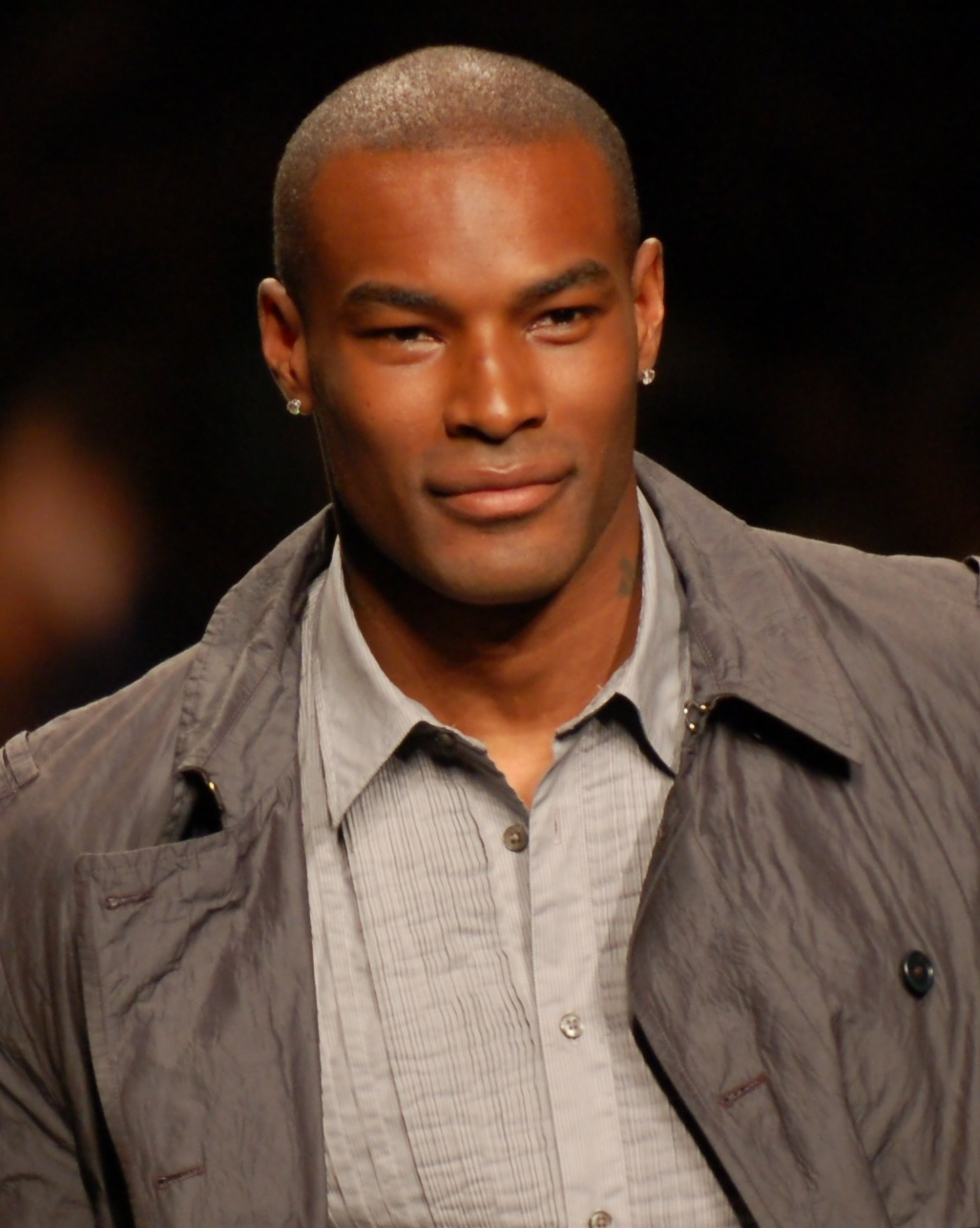
- Beckford in 2007
- Born: December 19, 1970 (age 55); New York City, U.S.
- Children: 1
- Modeling information
- Height: 1.83 m (6 ft 0 in)

Tyson Beckford (born December 19, 1970) is a Jamaican-American model and actor best known as a Ralph Lauren Polo model. He was also the host of both seasons of the Bravo program Make Me a Supermodel. Beckford has been described as one of the most successful male supermodels of all time, achieving fame and huge contracts similar to the female models who had huge success in the 1990s.

== Early life ==
Beckford was born in Bronx, New York, on December 19, 1970, to a Jamaican mother, Hillary Dixon Hall, and a Panamanian father of Chinese-Jamaican descent, Lloyd Beckford.

Soon after he was born, his mother took the family back to Jamaica, where they lived for seven years before moving to Rochester, New York, where he attended and graduated from Pittsford Mendon High School. During his school years, Tyson was often teased about his looks.

== Career ==
In 1992, Erik Lauren Counsel of the hip hop magazine The Source approached Beckford "in Washington Square Park" about being "in a style piece" in the magazine New York City. In an August 2021 VLADTV interview, Beckford clarified that nobody named Jeff Jones "discovered him" and said that "the person who gets the credit is Erik."

Confusion about his discovery might have happened after a 2005 People magazine interview, when Beckford stated that his career began as he was "minding his own business" in Manhattan's Washington Square Park, when scouts from the hip hop magazine The Source asked him to pose. "I'm thinkin', 'Yeah, this is some porno magazine,'" he recalled, "but everything was legit."

In 1993, Beckford was recruited by Ralph Lauren as the front model for the company's Polo line of male sportswear.

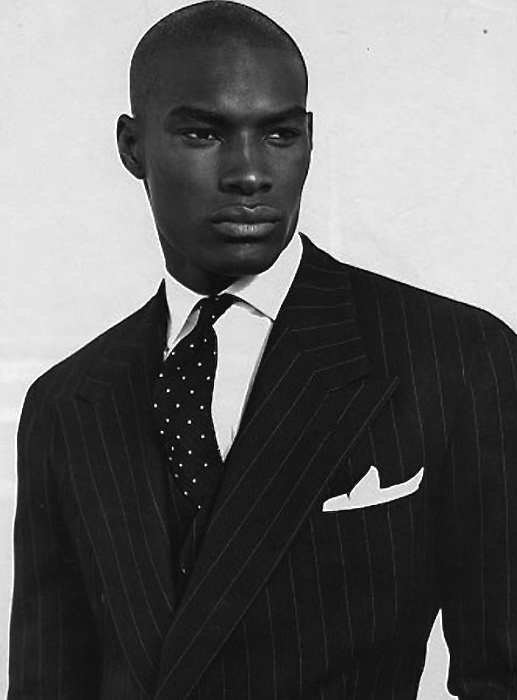
Early photo of Beckford for Ralph Lauren Corporation by Arnaldo Anaya-Lucca

Beckford was named "Man of the Year" in 1995 by cable television music channel VH1 and one of the "50 Most Beautiful People in the World" by People magazine. He is represented by Soul Artist Management in New York City and D'management Group in Milan. He was ranked at number 38 on VH1's 40 Hottest Hotties of the '90s.

In 2003, he appeared on the ABC network's celebrity reality game show I'm a Celebrity... Get Me Out of Here!. In September 2008, he supported the National RESPECT! Campaign against domestic violence, recording a voice message for the Giverespect.org Web site, speaking about the importance of respect for others.

Beckford co-hosted the modeling contest Make Me a Supermodel on the television channel Bravo with fellow supermodel Niki Taylor. The show chose Nicole Trunfio to join Beckford as a mentor to the model contestants for the show's second season. Other judges included designer Catherine Malandrino, model Jenny Shimizu, photographer Perou, and model scout Marlon.

Beckford judged and mentored the contestants of the first few episodes of the Australian version of Make Me a Supermodel with model and former Miss Universe Jennifer Hawkins. In 2012, he participated in Fox's dating game show The Choice.

He was one of the judges on the British version of America's Next Top Model.

== Personal life ==
On June 6, 2005, Beckford was injured during a vehicle accident in Secaucus, New Jersey, in which his 2004 Dodge Ram SRT-10 struck a utility pole and caught fire. He was taken to the Jersey City Medical Center and hospitalized for head trauma and cuts. During an interview on The Oprah Winfrey Show, Beckford claimed the accident had a profound effect on his spirituality.

Beckford has been a resident of the New Jersey communities of Edgewater and West New York.

Beckford has a son (born 1998) from a relationship with stylist April Roomet, who appears on the E! Television program Candy Girls. Beckford is an ambassador for the nonprofit Kick 4 Life, an organization that uses the power of soccer to engage vulnerable youth in holistic care and support in Lesotho.

== Filmography ==
=== Films ===
Year	Title	Role	Notes
2000	Boricua's Bond	–	
2001	Zoolander	Himself	
2002	Trois 2: Pandora's Box	Lance Racine	
2002	Gully	Man / Prisoner	
2003	Biker Boyz	Donny	
2004	Gas	Karl	
2005	Searching for Bobby D	Jerome	
2005	Into the Blue	Primo	
2005	Wait	Charles	Short
2008	Kings of the Evening	Homer Hobbs	
2008	Hotel California	Al	
2014	Addicted	Corey	
2015	Chocolate City	Adrian 'Rude Boy'	
2015	Supermodel	Alex	
2022	Singleholic	Manuele	

=== Television ===
Year	Title	Role	Notes
2002	My Wife and Kids	Hunter	Episode: "The Kyles Go to Hawaii: Part 1 & 2"
2002–03	Hollywood Squares	Himself/Panelist	Recurring Guest
2003	I'm a Celebrity...Get Me Out of Here!	Himself	Cast Member: Season 1
2003	Half & Half	Sexy Guy	Episode: "The Big 'I Have a Dream' Episode"
2004	Making the Video	Motorcycle Man	Episode: "Britney Spears: Toxic"
2004	MTV Cribs	Himself	Episode: "Nov 21, 2004"
2005	Making the Video	Motorcyclist	Episode: "Britney Spears: Toxic"
2006	Urbanation (Travel)	Himself	Episode: "New York 3"
2006	Queer Eye	Himself	Episode: "Messenger to Model Material: Jesan H"
2007–11	America's Next Top Model	Himself/Guest Judge	Recurring Guest Judge
2008	Tim Gunn's Guide to Style	Himself	Episode: "Erica"
2008–09	Make Me a Supermodel	Himself/Host	Main Host
2011–13	Britain's Next Top Model	Himself/Judge	Guest Judge: Season 7, Main Judge: Season 8-9
2012	The Choice	Himself	Episode: "Season Finale"
2013	The Real Housewives of Atlanta	Himself	Episode: "Secrets Revealed"
2014	SWV Reunited	Himself	Episode: "SWV's Comeback"
2014	FNL's Flashback Friday	Himself	Episode: "Tyson Beckford"
2014	The Face	Himself/Judge	Episode: "Runway Dinner Party"
2016	The Characters	Himself	Episode: "Natasha Rothwell"
2016–17	Hollywood Game Night	Himself/Celebrity Player	Guest Celebrity Player: Season 4-5
2017	Match Game	Himself	Episode: "Episode #2.8"
2017	Hip Hop Squares	Himself/Contestant	Recurring Guest
2017	90's House	Himself	Episode: "The one with the Big Finale"
2019	Huge in France	Himself	Recurring Cast
2020	Legendary	Himself/Guest Judge	Episode: "Once Upon a Time"
2021	The Mediator	Himself	Episode: "Model Behavior"
2022	Uncensored	Himself	Episode: "Tyson Beckford"
2023	Dancing with the Stars	Himself/Contestant	Contestant: Season 32
2024	In Vogue: The 90s	Himself	Episode: "The American Moment"

=== Music videos ===
Year	Title	Artist
1992	"Anything"	SWV
1993	"Go West"	Pet Shop Boys
1993	"Breathe Again"	Toni Braxton
1994	"Slow Down"	Trisha Covington
1995	"Live Niguz"	Onyx
1995	"Ice Cream"	Raekwon
1995	"My Up and Down"	Adina Howard
1995	"One More Chance"	The Notorious B.I.G.
1996	"Un-Break My Heart"	Toni Braxton
1997	"Anywhere You Want"	Simbi Khali
1998	"Horse & Carriage"	Cam'ron
1998	"What'cha Wanna Do?"	Mia X
1998	"The Way It's Going Down"	Shaq
1998	"Raise the Roof"	Luke
2003	"21 Questions"	50 Cent
2003	"Act a Fool"	Ludacris
2003	"Industry"	Wyclef Jean
2003	"Say How I Feel"	Rhian Benson
2004	"Toxic"	Britney Spears
2007	"China Wine"	Sun aka Geisha
2008	"How It Was Supposed to Be"	Ryan Leslie
2008	"Go Hard"	DJ Khaled
2014	"With Your Love"	Yola Araújo
2015	"Infinity"	Mariah Carey
2022	"2 Be Loved (Am I Ready)"	Lizzo
