= Holly Kiser =

American fashion model (born 1986)

- Born: 1986 (age 39–40); Coeburn, Virginia, U.S.
- Other name: Holly
- Modeling information
- Height: 5 ft 10 in (1.78 m)
- Hair color: Brown
- Eye color: Brown
- Agency: New York Model Management, L.A. Models, Connected Models, Red Eleven

Holly Kiser (born 1986) is an American fashion model. She was the first winner of Make Me a Supermodel.

== Career ==
Holly is currently signed with L.A Model Management in Los Angeles, Connected Models in Hong Kong and Red eleven in Auckland, New Zealand.

She has appeared in GQ magazine, and on the cover of City Luxe. She has also appeared in Metrocity ads and in Fashion Workshop, Jessica Code, In Magazine and other various magazines.
