= Jenny Shimizu =

American model and actress (born 1967)

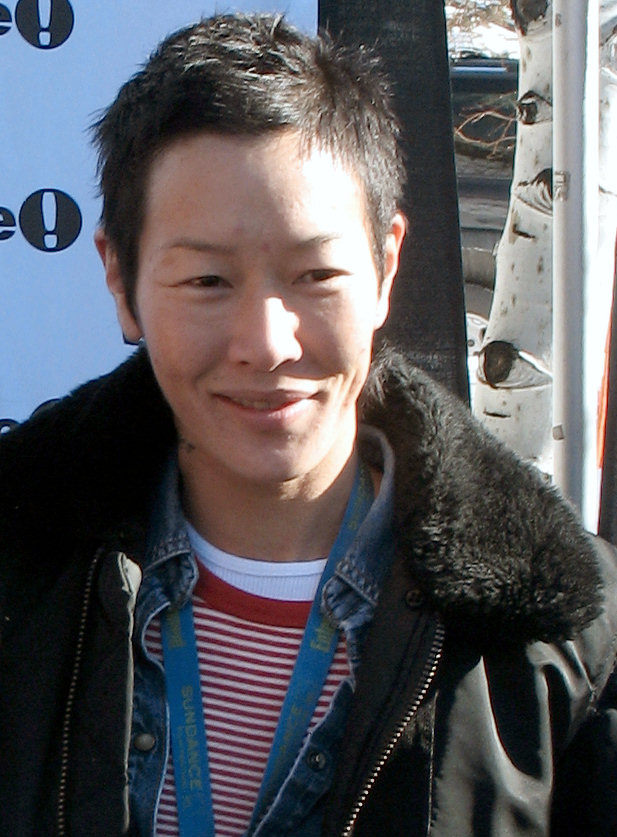
- Shimizu in 2006
- Born: June 16, 1967 (age 58); San Jose, California, U.S.
- Occupations: Model, actress
- Spouse: Michelle Harper (m. 2014)
- Modeling information
- Height: 5 ft 7 in (1.70 m)
- Hair color: Black
- Eye color: Black

Jenny Lynn Shimizu (born June 16, 1967) is an American model and actress.

== Early life ==
Shimizu was born in San Jose, California, and raised in Santa Maria.

== Career ==
While working as a mechanic, Shimizu was approached to model for the Calvin Klein CK1 fragrance advertisements and Calvin Klein fashion. She later was featured in the Banana Republic "American Beauty" campaign.

She became the first Asian model to walk for Prada, and was the first minority model to open the show.

Shimizu was one of the stars of Foxfire, alongside Angelina Jolie. She also had a supporting role in Jamie Babbit's 2007 film Itty Bitty Titty Committee. Shimizu appeared in the third season of the Here TV original series Dante's Cove.

In 2005, Shimizu appeared as a special guest on Tyra Banks's reality show America's Next Top Model. She appeared in season two of Bravo TV's Make Me a Supermodel as a member of the judging panel.

In 2019, Shimizu appeared in the documentary House of Cardin, discussing the groundbreaking Pierre Cardin model, Hiroko Matsumoto.

== Personal life ==
In the mid-1990s, Shimizu had a romantic relationship with Angelina Jolie, which Jolie confirmed in a 1997 interview when she said, "I fell in love with her the first second I saw her. I would probably have married Jenny if I hadn't married my husband (Jonny Lee Miller)." During that same decade, she also had a romantic relationship with Madonna, which she later recalled by saying "You'd get a phone call like, 'Hey can you meet me at my Paris show. You're in Europe right?' So I'd be like, 'Yeah, I'm just finishing Prada. Right after Prada I'll catch a plane over.' And I would. I'd go over to her hotel, to the Ritz, at like 4 in the morning, have sex, and then fly back to Milan."

In 2005, to protest against America's laws on gay marriage, Shimizu took part in a staged wedding ceremony with Rebecca Loos on the Sky documentary Power Lesbian UK (broadcast as Power Lesbians on Logo in the U.S.). The two had a relationship for a period thereafter.

In 2012, Shimizu met Michelle Harper at a party. They married in August 2014.
