= Roxanne Lowit =

American photographer (1942–2022)

Roxanne Elizabeth Lowit (February 22, 1942 – September 13, 2022) was an American fashion and celebrity photographer. Lowit was said to have "become as much a celebrity as those she photographed."

== Career ==
Lowit did not go to school to be a photographer. She graduated from the Fashion Institute of Technology in New York with a degree in art history and textile design and worked as a textile designer for a decade, collaborating with designers like Donna Karan, Jean Muir, and Scott Barrie. She took an early interest in photographing her friends with her with a 110 Instamatic camera gifted to her by Antonio Lopez. "I paint and there were people who I wanted to sit for me but they had no time, so I started taking pictures of them. I liked the gratification of getting the instant image so I traded in my paintbrushes for a camera."

Lowit started taking pictures professionally in 1977 after being assigned to photograph the Paris fashion shows by the Soho Weekly News. Before long she was covering all the designers in Paris where her friends – models like Jerry Hall – would sneak her backstage. It was there that she found her place (and career) in fashion. "For me, that's where it was happening," she says. "No one thought there was anything going on backstage, so for years I was alone and loved it. I guess I made it look too good because now it's so crowded with photographers. But there's enough room for everybody."

Today, her photographs have appeared in many magazines, such as Italian Vanity Fair, French Elle, V Magazine, and Glamour, and become a vehicle for much of her advertising work, including campaigns for Dior, Barney's NY and Vivienne Westwood.

== Solo exhibitions ==
- 2011 Legendary Privacy; Kaune, Sudendorf Gallery, Cologne, Germany

== Publications ==
- Roxanne Lowit: Moments (1990)
- Roxanne Lowit: People (2001)
- Roxanne Lowit: "Backstage Dior" foreword and fashion by John Galliano (2009)
- Roxanne Lowit: "Yves Saint Laurent" foreword by Pierre Berge (2014)
