= Howard Schatz =

American photographer ophthalmologist

- Born: 1940 (age 85–86)
- Occupations: Photographer, Former Ophthalmologist, Retina Specialist

Howard Schatz (born 1940) is an American photographer, who previously had a career as an ophthalmologist, retina specialist.

== Life and work ==
=== Ophthalmology ===
Schatz began his professional life in medicine. He completed his medical degree at The University of Illinois College of Medicine, followed by an internship at Cook County Hospital in Chicago, ophthalmology residency at The University of Illinois Eye and Ear Infirmary. He had a fellowship in medical retina and another fellowship in surgical retina, both at The Wilmer Eye Institute of Johns Hopkins Hospital.

Schatz had an academic and private practice as a retina specialist. In San Francisco from 1973 to 1995. He was a Clinical Professor of Ophthalmology at the University of California, San Francisco.

=== Photography ===
His photography includes a wide range of subject matter including dance, sports, portraiture, studies of the human body and innovative approaches to photography.

=== Personal life ===
Schatz is married to Beverly Ornstein, the former head of Current Affairs at PBS television station, KQED, in San Francisco; she is currently executive producer for Schatz Ornstein Studio. They live and work in New York.

== Publications ==
As Howard Schatz, M.D. Howard Schatz authored more than 150 scientific articles and numerous book chapters. Select peer-reviewed articles include: • Schatz H: Alport's syndrome in a Negro kindred. Am J Ophthalmol. 1971;71:1236-1240. • Schatz H, Urist M: An instrument for measuring ocular torticollis. AAOO. 1971;75:650-653. • Schatz H: Sarcomatous transformation of benign orbital neurilemoma. Arch Ophthalmol. 1971;86:268-273. • Patz A, Schatz H et al.: Argon laser photocoagulation in diabetic retinopathy. Trans Am Acad Ophthalmol. 1972;76:984-989. • Schatz H, Mendelblatt F: Solar retinopathy from LSD sun-gazing. Br J Ophthalmol. 1973;57:270-273. • Schatz H, Patz A: Exudative senile maculopathy: laser treatment results. Arch Ophthalmol. 1973;90:183-202. • Schatz H, Maumenee AE, Patz A: Geographic helicoid peripapillary choroidopathy. Trans Am Acad Ophthalmol. 1974;78:747-761. • Kelley JS, Patz A, Schatz H: Management of retinal branch vein occlusion. Ann Ophthalmol. 1974;6:1123-1134. • Schatz H: Central serous chorioretinopathy. Int Ophthalmol Clin. 1975;15(1):159-168. • Schatz H, Yannuzzi LA, Stransky TJ: Retinal detachment in vein occlusion. Ann Ophthalmol. 1976;8:1437-1471.

Medical Books and Booklets • Fundus Fluorescein Angiography: A Composite Slide Collection (1975, 1976) • Interpretation of Fundus Fluorescein Angiography (1978) • The Macula (1979) • Laser Treatment of Fundus Disease (1980) • Essential Fluorescein Angiography (1983) • Laser Photocoagulation of Retinal Disease (1988) • California Resource Directory for the Blind (1991) • For Our Patients: Macular Degeneration (1987–1997 editions) • For Our Patients: Diabetic Retinopathy (1988–1998 editions) • Retinal Detachment and Vitreous Surgery (1989–1998 editions)

=== Photography Books As Howard Schatz and Beverly Ornstein ===
- 1992: Gifted Woman Pacific Photographic Press
- 1993: Seeing Red: The Rapture of Redheads Pomegranate Press
- 1994: Homeless: Portraits of Americans in Hard Times. Chronicle Books.
- 1995: Newborn. Chronicle Books.
- 1995: WaterDance. Graphis Press
- 1996: The Princess of the Spring and the Queen of the Sea
- 1996: BodyType. Stewart Tabori and Chang
- 1997: Passion & Line. Graphis Press
- 1998: Pool Light. Graphis Press
- 2000: Bodyknots. Rizzoli
- 2000: NudeBodyNude. Harper Collins
- 2002: Rare Creatures. Wonderland Press
- 2002: Athlete. Harper Collins
- 2005: Botanica. Bulfinch
- 2006: In Character: Actors Acting. Bulfinch. ISBN 978-0821229071. With a foreword by Roger Ebert.
- 2007: H2O. Bulfinch
- 2011: With Child. Glitterati Inc
- 2012: At The Fights: Inside the world of Professional Boxing. Sports Illustrated Press
- 2013: Caught In The Act: Actors Acting Glitterati Inc
- 2015: Schatz Images: 25 Years. Glitterati Inc
- 2018: Kink. New York: Lawrence Richard Publishing. ISBN 978-0971021013.
- 2022: Pairs. New York; Lawrence Richard Publishing

=== With others ===
- 1996: Virtuoso. 1996. By Ken Carbone with photographs by Schatz. Stewart Tabori and Chang
