= Niki Taylor =

American model

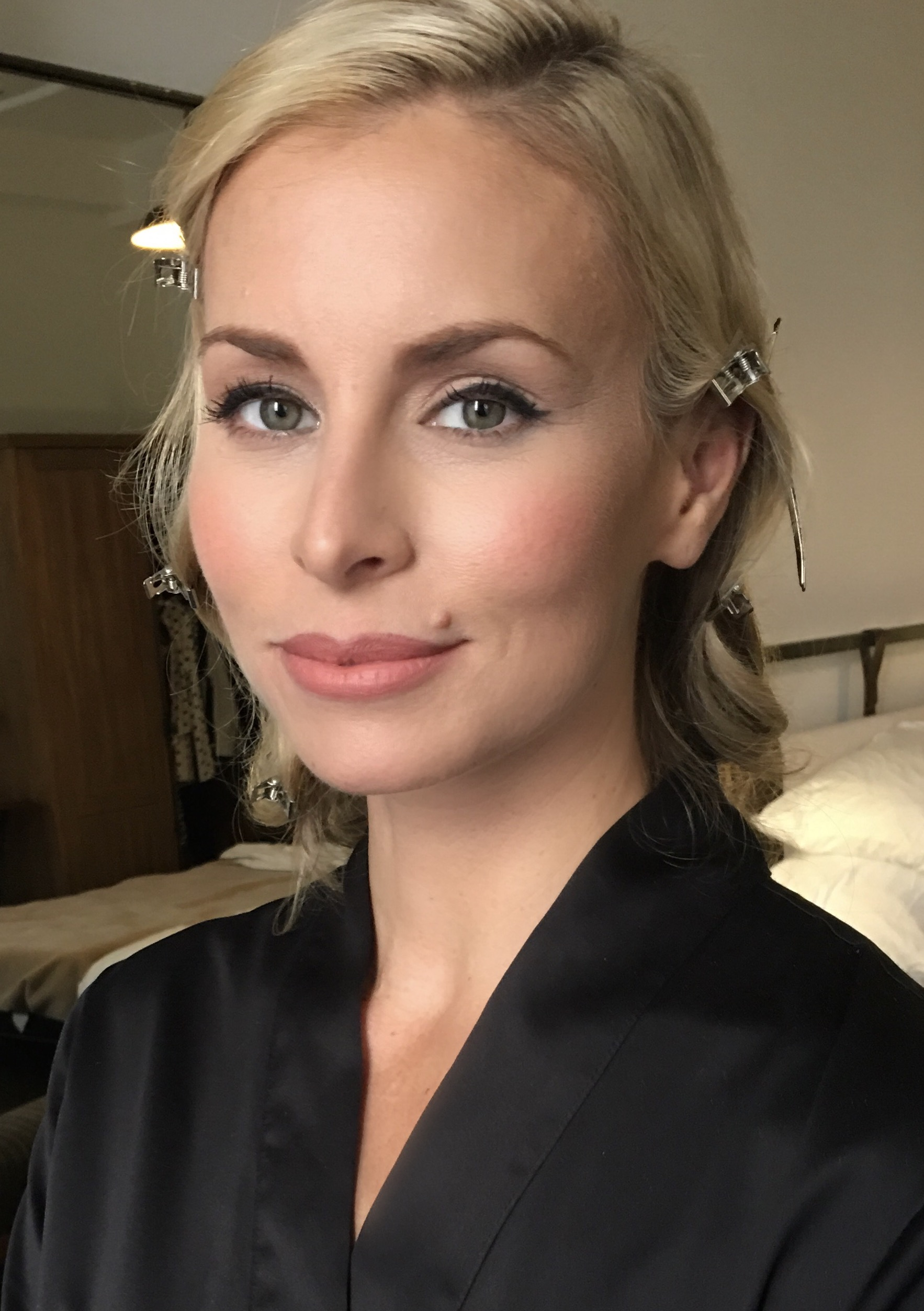
- Taylor in 2017
- Born: Nicole Renee Taylor; March 5, 1975 (age 51); Fort Lauderdale, Florida, U.S.
- Spouses: Matt Martinez (m. 1994; div. 1996) Burney Lamar (m. 2006)
- Children: Four
- Modeling information
- Height: 5 ft 11 in (1.80 m)
- Hair color: Blonde
- Eye color: Hazel
- Agency: One Model Management (New York); d'management group (Milan); Established Models (London); Sutherland Models (Toronto); Visage Management (Zurich)
- Website: nikitaylor.com

Nicole Renee Taylor (born March 5, 1975) is an American model and TV personality.

== Early life ==
Taylor was born in Fort Lauderdale, Florida to Ken and Barbara Taylor, a highway patrol lieutenant and a photographer, respectively. She was raised in Pembroke Pines, Florida; she attended Cooper City High School. She has an older sister, Joelle; she and Joelle had a younger sister, Krissy (1978–1995).

== Modeling career ==
When she was 13, Taylor signed with Irene Marie Models in South Florida. There she met photographer Jean Renard, who later became her manager. She subsequently won a Fresh Faces contest in New York City and a $500,000 modeling contract. Taylor's first magazine cover was an issue of Seventeen (August 1989) at 14. The next year, she was photographed for the cover of Vogue, becoming the second youngest person (at 15) to appear on the cover of the magazine, after Brooke Shields.

In 1991, at age 16, Taylor became the youngest person ever to be featured as one of People magazine's Most Beautiful People. In 1992, Taylor became the first spokesmodel younger than 18 to sign a major contract with CoverGirl, and she became a feature in their national advertising campaign. Other ad campaigns of hers have been for Thierry Mugler, Escada, Liz Claiborne, Jean Paul Gaultier, Versace, Versus, Anne Klein, L'Oréal, Gap, Lee Jeans, and Pantene. Taylor remains the only person to simultaneously have six billboards in NYC's Times Square, three of those having displayed her image continuously throughout the entire year.

In May 1996, Taylor appeared on the covers of the six major American women's fashion and fitness magazines in the same month: Allure, Vogue, Elle, Marie Claire, Self, and Shape. A first in history, it was named the 'Niki Six'. She appeared in the 1997 and 1998 editions of the Sports Illustrated Swimsuit Issue; she was the cover model of the 1998 Sports Illustrated swimsuit calendar. Sports Illustrated released three video segments of her photo shoots, for the years 1997, 1998 and 1999. The 1997 segment was with another model, Naomi Campbell, the 1998 segment was with two other models, and the 1999 segment only featured Taylor.

In September 2016, Taylor began a modeling comeback, shooting covers, editorials, and features for major magazines including Paper, Flaunt, British Vogue, Harper's Bazaar, and American Vogue. She has been photographed for Marc Jacobs and Jennifer Fisher. In September 2017, Taylor earned best dressed titles in Vanity Fair, Vogue, Hello! magazine, and WWD.

In April 2021, Taylor again became the face of CoverGirl after her last contract ended in 2000.

In September 2025, Taylor made a significant return to the runway at New York Fashion Week, headlining the Coolibar Mott50 showcase to promote sun safety.

== Other ventures ==
Outside of modeling, Taylor was once an interviewer for segments of the syndicated program Lifestyles of the Rich and Famous. She covered events for NBC and guest-hosted MTV's Fashionably Loud.

In the fall of 2005, Taylor launched her first fragrance, "Begin by Niki Taylor." She also founded the Begin Foundation for the Advancement of Women in Business. In 2007, Taylor introduced the finalists on friend and co-CoverGirl spokesmodel Tyra Banks's talkshow. Taylor and male model Tyson Beckford co-hosted the new Bravo series Make Me a Supermodel. It premiered on January 10, 2008. Although the show was renewed for a second season, Taylor did not return as co-host since she was pregnant during the filming of the second season.

Taylor became a contestant on the fourth edition of The Celebrity Apprentice on March 6, 2011. In the first task, Taylor was considered the star performer by her team, and was rewarded $35,000 for her charity (American Red Cross) because of her efforts. On March 20, she became the third person to be fired. She returned for the May 1, 2011 episode to help the men's team, Team Backbone, in a Hair Show Task.

== Personal life ==
After meeting in 1993, she married Miami Hooters linebacker Matthew Martinez. Their identical twin sons Hunter and Jake were born in December 1994. In 1996 the couple divorced.

In October 2006, Taylor became engaged to NASCAR driver Burney Lamar after just three dates. They met at an autograph session in January 2006. Their wedding was on December 27, 2006, at the Grande Colonial Hotel in La Jolla, California. Instead of gifts, the couple asked for donations to be sent to Victory Junction Gang Camp, a camp for chronically ill children in North Carolina.

Taylor and Lamar's first child together, a daughter, was born on March 4, 2009. On November 16, 2011, Taylor gave birth to her second child with Lamar, a son.

Taylor continues to appear at fashion events.

Taylor lives with her husband, daughter, and sons in a French colonial house on 7 acres (28,000 m^{2}) in Brentwood, Tennessee.

On January 22, 2025, Taylor became a grandmother after her son Hunter had a son, Nico Martinez.

=== Health struggles ===
On April 29, 2001, Taylor was critically injured in a car accident in Atlanta. The driver, her then-boyfriend Chad Renegar, was attempting to answer his cell phone when he lost control of the car and smashed into a utility pole. Taylor was wearing her automatic shoulder belt at the time and she was not thrown from the vehicle. However, she suffered severe internal injuries, including a collapsed lung and serious liver damage; two steel rods had to be implanted in her back holding her spine together. The accident left her unconscious and in a coma for six weeks and then bedridden for an additional month. She was treated at Grady Memorial Hospital in Atlanta; she had approximately 56 operations and substantial physical therapy.
