= Catherine Malandrino =

French fashion designer (born 1963)

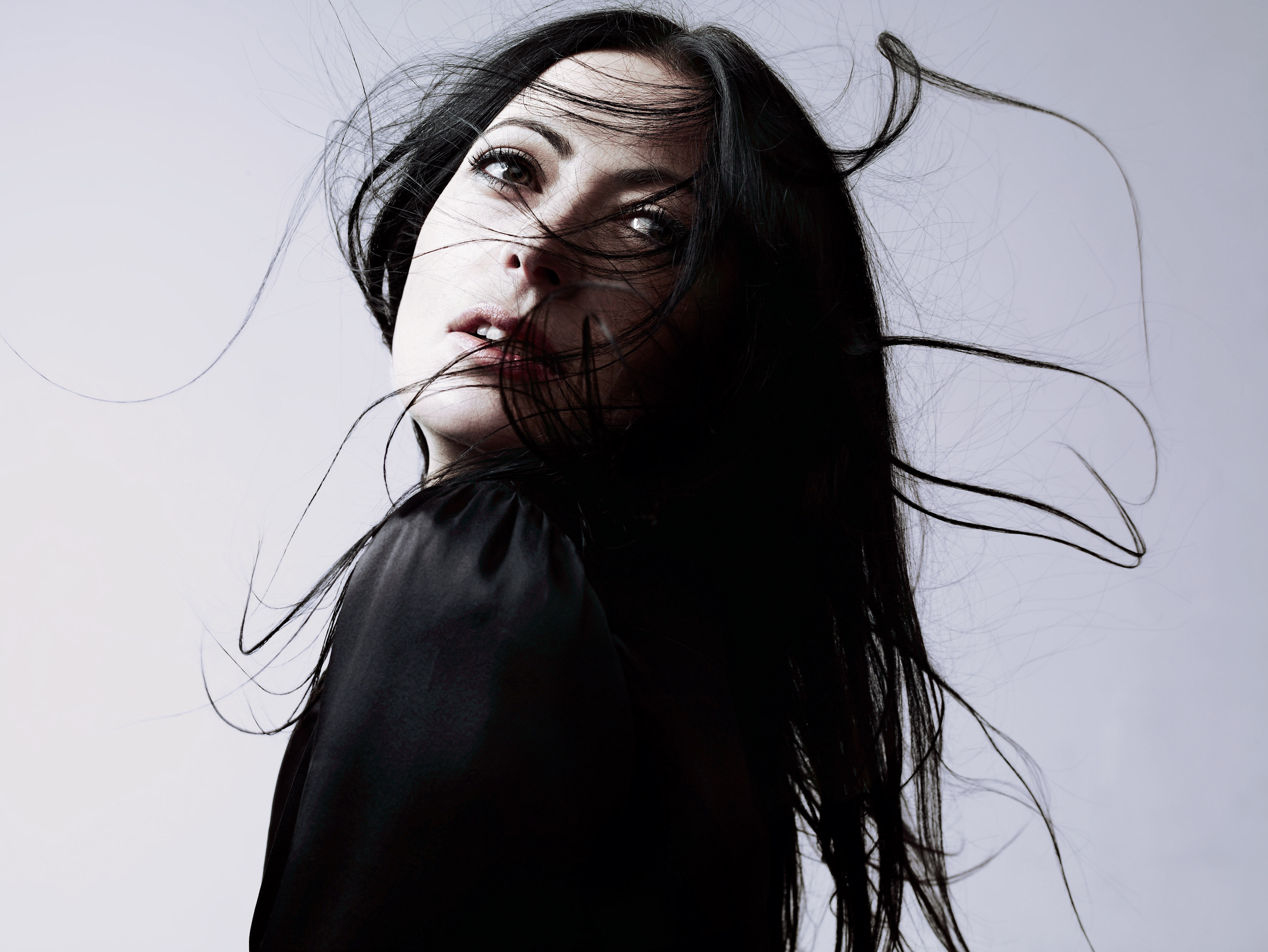
- Catherine Malandrino - fashion designer
- Born: Grenoble, France
- Occupation: Fashion designer

Catherine Malandrino is a French fashion designer. She resides between New York City and Paris.

== Early life and education ==
Malandrino was born in Grenoble in the French Alps to Italian parents. She began her professional career in Paris after attending ESMOD.

== Career ==
Malandrino moved from Paris to New York and met with Diane von Fürstenberg, who offered her the position of senior designer and creative director of the HIGH re-launched house.

In 2001 Malandrino created the “Flag Collection”: ultra-feminine, jagged flag dresses inspired by the American flag.

Malandrino has designed collections for Lacoste (2011) and for Kohl's (2013).

== Writing ==
In 2017 Malandrino published the book Une Femme Française.
