= Crack =

Crack frequently refers to:

- Crack, a fracture in a body
- Crack, a fracture (geology) in a rock
- Crack, short for crack cocaine

Crack(s) or The Crack may also refer to:

== Arts, entertainment, and media ==
- The Crack, first album by The Ruts
- Crack (album), an album by Z-RO
- Crack (band), a Spanish progressive rock group
- The Crack (magazine), a free culture magazine covering the North East of England
- Crack (magazine), a UK-based European music and culture monthly
- Crack Movement, a Mexican literary movement
- Cracks (Bendik Giske album), 2021
- Cracks (Nabiha album)
- Crack (film), a 1991 sports drama film
- Cracks (1975 film), an animated short from the children's television program Sesame Street
- Cracks (2009 film), an independent thriller
- Cracks (novel), a 1999 novel by Sheila Kohler
- "Crack", a song by Big Black from Lungs.

== Software ==
- Crack (password software), a UNIX/Linux password hacking program for systems administrators
- Software cracking, a computer program that modifies other software to remove or disable features usually related to digital rights management
- No-disc crack, software to circumvent Compact Disc and DVD copy protection
- Password cracking, the process of recovering passwords from data stored in or transmitted by a computer system
- Security hacker, cracking a system to gain unauthorized access (sometimes mislabeled as "hacking")

== Other uses ==
- CRACK, an acronym for 'Children Requiring A Caring Kommunity', now called Project Prevention
- CRACK International Art Camp
- Crack spread, the value difference between crude oil and oil products or between different oil products, usually expressed as a per-barrel value
- Cracking (chemistry), the process whereby complex organic molecules are broken down into simpler molecules
- Craic, or crack, an Irish term for discourse, news, etc.
- Safe cracking, the process of opening a safe without the combination or the key

== See also ==
- CRAC (disambiguation)
- Crack-Up (disambiguation)
- Cracker (disambiguation)
- Cracking (disambiguation)
- Crak!, 1963 pop art lithograph by Roy Lichtenstein
- Crakk, a 2024 Indian Hindi-language sports action film
- Krack (disambiguation)
- Krak (disambiguation)
