= Cracked =

Cracked may refer to:

== Television ==
- Cracked (British TV series), a 2008 British comedy-drama television series that aired on STV
- Cracked (Canadian TV series), a 2013 Canadian crime drama series that aired on CBC
- "Cracked", a Season 8 (2010) episode of NCIS

== Other media ==
- Cracked (film), a 2024 Mexican documentary
- Cracked (magazine), American humor magazine that ran from 1958 to 2007
- Cracked.com, American humor web site, launched in 2005, associated with Cracked magazine
- Crack'ed, a 1987 video game
- "Cracked", a 2015 song by Pentatonix from Pentatonix

== See also ==
- Crack (disambiguation)
- Cracking (disambiguation)
