= Craker =

Craker is a surname. Notable people with the surname include:

- Chris Craker (born 1959), British clarinetist
- Laurie Craker (1953–2020), English footballer and manager
- Lorilee Craker (born 1968), Canadian American journalist
- Lyle Craker (born 1950), American botanist
