= Raul Silva =

Raul Silva may refer to:

- Raúl Silva Henríquez (1907-1999), Chilean prelate
- Raul Silva (footballer) (born 1989), Brazilian footballer

== See also ==
- Raoul Silva
