= Cracker =

Crackers are a type of biscuit.

Cracker, crackers or The Crackers may also refer to:

== Animals ==
- Hamadryas (butterfly), or crackers, a genus of brush-footed butterflies
- Sparodon, a monotypic genus whose species is sometimes known as "Cracker"

== Computing ==
- Computer cracker, a security hacker who maliciously exploits weaknesses in a computer or network
- Software cracker, a person who uses reverse engineering to remove software copy protections
- Safecracker, a person who breaks open safes, usually to rob them

== Media, arts and entertainment ==
=== Films ===
- Crackers (1984 film), an American film starring Sean Penn
- Crackers (1998 film), an Australian film
- Crackers (2011 film), a Bollywood film

=== Literature ===
- Crackers (Captain Underpants), a comic book character
- Cracker (comic), a British children's comic

=== Music ===
- Cracker (band), an American rock band
  - Cracker (album), the debut studio album by the American rock band Cracker, released on March 10, 1992
- The Crackers, a 1968 pseudonym of the band The Merseybeats
- Crackers: The Christmas Party Album, an album by the British glam rock band Slade
- "Crackers" (song), a 1980 song by Barbara Mandrell

=== Television ===
- Cracker (British TV series), a television crime drama series
  - Cracker (American TV series), the American remake of the British television series

== People ==
- Georgia cracker, 19th–20th century cattle drivers of the Georgia plains
- Florida cracker, 19th–20th century cattle drivers of the Florida scrub regions
- Miz Cracker, American drag queen
- Kane Gamble, a British hacker known under the pseudonym Cracka

== Places ==
- Cracker, a mountain peak in Glacier National Park (U.S.), Montana
  - Cracker (benchmark), its benchmark summit

== Other uses ==
- Cracker, a petrochemical industry component used for cracking
- Cracker (term), a derogatory term for a white person
- Christmas cracker, a traditional British Christmas toy or decoration
- Operation Crackers, a British Commando raid during the Second World War
- Atlanta Crackers, an American baseball team from Atlanta, Georgia
- "The Cracker," a railroad train of the Southern Railway operating from Atlanta to Valdosta
- Cracker, a length of twine or string at the end of a whip that produces a cracking sound
- Firecracker, commonly shortened to "cracker" in Indian English

== See also ==
- Atlanta Black Crackers, a professional baseball team which played in the Negro leagues
- Cracking (disambiguation)
- Craker, a surname
