= Sévérine =

Fictional character in the 2012 film Skyfall

- James Bond character
- Bérénice Marlohe as Sévérine
- First appearance: Skyfall (2012)
- Last appearance: Skyfall (2012)
- Portrayed by: Bérénice Marlohe

In-universe information
- Gender: Female
- Occupation: Raoul Silva's representative; Sex slave (former)
- Affiliation: Raoul Silva
- Classification: Bond girl

Sévérine is a fictional character who appears in the 23rd James Bond film Skyfall (2012). Played by Bérénice Marlohe, Sévérine is a former sex slave who works as an accomplice of Raoul Silva (Javier Bardem). She collaborates with James Bond (Daniel Craig) to stop her boss, but is captured and killed by Silva.

Marlohe had secured the role after two auditions for director Sam Mendes and casting director Debbie McWilliams. She looked to Xenia Onatopp (Famke Janssen), the female villain of the 1995 Bond film GoldenEye, as a point of inspiration for her performance. Distancing herself from the Bond girl title, she interpreted the character as more modern and realistic. Costume designer Jany Temime designed Sévérine's wardrobe using concepts from film noir as well as contemporary fashion, with close attention paid to the black dress she wears when meeting Bond in a Macau casino.

Following Sévérine's first appearances in promotional materials for Skyfall, film critics noted that the character was a return to the classic elements of the James Bond films, specifically Bond meeting a beautiful and mysterious woman. Critics had a mixed response to Sévérine when compared to previous Bond girls. Reception to Bond's treatment of Sévérine was largely negative; commentators panned Bond's seduction of the character after discovering that she was a former sex slave, and his cold response to her death. However, some critics defended Sévérine's story arc as appropriate for Bond's character development. The character has also been a topic of racial analysis.

== Role ==
Sévérine (Bérénice Marlohe) first encounters James Bond (Daniel Craig) while on an assignment in Shanghai. She leads an art dealer (Dave Wong) to a large window to position his assassination by the mercenary Patrice (Ola Rapace). After the dealer is killed, Bond confronts Patrice about his employer, but does not receive an answer before the assassin falls to his death. Sévérine and Bond exchange a glance, and Bond takes the payment intended for Patrice, a token for a casino in Macau.

Sévérine greets Bond on his arrival at the casino. They share a drink at the bar, and Bond presses her for more information about her boss Raoul Silva (Javier Bardem). Identifying her wrist tattoo as the mark of the Macau sex trade, Bond deduces that she was once a sex slave and was taken in by Silva to work as his representative under the guise of being "rescued". (Note: To pass China's censorship laws, references to prostitution were removed from the subtitles. Sévérine's tattoo was changed from a symbol of a Chinese sex trafficking operation to that of a gang.) Promising to help her escape from Silva and to kill him, Bond asks for Sévérine to arrange a meeting with her boss. She trusts him and warns him about her guards' intentions to kill him by throwing him into a pit with komodo dragons. She tells Bond that if he survives, he can find her on her yacht, the Chimera.

Bond dispatches Sévérine's guards and sneaks aboard her boat. After he joins her in the shower, the two have sex. While approaching Silva's base on an abandoned island, a frightened Sévérine tells Bond that it is not too late to retreat. However, they are taken prisoner by the guards and escorted through a crumbling city on the island. Sévérine is separated from Bond, and Silva's men beat her as punishment for her betrayal. Silva interrogates Bond and takes him to a courtyard, where Sévérine is bound to a statue. Setting a shot glass of Scotch whisky on her head, Silva challenges Bond to a game of William Tell. Bond takes the first turn, missing both the target and Sévérine; Silva then shoots her in the head, killing her.

== Development ==
=== Casting and characterization ===
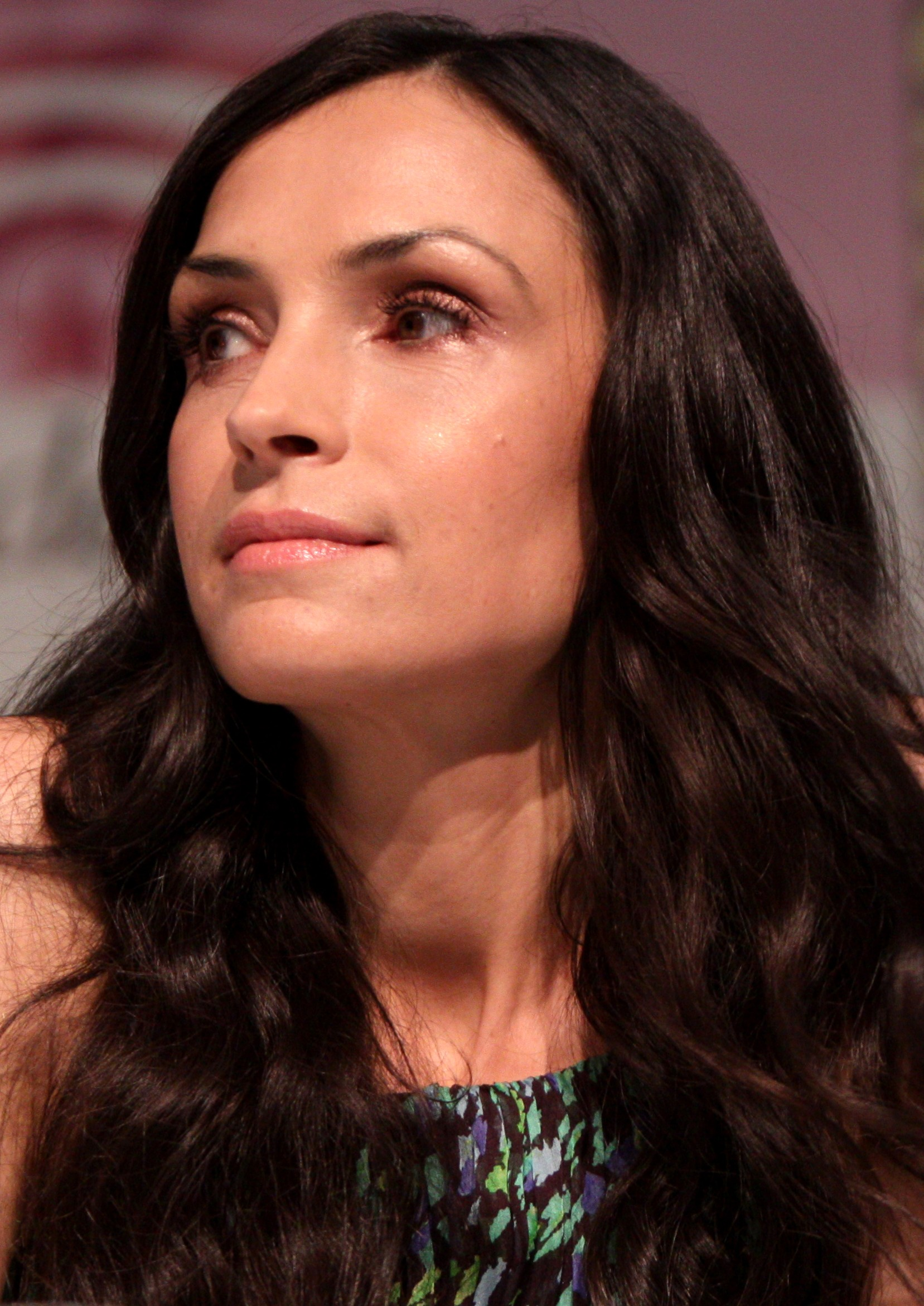
Bérénice Marlohe looked to Famke Janssen's (pictured in 2013) performance as Xenia Onatopp in the Bond film GoldenEye as inspiration for her character.

Sévérine is portrayed by French actress Bérénice Marlohe. After hearing about a casting call for Skyfall in Paris, Marlohe contacted the movie's director Sam Mendes through Facebook, and emailed her acting reel to the casting director Debbie McWilliams. Six months prior to her James Bond audition, Marlohe stated that she had a dream about acting alongside Javier Bardem and interpreted it as a positive sign that she would get the part. She auditioned twice for the role, first for McWilliams and then for Mendes. Marlohe was one of several French actresses to play a Bond girl. (Note: Other French actresses that played Bond girls included: Carole Bouquet, Claudine Auger, Sophie Marceau, and Eva Green.) British actress Gemma Chan also auditioned for the part. Following the film's release, Marlohe identified the role as a transition in her career as it led to further acting opportunities, and her decision to hire a Hollywood talent agent.

A fan of James Bond films, Marlohe said that "you can feel a lot of freedom in creation [of a character] because it is a world between reality and imagination". She was more intrigued by the Bond villains, particularly Grace Jones' performance as May Day in the 1985 film A View to a Kill. Marlohe also cited Xenia Onatopp in the 1995 film GoldenEye as her favorite Bond girl, and said she was inspired by Famke Janssen for her approach to Sévérine. When asked about her preference for antagonists, Marlohe responded that she preferred parts that have "elements of whimsy and madness to them". Outside of the James Bond series, she found inspiration for her portrayal of the character's psychological instability from Heath Ledger's performance as the Joker in the 2008 film The Dark Knight.

Marlohe based her performance as Sévérine around the mythological chimera, choosing to emphasize a sense of "dangerousness spreading through [the character]". When asked to define the traits of a Bond girl, she described the role as "a powerful woman with a kind of male charisma and male power" and a "bit of animality". During promotional interviews, Marlohe advocated for the removal of the title of Bond girl, explaining that she aimed to imagine the character as more modern and realistic; she described the Bond girl as "a beautiful concept but it's a concept, and I wanted to create a real human being".

=== Fashion ===
While creating Sévérine's wardrobe, costume designer Jany Temime aimed to maintain a sense of mystery around the character. She combined film noir designs with contemporary fashion, such as selecting a shift dress from one of L'Wren Scott's 2012 collections for its 1940s silhouette. The designer identified Sévérine through her sexuality, and wanted to showcase the character as "sexy and exceptional and dark" by having her appear as naked as possible.

The backless evening gown that Sévérine wears when she first meets Bond was created from black satin and decorated with 60,000 Swarovski crystals. The crystals were applied to tulle in a tattoo design that was inspired by prints from Swarovski's Paris atelier; they appear on the neckline, arms, back, and the sides of the garment. The dress took six months to complete. Temime designed it based on Rita Hayworth's black dress from the 1946 film Gilda. Designer Stephen Webster created the jewelry for the outfit by looking to modern Gothic style for inspiration. Marlohe said that she also had an influence on the final design of the dress.

It took a long time for Marlohe to get into the outfit with help from the film's crew; she was sewn into one part of it. Despite this, she said she felt comfortable in it. Six different versions of the body of the dress were created to accommodate the filming schedule; Marlohe changed twice a day during the production, and had to be sewn back into the dress each time. She felt that her character's wardrobe allowed her to better situate her performance, referencing the dress as her way of transforming into Sévérine. She interpreted it as resonating with a "feeling of power and the quality of being salvaged" and the long resin nails as showing "part of a dragon in [her character]". Since she had to wear the nails both on and off the set, she felt they helped her stay in character and explained that they "would feed [her] all the time with that feeling of being dangerous". Along with the evening gown, Sévérine also wore a red dress created by designer Donna Karan.

== Critical reception ==
Sévérine was featured in the first preview video for Skyfall, which showed her initial encounter with Bond in the Macau casino. ScreenCrush's Mike Sampson described the preview as reminiscent of those of earlier James Bond films, where Bond introduces himself to an attractive woman. Sampson said the scene's conventional James Bond elements as well as Sévérine's character marked the promotion of Skyfall as a "return to old school Bond [...] with a slightly modern feel". The character and the black dress featured in one of the film's posters. In response to the character's absence from the trailer, Marlohe attributed the decision to keeping her character's storyline a surprise for viewers.

Some critics believed Sévérine fit the general characteristics of a Bond girl. In Moviepilot, Jack Carr cited the character as the franchise's representation of women as sex objects, writing that she will "inevitably wind up dead herself the morning after [...] in a cruel demonstration of instant karma". While reviewing the evolution of the Bond girl, Rothman identified Sévérine as following the trope of the damsel in distress, and Ian Dunt of Politics.co.uk found Bond's seduction of the character adhered to expectations for the franchise. However, Vanity Fair's Jim Windolf noted that unlike previous Bond girls, Sévérine's name was not constructed from a double entendre. John Boone of Entertainment Tonight wrote that she was not as fully realized as Vesper Lynd (Eva Green)'s role in the 2006 film Casino Royale, but felt she was a more promising character than Mary Goodnight (Britt Eklund) from The Man with the Golden Gun (1974) and Octopussy (Maud Adams) from the 1983 film of the same name. In contrast, The New Daily's Susannah Guthrie dismissed Sévérine, along with Strawberry Fields (Gemma Arterton) and Camille Montes (Olga Kurylenko) from Quantum of Solace (2008), as less memorable than previous Bond girls such as Goldfinger's Pussy Galore (Honor Blackman) and Dr. No's Honey Ryder (Ursula Andress).

=== Feminist analysis ===
The story arc involving Bond's treatment of Sévérine has been criticized by media commentators. Bond's seduction of Sévérine after learning about her past as a prostitute was cited by Bustle's Casey Cipriani as an example of the sexism prevalent throughout the Bond franchise. Echoing Cipriani's sentiment, Jeff Bercovici of Forbes found the sequence of Bond having sex with Sévérine and the character's death to be irresponsible portrayals of sex trafficking and violence, noting it is consistent with the "[s]exual hyper-aggressiveness and putting women in harm's way" often seen in Bond films. Skyfall was criticized for contributing to the false idea of "victims of sexual violence [being] sexually available" by National Sexual Violence Resource Center director Tracy Cox. Cox cited Bond as "abusing his power and authority" through his interactions with Sévérine. The Frisky's Julie Gerstein argued that Bond's expectation that Sévérine would have sex with him in return for freeing her is a form of "transaction" that places her as a prisoner of both Bond and Silva. Psychoanalyst Heather Genoves also responded negatively to the sex scene, writing that it was "rather tacky to then put that into a sex-trafficking narrative". On the other hand, The Atlantic's Noah Berlatsky found the conversation between Sévérine and Bond about her past as a sex slave to be the film's most successful scene, and praised the performances of both actors. However, Berlatsky was critical of Bond's subsequent seduction of the character.

Critical response to Sévérine's death sequence was also negative, specifically to Bond's comment following Sévérine's death—"Waste of good scotch". Jade Budowski of The Tribeca Film Institute described the scene as "unpalatable", and wrote that she "sense[d] it in the shifting of some of my neighbors in the theater," specifically after the delivery of Bond's line. She argued that the sequence returned to the franchise's earlier treatment of women as "expendable figures" viewing them only as "sex objects, eye candy, and plot devices". Berlatsky argued that Sévérine existed for the sole purpose of "lend[ing] weight to Craig's perspicuity, sexiness, and imperviousness". Paste's Kenneth Lowe found Bond's behavior toward women to be negative, citing Sévérine's death as a prominent example.

Some critics defended the scene as appropriate for Bond's character development. While HuffPost's Daniel Wood felt that the Sévérine was killed too early in the film, he associated her death with the removal of the "harmless chauvinism" starting from Casino Royale, and better represented Bond as an emotionally deficient character. Wood acknowledged that the portrayal of female characters as "commodities" was negative, but argued it suited Bond's characterization. James Peaty of Den of Geek! interpreted the moment as purposefully unexpected in order to show the audience "how out of sorts Bond has become and that perhaps the greatest threat he faces this time out is his own inertia and ineptitude" and shift the film's focus to M (Judi Dench).

=== Racial analysis ===
Gender studies scholar Lisa Funnell was critical of Sévérine as a character, arguing she was marked as the Asian other. Due to the film's focus on her black evening gown, make-up, and nails, Funnell said Skyfall represents Sévérine as a Dragon Lady to establish an expectation she would be a larger part of the story. While addressing this set-up, she likened Sévérine to Aki (Akiko Wakabayashi) and Kissy Suzuki (Mie Hama), both from You Only Live Twice (1967) since they all adhere to the racial stereotype of the "tragic Lotus Blossom", a term that she defined as a "submissive and industrious figure who is eager to please the white male hero". To support this assessment, she pointed to Sévérine's lack of agency or impact on Skyfall's main narrative, and summed up Sévérine as "one of the most disempowered, pitiful, and tragic women in the Bond film franchise". In comparison to her positive perception of Wai Lin (Michelle Yeoh) in the 1997 film Tomorrow Never Dies, Lisa Funnell dismissed Sévérine as based on outdated ideas.
