= Revolt (film) =

2017 science fiction action film

- Theatrical release poster
- Directed by: Joe Miale
- Written by: Rowan Athale; Joe Miale
- Produced by: Rory Aitken; Nicolas Chartier; Zev Foreman; James Harris; Brian Kavanaugh-Jones; Ben Pugh
- Starring: Lee Pace; Bérénice Marlohe; Jason Flemyng
- Cinematography: Karl Walter Lindenlaub
- Edited by: Evan Schiff; Vincent Tabaillon
- Music by: Bear McCreary
- Production companies: Voltage Pictures; 42; Tea Shop Productions
- Distributed by: Vertical Entertainment
- Release dates: July 1, 2017 (Japan); November 17, 2017 (United States)
- Running time: 87 minutes
- Country: United States
- Language: English
- Budget: $4 million
- Box office: $24,416

Revolt is a 2017 American science fiction action film directed by Joe Miale. It was written by Miale and Rowan Athale, starring Lee Pace, Bérénice Marlohe and Jason Flemyng.

== Plot ==
An American Special Forces soldier, serving in Kenya, suffers memory loss after being knocked unconscious during a battle with highly electrified bipedal robotic machines. He later wakes up in a jail cell wearing tattered fatigues and unaware of anything but memories of intense pain. He meets Nadia, a French foreign aid military doctor in the adjacent cell who tells him he "sounds American" and they were taken prisoner by a gang of xenophobic thugs. She calls him "Bo" after seeing the letters on his torn name tag. Nadia explains to Bo that the world had been invaded by alien machines which wiped out all the major cities and now systematically hunt down survivors.

After escaping the jail cell, Bo decides to make his way to a U.S. military base somewhere near Nairobi. Nadia unenthusiastically joins him. Bo only recalls fragments of what happened to him while discovering his ability to absorb, conduct, and discharge electricity. Upon escaping attacking Kenyan soldiers who believe America must be controlling the "drones" since the enormous satellite dishes at the US base are still intact while everything else is destroyed. Bo and Nadia are captured by soldiers who use them as human bait for a failed machine killing operation. At the mercy of three machines, Bo and a hidden Nadia are inexplicably spared while the machines pursue a fleeing soldier on a motorcycle. Bo and Nadia encounter a fatally wounded photojournalist. The photojournalist passes on his camera to Bo telling him to follow the photos ("digital breadcrumbs") as a way to the U.S. military base, which he had encountered and photographed on his journey. The camera proves to be useful until its batteries die.

Bo and Nadia resume their journey to the US base. While in an open field, they see an army of machines heading their way. Bo and Nadia enter a solitary dwelling in the field and flee to the basement, where they embrace and await their demise. In the following scene, Bo is alone and injured, as he staggers to the military base, only to find it in ruins. He sets out to Nairobi, but collapses from his wounds. Saved by a group of Nairobi resistance fighters, he is nursed to health in an underground command center. His story, that his life had been spared but that Nadia had been taken by the alien machines, is met with skepticism. Bo is taken to Roderick (Wandile Molebatsi), who reveals that the aliens gather humans together and transport them to a hovering mothership, and when that happens, the mothership might be vulnerable to attack.

Roderick reveals a plan to detonate an EMP bomb near the mothership in order to bring it down and hopefully deactivate the machines it powers or controls. Bo observes Roderick's collection of sketches of the invaders, and upon viewing one drawing that depicts a machine holding a captive in the air, he remembers that he too had been seized by a machine and implanted with a device in his spine, which had caused the amnesia and also gifted him with his electrical abilities. Resistance scouts reveal the machines have returned in force. Bo is likely a beacon for the invaders, kept alive for the purpose of finding fellow humans for the machines to kill or take captive. Angry resistance fighters threaten to kill Bo then and there, and he offers to leave to draw away the invading machines. However, as the machines already know the location of the underground bunker of the resistance, the inhabitants are forced to evacuate. Bo offers to help Roderick take the EMP bomb to the alien mothership through service tunnels.

Joined by a team of resistance fighters, Bo and Roderick carry the device through the tunnels and are attacked by infiltrating machines. They arrive at a location where the machines are herding humans and slaughtering those who try to escape. Bo attacks one of the machines in the ring surrounding the group of humans, and the opening creates an opportunity for the captive humans to flee while giving the resistance a chance to push the EMP bomb beneath the mothership. Although the power source of the bomb is damaged in the ensuing melee, Bo is able to use his own body as a conduit for electricity to power the bomb and detonate the device, which destroys the mothership and depowers the machines in Nairobi. In the concluding scene, a recuperated Bo reveals his memories have returned. He is asked for his name, and he chooses to be called simply "Bo."

== Cast ==
- Lee Pace as Bo.
- Bérénice Marlohe as Nadia. She was cast by Miale himself. Miale recalls spending four hours together at a coffee table, making it a simple and straight forward decision for him.
- Jason Flemyng as Stander.
- Sibulele Gcilitshana as Kara
- Wandile Molebatsi as Roderick
- Sekoati Sk Tsubane as Juma
- Leroy Gopal as Jeandre
- Welile Nzunza as Cedric
- Patrick Bakoba as Kenyan Captain
- Tom Fairfoot as Lieutenant Smalls
- Ben Tjibe as Lookout
- Chantal Herman as Female Medic
- Barileng Malebye as Young Soldier
- Jabulani Mthembu as Poacher 1
- Batsile Ramasodi as Poacher 2
- Phoenix Baaitse as Father
- Bethel Dube as Daughter
- Reabetsoe Machepha as Smallest Boy
- Kenneth Fok as Asian Journalist
- Alan Santini as Soldier one
- Edwin Jay as Soldier
- Noko "Flow" Mabitsela as Kenyan boy
- Barileng Malebye as Young Kenyan soldier
- Ingmar Büchner as Soldier
- Carl Roddam as Soldier
- Steven Ward as Soldier two

== Development ==
=== Pre-production ===
Originally titled as Prisoner of War, Revolt entered pre-production with an enthusiastic Joe Miale (director and co-writer) quoted by Deadline's journalist Mike Flemming Jr. as saying, "Alien war machines have been stomping around in my head for far too long."

Brian Kavanaugh-Jones, the producer for Automatik, along with Zev Foreman and Academy Award-winning producer Nicolas Chartier, producers for Voltage Pictures, expressed enthusiasm for Miale's vision for Prisoner of War. In an interview with Deadline magazine, Chartier said, "We are firm believers in Joe Miale's vision and look forward to establishing a new science-fiction franchise with him.”

Although Miale wanted the film to be shot in Kenya, where the story was set, filming in Kenya proved to be unfeasible. The crew ultimately shot around Johannesburg. Most locations were disused gold mine facilities. Miale expressed his enthusiasm for the locations with Occhi Magazine saying, "The crumbling concrete, chipped paint, and rusted metal is beautiful on camera." He went on to talk about the local electrical storms, pointing out that a lightning bolt that struck in the film was completely real.

Alex Russell was to originally to play Bo but Lee Pace ended up with the lead role for undisclosed reasons.

=== Production ===
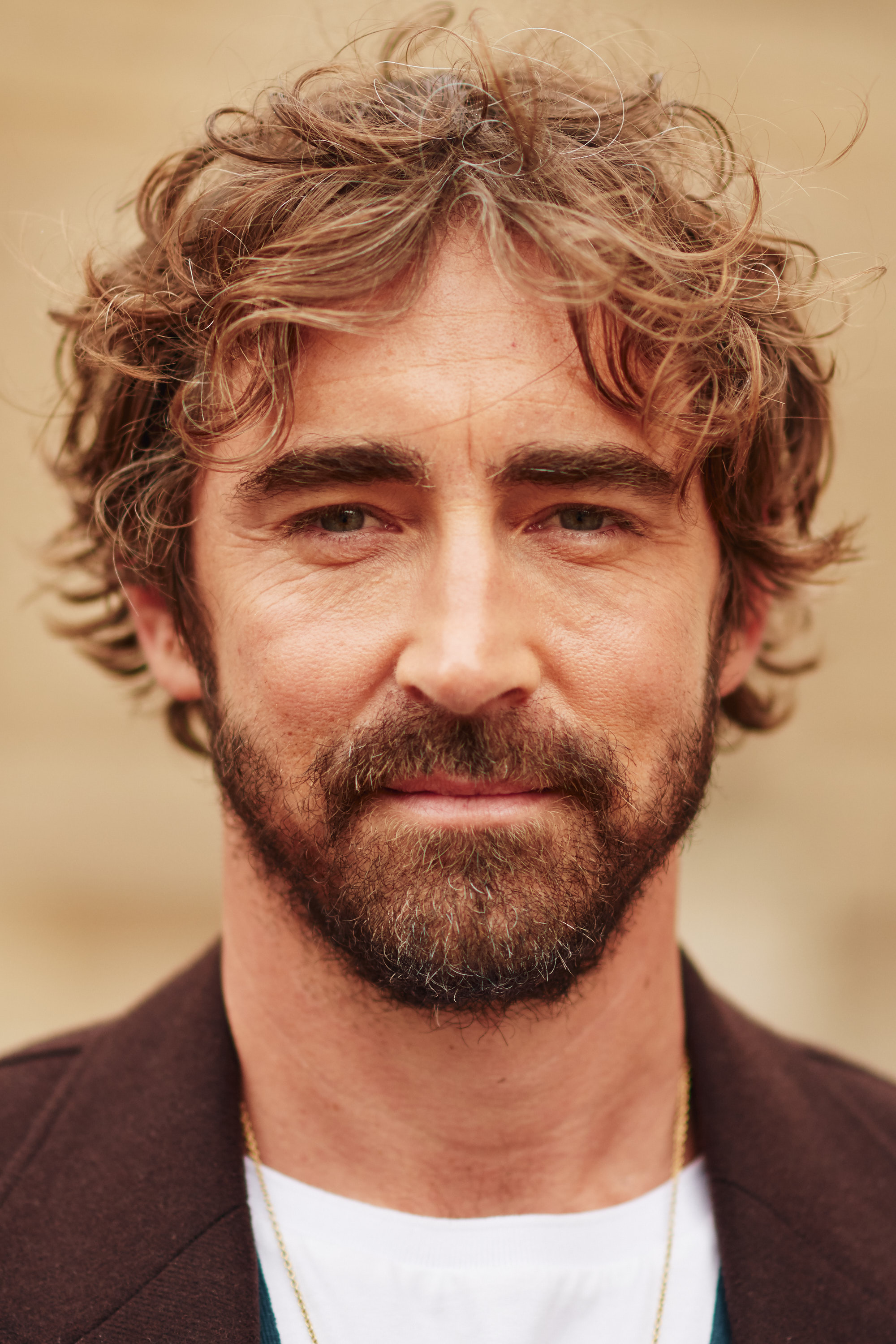
Lee Pace "Bo"

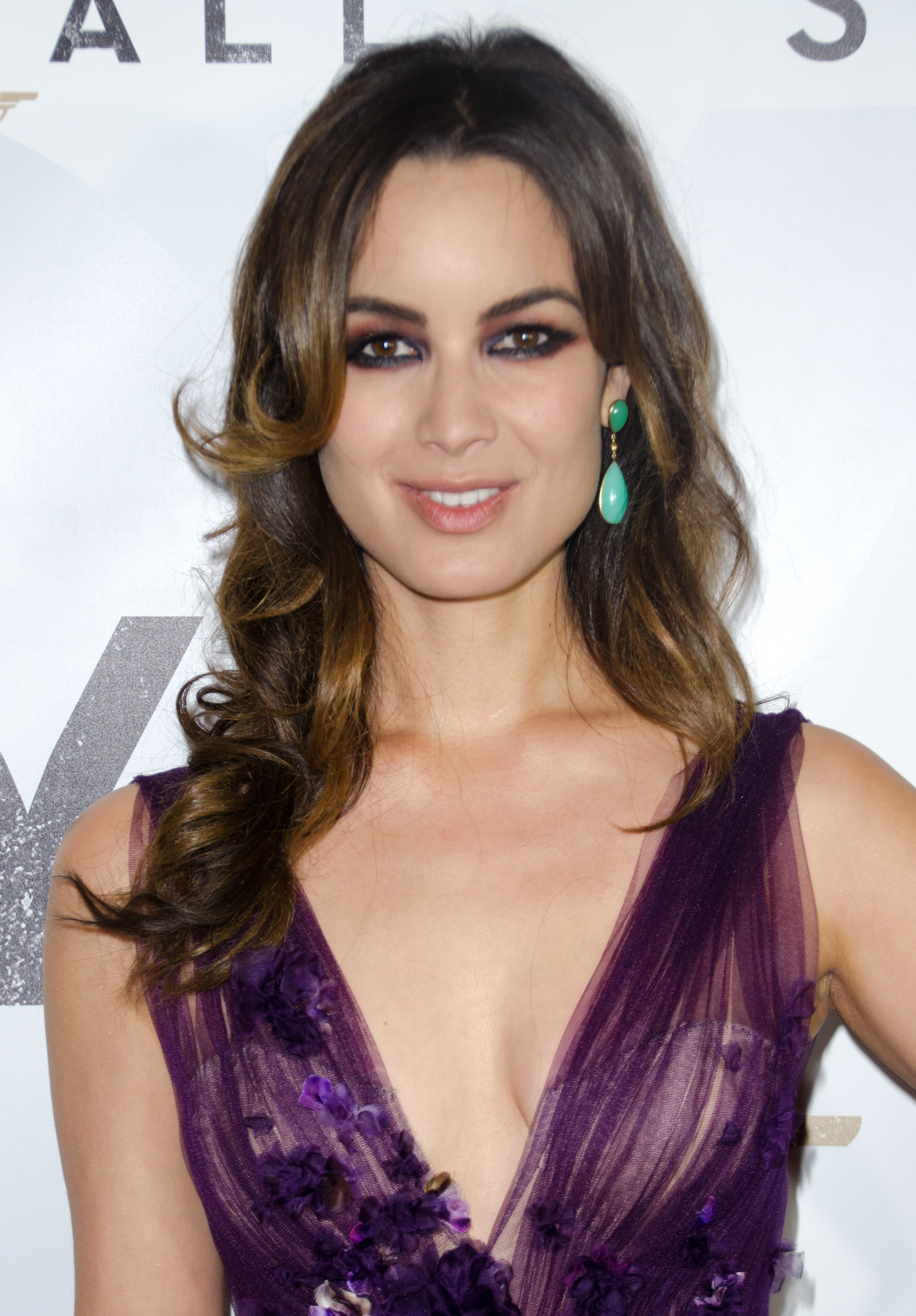
Bérénice Marlohe "Nadia"

Production officially kicked off in September 2014 on site in Johannesburg, South Africa. Only a handful of people were flown out to location. Some of those include director Joe Miale, Lee Pace "Bo," Bérénice Marlohe "Nadia," and cinematographer Karl Walter Lindenlaub, best known for his work in Independence Day.

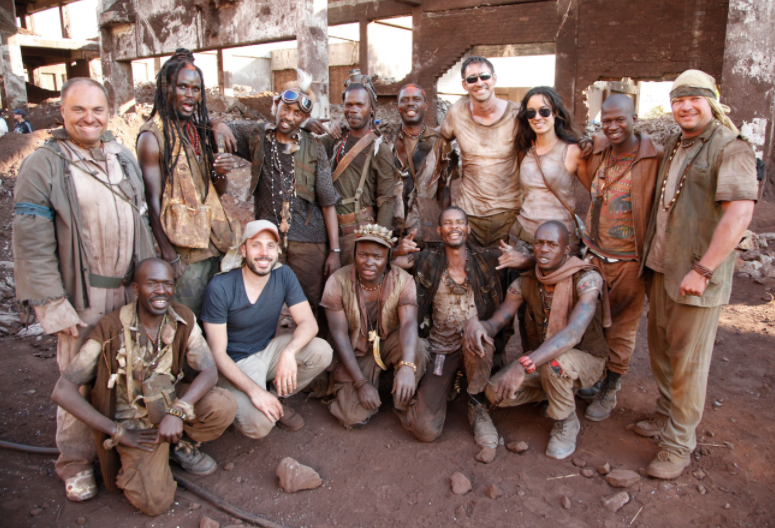
Lee Pace and Bérénice Marlohe with locally cast talent on the set of Revolt

Due to the limited budget of the film, the majority of the cast and crew were locally hired from Johannesburg and Cape Town.

== Reception ==
=== Release ===
The film officially premiered on July 1, 2017, in Japan. It was later released on the web to the Netherlands via streaming on the 6th; in Thailand, the film appeared in theaters on the 27th; in Singapore, the film appeared in theaters on the 28th of September in the same year; and final theatrical appearance in limited locations in the United States on the 17th of November, also in the same year. The film was released in DVD format on the 4th of December 2017.

=== Charity ===
According to The Hollywood Reporter, for the first time in the history of Hollywood, the production companies of Revolt (Voltage Pictures, Automatik, and 42 Productions) launched an Indiegogo campaign for $15,000. The money was used to give back to the generous people of a town near Johannesburg who helped out during production. The companies matched every dollar in the campaign in order to build a football field, drug counseling, a car wash, among other projects.

=== Critical response ===
On Rotten Tomatoes the film has an approval rating of 60% based on reviews from 5 critics.

Gary Goldstein of the Los Angeles Times called the film "a propulsive, no-nonsense sci-fi thriller that's far more watchable than its generic title may imply."

A common theme among reviews was a criticism on the use of many sci-fi clichés while, according to review websites like Frame Rated and Screen Anarchy, still "interesting enough to remain watchable."
