= Raoul Silva =

Fictional character in the 2012 film Skyfall

- James Bond character
- Javier Bardem as Raoul Silva in Skyfall (2012)
- Portrayed by: Javier Bardem

In-universe information
- Alias: Tiago Rodrigues
- Occupation: Cyberterrorist
- Affiliation: SPECTRE (former MI6 agent)
- Classification: Villain
- Henchmen: Patrice; Sévérine

Raoul Silva (born Tiago Rodrigues) is a fictional character and the main antagonist in the 2012 James Bond film Skyfall. He is portrayed by Javier Bardem. A former MI6 agent, he turns to cyberterrorism and begins targeting the agency he used to work for as part of a plan to discredit and kill M (Judi Dench), against whom he holds a homicidal grudge.

== Backstory ==
Skyfall establishes that Raoul Silva's real name is Tiago Rodrigues, a Portuguese national, and that he once specialized in cyberterrorism at Station H, the MI6 station based in British Hong Kong, before Hong Kong was returned to China in 1997. When Rodrigues ignored orders and hacked into the Chinese government's top secret files, the head of Station H, M (Judi Dench), allowed the Chinese to take him prisoner in exchange for the return of six captured agents and a peaceful handover. He was tortured for five months until he attempted suicide by biting into a cyanide capsule hidden in a fake tooth. He survived, but was left disfigured with a misshapen jaw, broken teeth and a sunken left eye socket. He wears a dental prosthetic to hide his disfigurements. He escaped from Chinese custody and reinvented himself as Raoul Silva, a cyberterrorist for hire, and began forming a plan to get revenge against M.

== Skyfall ==
One of Silva's henchmen, Patrice (Ola Rapace), steals a hard drive containing the names and locations of MI6 agents operating undercover within terrorist groups; Silva begins uploading their identities and aliases onto YouTube, resulting in several agents being murdered. Silva then targets MI6 headquarters by sabotaging the building's gas main, causing an explosion that kills several agents.

M sends James Bond (Daniel Craig) to Shanghai to find and kill Silva. Bond seduces Silva's lover, a former child prostitute named Sévérine (Bérénice Marlohe), who promises to take Bond to him in return for her freedom; ultimately, however, Silva intimidates her into betraying Bond. Upon taking Bond captive, Silva forces him at gunpoint to participate in a game of William Tell, in which the target is a shot glass of scotch balanced on Sevérine's head. After Bond misses her, Silva shoots her dead. Bond then kills Silva's men, and, moments later, Royal Navy helicopters arrive to take Silva into custody, having been signaled by an emergency distress radio given to Bond by Q (Ben Whishaw).

At MI6's underground headquarters in London, M confronts Silva, who taunts her that his plan is already in motion. Q attempts to decrypt Silva's laptop, but inadvertently gives it access to the MI6 systems, allowing Silva to escape from MI6 custody. Q realizes that Silva wanted to be captured as part of a plan to kill M.

Silva flees into the London Underground, with Bond in pursuit. When Bond finally catches up to him, Silva detonates an explosive charge that sends a runaway underground train coming straight for Bond, who narrowly escapes. Silva, along with several accomplices, bursts into a government inquiry where M is giving a deposition, but fails to kill her and only injures Gareth Mallory (Ralph Fiennes). Bond arrives and a gunfight ensues, in which he disrupts Silva's plans and flees, taking M with him.

Silva follows Bond and M to "Skyfall", Bond's childhood home in Scotland, where his men open fire, mortally wounding M. He pursues her to a chapel at the side of the house, and begs her to kill them both by firing a bullet through her head and into his. At that moment, however, Bond appears and throws a knife into Silva's back, killing him.

== In other films ==
In the following Bond film, Spectre, Ernst Stavro Blofeld (Christoph Waltz) reveals that Silva had been a member of SPECTRE, a worldwide criminal organization, along with Le Chiffre (Mads Mikkelsen) and Dominic Greene (Mathieu Amalric), the villains of Casino Royale and Quantum of Solace, respectively.

== Sexuality ==
The scene in which Silva and Bond first meet attracted commentary among critics and fans alike for its homoerotic subtext. In the scene, Silva strokes Bond's thighs and chest while interrogating the secret agent, who is tied to a chair.

The scene ignited speculation that screenwriter John Logan, who is gay, intended to imply that Silva is gay or bisexual. Logan denied this in an interview with HuffPost, saying, "Some people claim it's because I'm, in fact, gay but not true at all. [Director] Sam [Mendes] and I were discussing, there were so many scenes in which Bond goes mano-a-mano with the villain, whether it's Dr. No or Goldfinger or whatever, and there's been so many ways to a cat-and-mouse and intimidate Bond, and we thought, what would make the audience truly uncomfortable is sexual intimidation; playing the homoerotic card that is sort of always there subtextually with characters like Scaramanga in Man With the Golden Gun or Dr. No. So we just decided we would play the card and enjoy it."

Producer Barbara Broccoli later admitted there was some pressure to remove this scene from the movie, but she insisted on keeping it in the final release.
