= Krack =

Krack or KRACK may refer to:

- KRACK, an attack on the Wi-Fi Protected Access protocol
- Krack (film), an Indian Telugu-language action film
- Old style spelling of Kraks Forlag, a Danish publisher of maps

== Persons ==
- Erhard Krack (1931–2000), East German politician
- Jake Krack (born 1984), American fiddle player
- Mike Krack (born 1972), Luxembourgish motorsport engineer

== See also ==
- Crack (disambiguation)
