= Skyfall =

2012 James Bond film by Sam Mendes

- British theatrical release poster
- Directed by: Sam Mendes
- Written by: Neal Purvis Robert Wade; John Logan
- Based on: James Bond by Ian Fleming
- Produced by: Michael G. Wilson; Barbara Broccoli
- Starring: Daniel Craig; Javier Bardem; Ralph Fiennes; Naomie Harris; Bérénice Marlohe; Albert Finney; Judi Dench
- Cinematography: Roger Deakins
- Edited by: Stuart Baird; Kate Baird
- Music by: Thomas Newman
- Production companies: Metro-Goldwyn-Mayer; Columbia Pictures; Eon Productions
- Distributed by: Sony Pictures Releasing
- Release dates: 23 October 2012 (London); 26 October 2012 (United Kingdom); 9 November 2012 (United States)
- Running time: 143 minutes
- Countries: United Kingdom; United States
- Language: English
- Budget: $150–200 million
- Box office: $1.109 billion

Skyfall is a 2012 spy film and the twenty-third in the James Bond series produced by Eon Productions. The film is the third to star Daniel Craig as fictional MI6 agent James Bond and features Javier Bardem as villain Raoul Silva, with Judi Dench returning as M. The film was directed by Sam Mendes and written by Neal Purvis, Robert Wade, and John Logan. In the film, Bond investigates a series of targeted data leaks and co-ordinated attacks on MI6 led by Silva. It sees the return of two recurring characters, Miss Moneypenny (played by Naomie Harris) and Q (played by Ben Whishaw), after an absence of two films. Ralph Fiennes, Bérénice Marlohe, and Albert Finney are among the supporting cast.

Mendes was approached to direct after the release of Quantum of Solace in 2008. Development of the film was suspended throughout 2010 after Metro-Goldwyn-Mayer (MGM) filed for Chapter 11 bankruptcy, which caused screenwriter Peter Morgan to leave the project. Production resumed in December 2010 after Purvis, Wade, and Logan were hired and a November 2012 release date was announced in January 2011. Principal photography began that November after the film's title was revealed and lasted until March 2012, with filming locations including London, Shanghai, Istanbul, and Scotland.

Skyfall premiered at the Royal Albert Hall on 23 October 2012, and was released theatrically in conventional and IMAX formats in the United Kingdom three days later and in the United States on 9 November, to coincide with the 50th anniversary of the first James Bond film Dr. No (1962). A critical and commercial success, Skyfall grossed over $1.1 billion worldwide becoming the fourteenth film to pass the billion-dollar mark, the seventh-highest-grossing film of all time at the time of its release, the highest-grossing James Bond film of all time, and the second-highest-grossing film of 2012. The next film in the series, Spectre, was released in 2015.

== Plot ==
In Istanbul, MI6 agents James Bond and Eve Moneypenny pursue mercenary Patrice, who has stolen a hard drive containing details of undercover NATO agents. As Bond and Patrice fight on the roof of a moving train, M orders Moneypenny to shoot Patrice, despite not having a clear shot; Moneypenny inadvertently hits Bond, who falls into a river. Bond is presumed dead and Patrice escapes with the hard drive.

Three months later, due to a public inquiry into M's handling of the stolen hard drive, she is pressured to retire by Gareth Mallory, the chairman of the Intelligence and Security Committee of Parliament and a former SAS officer. However, she remains adamant that she is still useful. On her way back to MI6, MI6's servers are hacked, and M receives a taunting computer message moments before the MI6 building explodes. Bond, who used his presumed death to retire, learns of the attack and returns to service in London. He fails a series of physical, medical, and psychological examinations, but M approves his return to the field, ordering him to identify Patrice's employer, recover the hard drive, and kill Patrice. Bond meets Q, MI6's new quartermaster, who gives him a radio beacon and a Walther PPK pistol.

In Shanghai, Bond follows Patrice and sees him kill a target. They fight, and Patrice dies before Bond can learn his employer's identity. Bond finds a casino token Patrice intended to cash in for the assassination, leading him to a casino in Macau. Moneypenny joins Bond's investigation on Mallory's orders. Bond is approached by Sévérine, Patrice's accomplice. Recognising her tattoo, he concludes she was a sex slave "rescued" by a criminal who now employs her, a man Bond wishes to meet. She warns him he is targeted by her bodyguards, but promises to help if Bond kills her employer. Bond thwarts the attack and joins Sévérine on her yacht. They travel to an abandoned island off the coast of Macau, where the crew captures and delivers them to Sévérine's employer, Raoul Silva. Silva, a former MI6 agent, turned to cyberterrorism and orchestrated the attack on MI6. Silva kills Sévérine. Bond uses Q's radio beacon to alert MI6 reinforcements, who capture Silva for rendition to Britain.

At MI6's new underground headquarters, Q attempts to decrypt Silva's laptop, but inadvertently gives it access to the MI6 servers, allowing Silva to escape. Bond and Q conclude that Silva wanted to be captured as part of a plan to kill M, whom he hates for disavowing and betraying him to the Chinese government during the handover of Hong Kong in 1997, leaving him to be tortured and end up disfigured by a suicide attempt by hydrogen cyanide. Silva escapes his cell and Bond chases him through the London Underground and thwarts Silva's attack at a Parliament inquiry where M is present.

Instructing Q and Bill Tanner to leave an electronic trail for Silva to follow, Bond uses his Aston Martin DB5 to take M to Skyfall, his childhood home in the Scottish Highlands. They meet Skyfall's gamekeeper Kincade, and the trio rigs the house with booby traps. When Silva's men arrive, Bond, M, and Kincade kill most of them, but M is wounded. Silva arrives by helicopter with more men and heavy weapons, so Bond sends M and Kincade through a priest hole to hide in a nearby chapel and rigs propane tanks to explode. As the house and the helicopter are destroyed, Bond escapes down the same tunnel.

Silva survives the destruction of the house, following Kincade and M to the chapel. Confronting M, Silva forces his gun into her hand and presses his temple to hers, begging her to kill them both. Bond arrives and kills Silva by throwing a knife into his back. M then succumbs to her wounds and dies in Bond's arms.

Following M's funeral, Moneypenny formally introduces herself to Bond and tells him she is retiring from fieldwork to become secretary for Mallory, the newly appointed M. Bond meets Mallory and tells him he is ready to get back to work.

== Cast ==
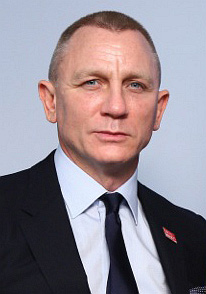
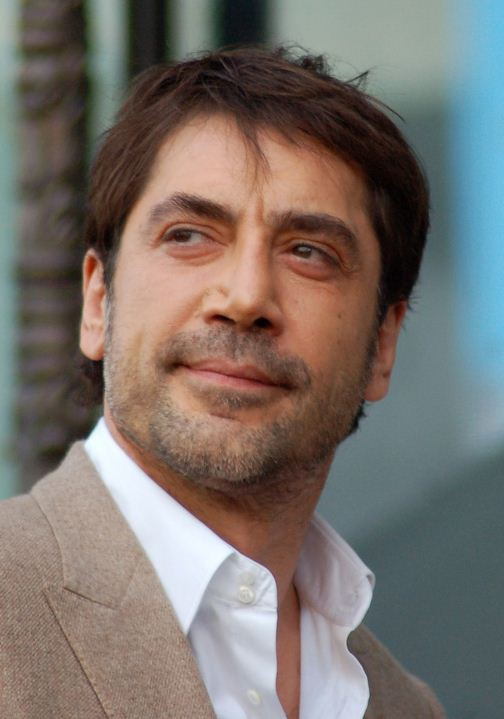
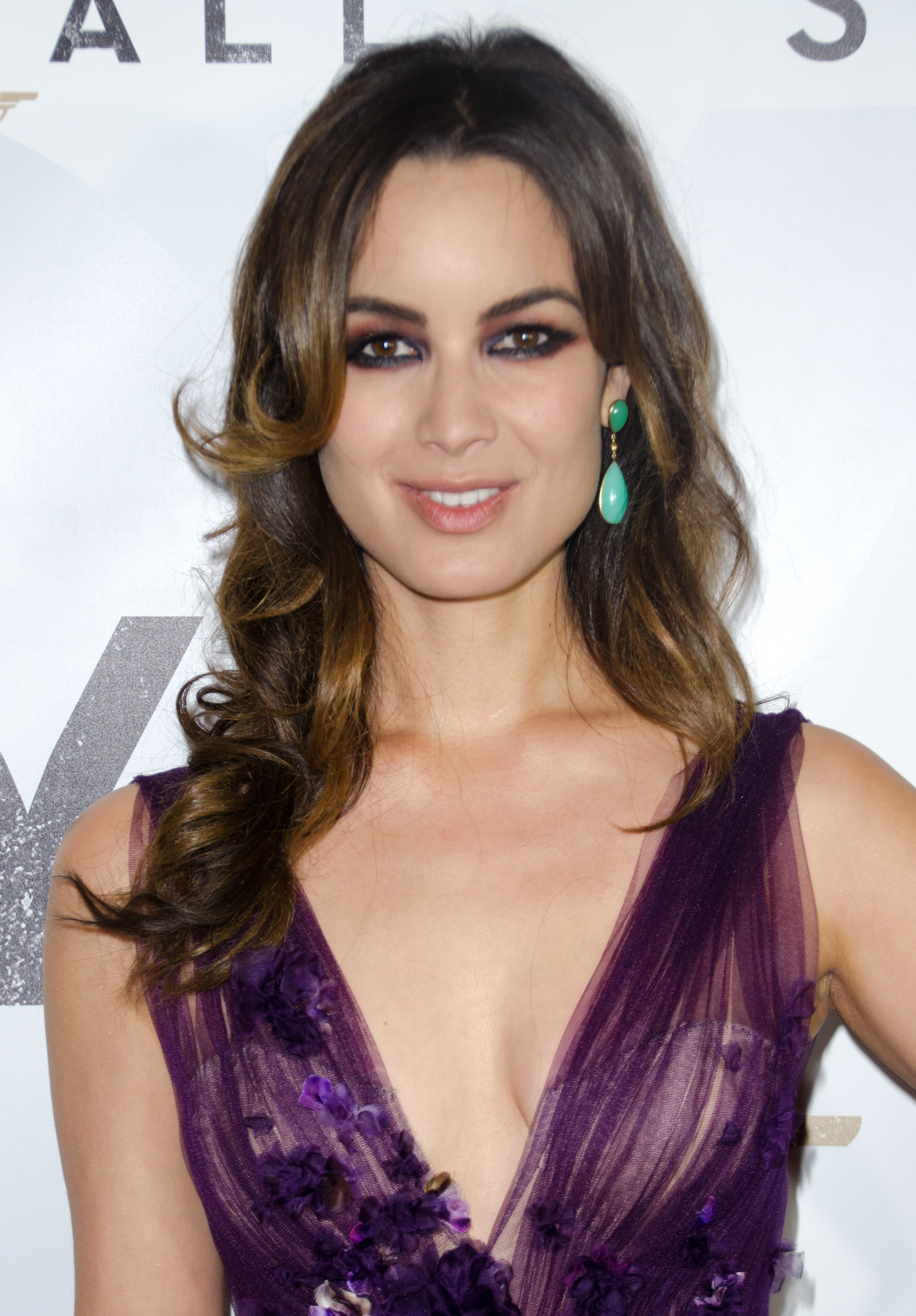
Daniel Craig (left) in 2017, Javier Bardem and Bérénice Marlohe (both in 2012)
- Daniel Craig as James Bond, agent 007
- Judi Dench as M, the head of MI6 and Bond's superior
- Javier Bardem as Raoul Silva (born Tiago Rodriguez), an ex MI6 agent turned cyberterrorist
- Ralph Fiennes as Gareth Mallory, chairman of the Joint Intelligence Committee and a former SAS Lieutenant Colonel
- Naomie Harris as Eve Moneypenny, an MI6 field agent
- Bérénice Marlohe as Sévérine, Raoul Silva's associate and mistress
- Albert Finney as Kincade, the gamekeeper of the Skyfall estate
- Ben Whishaw as Q, the MI6 quartermaster
- Rory Kinnear as Bill Tanner, M's chief of staff
- Ola Rapace as Patrice, a mercenary under Silva's command
- Helen McCrory as Clair Dowar MP

== Production ==
=== Development ===
Development of Bond 23 began in 2009 but was suspended throughout 2010 because of MGM's financial troubles. Pre-production resumed following MGM's exit from bankruptcy on 21 December 2010, and in January 2011, the film was officially given a release date of 9 November 2012 by MGM and the Broccoli family, with production scheduled to start in late 2011. Subsequently, MGM and Sony Pictures announced that the UK release date would be brought forward to 26 October 2012, two weeks ahead of the US release date, which remained scheduled for 9 November 2012. The film's budget is estimated to have been between US$150 million and $200 million, compared to the $200 million spent on Quantum of Solace. Skyfall was part of year-long celebrations of the 50th anniversary of the first Bond film, Dr. No.

=== Pre-production ===
After the release of Quantum of Solace in 2008, producer Barbara Broccoli commented that Skyfall, untitled at the time, may continue the plot of the Quantum organisation, introduced in Casino Royale and continued in Quantum of Solace.

In August 2011, the Serbian newspaper Blic stated that Bond 23 would be titled Carte Blanche and would be an adaptation of the recent continuation novel by Jeffery Deaver. On 30 August, Eon Productions officially denied any link between Bond 23 and Carte Blanche, stating that "the new film is not going to be called Carte Blanche and will have nothing to do with the Jeffery Deaver book". On 3 October 2011, fifteen domain names including jamesbond-skyfall.com and skyfallthefilm.com were reported to have been registered on behalf of MGM and Sony Pictures by Internet brand-protection service MarkMonitor. Skyfall was confirmed as the title at a press conference on 3 November 2011, during which co-producer Barbara Broccoli said that the title "has some emotional context which will be revealed in the film". The title refers to the name of Bond's childhood home, "Skyfall", and the setting for the film's finale.

==== Casting ====
The main cast was announced at a press conference held at the Corinthia Hotel in London on 3 November 2011, fifty years after Sean Connery had been announced as James Bond in the film Dr. No. Daniel Craig returned as James Bond for the third time, saying he felt lucky to have the chance. Mendes described Bond as experiencing a "combination of lassitude, boredom, depression [and] difficulty with what he's chosen to do for a living". Judi Dench returned as M for her seventh and final time.

Javier Bardem was cast as the principal villain, Raoul Silva, a cyberterrorist seeking revenge against those he holds responsible for betraying him. Bardem described Silva as "more than a villain", while Craig stated that Bond has a "very important relationship" to Silva. Mendes admitted that he had lobbied hard for Bardem to accept the part, and saw the potential for the character to be recognised as one of the most memorable in the series. He wanted to create "something [the audience] may consider to have been absent from the Bond movies for a long time", and felt that Bardem was one of the few actors able to become "colourless" and exist as more than just a function of the plot. In preparing for the role, Bardem had the script translated into his native Spanish, which Mendes cited as a sign of his commitment. Bardem dyed his hair blond for the role, after brainstorming ideas for a distinct visual look with Mendes, which led some commentators to suggest a resemblance to Julian Assange. Bérénice Marlohe was cast as Séverine, saved from the Macau sex trade by Silva and now working as his representative. Marlohe described her character as being "glamorous and enigmatic", and that she drew inspiration from GoldenEye villain Xenia Onatopp (played by Famke Janssen).

Ralph Fiennes was cast as Gareth Mallory, a former lieutenant colonel in the British Army and now Chairman of the Intelligence and Security Committee, which regulates MI6. At the end of the film, Mallory becomes the head of MI6, assuming the title of 'M'. During production, Fiennes stated that he could not say anything specific about the role other than that it was a "really interesting part which is really quite fun". Fiennes had previously been considered to play Bond during the casting of GoldenEye. Naomie Harris was cast as the returning character of Miss Moneypenny. Harris's role was initially presented as that of Eve, an MI6 field agent who works closely with Bond. Despite media speculation that Harris had been cast as Miss Moneypenny, this was not confirmed by anyone involved in production, with Harris herself dismissing claims that Eve was in fact Moneypenny. According to Harris, Eve "‍[believes] she is Bond's equal, but she is really his junior". Another returning character was Q, played by Ben Whishaw. Mendes had initially declined to confirm which part Whishaw would play, and later said the idea of the re-introduction was his, saying, "I offered ideas about Moneypenny, Q and a flamboyant villain and they said yes". To play the part of Kincade, Mendes cast Albert Finney. The producers briefly considered approaching Sean Connery to play the role in a nod to the 50th anniversary of the series, but decided not to as they felt Connery's presence would have been seen as stunt casting and might disengage the audience. Skyfall also marked the final film role of Finney before his death in 2019.

==== Crew ====
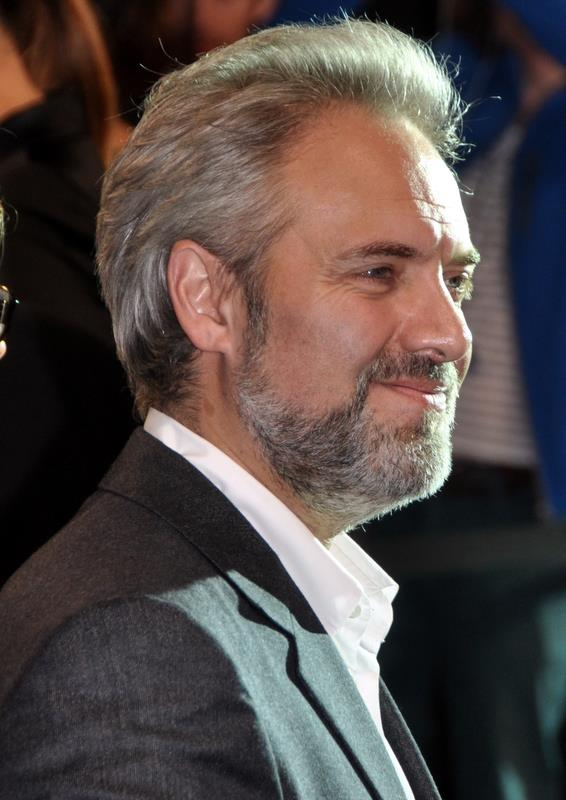
Director Sam Mendes at the film's premiere in Paris, October 2012

Mendes first signed on to direct the project shortly after Quantum of Solace was released, and remained as a consultant during the uncertainty surrounding MGM's financial situation. It was Craig's idea that Mendes should be the next Bond director, as Mendes had previously worked with Craig on Road to Perdition. In 2009, Mendes saw Craig's performance on Broadway in A Steady Rain. Later, at Hugh Jackman's Christmas party, Craig got drunk, encountered Mendes, and offered him the job. The next morning, Craig had to explain to Broccoli: "I think I might have offered Sam Mendes the next movie". Mendes was at first hesitant, as the job had little appeal to him, but he did not reject the offer immediately because of Craig's involvement and enthusiasm; Mendes described Craig's casting and performance in Casino Royale as being what he felt the Bond franchise needed. He agreed to direct after meeting producers Michael G. Wilson and Barbara Broccoli, and seeing the early direction the film was going to take. Media speculation was that Mendes had commissioned rewrites of the script to "[remove] action scenes in favour of 'characterful performances'" with the hope of securing an Academy Award. Mendes denied this, saying that the action scenes were an important part of the film.

Roger Deakins signed on as cinematographer, having previously worked with Mendes on Jarhead and Revolutionary Road. Dennis Gassner returned as production designer, the costume designer was Jany Temime, Alexander Witt was director of the second unit, the stunt co-ordinator was Gary Powell and Chris Corbould supervised the special effects, while the visual effects supervisor was Steve Begg. All had worked on previous Bond films. Daniel Kleinman returned to design the title sequence after stepping aside to allow graphic design studio MK12 to create the Quantum of Solace sequence.

==== Writing ====
Peter Morgan was originally commissioned to write a script, but left the project when MGM filed for bankruptcy and production of the film stalled. Despite his departure, Morgan later stated that the final script was based on his original idea, retaining what he described as its "big hook". Mendes denied this as "just not true", insisting that Morgan's approach had been discarded once he had agreed to direct. Robert Wade later said that "Neal and I were pretty steeped in Fleming. I think Peter was more interested in Le Carré. It just didn't work." Morgan cowrote the treatment Once Upon a Spy with Neal Purvis and Robert Wade, which had M being blackmailed by a Russian oligarch, who would be a former KGB agent she had an affair with while stationed in West Berlin during the Cold War. The script would have ended with Bond being forced to kill M. Mendes disliked most of the script but asked to keep the ending with M's death.

Purvis and Wade then wrote a new script drawing from You Only Live Twice (1964) and The Man with the Golden Gun (1965), in which Bond is presumed dead after an accident and travels back to London to an uncertain MI6. The original screenplay would have more closely followed the literary series' story arc with Bond becoming an amnesiac and unknowingly impregnating his lover Lily in Turkey, who would have tracked him down to London after he returned to MI6. It would have featured Bond tracking down a Francisco Scaramanga-esque villain into the Andes Mountains, and would have had a "Heart of Darkness feel." The screenplay was delayed because of MGM's financial problems. At the end of 2010, Purvis and Wade completed a draft titled Nothing is Forever in which a villain called Raoul Sousa kills M with a bombing aboard the Barcelona Metro and leaves a bureaucrat named Mallender as the new M. They still disliked the third act, and so later revised it to include the ending in Scotland. The final script was rewritten by John Logan, who kept most of Purvis and Wade's basic story. Logan recounted being brought into the project by his long-time friend Mendes, describing the process between Mendes and the writers as "very collaborative", and that writing Skyfall was one of the best experiences he had had in scripting. British playwright Jez Butterworth also provided uncredited contributions.

==== Location scouting ====
In April 2011, Mendes and Broccoli travelled to South Africa for location scouting. With the film moving into pre-production in August, reports emerged that shooting would take place in India, with scenes to be shot in the Sarojini Nagar district of New Delhi and on railway lines between Goa and Ahmedabad. The production crew faced complications in securing permission to close sections of the Konkan Railway. Similar problems in obtaining filming permits were encountered by production crews for The Dark Knight Rises and Mission: Impossible – Ghost Protocol. Permission was eventually granted to the Bond production crew; the production ultimately did not shoot in India.

=== Filming ===
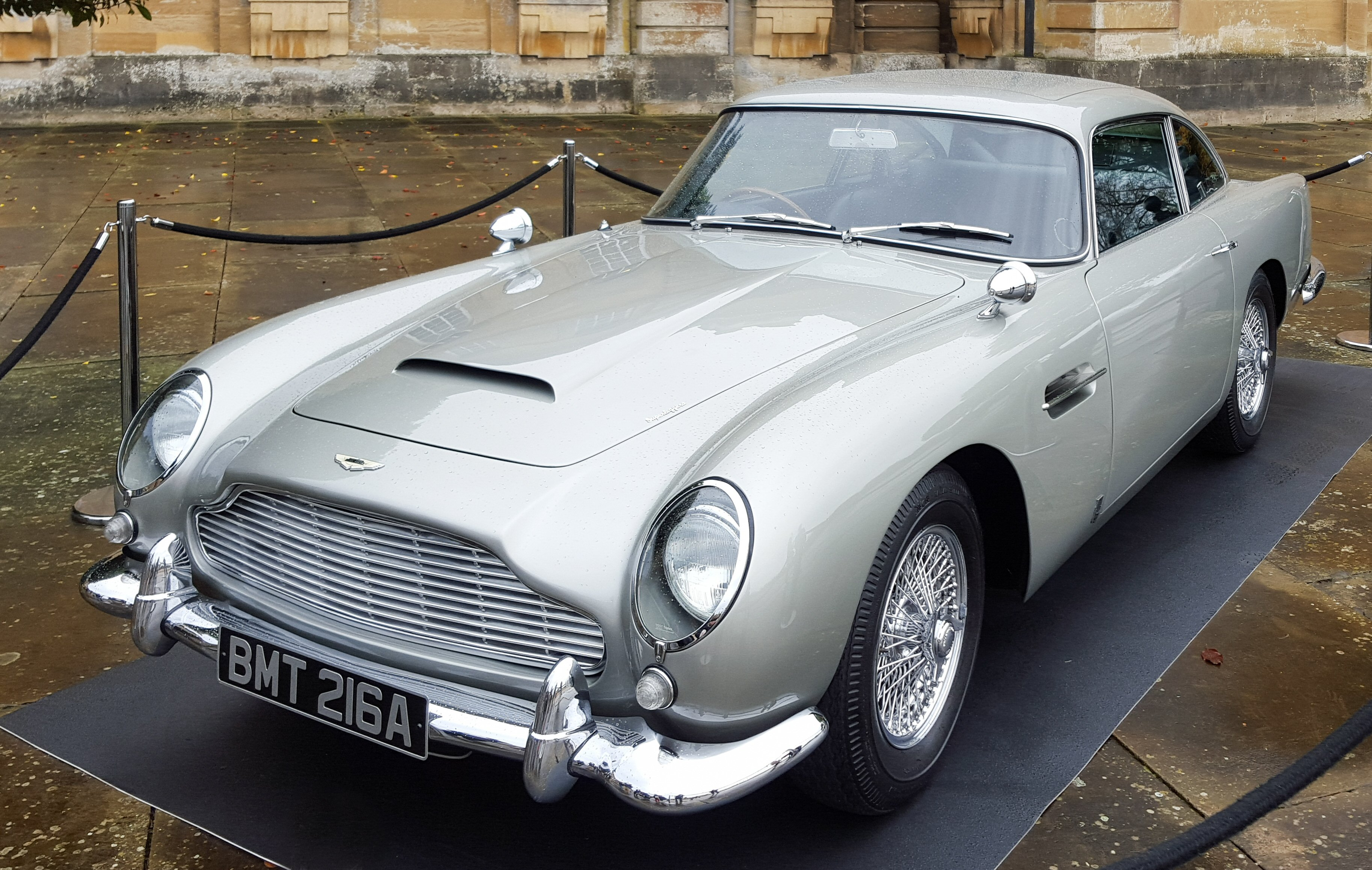
The Aston Martin DB5 featured in the film

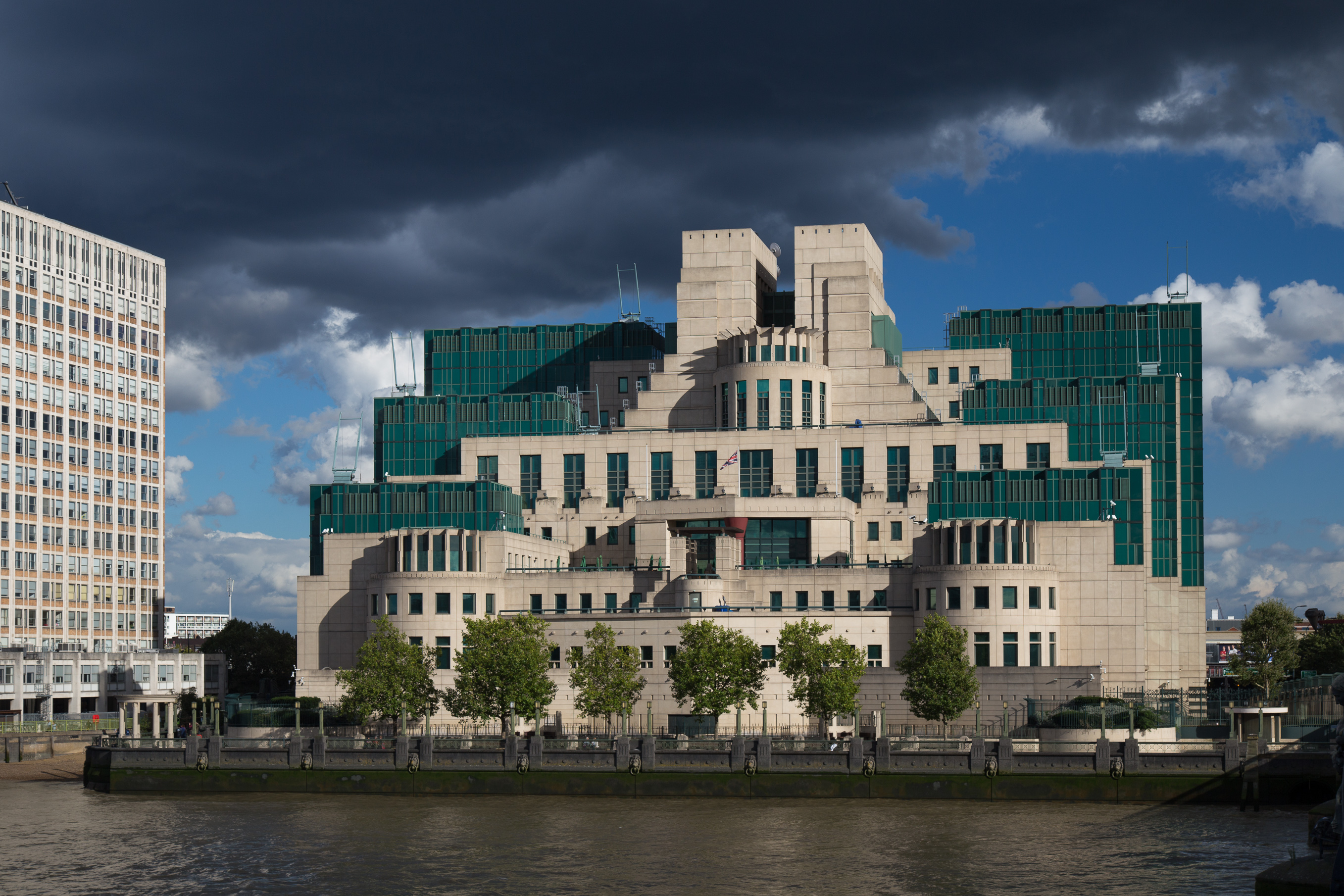
The MI6 Building in London

Principal photography was scheduled to take up to 133 days, although actually took 128. It began on 7 November 2011 in London, with Deakins using Arri Alexa digital cameras to shoot the entire film. It was the first Bond film to be shot digitally. Scenes were shot in London Underground stations, Smithfield car park in West Smithfield, the National Gallery, Southwark, Whitehall, Parliament Square, Charing Cross station, the Old Royal Naval College in Greenwich, Cadogan Square and Tower Hill. St Bartholomew's Hospital was used for the scene in which Bond enters MI6's underground headquarters, while the Old Vic Tunnels underneath Waterloo Station served as the MI6 training grounds. The meeting between Q and Bond was filmed when the National Gallery was closed at night.

The Department of Energy and Climate Change offices were used for the scene near the end, when Bond stands on the roof. Vauxhall Bridge and Millbank were closed to traffic for filming the explosion at the MI6 headquarters at Vauxhall Cross. Unlike for The World Is Not Enough, which featured an explosion at the building filmed at a large-scale replica, this explosion was added digitally during post-production. The finale was planned for Duntrune Castle in Argyll, but shortly after filming began the location was changed to Glencoe. Although supposedly in Scotland, Bond's family home was constructed on Hankley Common in Surrey using a plywood and plaster full-scale model of the building.

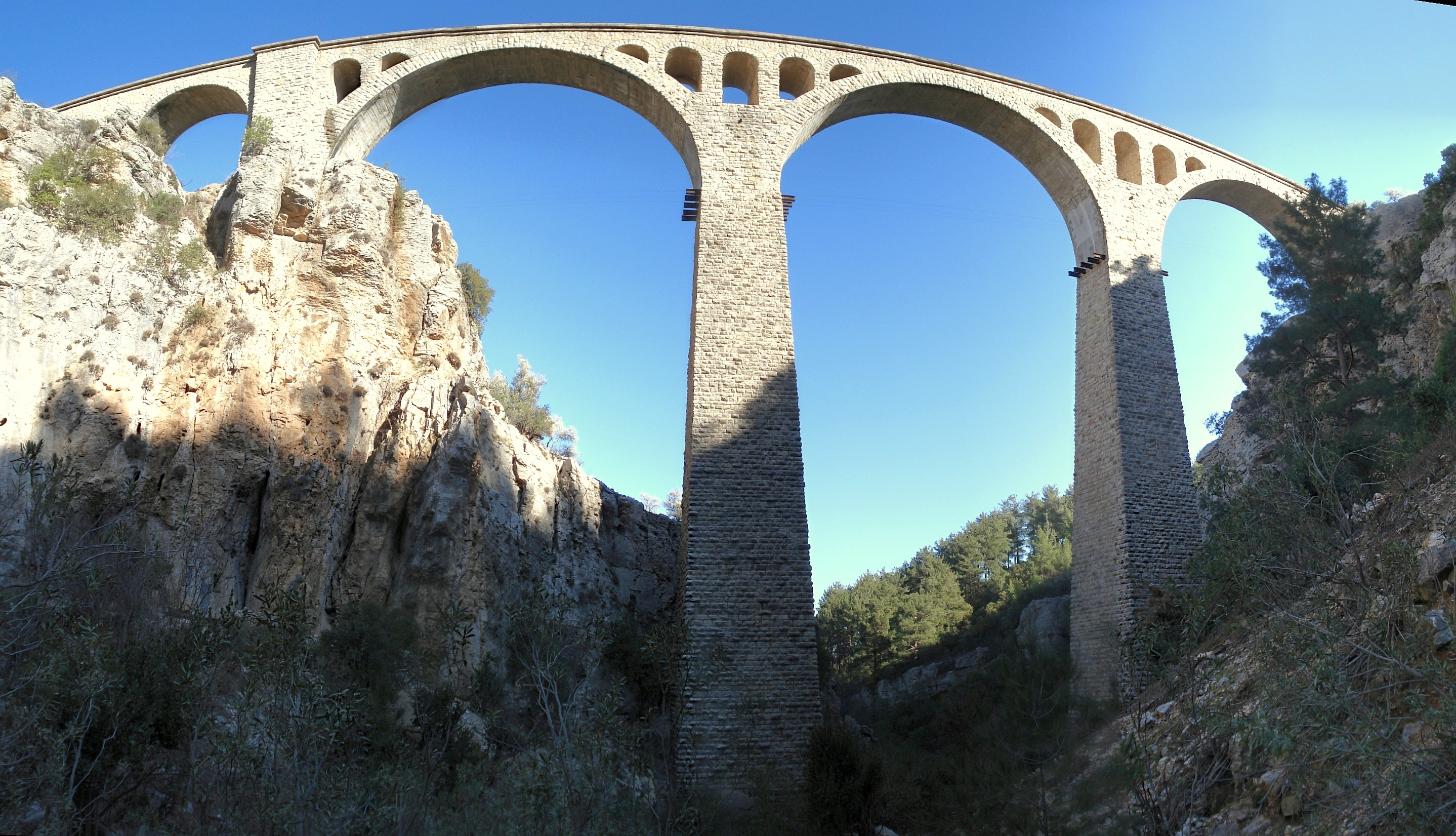
The Varda Viaduct was used for the scene in which Bond is shot.

Production moved to Turkey in March 2012, with filming continuing until 6 May. Adana stands in for the outskirts of Istanbul. Some Turkish teenagers infiltrated a closed set in railway sidings in Adana, during film rehearsals of the fight on top of a train, before they were caught by security. The train scene depicted in trailers showed the Varda Viaduct outside Adana, during which Bond stunt double Andy Lister dived backwards off the 300-foot (91 m) drop, with a crane on a train carriage holding a safety line.

Parts of Istanbul—including the Spice Bazaar, Yeni Camii, the Grand Post Office, Sultanahmet Square and the Grand Bazaar—were closed for filming in April. Affected store owners were reportedly allowed to open their shops, but not allowed to conduct business, instead being paid TRY₺750 ($418) per day as compensation. Production was criticised for allegedly damaging buildings while filming a motorcycle chase across rooftops. Wilson denied this, pointing out that the crew had removed sections of rooftop before filming, and replaced them with temporary replicas. The production team negotiated with 613 part-owners of Calis Beach in Fethiye to film along the coastline.

Mendes confirmed that China would feature in the film, with shooting scheduled for Shanghai and "other parts" of the country. Logan asserted that they deliberately sought locations that were "in opposition" to London, with an exotic quality as "places for Bond to be uncomfortable". Scenes with the principal actors were not filmed on location in Shanghai, but in the UK. The Virgin Active pool in London's Canary Wharf acted as Bond's hotel pool, Ascot Racecourse stood in for Shanghai Pudong International Airport, and London's Broadgate Tower was used as the entrance and lobby of the Shanghai office building. The Golden Dragon casino in Macau was constructed on a sound stage at Pinewood Studios, with 300 floating lanterns and two 30-foot-high dragon heads lighting the set. The production received permission to shoot second unit aerial footage of Shanghai from a helicopter loaned by the Chinese government. The first official image from the film was released on 1 February 2012, showing Craig on set at Pinewood within a recreation of a Shanghai skyscraper.

The lair of villain Silva was inspired by Hashima, an abandoned island off the coast of Nagasaki, Japan. In the film, the fictionalised island is located near Macau. Mendes explained that the sequence was created with a combination of large sets of the city streets and computer-generated establishing shots. The Hashima setting was included after Craig met with Swedish film-maker Thomas Nordanstad while shooting The Girl with the Dragon Tattoo in Stockholm. Nordanstad, who produced a short 2002 documentary on the island entitled Hashima, recalled Craig taking extensive notes during the meeting, but was unaware of his interest in it until Skyfall was released.

The film was later converted into the IMAX format for projection in IMAX cinemas. Deakins was unaware that the film was to be released on IMAX until after he had made the decision to shoot the film with the Arri Alexa cameras, and was unhappy with the IMAX tests made from his footage as the colours "didn't look great". After exploring the IMAX system further and discovering that the IMAX Corporation was using their proprietary re-mastering process, Deakins had further tests made without the process and found that "the images looked spectacular on the big IMAX screen", quelling his doubts about the format.

=== Music ===
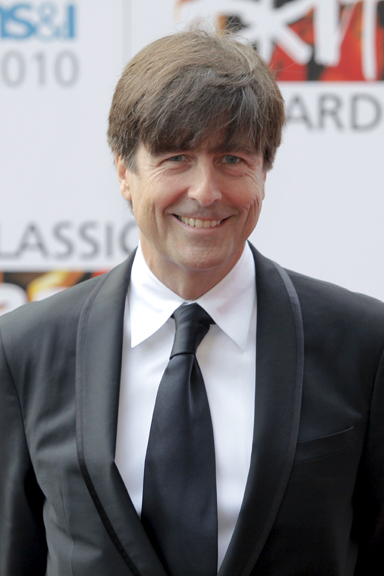
Thomas Newman composed the film's score.

Thomas Newman, who had previously worked with Mendes as composer for American Beauty, Road to Perdition, Jarhead and Revolutionary Road, replaced David Arnold as composer, becoming the ninth composer in the series' history. When asked about the circumstances surrounding his departure from the role, David Arnold commented that Newman had been selected by Mendes because of their work together, rather than because of Arnold's commitment to working with director Danny Boyle as composer for the Opening Ceremony of the 2012 Summer Olympics. The soundtrack album was released on 29 October 2012 in the United Kingdom and on 6 November 2012 in the United States.

In October 2012, British singer-songwriter Adele confirmed that she had written and recorded the film's theme song with her regular songwriter, Paul Epworth. She later posted the cover for the "Skyfall" sheet music on Twitter, crediting the songwriting to herself and Epworth, with arrangements to both Epworth and orchestrator J. A. C. Redford. The song was released online at 0:07 am BST on 5 October 2012, a day dubbed "James Bond Day" by the producers as it marked 50 years to the day of the release of Dr. No.

The song was nominated for and won the Academy Award for Best Original Song. It was the first time a Bond song had won, and the fourth time one had been nominated. (Note: The other three were "For Your Eyes Only" (1981), "Nobody Does It Better" (1977), and "Live and Let Die" (1973).) "Skyfall" also won the Brit Award for Best British Single at the 2013 BRIT Awards.

The film also features Charles Trenet's 1938 song "Boum!" during scenes in which Silva shows Bond around his abandoned island, and The Animals' 1964 cover of John Lee Hooker's song, "Boom Boom" when Silva assaults Skyfall in the film's finale.

== Release and reception ==
The premiere of Skyfall was on 23 October 2012 at the Royal Albert Hall in London. The event was attended by Charles, Prince of Wales, and his wife Camilla, Duchess of Cornwall. Charles asked that money raised at the premiere be donated to charities that served former or serving members of the British intelligence agencies. The film was released in the UK three days later on 26 October and into US cinemas on 8 November. Skyfall was the first Bond film to be screened in IMAX venues and was released into IMAX cinemas in North America a day earlier than the conventional cinema release.

Skyfall attracted some criticism from the US Sexual Violence Resource Center which, without having screened the film, expressed concern that Bond "abuses his power and authority" in a scene that suggests Bond initiates sexual intercourse with Sévérine, a former victim of sex trafficking.

=== Box office ===
Skyfall earned $1.109 billion worldwide, and at the time of its release was the highest-grossing film worldwide for Sony Pictures and the second-highest-grossing film of 2012. On its opening weekend, it earned $80.6 million from 25 markets. In the UK the film grossed £20.1 million on its opening weekend, making it the second-highest Friday-to-Sunday debut ever behind Harry Potter and the Deathly Hallows – Part 2. It also achieved the second-highest IMAX debut ever behind The Dark Knight Rises. The film set a record for the highest seven-day gross with £37.2 million, surpassing previous record holder Deathly Hallows – Part 2 (£35.7 million). By 9 November 2012 the film had earned over £57 million to surpass The Dark Knight Rises as the highest-grossing film of 2012, and the highest-grossing James Bond film of all time in the UK.

After 40 days of release the total UK gross stood at £94.28 million, making Skyfall the highest-grossing film in the UK, surpassing the £94.03 million of Avatar. By 30 December 2012, it had become the first film to gross more than £100 million ($161.6 million) in the UK. That same day, the film also crossed the $1 billion milestone worldwide, making it only the fourteenth film and first Bond film to do so. It was also the seventh-highest-grossing film ever made at the time, pushing it past the inflation-adjusted amount of $1.047 billion earned by Thunderball.

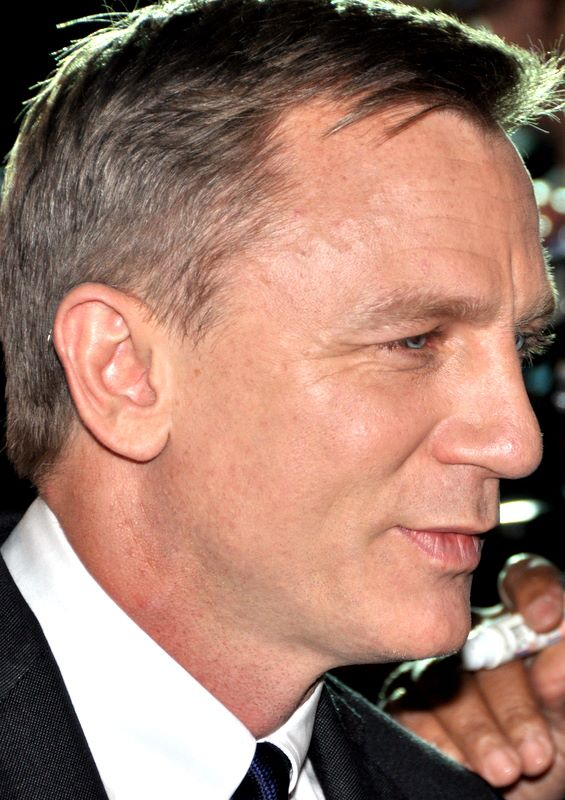
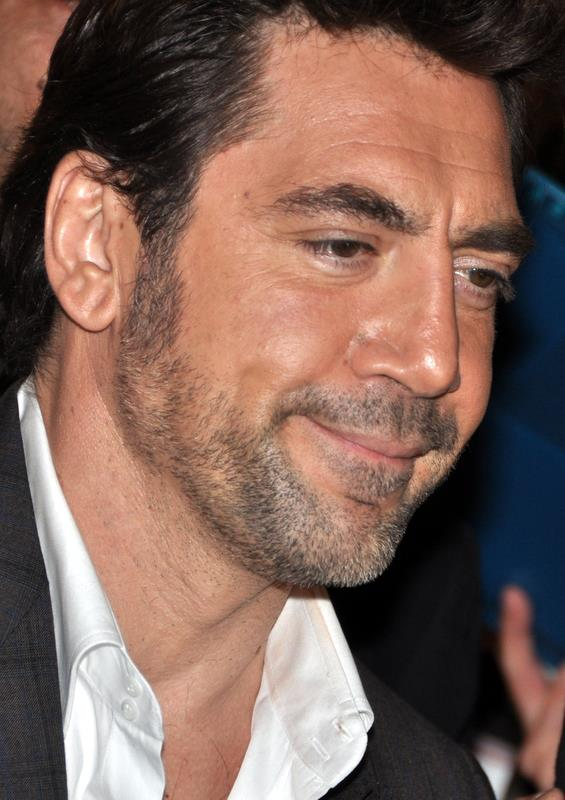
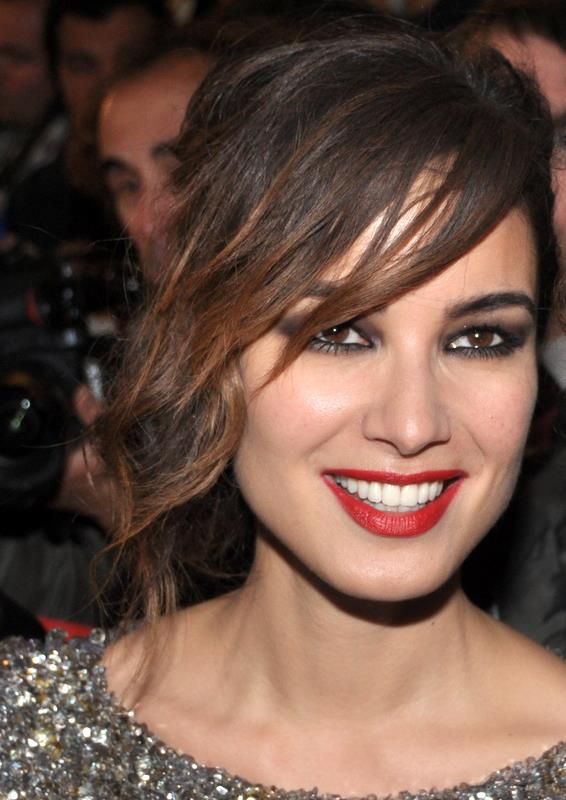
Daniel Craig, Javier Bardem and Bérénice Marlohe in Paris at the film's French premiere, October 2012

Skyfall set an opening weekend record in Switzerland ($5.3 million) and recorded the second-largest opening weekend of the year for a Hollywood film in India ($5.1 million), as well as grossing $14.3 million on its opening weekend in France. In Austria, it achieved the second-highest opening weekend ever ($3.4 million) behind The Lord of the Rings: The Return of the King, while in Finland, it scored the largest opening weekend when excluding previews ($1.47 million).

In North America, the film opened in 3,505 cinemas, the widest opening for a Bond film. The film earned $2.4 million from midnight showings on its opening day and a further $2.2 million from IMAX and large-format cinemas. Skyfall went on to gross $30.8 million on its opening day in the US and Canada, and $88.4 million in its opening weekend, the biggest debut yet for a Bond film. By the end of its theatrical run, the film earned $304.4 million in the United States and Canada, making it the fourth-highest-grossing film of 2012 in these regions.

=== Critical response ===
On review aggregator website Rotten Tomatoes, the film received an approval rating of 92% based on 390 reviews, with an average rating of 8.20/10. The site's critical consensus reads, "Sam Mendes brings Bond surging back with a smart, sexy, riveting action thriller that qualifies as one of the best 007 films to date." On Metacritic, the film has a weighted average score of 81 out of 100 based on 49 critics. CinemaScore polls reported that the average grade filmgoers gave the film was an "A" on an A+ to F scale.

A number of critics, including Kate Muir, reviewing for The Times, Philip French, writing in The Observer, IGN's Daniel Krupa and the reviewers for the Irish Independent and the Daily Record, all asked whether Skyfall was the best Bond film. The Daily Telegraph's film reviewer, Robbie Collin, considered Skyfall to be "often dazzling, always audacious", with excellent action sequences in a film that contained humour and emotion. Todd McCarthy of The Hollywood Reporter thought that Skyfall was "dramatically gripping while still brandishing a droll undercurrent of humor", going on to say that it was a film that had "some weight and complexity to it". Variety's Peter DeBruge suggested that the film's greatest strength lay in its willingness to put as much focus on characterisation as it did action set-pieces, allowing the two to co-exist rather than compete for the audience's attention, while Manohla Dargis, reviewing for The New York Times, considered Skyfall to be "a superior follow-up to Casino Royale" which is "opulent rather than outlandish and insistently, progressively low-key".

Kim Newman, reviewing the film for Empire, concluded, "Skyfall is pretty much all you could want from a 21st Century Bond: cool but not camp, respectful of tradition but up to the moment, serious in its thrills and relatively complex in its characters but with the sense of fun that hasn't always been evident lately". Roger Ebert of the Chicago Sun-Times gave the film 4 out of 4 stars, describing it as "a full-blooded, joyous, intelligent celebration of a beloved cultural icon". Reviewing for the New Statesman, Ryan Gilbey saw that "nostalgia permeates the movie", going on to say that "sometimes the old ways are the best".

A number of reviewers praised Daniel Craig's lead performance. Roger Ebert believed that in Skyfall, "Daniel Craig [takes] full possession of a role he earlier played well in 'Casino Royale,' not so well in 'Quantum'"; Philip French commented that "Craig manages to get out of the shadow of [Sean] Connery"; while Daniel Krupa thought Craig's Bond was a "defining performance" for "a great actor". Edward Porter, writing in The Sunday Times, considered that "Craig has developed an authoritative Bond persona, dry and intelligent". Ryan Gilbey thought Craig had "relaxed into Bond without losing any steeliness".

The supporting cast also received praise. Roger Ebert reflected that Skyfall "at last provides a role worthy of Judi Dench, one of the best actors of her generation. She is all but the co-star of the film, with a lot of screen time, poignant dialogue, and a character who is far more complex and sympathetic than we expect in this series". Jenny McCartney, writing in The Sunday Telegraph, agreed, describing Dench as "compellingly luminous" in the film, and the one that "the camera caresses most meaningfully and often". McCartney thought Javier Bardem played Silva "with worrisome élan", while Henry K Miller considered his character "the most authentically Bondian Bond villain in decades". A number of critics noted the strength of the supporting cast; Kim Newman found the "warmth and gravitas" of Finney's performance noteworthy, while other reviewers, including Edward Porter, Daniel Krupa and The Playlist's Oliver Lyttelton, singled out Ralph Fiennes as Mallory and Ben Whishaw as Q.

Ann Hornaday, writing for The Washington Post, thought Sam Mendes had reinvigorated the series, with Skyfall being "sleek, crisp, classy ... exhibiting just the right proportion of respect for legacy and embrace of novelty". Henry K. Miller of Sight & Sound agreed, and praised Mendes, who he thought was worthy of directing more Bond films. Kim Newman also praised Mendes's direction of the action sequences. The work of cinematographer Roger Deakins also received praise: Newman commented that he "delivers the most impressive visuals this series has had since the 1960s", and Miller described the film as "dazzlingly photographed".

The film did not escape criticism, with reviews pointing to its two and a half-hour running time, and the final third of the film being "protracted", and not matching the first two thirds in its momentum as the underlying flaws in the film. Xan Brooks of The Guardian, in an otherwise positive review, criticised the "touchy-feely indulgence" of "the bold decision to open Bond up – to probe at the character's back-story and raise a toast to his relationship with M". Daniel Krupa also singled out Naomie Harris as "awkward" and having "virtually non-existent chemistry" with Craig. Similarly Philip French in The Observer tempered his praise for the film by highlighting "some lazy repetition" and argued, "the badinage is often perfunctory and Bond is as usual captured too easily and too easily escapes". Edward Porter, writing in The Sunday Times, considered that while aspects of the film were "achieved with wit and panache", he found that the climax to the film was slightly disappointing, although the "weaknesses in the final stages are not serious, however, and the film's brief epilogue is wonderful".

In 2025, The Hollywood Reporter listed Skyfall as having the best stunts of 2012.

=== Home media ===
The UK DVD release of Skyfall was advertised by a train covered in 007 vinyls.

Skyfall was released on DVD, Blu-ray and digital HD in the US and Canada on 12 February 2013, and in the UK on 18 February 2013 by 20th Century Fox Home Entertainment and MGM Home Entertainment. It was later released on Ultra HD Blu-ray on 22 October 2019 along with the other three Daniel Craig Bond movies in a box set, and individually on 25 February 2020.

=== Accolades ===
At the 85th Academy Awards, Skyfall received nominations for Best Cinematography, Best Original Score, and Best Sound Mixing; and won Best Original Song (the first Bond theme to be so honoured) and Best Sound Editing. The film's other nominations include eight British Academy Film Awards (winning two), seven Critics' Choice Movie Awards (winning three), and a Golden Globe Award (which it won).

== See also ==
- List of films featuring home invasions
- Outline of James Bond

== Bibliography ==
- Field, Matthew; Chowdhury, Ajay (2015). Some Kind of Hero: The Remarkable Story of the James Bond Films. The History Press. ISBN 978-0-7509-6421-0. OCLC 930556527.
- Kirsch, Konrad (2024). From ›Doodlebug‹ to ›Oppenheimer‹. An Analysis of Christopher Nolan's Film Work with a Digression on James Bond's Fall in ›Skyfall‹. Stuttgart / London: Edition Axel Menges. ISBN 978-3-86905-037-9.
