= Bérénice Marlohe =

French actress (born 1979)

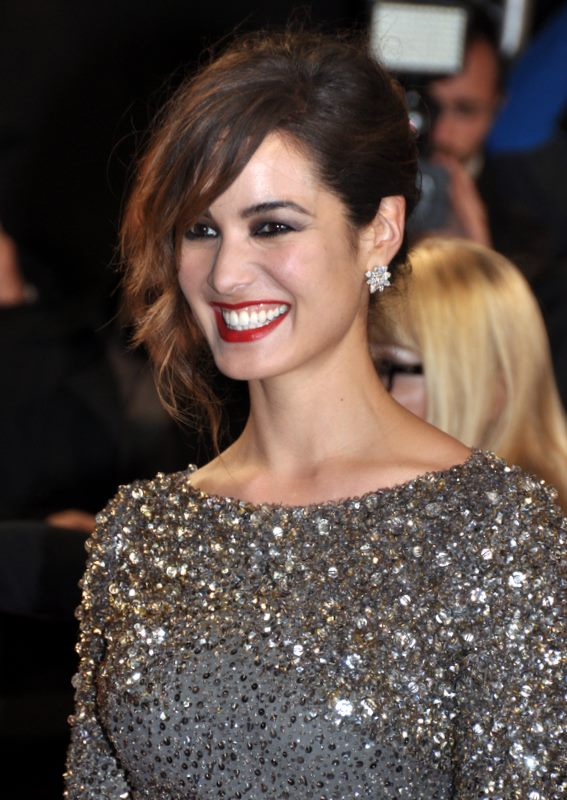
- Bérénice Marlohe at the French premiere of Skyfall
- Born: Bérénice Lim Marlohe; 19 May 1979 (age 47); Paris, France
- Occupations: Actress; model
- Years active: 2007–present
- Known for: Skyfall (2012)

Bérénice Lim Marlohe (French pronunciation: [beʁenis maʁlo]; born 19 May 1979) is a French actress. She is principally known for playing anti-heroine Bond girl Sévérine in the twenty-third James Bond film Skyfall (2012). She also had recurring roles in the American miniseries The Spoils Before Dying in 2015 and in the French medical drama Équipe médicale d'urgence (Emergency Medical Team) in 2010. She is also a brand ambassador for Omega Watches.

== Early life ==
Marlohe was born in Paris. Her father is a doctor of Cambodian and Chinese descent, and her mother, a teacher, is French. Lim is her paternal grandmother's surname. She originally held aspirations of becoming a pianist, as well as an artist, studying at the French arts school Conservatoire de Paris for ten years.

== Career ==
Marlohe first appeared in 2007 in a French short film titled La discordance before appearing in French TV series such as Pas de secrets entre nous (2008), Femmes de loi (2008), R.I.S, police scientifique (2009), and Père et maire (2009). She appeared twice in the French crime series R.I.S, police scientifique, once in 2009 and once in 2012. In 2012 she played the date of Laurent, played by Maurice Barthélemy, in Happiness Never Comes Alone.

She is best known for her role as Bond girl Sévérine in 2012's twenty-third James Bond film Skyfall. A strong believer in fate, she stated that she dreamt of acting alongside Javier Bardem six months before her Bond audition and It was not until the second audition for Skyfall that she learned Bardem might also be cast. She starred in the 2015 film 5 to 7 and appeared in the 2017 film Song to Song alongside Ryan Gosling, Natalie Portman, and Rooney Mara.

== Filmography ==
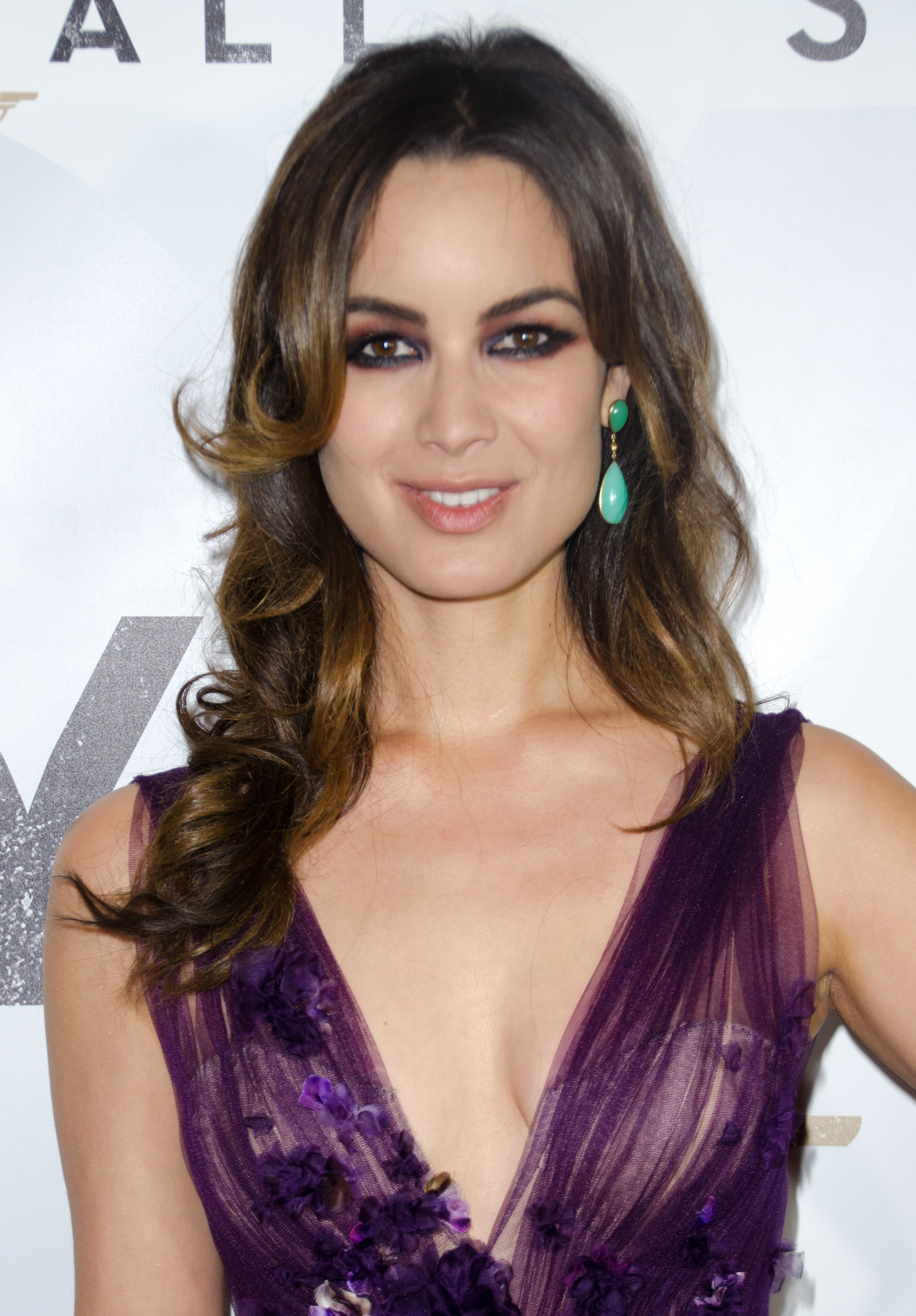
Marlohe at the Australian premiere of Skyfall, November 2012.

=== Film ===
| Year | Original title | English title | Role | Director |
|---|---|---|---|---|
| 2007 | La Discordance (short film) | | The young lady | Patrick Hernandez |
| 2011 | L'art de séduire | | The young sports | Guy Mazarguil |
| 2012 | Un bonheur n'arrive jamais seul | Happiness Never Comes Alone | Laurent's date | James Huth |
| 2012 | Skyfall | | Sévérine | Sam Mendes |
| 2015 | 5 to 7 | | Arielle Pierpont | Victor Levin |
| 2017 | Song to Song | | Zoey | Terrence Malick |
| 2017 | Revolt | | Nadia | Joe Miale |
| 2017 | Kill Switch | | Abby | Tim Smit |
| 2019 | Valley of the Gods | | Karen Kitson | Lech Majewski |

=== Television ===
| Year | Title | Role | Country / Type |
|---|---|---|---|
| 2008 | Pas de secrets entre nous | Ingrid | France – TV series |
| 2008 | Femmes de loi (Episode: "Passager clandestin") | Barmaid | France – TV series |
| 2008 | Section de recherches (Episode: "Une femme comme les autres") | Isabelle Marnay | France – TV series |
| 2009 | R.I.S, police scientifique (Episode: "Mise à l'épreuve – 2ème partie") | Eglantine du Meunier | France – TV series |
| 2009 | Le temps est à l'orage | Alicia | France – TV film |
| 2009 | Père et maire (Episode: "La reconquête") | Caroline Pylet | France – TV series |
| 2010 | Le pigeon | Host Golf | France – TV film |
| 2010 | Équipe médicale d'urgence (Episode: "2, 3, 7, 9") | Alexia | France – TV series |
| 2012 | R.I.S, police scientifique (Episode: "Diamant bleu") | Jewelry Woman | France – TV series |
| 2015 | The Spoils Before Dying (6 episodes) | Beatrice | United States – TV miniseries |
| 2017 | Twin Peaks (Episode: "Part 12") | French Woman | United States – TV series |
