= Crack-Up =

Crack-Up can refer to:

- The Crack-Up, a 1945 collection of essays by F. Scott Fitzgerald
- Crack-Up (1936 film), an American movie
- Crack-Up (1946 film), an American movie
- Crack-Up (album), 2017 album by Fleet Foxes

== See also ==
- Laughter
