= Cracking =

Cracking may refer to:

- Cracking, the formation of a fracture or partial fracture in a solid material studied as fracture mechanics
  - Performing a sternotomy
- Fluid catalytic cracking, a catalytic process widely used in oil refineries for cracking large hydrocarbon molecules into smaller molecules
- Cracking (chemistry), the decomposition of complex organic molecules into smaller ones
- Cracking joints, the practice of manipulating one's bone joints to make a sharp sound
- Cracking codes, see cryptanalysis
- Whip cracking
- Safe cracking
- Crackin', band featuring Lester Abrams
- Packing and cracking, a method of creating voting districts to give a political party an advantage

In computing:

- Another name for security hacking; the practice of defeating computer security.
- Password cracking, the process of discovering the plaintext of an encrypted computer password.
- Software cracking, the defeating of software copy protection.

== See also ==
- Crack (disambiguation)
- Cracker (disambiguation)
- Cracklings (solid material remaining after rendering fat)
- Cracker (pejorative)
- Crac
