= Laurie Craker =

English footballer and manager (1953–2020)

Personal information
- Full name: Laurence David Craker
- Date of birth: 1 March 1953
- Place of birth: Aylesbury, England
- Date of death: 16 May 2020 (aged 67)
- Height: 5 ft 9 in (1.75 m)
- Position: Midfielder

Youth career
- –1971: Chelsea

Senior career*
Years	Team	Apps	(Gls)
1971–1972	Jewish Guild		
1972–1977	Watford	66	(4)
197?	→ Dartford (loan)		
1977–1981	Hayes		
- Staines Town
- Chesham United
- Maidenhead United
- Northwood
- Chalfont St Peter
Total		66	(4)

Managerial career
- 1984–198?: Windsor & Eton
- 1986–1987: Chalfont St Peter
- 1996–1997: Walton & Hersham
- 1999: Chesham United
- 2000–2001: Flackwell Heath
- 2004–200?: Flackwell Heath
- * Club domestic league appearances and goals

Laurence David Craker (1 March 1953 – 16 May 2020) was an English footballer and manager who played as a midfielder. As a player, Craker played in the Third Division and the Fourth Division with Watford.

== Early life ==
Craker was born in Aylesbury in Buckinghamshire.

== Playing career ==
As a player, Craker started his career at Chelsea, but did not make an appearance for the club and left to join Jewish Guild in 1971, where he played for nine months. He returned to England, joining Watford in 1972. Craker went on to make 66 league appearances for Watford, scoring 4, between 1972 and 1977 in the Third Division and the Fourth Division. He suffered multiple injuries while at Watford, including a broken leg. Towards the end of his spell at Watford, Craker had a three-month loan spell at Dartford.

After leaving Watford, Craker joined Hayes in August 1977, where he made 184 appearances, scoring 8, before being released by the club in August 1981. Following his release by Hayes, Craker played for Staines Town and Chesham United, before playing as captain of Maidenhead United in the 1983–84 season. He later played for Northwood and Chalfont St Peter.

== Managerial career ==
Craker's first managerial role came when he was offered the manager role at Windsor & Eton in 1984, before later managing Chalfont St Peter across the 1986–87 season. In 1990, he was appointed as assistant manager at Marlow with Dave Russell, and helped guide Marlow to the FA Cup third round in the 1992–93 season, before Craker and Russell moved on to Slough Town. Craker was manager of Walton & Hersham across the 1996–97 season.

In January 1999, Craker became the assistant manager of Chesham United, before becoming their manager in April 1999 following the departure of Alan Cork. He later became the manager of Flackwell Heath in 2000 before resigning in August of the following year. Craker was appointed as a coach at Kingstonian in 2003, before returning to Flackwell Heath as manager in 2004. Craker became assistant manager at Burnham before resigning in 2014.

== Personal life ==
Craker also worked as a thatcher alongside his father.

His son Lewis was also a footballer and played for multiple clubs, including Maidenhead United, and is now manager of Thame Rangers.

Craker died of cancer on 16 May 2020, aged 67.
