= CRAC =

CRAC might refer to:

- The CRAC-II "Calculation of Reactor Accident Consequences" study
- A castle, as in Krak des Chevaliers
- A Computer Room Air Conditioner
- Clube Recreativo e Atlético Catalano, a Brazilian football (soccer) club commonly known as CRAC
- Clube Recreativo Atlético Campoverdense, a Brazilian football (soccer) club commonly known as CRAC
- Crac, a 1981 Oscar-winning animated short film
- Calcium Release Activated Channels, ion channels in cell membrane
- Closed Reduction And Cast, an orthopaedic surgical procedure
