= Lyle Craker =

Lyle E. Craker was a Professor in the Department of Plant, Soil and Insect Sciences at the University of Massachusetts Amherst. Since 2001, Craker has been trying to obtain a permit from the United States Drug Enforcement Administration (DEA) to grow marijuana for research purposes. He died in May 2022.

== Education ==
In 1963, Craker received a B.S. degree in agronomy from the University of Wisconsin, Madison. In 1967 he received a Ph.D. in agronomy and plant genetics with a specialty in plant physiology from the University of Minnesota. In 1976 he received an associate degree in business administration from Massachusetts Bay Community College.

== Marijuana studies ==
Craker is known for proposing that medical grade marijuana be available for scientific studies into its possible health benefits. Since the marijuana available for studies is too weak for any kind of medical study, he proposed that medical grade marijuana be made available for research purposes. He has been named in many newspapers on this subject. The federal government refuses to give him a license to grow medical grade marijuana. On April 29, 2009, Senators Edward M. Kennedy and John F. Kerry wrote a letter to the Honorable David W. Ogden urging the Deputy Attorney General to delay a final decision on the application by Lyle E. Craker of the University of Massachusetts Amherst to produce research-grade marijuana for use in federally approved clinical trials
