= Krak =

Krak may refer to:

- another name for Krakus, a legendary Polish prince
- Krak Glacier, King George Island, off the coast of Antarctica, named after the former
- Thorvald Krak (1830-1908), Danish city official and founder of Kraks Forlag
- KNCI, a radio station in Sacramento, California, whose call sign was KRAK-FM from 1985 to 1994
- KMPS (AM), a radio station licensed to serve Hesperia, California, whose call sign was KRAK from 2001 to 2017
- a term from Medieval Arabic karak meaning 'fortress' (Old French: crac):
  - Krak des Chevaliers, a Crusader castle in present-day Syria
  - Kerak Castle, originally known in Old French as Crac des Moabites
  - Montreal (Crusader castle), originally known in Old French as Crac de Mont Real
