= Kane Gamble =

British hacker (born 1999)

- Born: October 1999 (age 27); Leicester, England, U.K.
- Other name: Cracka
- Occupation: Cybersecurity

Kane Gamble or known online as Cracka (born October 2, 1999) is a British hacker from Leicester, who lead a hacktivist group called Crackas With Attitude (CWA) in 2015, responsible for hacking US government networks, emails and phone accounts of several US government officials (including the US Department of Justice network, the FBI's Law Enforcement Enterprise Portal, former CIA chief John Brennan, the former director of national intelligence James Clapper, the former deputy director of the FBI Mark Giuliano and Obama's deputy national security adviser Avril Haines).

Gamble was just 15 years old at the time of the offences. The court described he accessed “extremely sensitive” documents referring to operations (military and intelligence) in Iraq and Afghanistan. Some of the information obtained was posted on Wikileaks and others websites. Gamble committed the offences to "raise awareness for the situation in Palestine and the war in Iraq"

Gamble pleaded guilty to 10 charges and was sentenced to two years in a youth detention centre. He served his sentence at HMP Belmarsh, a category A notorious maximum security prison in South East London.

== Rehabiliation ==
Kane Gamble was released from imprisonment in 2019. Since his release, Gamble has taken part in Bug Bounty programs to help companies secure their websites such as T-Mobile (where he was paid the maximum bounty of $5,000), Ministry of Defence, AT&T and more. Gamble also has several CVE's assigned to his name, including vulnerabilities identified in the encrypted messaging app Wire and Sitecore.

Gamble currently works in the information security sector, specifically as a Senior Security Consultant helping businesses identify vulnerabilities in their systems.
