= From Russia with Love (video game) =

2005 video game

- Developer: EA Redwood Shores (Note: PlayStation Portable version developed by Rebellion Developments)
- Publisher: Electronic Arts (Note: Co-published by MGM Interactive)
- Directors: Stephen Barry; Michael Condrey
- Producers: Cate Latchford; Sam Player
- Designer: Bret Robbins
- Programmers: Russell Brown; Louis Gascoigne
- Artist: Dave Carson
- Writer: Bruce Feirstein
- Composer: Christopher Lennertz
- Series: James Bond video games
- Platforms: GameCube, PlayStation 2, Xbox, PlayStation Portable
- Release: GameCube, PlayStation 2, Xbox: NA: 1 November 2005; NA: 15 November 2005 (GC); EU: 18 November 2005; AU: 21 November 2005; PlayStation Portable: NA: 4 April 2006; UK: 14 April 2006
- Genre: Third-person shooter
- Modes: Single-player, multiplayer

From Russia with Love is a 2005 third-person shooter game developed by EA Redwood Shores and published by Electronic Arts (EA). It is based on the 1963 James Bond film of the same name but with several changes, including additional characters, locations, and a different villainous organisation. Additionally, it features elements of later Bond films such as the Aston Martin DB5 that debuted in Goldfinger (1964) and the jet pack from Thunderball (1965).

From Russia with Love is the only video game to use Sean Connery's younger likeness as James Bond and the first to include all new voice work by Connery after twenty-two years away from the role, marking his eighth and final performance as Bond across any medium before his death in 2020. From Russia with Love is also the last James Bond video game developed or published by Electronic Arts before they lost the rights to Activision in 2006.

From Russia with Love was released for GameCube, PlayStation 2, and Xbox in November 2005. A PlayStation Portable (PSP) version was released in April 2006. The game received mixed reviews.

== Gameplay ==
Third-person view of Bond

From Russia with Love is primarily a third-person shooter, with the player taking on the role of James Bond. The game is played across 14 main levels but includes four bonus levels which can be unlocked throughout. The player has mission objectives that must be carried out before proceeding to the next level.

The game includes several driving levels, in which the player takes control of various armed vehicles and must evade enemies, using weapons such as a machine gun and rockets. Speedboats and Bond's Aston Martin DB5 are among the armed vehicles used by the player. Jet packs, equipped with machine guns and rockets, are also used throughout the game.

Bond using the jet pack

On foot, Bond can jump across certain designated ledges. He can use his usual Walther PPK, in addition to other weapons such as shotguns, assault rifles, sniper rifles, bazookas, and grenades. He can also engage in hand-to-hand combat with enemies. Points can be collected throughout the game, by killing enemies in specific ways, or by collecting schematics hidden in each level. Such points can be used to upgrade weapons, or unlock bonus content such as concept art and behind-the-scene movies.

A variety of Q gadgets are used throughout the game, including a rappelling gun that is used to climb and descend to new areas. A laser wristwatch is used to penetrate bulletproof glass and destroy control panels, thereby unlocking security doors that block the player's path. Mini helicopters are used to access remote areas and can be detonated, also to destroy certain control panels. Sonic cufflinks can be used to emit a high-frequency that temporarily incapacitates enemies. A serum gun can be used to inject enemies from afar, confusing them into turning against their own. In addition, there are instances where the player must equip a gas mask to proceed through rooms that become filled with toxins.

The game includes an offline multiplayer option, with various gameplay modes, characters, and locations. It supports up to four players.

The PlayStation Portable (PSP) version plays largely the same as the home-console versions, although it includes minigames and new multiplayer levels and characters, but removes the driving missions.

== Plot ==
One of the changes to the plot of the video game is the absence of the villainous organisation SPECTRE, who are never mentioned in the novel but played a vital role in the film. Due to legal issues that had plagued the James Bond film series since 1963, the organization was renamed "OCTOPUS" and appears to lack a central leader in the same vein as Ernst Stavro Blofeld. The SPECTRE name was tied up in a long-running dispute over the film rights to Thunderball (1965), between United Artists/MGM and the screenwriter Kevin McClory.

The game begins with a pre-title sequence in which Elizabeth Stark, the Prime Minister of the United Kingdom's daughter, is kidnapped by OCTOPUS while attending a party. Bond was assigned to attend the party for just such an event, and he defeats OCTOPUS and rescues Miss Stark.

Similar to the film, OCTOPUS has conceived a plan to embarrass British Secret Service agent 007 for the death of Dr. Julius No from the film Dr. No (1962), in which No was an agent of SPECTRE. The plan involves the theft of a Soviet encoding machine known as the Lektor with the help of a defecting Soviet agent, Tatiana Romanova. However, Romanova is being used by OCTOPUS to lure James Bond into a trap; their ultimate goal is to let him obtain the Lektor and then ambush him for it, killing him in a humiliating fashion as well. Romanova is sent by Rosa Klebb, an agent of the KGB (in both the novel and film, an agent of SMERSH) who has secretly defected to OCTOPUS. Her immediate subordinate, Donald "Red" Grant, protects Bond through the first half of the game and attacks him in the second. The game ends with a final assault on OCTOPUS headquarters, during which Grant is fatally shot by Bond.

== Development and release ==
From Russia with Love is based on the 1963 film of the same name. The game adaptation was written by Bruce Feirstein, who previously worked on the scripts for the Bond films GoldenEye (1995), Tomorrow Never Dies (1997) and The World Is Not Enough (1999), in addition to the video game James Bond 007: Everything or Nothing (2004). Electronic Arts (EA) announced the game in January 2005. EA had spent more than two years developing an engine for the game, and nearly a year was spent on pre-production. The development team included members who had previously worked on Everything or Nothing, also a third-person game. The gameplay in From Russia with Love is similar to the earlier game.

The game's executive producer, Glen Schofield, considered 1963's From Russia with Love to be among the most popular Bond films. EA described the game as a director's cut, as it offers additional story elements, locations, and gadgets compared to the film. Some concepts from later Bond films were incorporated into the game, including Bond's Aston Martin DB5, which debuted in Goldfinger (1964); and the jet pack, which was introduced in Thunderball (1965). Everything or Nothing had featured a mechanical spider gadget known as the Q Spider, although the development team considered it too modern for From Russia with Love, opting instead for the Q Copter.

Sean Connery reprised his role from the film as James Bond, lending his voice to the game. His likeness, from 1963, was also implemented. The game marked Connery's first appearance as Bond since the film Never Say Never Again (1983), and it also served as his video game debut. Connery said, "As an artist, I see this as another way to explore the creative process. Video games are an extremely popular form of entertainment today, and I am looking forward to seeing how it all fits together". Two factors led to his participation in the project: From Russia with Love was his favorite Bond film, and his grandchildren were avid video game players. Connery recorded his lines from his home in the Bahamas. His character model was based primarily on frames from the film. The game's use of physical combat was inspired by Connery's portrayal of Bond in the films, with Schofield describing him as "more of a brawler" compared to later actors who played the character.

The likenesses of several deceased actors from the film were used as well, including Desmond Llewelyn as Q, Robert Shaw as Red Grant, and Lotte Lenya as Rosa Klebb. The game also introduces two new characters: Natasha Bedingfield as Elizabeth Stark, and Maria Menounos as Eva. Bedingfield had previously performed a song for the Bond spin-off game GoldenEye: Rogue Agent (2004).

The development team had full access to MGM's collection of reference material for the film, which helped to recapture its 1960s setting. The game uses washed-out sepia tones to match the look of the film, and level designs were based on Bond film sets created by production designer Ken Adam. The game's art director, Dave Carson, said it was challenging to match the film's time period: "The movie takes place primarily in Istanbul, which offers few '60s-specific images. We used '60s clothing and hairstyles wherever possible". The team visited the game's real-life locations, such as Big Ben, to take reference photos. The game's soundtrack was composed by Christopher Lennertz and recorded at Abbey Road Studios in London.

The game was completed on 20 October 2005. In North America, it was released for the PlayStation 2 and Xbox on 1 November 2005, followed by a GameCube release two weeks later. The game was released in Europe on 18 November. It would later be released in Australia on 21 November. The PlayStation Portable (PSP) version was announced that month, and was released in North America and the United Kingdom in 2006 on 4 April and 14 April, respectively. From Russia with Love was the final Bond game by EA, which lost the rights to Activision in 2006. It would also mark Connery's final appearance as Bond before his death in 2020.

== Reception ==
Reception

Aggregate score
Aggregator	Score
Metacritic	(Xbox) 71/100 (GC) 70/100 (PS2) 69/100 (PSP) 61/100

Review scores
Publication	Score
Electronic Gaming Monthly	6.17/10
Eurogamer	6/10
GamePro	4/5 (PSP) 3/5
GameSpot	7/10 (PSP) 6.3/10
GameSpy	(Xbox) 4/5 (PS2) 3.5/5 (PSP) 3/5
GameZone	6.9/10
IGN	7.9/10 (PSP) 7.1/10
Official U.S. PlayStation Magazine	(PS2) 3/5 (PSP) 2.5/5
PALGN	5/10
TeamXbox	7.3/10
X-Play	3/5
Maxim	6/10
The Times	4/5

From Russia with Love received "mixed or average" reviews from critics, according to review aggregator website Metacritic. Many points were given to the enhanced graphics and play difficulty. The Times gave it a score of four stars out of five and stated that "It's enough to make you toss your trilby on to a hat-rack in delight." However, Maxim gave it a score of six out of ten and stated that though the game was challenging, "it's also sometimes pedestrian, with a host of uninspired levels and dim bad guys ruining what could have been the triumphant return of 007." Within three months of its release, it had sold approximately 277,000 copies.

In 2014, Schofield expressed disappointment that the game was not rated higher. Director Michael Condrey said, "It was a good game, but we didn't have enough time or resources to really deliver on the vision we wanted for it". In 2015, Graeme Virtue of Eurogamer called the game a "respectful tribute to the formative years of the character", concluding, "It might have ended up a rather haphazard game – with an utterly superfluous Natasha Bedingfield cameo – but From Russia with Love remains a fitting cultural artefact to commemorate what will presumably be both EA and Connery's final Bond swan song".
