= SPECTRE =

Fictional organisation in the James Bond franchise

- James Bond series organization
- SPECTRE's logo as featured on its members' rings in Thunderball and You Only Live Twice. Different rings are featured in From Russia with Love and SPECTRE.

In-universe information
- Type: Evil corporation; Organised crime syndicate; Terrorist organisation; Private intelligence agency
- Location: Paris, 136 Boulevard Haussmann; SPECTRE island; SPECTRE yacht; SPECTRE Bird One launch base; Tangier; Numerous
- Key people: Ernst Stavro Blofeld (#1/director); Emilio Largo (#2); Rosa Klebb (#3); Tov Kronsteen (#5); Helga Brandt (#11); Irma Bunt; Dr. Julius No; Tamil Rahani; Jay Autem Holy; Nena Bisquamer (née Blofeld); Mr. White; Le Chiffre; Dominic Greene; Raoul Silva; Mr. Hinx
- Purpose: Counterintelligence, terrorism, revenge, extortion, world domination
- Subsidiaries: Quantum

SPECTRE ("Special Executive for Counter-intelligence, Terrorism, Revenge and Extortion") is a fictional organisation featured in the James Bond novels by Ian Fleming, as well as films and video games based in the same universe. Led by criminal mastermind Ernst Stavro Blofeld, SPECTRE first formally appeared in the novel Thunderball (1961) and in the film Dr. No (1962). The international organisation is not aligned with any nation or political ideology, enabling the later Bond books and Bond films to be regarded as somewhat apolitical. The presence of former Gestapo members in the organization can be considered as a sign of Fleming's warnings about Nazi fugitives after the Second World War, as first detailed in the novel Moonraker (1955). In the novels, SPECTRE begins as a small group of criminals, but in the films it is depicted as a vast international organisation with its own SPECTRE Island training base capable of replacing the Soviet SMERSH.

== Philosophy and goals ==
Blofeld's SPECTRE volcano base complete with spacecraft-swallowing Bird One spacecraft, helipad and attack helicopter, and command centre in the 1967 film You Only Live Twice. The world map in the background is common to emphasise the aim of world domination.

In the James Bond novels, SPECTRE is an organised crime enterprise led by Ernst Stavro Blofeld. The organisation's executive consists of 21 individuals, 18 of whom handle day-to-day affairs. Members are drawn in groups of three from six of the world's most notorious organisations — the Nazi German Gestapo, the Soviet SMERSH, Yugoslav Marshal Josip Broz Tito's OZNA, the Italian Mafia, the French-Corsican Unione Corse, and KRYSTAL, a massive Turkish heroin-smuggling operation. Coincidentally, the three from KRYSTAL are all former members of RAHIR, an intelligence agency previously run by Blofeld. The remaining three members are Blofeld himself and two scientific/technical experts who make their debut in the ninth Bond novel, Thunderball (1961). When Ian Fleming was writing the novel in 1959, he believed that the Cold War might end during the two years it would take to produce the film, and he came to the conclusion that the inclusion of a contemporary political villain would leave the film looking dated. Therefore, he thought it better to create a politically neutral enemy for Bond. Fleming's SPECTRE has elements inspired by mafia syndicates and organised crime rings that were actively hunted by law enforcement in the 1950s. The strict codes of loyalty and silence, and the hard retributions that followed violations, were hallmarks of American gangster rings, the Italian Mafia, the Russian mafia, the Unione Corse, the Chinese Tongs and Triads, and the Japanese Yakuza and Black Dragon Society. During the events of Thunderball, SPECTRE successfully hijacked two nuclear warheads for ransom.

The organisation is next mentioned in the tenth novel, The Spy Who Loved Me (1962), when James Bond describes investigating their activities in Toronto before the story begins, though they play no part in the story itself. The organisation's third appearance is in the eleventh novel, On Her Majesty's Secret Service (1963) where Blofeld, hired by an unnamed country or party—though the Soviet Union is implied—is executing a plan to ruin British agriculture with biological warfare. Blofeld, with a weakened SPECTRE, would appear for the final time in the twelfth novel, You Only Live Twice (1964). By this point, the organisation has largely been shut down, and what remains is focused on maintaining Blofeld's alias as Dr. Guntram von Shatterhand and his compound in Japan.

In the films, the organisation often acts as a third party in the ongoing Cold War. Their objectives have ranged from supporting Dr. Julius No (Joseph Wiseman) in sabotaging American rocket launches, holding the world to ransom, and demanding clemency from governments for their previous crimes. The goal of world domination was only ever stated in the film version of You Only Live Twice (1967) when SPECTRE was working on behalf of an unnamed Asian government. This is strongly implied to be Red China, who earlier backed Auric Goldfinger (Gert Fröbe) in the 1964 film of the same name.

Its long-term strategy, however, is illustrated by the analogy of the three Siamese fighting fish Blofeld keeps in an aquarium aboard SPECTRE's yacht in the film version of From Russia with Love (1963). Blofeld notes that one fish is refraining from fighting two others until their fight is concluded. Then, that cunning fish attacks the weakened victor and kills it easily. Thus SPECTRE's main strategy is to instigate conflict between two powerful enemies, namely the superpowers, hoping that they will exhaust themselves and be vulnerable when it seizes power. SPECTRE thus works with, and against, both sides of the Cold War. For example, in the film Thunderball (1965), it simultaneously blackmails a Japanese double agent, distributes Red Chinese narcotics in the United States, kills a defector to the USSR on behalf of the French Foreign Ministry, and threatens NATO with stolen nuclear weapons, while continuing ordinary criminal operations such as advising on the British Great Train Robbery.

In both the film and the novel Thunderball, the physical headquarters of the organisation are in Paris, operating behind a front organisation aiding refugees named "Firco" (Fraternité Internationale de la Résistance Contre l'Oppression) in the novels and "International Brotherhood for the Assistance of Stateless Persons" in the films. Organisational discipline is notoriously draconian, with the penalty for disobedience or failure being death. To heighten the impact of executions, Blofeld had been known to focus attention on an innocent member, making it appear his death is imminent, only to suddenly strike down the actual target when that person is off guard.

== Leadership ==
SPECTRE is headed by the criminal mastermind Ernst Stavro Blofeld who usually appears accompanied by a Chinchilla Silver Persian cat in the films, but not in the books. In both the films and the novels, Emilio Largo (played in the film Thunderball by Adolfo Celi) is the second in command. It is stated in the novel that if something were to happen to Blofeld, Largo would assume command. Largo appears in the 1961 novel Thunderball, the 1965 film version and its 1983 remake, Never Say Never Again, where he is renamed Maximilian Largo (Klaus Maria Brandauer) and is said to be Romanian rather than Italian.

The SPECTRE cabinet had a total of twenty-one members. Blofeld was the chairman and leader because he founded the organisation and Largo was elected by the cabinet to be second in command. A physicist named Kotze (who later defected) and an electronics expert named Maslov were also included in the group for their expertise on scientific and technical matters.

Members are typically referred to by number rather than by name. In the novels, the numbers were initially assigned at random and then rotated up by two digits on a once-a-month basis to prevent detection; for example, if a SPECTRE operative is titled 'Number 1' in the present month, the security system will designate them 'Number 3' in the next month, 'Number 5' in the following month and so forth. However, in the EON films the number indicates rank within the organisation: Blofeld is always referred to as 'Number 1' and Emilio Largo, in Thunderball, is 'Number 2'. This particular example of numbering is perhaps deliberately borrowed from revolutionary organisations, where members exist in cells, and are numerically defined to prevent identification and cross-betrayal of aims. By deliberately drawing attention away from the true leader of the organisation, he is protected by masquerading as a target of lower importance, and the structure of the organisation is also obscured from intelligence services.

Members who fail missions are immediately executed, usually in gory and spectacular ways. In the novel, Blofeld electrocutes Pierre Borraud (codename Number 12) in his chair for sexually molesting a girl who had been kidnapped by the organisation; he had previously strangled a second to death with a garrote and shot a third through the heart with a compressed-air pistol. In the film, Number 9 (Clive Cazes) is electrocuted for embezzlement at the Thunderball meeting where he and Number 11 (Murray Kash) report on the proceeds from a narcotics-related operation. The merciless killing of assistant Helga Brandt (Karin Dor) in You Only Live Twice, for failing to kill James Bond (Sean Connery), similarly horrifies visiting Red Chinese agents; she is dropped into a pool of piranha, which quickly eat her alive.

Previously, in From Russia with Love, Tov Kronsteen (Vladek Sheybal) was killed with a poisoned shoe knife in front of Rosa Klebb (Lotte Lenya) to motivate Klebb to complete her mission with no further delays. Blofeld prefers to accuse another operative as a decoy, keeping his victim calm inside the trap before executing them.

== Appearances ==
=== Novels ===
In the original Bond novel series, SPECTRE's first and last appearance as a worldwide power is in the novel Thunderball. In it, SPECTRE attempts to conduct nuclear blackmail against NATO. Apparently disbanded afterwards, SPECTRE is said to be active again in the next book, The Spy Who Loved Me, although the organisation is not involved in the plot. In On Her Majesty's Secret Service, the second chapter of what is known as the "Blofeld Trilogy", Blofeld has revived SPECTRE where he attempts to carry out biological warfare against the United Kingdom. Blofeld's final appearance is in You Only Live Twice, where SPECTRE has largely disbanded.

Later, the John Gardner Bond novel, For Special Services introduces a revived SPECTRE led by Blofeld's daughter, Nena Bismaquer. Although Bond ultimately prevents SPECTRE from reforming, the organisation continues under the leadership of Tamil Rahani to play a part in Role of Honour and Nobody Lives for Ever. The next Bond novelist, Raymond Benson, reintroduces Irma Bunt, Blofeld's assistant, in his short story "Blast From the Past", which is a sequel to You Only Live Twice.

=== Films ===
Dr. No with his aquarium in the background.

In the EON Productions's James Bond series, which began in 1962 with Dr. No, SPECTRE plays a more prominent role. The organisation is mentioned as being affiliated with Dr. Julius No, although the main organisation in the movie is No's personal army. In the novel, Dr. No worked for the USSR. In the films, SPECTRE usually replaced SMERSH as the main villain, although there is a brief reference to SMERSH in the second EON Bond film, From Russia with Love (1963). The film adaptation of From Russia with Love also features the first on-screen appearance of Blofeld (portrayed by Anthony Dawson and voiced by Eric Pohlmann), although he is only identified by name in the closing credits of the film and his face is not seen at all. SPECTRE also serves as the primary antagonist of the film, orchestrating a plan to humiliate and kill James Bond as revenge for the death of Dr. No.

After being absent from the third film, Goldfinger (1964), SPECTRE returns in the fourth film, Thunderball (1965), which closely mirrors the events of the novel, and subsequently is featured in the following films. During the events of the fifth film, You Only Live Twice (1967), they attempt to incite a war between the United States and Soviet Union. In film number six, On Her Majesty's Secret Service (1969), Blofeld (Telly Savalas) develops a biological warfare program and plans to demand clemency and recognition of a claimed title of nobility. SPECTRE's final appearance is in the seventh film, Diamonds Are Forever (1971), where they attempt to forcibly disarm the Cold War powers. SPECTRE was dismantled for good after Diamonds Are Forever. Following Diamonds Are Forever, SPECTRE and Blofeld were retired from the EON Films series, except for a cameo by a character implied to be Blofeld (John Hollis) in For Your Eyes Only (1981) in which said character is killed. Partly owing to a copyright dispute between rival Bond producers Albert R. Broccoli and Kevin McClory, the character is never referred to by name and is credited as "Wheelchair Villain", though the closed captions for the film later refer to him as Blofeld.

=== Rebooted continuity ===
The organisation returns in the rebooted Daniel Craig series of Bond films, which are set in an entirely separate universe to the earlier movies. In the 2015 film Spectre, the organisation is simply referred to by that title. In the film, Judi Dench's M posthumously sends James Bond to assassinate Marco Sciarra (Alessandro Cremona), which in turn leads him on the trail of the organisation. It is revealed throughout the course of the film that SPECTRE, and in turn Ernst Stavro Blofeld (Christoph Waltz), have been the power behind the previous Craig villains; the Quantum organisation from Casino Royale (2006) and 2008's Quantum of Solace is revealed to be a subsidiary of SPECTRE, while Raoul Silva (Javier Bardem) from Skyfall (2012) is shown to be affiliated with the organisation as well. In addition to Silva, Le Chiffre (Mads Mikkelsen), Mr. White (Jesper Christensen), and Dominic Greene (Mathieu Amalric) are all revealed to have a direct connection to SPECTRE. It is also revealed that Blofeld is really Franz Oberhauser, whose father Hannes adopted Bond after the latter was orphaned at age 11, and who murdered his father and faked his own death.

Using SPECTRE, Blofeld attempts to gain control of a global surveillance program called Nine Eyes. Bond, M (Ralph Fiennes), and Q (Ben Whishaw) manage to stop them and Blofeld is captured by MI6 and sent to prison for his crimes.

This iteration of SPECTRE returns in the 2021 film No Time to Die, where they remain at large despite Blofeld's imprisonment and attempt to assassinate Bond in Matera. Five years later, the organisation kidnaps MI6 scientist Valdo Obruchev (David Dencik) and takes "Project Heracles", a DNA-targeted bioweapon.

Every high- and mid-level ranking SPECTRE member meets in Cuba, and it is revealed that Blofeld is still in control of the organisation, despite being imprisoned in Britain. Bond sneaks in to the meeting and is ordered by Blofeld to be killed by the nanobots, but Obruchev secretly had the DNA changed from Bond to every SPECTRE member and anyone related to them, killing every SPECTRE member at the meeting. The main antagonist of the film, Lyutsifer Safin (Rami Malek), seeks revenge against the organisation after Blofeld ordered Mr. White to murder his entire family. As the bioweapon kills SPECTRE members and their relatives around the world, the organisation is destroyed.

With Blofeld as the last surviving member of the organisation, Safin blackmails Madeleine Swann (Léa Seydoux) into infecting Blofeld with Heracles. Swann backs out after she unintentionally infects Bond, but the mission is a success when Bond attacks Blofeld, who is infected and dies.

The remaining survivors of SPECTRE, such as operative Primo (Dali Benssalah), defect to Safin and are killed at the ending of the film, destroying SPECTRE once and for all.

=== Non-EON film appearances ===
In 1983 Warner Bros. released Never Say Never Again starring Sean Connery, based on the same original source material as Thunderball. The film retells the basic story of Thunderball, albeit with some new characters and in an updated setting. It reintroduces both SPECTRE and Blofeld (Max von Sydow), although he is not the main villain and neither is the organization disbanded afterwards like in the novel.

=== Video games ===
SPECTRE is shown but never mentioned by name in the game GoldenEye: Rogue Agent. Instead it is referred to as a "powerful criminal organisation." It is depicted as being much more powerful than it was in any of the films or books, possessing a massive undersea black market known as "The Octopus", a large lair built into an extinct volcano, resembling Karl Stromberg (Curd Jürgens)'s Atlantis lair from The Spy Who Loved Me. Also included are the personal structures of its members, such as Auric Goldfinger's Auric Enterprises facility and casino and Dr. No's Crab Key. SPECTRE also possesses extremely advanced technology, such as virtual reality and energy generators in its volcanic lair.

Although the From Russia with Love game mirrors much of the plot of the eponymous film, it uses an organisation called OCTOPUS rather than SPECTRE to avoid copyright issues.

=== Comics ===
A version of SPECTRE similar to the novels was featured in the comic strips published in the Daily Express newspaper between 1958 and 1983. The organisation however didn't appear in the comic books until Eidolon, a miniseries published by Dynamite Entertainment in 2016, written by Warren Ellis and illustrated by Jason Masters. In this comic, SPECTRE has a World War II organisation that is mostly defunct. Loyalists endured as plants and sleeper agents in the aftermath of a Warsaw Pact surge, waiting for the right moment for SPECTRE to have a reformation and resurgence.

== Copyright issues ==
SPECTRE and its characters were at the centre of long-standing litigation between Kevin McClory and Ian Fleming over the film rights to Thunderball and the ownership of the organisation and its characters. In 1963, Fleming settled out of court with McClory, giving him the film rights to Thunderball; the literary rights stayed with Fleming and thus allowed continuation of the use SPECTRE in a number of his novels.

In 1963, EON Productions producers Albert R. Broccoli and Harry Saltzman made an agreement with McClory to adapt the novel into the fourth James Bond film, also stipulating that McClory would not be allowed to make further adaptations of Thunderball for at least ten years after the release. Although SPECTRE and Blofeld were used in a number of films before and after Thunderball, the issue over the copyright of Thunderball prevented SPECTRE and Blofeld from becoming the main villains in 1977's The Spy Who Loved Me. In 1983, McClory released a film based on his Bond rights entitled Never Say Never Again.

In 1998, MGM/UA took legal action against Sony and McClory in the United States to prevent Warhead 2000 AD from going into production. MGM/UA abandoned the claim after settling with Sony. McClory's Bond rights, including his rights in SPECTRE, were unaffected.

On 15 November 2013, MGM and the McClory estate announced that they had formally settled the issue with Danjaq, LLC and MGM had acquired the full copyright to the characters and concepts of Blofeld and SPECTRE. Having lost its mantle of acronym, now simply called Spectre, the organisation and Blofeld were the main antagonists in the first Bond film released after the settlement, Spectre.

== SPECTRE henchmen ==
Henchmen working for SPECTRE, one of its members, or directly for Ernst Stavro Blofeld:

=== Novels ===
- Emilio Largo – Second in command of SPECTRE and designated by Blofeld to oversee all field operations for Thunderball; killed by Domino Vitali.
- Giuseppe Petacchi – An Italian air force pilot, and Domino Vitali's brother; kills the crew aboard the NATO test flight carrying the bombs and flies it to rendezvous with SPECTRE, only to be killed upon delivery.
- Vargas – The assassin who kills Petacchi.
- Fonda – "Number 4", an Italian Artiq who recruited Petacchi for the plot.
- Pierre Borraud – "Number 12", of the Unione Corse; had sex with a girl that he kidnapped for ransom. As a punishment, Blofeld electrocuted Borraud and returned half of the ransom money to the girl's father as compensation. While Blofeld considered the possibility that the sexual relationship was consensual, it was more important that SPECTRE was reputed to keep its word.
- Marius Domingue – "Number 7", another Unione Corse man; highly trustworthy, but singled out by Blofeld for a lecture to throw Borraud off guard.
- Maslov – "Number 18", formerly known as Kandinsky; a Polish electronics expert who resigned from Philips AG.
- Kotze – "Number 5", formerly known as Emil Traut; an East German physicist who defected to the West.
- Fidelio Sciacca – A former member of the Sicilian Mafia, whose uncle is the caporegime of the district where the bullion drop is to take place.
- Strelik – "Number 10", a former SMERSH member; shot dead by Largo for questioning the loyalty of the other SPECTRE members.
- "Number 11" – Another ex-SMERSH operative.
- Count Lippe – "Sub-operator G"; expected to send the Thunderball ransom letter, but his fight with James Bond and subsequent injuries led to a delay in the plan.
- "Number 6" – Kills Lippe at the behest of Blofeld for being unreliable.
- "Number 14" – A former Gestapo officer.
- Bruno Bayer – Another former Gestapo officer.
- "Number 17" – Finds Domino scanning the Disco Volante with a Geiger counter in search of the stolen atomic bombs; reports her to Largo, who takes her prisoner and tortures her.
- Horst Uhlmann - Another former Gestapo officer who Bond tracks down immediately before the events of The Spy Who Loved Me.
- Irma Bunt – Henchwoman in the novel and film On Her Majesty's Secret Service.
- Black Dragon Society

This is only a brief description of the numbers of each member. In the first book to include SPECTRE, Thunderball, it is stated that the numbers of each member changes periodically (it "advances round a rota by two digits at midnight on the first of every month") to avoid detection and Blofeld is in fact "Number 2".

=== Operatives (original continuity) ===
By order of appearance and fate

- Mr. Jones (Dr. No) – takes his own life with cyanide capsule in cigarette. Played by Reginald Carter.
- Professor R. J. Dent (Dr. No) – shot by James Bond (Sean Connery). Played by Anthony Dawson.
- Miss Taro (Dr. No) – arrested by Jamaican police. Played by Zena Marshall.
- Dr. Julius No (Dr. No) – boiled alive in his own nuclear reactor. Played by Joseph Wiseman.
- Donald Grant (From Russia with Love) – stabbed and garrotted by Bond. Played by Robert Shaw.
- Morzeny (From Russia with Love) – burned in boating accident. Played by Walter Gotell.
- Tov Kronsteen (No. 5, From Russia with Love) – killed on Blofeld's orders by Morzeny with poisoned blade in shoe. Played by Vladek Sheybal.
- Colonel Rosa Klebb (No. 3, From Russia with Love) – shot dead by Tatiana Romanova (Daniela Bianchi). Played by Lotte Lenya.
- Colonel Jacques Bouvar (No. 6, Thunderball) – killed by James Bond. Played by Bob Simmons.
- Emilio Largo (No. 2, Thunderball) – shot with a speargun by Domino Derval (Claudine Auger). Played by Adolfo Celi.
- Fiona Volpe (Thunderball) – accidentally shot dead by her henchmen as they try to kill Bond. Played by Luciana Paluzzi.
- Number 9 (Thunderball) – electrocuted by Blofeld for embezzling from Spectre. Played by Clive Cazes.
- Number 11 (Thunderball) – at large. Played by Murray Kash.
- Count Lippe (Thunderball) – killed by Volpe on Blofeld's orders. Played by Guy Doleman.
- Angelo Palazzi (Thunderball) – killed by Largo on Blofeld's orders. Played by Paul Stassino.
- Vargas (Thunderball) – killed with a speargun by James Bond. Played by Philip Locke.
- Janni (Thunderball) – killed when Largo's yacht explodes. Played by Michael Brennan.
- Professor Ladislav Kutze (Thunderball, defected) – last seen jumping into ocean with lifebuoy. Played by George Pravda.
- Quist (Thunderball) – thrown by Largo into shark pool. Played by Bill Cummings.
- Helga Brandt (No.11, You Only Live Twice) – killed in piranha pool by Blofeld for failing to kill Bond. Played by Karin Dor.
- Hans (You Only Live Twice) – thrown into piranha pool by Bond. Played by Ronald Rich.
- Mr. Osato (Head of Osato Chemicals, You Only Live Twice) – shot and killed as "the price of failure" by Blofeld. Played by Teru Shimada.
- Number 3 (You Only Live Twice) – blown up in volcano explosion. Played by Burt Kwouk.
- Number 4 (You Only Live Twice) – fate unknown. Played by Michael Chow.
- Irma Bunt (On Her Majesty's Secret Service) – fate unknown. Played by Ilse Steppat.
- Grunther (On Her Majesty's Secret Service) – killed by Tracy di Vicenzo (Diana Rigg). Played by Yuri Borienko.
- Mr. Wint & Mr. Kidd (Diamonds Are Forever) – Wint killed by Bond with a bomb, Kidd set on fire by Bond and jumps overboard to his death from ocean liner. Played by Bruce Glover and Putter Smith.
- Bert Saxby (Diamonds Are Forever) – shot and killed by CIA agents. Played by Bruce Cabot.

==== By hierarchy ====
SPECTRE Command Structure
Name	Number	Position	Film	Status	Actor
Ernst Stavro Blofeld	1	Leader	From Russia with Love; Thunderball; You Only Live Twice; On Her Majesty's Secret Service; Diamonds Are Forever; For Your Eyes Only; Never Say Never Again (non-EON); Spectre; No Time to Die	Deceased; Alive	Anthony Dawson/Eric Pohlmann; Anthony Dawson/Eric Pohlmann; Donald Pleasence; Telly Savalas; Charles Gray; John Hollis/Robert Rietti; Max von Sydow (non-EON) (Active); Christoph Waltz; Christoph Waltz
Maximilian Largo	1	Unknown	Never Say Never Again (non-EON)	Deceased	Klaus Maria Brandauer (non-EON)
Emilio Largo	2	Second in command and head of extortion	Thunderball	Deceased	Adolfo Celi/Robert Rietti
Rosa Klebb; Unnamed	3	Chief executioner Operative in Blofeld's volcano lair.	From Russia with Love; You Only Live Twice	Deceased	Lotte Lenya; Burt Kwouk
Unnamed	4	Operative in Blofeld's volcano lair.	You Only Live Twice	Unknown	Michael Chow
Tov Kronsteen; Unnamed	5	Chief planner Member	From Russia with Love; Thunderball	Deceased; Unknown	Vladek Sheybal (uncredited in film)
Jacques Bouvar	6	Military Advisor	Thunderball	Deceased	Bob Simmons (uncredited in film)
Unnamed	7	Member	Thunderball	Unknown	Cecil Cheng (uncredited in film)
Unnamed	8	Member	Thunderball	Unknown	Michael Smith (uncredited in film)
Unnamed	9	Member	Thunderball	Deceased	Clive Cazes
Unnamed	10	Member	Thunderball	Unknown	André Maranne (uncredited in film)
Unnamed; Helga Brandt	11	Member	Thunderball; You Only Live Twice	Unknown; Deceased	Murray Kash; Karin Dor
Fatima Blush	12	Member	Never Say Never Again (non-EON)	Deceased	Barbara Carrera
Unnamed	13	Member	Thunderball	Unknown	Gábor Baraker

=== Operatives (rebooted continuity) ===
- Franz Oberhauser / Ernst Stavro Blofeld – the mastermind behind Spectre and its subsidiary Quantum. Attempts to secure a monopoly on the "Nine Eyes" global intelligence initiative and establish Spectre as a supra-national world power. Taken into custody after James Bond (Daniel Craig) shoots down his helicopter. Played by Christoph Waltz.
- Mr. White – high ranking Spectre agent and supervisor of Quantum. Acts as representative between Obanno and Le Chiffre. Kills Le Chiffre and is implied to have killed other failed agents. Grows disenchanted with Spectre, and is poisoned with thallium. Commits suicide after betraying Blofeld to 007 in exchange for his daughter Madeleine Swann (Léa Seydoux)'s safety. Played by Jesper Christensen.
- Le Chiffre – though not a Spectre member, he was a private banker to major terrorists who are introduced through Spectre, until Mr. White executes him with a shot in the head. Played by Mads Mikkelsen.
  - Kratt – Le Chiffre's right-hand man. Presumably killed by Mr. White. Played by Clemens Schick.
  - Valenka – Le Chiffre's girlfriend. Presumably killed by Mr. White. Played by Ivana Miličević.
  - Leo – henchman of Le Chiffre. Arrested after being framed for the deaths of Steven Obanno and Obanno's bodyguard (Michael Offei). Played by Emmanuel Avena.
  - Steven Obanno – high-ranking member of Lord's Resistance Army who had ties to Spectre through Mr. White. Entrusted his money to Le Chiffre, who lost it and was forced to organise a high stakes poker tournament in Montenegro to recoup his losses. Strangled by Bond. Played by Isaach de Bankolé,
  - Alex Dimitrios – a Greek terrorist associated with Le Chiffre who employs two bombers: first Mollaka then Carlos to explode the prototype plane of Skyfleet on the behalf of Le Chiffre. Stabbed with a knife by Bond. Played by Simon Abkarian.
  - Mollaka Danso – a bomb maker from Madagascar employed by Dimitrios to explode the Skyfleet plane. Shot by Bond before starting his mission. Played by Sébastien Foucan.
  - Carlos Nikolic – a bomb maker employed by Dimitrios to replace Mollaka in the attack on the Skyfleet plane. Accidentally blows himself up after Bond puts the bomb destined for the plane onto Carlos' belt. Played by Claudio Santamaria.
  - Adolph Gettler – a Spectre operative acting as Vesper Lynd's handler; Mr. White's second-in-command. Shot in the eye with a nail gun by Bond. Played by Richard Sammel.
  - Craig Mitchell – an undercover Spectre operative placed inside MI6 who deceived both M (Judi Dench) and Bond. Shot by Bond. Played by Glenn Foster.
  - Vesper Lynd – Blackmailed by Mr. White to embezzle Bond's winnings. Drowned herself. Played by Eva Green.
- Dominic Greene – leader of Quantum's Tierra Project and a major official in the organisation. Ran an environmentalist corporation called Greene Planet. Assassinated for betraying Quantum. Played by Mathieu Amalric.
  - Edmund Slate – a freelance assassin hired by Greene to murder Camille Montes (Olga Kurylenko). Stabbed in the neck and then the leg with scissors by Bond. Played by Neil Jackson.
  - Elvis – Greene's main subordinate. Blown up by Bond. Played by Anatole Taubman.
  - Greene's driver – a Quantum operative who served as Greene's chauffeur and bodyguard. Shot by Bond. Played by Carl von Malaisé.
  - General Luiz Medrano – an exiled Bolivian dictator who associates with Dominic Greene to come back to power in Bolivia in exchange of a piece of land in the Atacama desert rich in water that will allow Quantum to have the monopoly of the water and sell it to Bolivia at twice the market price. Shot by Camille Montes. Played by Joaquín Cosío.
  - Lieutenant Orso – lieutenant to General Medrano. Falls to his death of the top floor of the Eco Hotel when pushed by Camille Montes. Played by Jesús Ochoa.
  - Carlos – the chief of the Bolivian Military Police and a friend of René Mathis (Giancarlo Giannini) who betrays him and has him killed on the orders of Greene and Medrano. He is killed with a shot in the head by Bond as revenge for betraying Mathis. Played by Fernando Guillén Cuervo.
- Yusef Kabira – a Quantum operative who functions as a honeypot to deceive foreign intelligence agents. Arrested by MI6. Played by Simon Kassianides.
- Guy Haines – Quantum leader, is a special envoy of the Prime Minister and is one of the PM's most trusted advisers. Is a member of the Quantum identified by Bill Tanner (Rory Kinnear) using Bond's photos from the opera Tosca. Still at large. Played by Paul Ritter.
- Gregor Karakov – Quantum leader, a former politician, owner of several mines in Siberia, is a member of the Quantum identified by Tanner using Bond's photos from the opera Tosca. Still at large. Played by Kamil Krejcí.
- Moishe Soref – Quantum leader, former Mossad agent, and telecom giant. Is a member of the Quantum identified by Tanner using Bond's photos from the opera Tosca. Still at large. Played by Erosi Margiani.
- Raoul Silva – an MI6 agent turned cyberterrorist. With support from the organisation and Blofeld, attempts to gain personal revenge on M for her betrayal. Indirectly succeeds, but is stabbed in the back by Bond before M dies. Played by Javier Bardem.
  - Sévérine – the mistress of Raoul Silva who works for him by fear and tries to be free from him by sending Bond in his pursuit in hopes that Bond kills Silva. She is executed with a shot in the head by Silva for her treason. Played by Bérénice Marlohe.
  - Patrice – a mercenary for hire that is employed by Raoul Silva to steal the drive with the identities of the MI6 cover agents in the NATO missions around the world. Falls to his death from the top of a building after a fight with Bond. Played by Ola Rapace.
- Max Denbigh / C – a Whitehall government bureaucrat appointed as the director of the Joint Intelligence Service and the driving force behind the Nine Eyes program, but is secretly passing intelligence on to Spectre. Falls to his death while trying to avoid arrest. Played by Andrew Scott.
- Mr. Hinx – an assassin and high-ranking member of Spectre. Pursues Bond and Madeleine Swann. Thrown out of a moving train by Bond with a chain around his neck, presumed dead. Played by Dave Bautista.
- Marco Sciarra – a Spectre assassin co-ordinating terrorist attacks around the world. Thrown out of a helicopter by Bond. Played by Alessandro Cremona.
- Moreau – Spectre member, seen during the Rome meeting informing other members about Spectre involvement in distribution of illegal drugs. Still at large. Played by Marc Zinga.
- Guerra – Spectre member, seen during the Rome meeting who volunteers to replace Marco Sciarra in the chase for Mr. White. He is killed by Mr. Hinx to have the assignment of the mission. Played by Benito Sagredo.
- Dr Vogel – Spectre member, seen during the Rome meeting. Killed by Heracles during the Cuba Spectre meeting. Played by Brigitte Millar.
- Lorenzo – One of Spectre's guards seen during the Rome meeting. Thrown to his death by Bond from a balcony onto a large meeting table. Played by Peppe Lanzetta.
- Marco – One of Lucia Sciarra (Monica Bellucci)'s bodyguards who secretly works for Spectre with orders to kill her. Shot in the head by Bond. Played by Matteo Taranto.
- Gostan Safin - A toxicologist before Blofeld ordered Mr. White to assassinate him and his entire family. However, his son, Lyutsifer Safin (Rami Malek) survived and was able to create a terrorist organisation which was strong enough to outsmart and annihilate Spectre.
- Primo - A Spectre assassin who defected and joined Lyutsifer Safin's group after the latter massacred all members of Spectre with Valdo Obruchev (David Dencik)'s help. Played by Dali Benssallah.

=== Non-EON ===
- Maximillian Largo (No. 1, Never Say Never Again). Played by Klaus Maria Brandauer.
- Ernst Stavro Blofeld (No. 2, Never Say Never Again). Played by Max von Sydow.
- Fatima Blush (No. 12, Never Say Never Again). Played by Barbara Carrera.
- Eva Adara (From Russia with Love video game). Voiced by Maria Menounos.

== Acronym in the rest of world ==
- Italy: SPeciale Esecutivo per Controspionaggio, Terrorismo, Ritorsioni e Estorsioni (in English: SPecial Executive for Counter-intelligence, Terrorism, Retaliation and Extortion, because "revenge" in Italian is translated "vendetta").
  - In some Italian movies, the organisation is called SuPremo Esecutivo per Controspionaggio, Terrorismo, Vendette ed Estorsioni (in English: SuPreme Executive for Counter-intelligence, Terrorism, Revenges and Extortion), but is called anyway "SPECTRE".
- Spain: Sociedad Permanente Ejecutiva para el Contraespionaje, Terrorismo, Rebeldía y Aniquilamiento (in English: Permanent Executive Society for Counter-intelligence, Terrorism, Rebellion and Annihilation, the abbreviation changes the last letter in Spanish language)
- France: Service pour l'espionnage, le contre-espionnage, le terrorisme, la rétorsion et l'extorsion (in English: Service for Espionage, Counter-intelligence, Terrorism, Retaliation, and Extortion) – incidentally, the French word spectre means "ghost".
- In the German version of Dr. No it is called GOFTER (GeheimOrganisation Für Terrorismus, Erpressung und Rache) and Phantom (German for Spectre) afterwards. In Never Say Never Again and the Craig films the organisation is called Spectre.

== Parodies and clones ==
SPECTRE has been parodied many times in films, video games, and novels. The most obvious is the Austin Powers series of films, with Dr. Evil (Mike Myers), a parody of Ernst Stavro Blofeld and his second-in-command known as Number Two (Robert Wagner), a parody of Emilio Largo. Other examples are:

- The Belgian comics series Spirou & Fantasio features an international criminal organisation called the Triangle whose members also address each other by numbers.
- Prior to Dr. No, the 1962 film The Road to Hong Kong featured a "third force" organisation the Third Echelon.
- In the video game series No One Lives Forever a man simply called "The Director" (voiced by John Armstrong) leads a similar organisation called "H.A.R.M.". A running joke during the series is that no one actually knows what H.A.R.M. stands for. H.A.R.M may jokingly refer to Human Aetiological Relations Machine, the name of a fictional intelligence agency featured in the 1966 spy film Agent for H.A.R.M..
- The 1964–1968 TV series The Man from U.N.C.L.E. had, as its adversary, a shadowy organisation known as THRUSH (the Terrestrial Hegemony for the Removal of Undesirables and the Subjugation of Humankind). THRUSH (which, in the novels, stood for "Technological Hierarchy for Removal of Undesirables and Subjugation of Humanity") was opposed by the titular United Nations Counterintelligence LEague.
- The 1986 TV series Rambo: The Force of Freedom featured a neo-Nazi organisation known as SAVAGE (Specialist-Administrators of Vengeance, Anarchy, and Global Extortion).
- The 1991 James Bond spin-off animated series, James Bond Jr., featured a clone of SPECTRE called "S.C.U.M." (Saboteurs and Criminals United in Mayhem), headed by a mysterious individual known as Scumlord (voiced by Jeff Bennett).
- The 1982–1985 animated series Inspector Gadget featured a clone of SPECTRE called "M.A.D." (Malevolent Agency of Destruction). Dr. Claw (voiced by Frank Welker and Don Francks), the head of M.A.D., is also based on the villain Blofeld.
- The 1973 Mexican films Chabelo y Pepito vs los Monstruos (Chabelo and Pepito vs. the Monsters) and Chabelo y Pepito Detectives feature a criminal organisation named S.P.E.C.T.R.U.M., which carries two plans to dominate the world. In Chabelo and Pepito vs. the Monsters, they extract uranium from a hill in the Mexican countryside, while in Chabelo and Pepito Detectives, they sell toys that hypnotise children to make them work for them.
- The young adult book series Micro Adventure featured a shady organisation known as BRUTE (the Bureau for Revenge and Universal TErrorism). Its adversary was ACT (the American Counterintelligence Taskforce).
- An organisation known as SCORPIA (Sabotage, CORruPtion, Intelligence, and Assassination) appears in the Alex Rider novels and 2020–2024 TV series as recurring antagonists whose various members clash with the title character Alex Rider (Otto Farrant). Near the end of the Cold War, several secret agents and law enforcers abandoned their loyalty to their countries, and became effectively criminals for hire. Their actions range from supplying biological weapons to engineering terrorism and performing assassinations. They are defeated in the 2009 novel Scorpia Rising and replaced in the 2020 novel Nightshade by an organisation reminiscent of the rebooted James Bond movie continuity's Spectre organization, simply dubbed Nightshade.
- The 1970–1971 TV series Lancelot Link, Secret Chimp featured a shadowy organisation called CHUMP (Unionized Hierarchy for Money, Power, and Control). It was opposed by APE (the Agency of Protection and Enforcement).
- The 1965–1970 TV series Get Smart featured a SPECTRE-like organisation called KAOS.
- In 1983, a highly successful tabletop RPG called James Bond 007: Role-Playing In Her Majesty's Secret Service was released. With the novels and films as inspirations, the stories were adapted for players. Minor changes to plots and villains were made; for example, Wint and Kidd were freelance assassins working for SPECTRE. They in fact leased out services to other terrorist organisations and various crime syndicates. The most noted changes were to SPECTRE: Blofeld's name was changed to Karl Ferenc Skorpios, and he was given a greyhound instead of a white cat; the organisation itself was renamed TAROT (Terrestrial Acquisition and Revenge via Orchestrated Turmoil), with the face cards representing various departments. This was due to the copyright issues referenced above. Victory Games worked with EON productions (the film producers) for the rights to Bond, and were told they were not allowed to negotiate with McClory for the rights to SPECTRE, hence the hasty renaming.
- The 1991–1992 Disney animated series Darkwing Duck featured masked crimefighter Darkwing Duck (voiced by Jim Cummings) who often worked with an agency called S.H.U.S.H. (expanded name unknown) against the forces of F.O.W.L. (the Fiendish Organisation of World Larceny). These organisations also featured in the DuckTales reboot series. During the 2020–2021 third season of the series, F.O.W.L. were the main villains of McDuck family, with its leader and founder, Bradford Buzzard (voiced by Marc Evan Jackson), resembling leader of SPECTRE, Ernst Stavro Blofeld.
- The T.H.U.N.D.E.R. Agents comic featured an enemy called S.P.I.D.E.R. (Secret People's International Directorate for Extralegal Revenue).
- The Galaxy organisation features in the 1966 film Our Man Flint where Agent 0008 (Robert Gunner) tells Derek Flint (James Coburn) that Galaxy is "bigger than SPECTRE".
- Tom Clancy's 1998 novel Rainbow Six features a terrorist organisation that the characters compare to SPECTRE once they learn that the terrorists are using chemical warfare similar to that in On Her Majesty's Secret Service.
- The 2001–2006 ABC TV series Alias featured several SPECTRE-like terrorist espionage organisations such as Alliance of Twelve (with its branch SD-6), the Covenant and Prophet Five.
- The 2004 video game Evil Genius and its 2021 sequel Evil Genius 2: World Domination place the player in command of a SPECTRE-like organisation, complete with a rocket-launching base inside a volcano. Additionally, one of the player's choices of leader (Maximilian) is almost identical in appearance to SPECTRE's leader, Ernst Stavro Blofeld (as he appeared when portrayed by Donald Pleasence in You Only Live Twice).
- In the 2006–2007 British television series The Secret Show, the evil organisation T.H.E.M. (The Horrible Evil Menace) is similar to SPECTRE.
- The 2007–2014 CBBC series M.I. High features the criminal organisation "SKUL" (Super Kriminal Underground League), led by a man known only as The Grandmaster (Julian Bleach) who is always seen stroking a white rabbit called General Flopsy.
- The Spanish comic book Mortadelo y Filemón features a parody of SPECTRE called ABUELA (Agentes Bélicos Ultramarinos Especialistas en Líos Aberrantes – warlike agents overseas specialists in aberrant messes).
- The Matt Helm films featured the Brotherhood of International Government and Order abbreviated as "BIG O".
- Synthesiser company "Waldorf" has a synth named "Blofeld". The computer based "virtual editor" for the Blofeld is called "Spectre". One of Waldorf's virtual synths is called "Largo".
- In the 1998–1999 animated series The Secret Files of the Spy Dogs cartoon, the evil leader of cats, Catastrophe (voiced by Jim Cummings), always appears fondling a rubber mouse.
- An evil organisation named STENCH (Society for the Total Extermination of Non-Conforming Humans) is featured in the 1964 film Carry On Spying.
- James Earl Ray, who committed the assassination of Martin Luther King Jr. on April 4, 1968, used the alias Eric Starvo Galt during 1967, almost certainly a mixture of Ian Fleming and Ayn Rand (referencing the Atlas Shrugged character John Galt). "Ernst" and "Stavro" are peculiar sounds and spellings to American ears and eyes, and he mentally transposed them into "Eric" and "Starvo."
- In The Simpsons eighth season episode "You Only Move Twice" from 1996, an organisation called Globex Corporation directed by supervillain Hank Scorpio (voiced by Albert Brooks) who successfully takes control of the East Coast.
- The Marvel Universe has the organisations HYDRA and A.I.M., which are both opposed by Nick Fury and S.H.I.E.L.D., and are sometimes also opposed by Captain America and the other Marvel heroes, while the DC Universe came up with the organisation H.I.V.E. as an analogue to SPECTRE.
- The Disney Channel's 2002–2007 TV series Kim Possible has the organisation WEE (Worldwide Evil Empire), which is opposed by GJ (Global Justice) and Kim Possible (voiced by Christy Carlson Romano) at times.
- In the 1999 video game Spy Fox 2: "Some Assembly Required", Spy Fox (voiced by Mike Madeoy) battles Napoleon LeRoach (voiced by David Scully) – a member of the Society of Meaningless Evil, Larceny, Lying and Yelling (S.M.E.L.L.Y.).
- In Disney Channel's 2007–2015 and 2025–present TV series Phineas and Ferb, Dr. Heinz Doofenshmirtz (voiced by Dan Povenmire) is occasionally seen as a member of the League Of Villainous Evildoers Maniacally United For Frightening Investments in Naughtiness (L.O.V.E.M.U.F.F.I.N.). Doofenshmirtz is not aware of the acronym until one of the other members points it out. They both were opposed by Perry the Platypus (voiced by Dee Bradley Baker) and other agents of O.W.C.A. (Organization Without a Cool Acronym).
- In "Mermaid Man and Barnacle Boy V", a 2002 season 3 episode of Nickelodeon's TV series SpongeBob SquarePants, Barnacle Boy (voiced by Tim Conway) turns to the dark side and teams up with Man Ray (voiced by John Rhys-Davies) and The Dirty Bubble (voiced by Tom Kenny) and they form an alliance called Every Villain is Lemons (E.V.I.L.).
- In the G.I. Joe toyline, cartoon and comic franchise, there exists an international terrorist organisation known as Cobra, which is similar to SPECTRE.
- The 2008 miniseries Dr Horrible's Sing-Along Blog features a supervillain organisation called the E.L.E. (Evil League of Evil), whose unseen leader Bad Horse is feared by all the members. The main protagonist Dr. Horrible (Neil Patrick Harris) attempts to join the League, and eventually succeeds in doing so.
- The Japanese tokusatsu series Kamen Rider features a Nazi-connected terrorist group known as Shocker (eventually revealed as shorthand for Sacred Hegemony Of Cycle Kindred Evolutionary Realm in the 2005 film reboot Kamen Rider: The First). Employing a vast range of genetically-modified agents known as "modified humans" and henchmen known as Shocker Combatmen, the organisation was headed by a mysterious figure known as The Great Leader (played by Goro Naya) who mainly contacted his agents via voice (who is eventually revealed to be a hooded figure with two forms – a Medusa-inspired humanoid with a head covered by snakes and a cyclops). Shocker was eventually disbanded after one too many defeats at the hands of the show's protagonists and became known as Gel-Shocker after merging with an American criminal group known as Geldam. Gel-Shocker was eventually defeated as well, but subsequent entries of the franchise portrayed the Great Leader in various incarnations to lead various successor organisations, including Destron, Black Satan, the Delza Army, Neo-Shocker, the Badan Empire, Dai-Shocker (later reorganised into Super Shocker), and Space Shocker. The 2016 film Kamen Rider 1 also features a splinter group known as Nova Shocker. The Great Leader also claims to have been the driving force behind two separate terrorist groups known as the Government of Darkness (also known as GOD) and Geddon, though it has never been confirmed.
- The novel 19 by Roger Hall, published in 1970, is about an American unauthorised counter-intelligence group. Several regular intelligence services, though unsure if this rogue group actually exists, nicknamed it "19" because that number repeatedly came up, by apparent coincidence, in their investigations of what might have been 19's activities. When first told about 19 by a CIA friend, the narrator remarks that it sounds like SPECTRE gone straight (although it is misspelled "SPECTER" in 19). Rumor credits 19 with major roles in exposing Kim Philby and Rudolf Abel, among other achievements.

== See also ==
- List of James Bond villains
