= List of James Bond films =

Films featuring James Bond

James Bond is a character created by British novelist Ian Fleming in 1953. A British secret agent working for MI6 under the codename 007, Bond has been portrayed on film in twenty-seven productions by actors Sean Connery, David Niven, George Lazenby, Roger Moore, Timothy Dalton, Pierce Brosnan, and Daniel Craig, with one film in development with actor Robert Pattinson in the role. Eon Productions, which now holds the adaptation rights to all of Fleming's Bond novels, made all but two entries in the film series.

In 1961, producers Albert R. Broccoli and Harry Saltzman purchased the filming rights to Fleming's novels. They founded Eon Productions and, with financial backing by United Artists, produced Dr. No, directed by Terence Young and featuring Connery as Bond. Following its release in 1962, Broccoli and Saltzman created the holding company Danjaq to ensure future productions in the James Bond film series. The Eon series currently has twenty-five films, with the most recent, No Time to Die, released in September 2021. With a combined gross of $7.8 billion to date, it is the fifth-highest-grossing film series in nominal terms. Adjusting for inflation, the series has earned over $19.2 billion in 2022 dollars from box-office receipts alone, (Note: By converting the total 2005-adjusted box-office gross of $12.676 billion to 2022 dollars, the current inflation-adjusted box-office as of 2022 is approximately $19.2 billion) with non-Eon entries pushing this inflation-adjusted figure to a grand total in excess of $20 billion.

The films have won six Academy Awards: for Sound Effects (now Sound Editing) in Goldfinger (at the 37th Awards); to John Stears for Visual Effects in Thunderball (at the 38th Awards); to Per Hallberg and Karen Baker Landers for Sound Editing and to Adele and Paul Epworth for Original Song in Skyfall (at the 85th Awards); to Sam Smith and Jimmy Napes for Original Song in Spectre (at the 88th Awards); and to Billie Eilish and Finneas O'Connell for Original Song in No Time to Die (at the 94th Awards). Several other songs produced for the films have been nominated for Academy Awards for Original Song, including Paul McCartney's "Live and Let Die", Carly Simon's "Nobody Does It Better", and Sheena Easton's "For Your Eyes Only". In 1982, Albert R. Broccoli received the Irving G. Thalberg Memorial Award.

When Broccoli and Saltzman bought the rights to existing and future Fleming titles, the deal did not include Casino Royale, which had been sold to producer Gregory Ratoff for a television adaptation in 1954. After Ratoff's death, the rights passed to Charles K. Feldman, who subsequently produced the Bond spoof Casino Royale in 1967. A legal case ensured that the film rights to the novel Thunderball were held by Kevin McClory, as he, Fleming and scriptwriter Jack Whittingham had written a film script on which the novel was based. Although Eon Productions and McClory joined forces to produce Thunderball, McClory still retained the rights to the story and adapted Thunderball into the 1983 non-Eon entry Never Say Never Again. Distribution rights to both of those films are currently held by Metro-Goldwyn-Mayer, which distributes Eon's regular series. In February 2025, Amazon MGM Studios announced that they had gained full creative control of the franchise and that long-serving producers Barbara Broccoli and Michael G. Wilson would step down from producing future films in the series, although they would remain co-owners. On 25 March 2025, Amazon MGM announced that producers Amy Pascal and David Heyman have been selected to produce the next James Bond film.

== Eon films ==
Eon films
Title	Year	Bond actor	Director	Box office (millions)		Budget (millions)		Ref(s)
Title	Year	Bond actor	Director	Actual $	Adjusted $ (2025)	Actual $	Adjusted $ (2025)	Ref(s)
Dr. No	1962	Sean Connery	Terence Young	59.5	739.8	1.1	11.5	
From Russia with Love	1963	Sean Connery	Terence Young	78.9	896.4	2.0	20.8	
Goldfinger	1964	Sean Connery	Guy Hamilton	124.9	1,352.4	3.0	30.7	
Thunderball	1965	Sean Connery	Terence Young	141.2	1,398.1	6.8	69.1	
You Only Live Twice	1967	Sean Connery	Lewis Gilbert	111.6	847.7	10.3	98.7	
On Her Majesty's Secret Service	1969	George Lazenby	Peter R. Hunt	64.6	480.5	7.0	61.5	
Diamonds Are Forever	1971	Sean Connery	Guy Hamilton	116.0	729.5	7.2	57.2	
Live and Let Die	1973	Roger Moore	Guy Hamilton	126.4	758.8	7.0	50.8	
The Man with the Golden Gun	1974	Roger Moore	Guy Hamilton	97.6	550.6	7.0	45.7	
The Spy Who Loved Me	1977	Roger Moore	Lewis Gilbert	185.4	878.6	14.0	74.3	
Moonraker	1979	Roger Moore	Lewis Gilbert	210.3	881.9	34.0	150.8	
For Your Eyes Only	1981	Roger Moore	John Glen	194.9	740.8	28.0	99.2	
Octopussy	1983	Roger Moore	John Glen	183.7	616.2	27.5	88.9	
A View to a Kill	1985	Roger Moore	John Glen	152.4	453.7	30.0	89.8	
The Living Daylights	1987	Timothy Dalton	John Glen	191.2	516.8	40.0	113.4	
Licence to Kill	1989	Timothy Dalton	John Glen	156.2	413.6	36.0	93.5	
GoldenEye	1995	Pierce Brosnan	Martin Campbell	352.0	854.7	60.0	126.8	
Tomorrow Never Dies	1997	Pierce Brosnan	Roger Spottiswoode	333.0	763.6	110.0	220.7	
The World Is Not Enough	1999	Pierce Brosnan	Michael Apted	361.8	724.5	135.0	261.0	
Die Another Day	2002	Pierce Brosnan	Lee Tamahori	432.0	767.2	142.0	254.2	
Casino Royale	2006	Daniel Craig	Martin Campbell	606.0	971.6	150.0	247.3	
Quantum of Solace	2008	Daniel Craig	Marc Forster	586.1	847.7	200.0	299.0	
Skyfall	2012	Daniel Craig	Sam Mendes	1,108.6	1,554.7	150–200	210–280	
Spectre	2015	Daniel Craig	Sam Mendes	880.7	1,196.2	245–250 (Note: The official production budget for Spectre has been debated. Estimates range from $245–250 to as high as $300–350 million. The $350 million figure also incorporates the $100 million marketing budget.)	333–340	
No Time to Die	2021	Daniel Craig	Cary Joji Fukunaga	771.2	916.3	250–301	297–358	
Total of Eon-produced films				7,623	20,852	1,703–1,809	3,397–3,535	

=== Dr. No (1962) ===
Strangways, the British Intelligence (SIS) Station Chief in Jamaica, is killed. In response, British agent James Bond—also known as 007—is sent to Jamaica to investigate the circumstances. During his investigation Bond meets Quarrel, a Cayman fisherman, who had been working with Strangways around the nearby islands to collect mineral samples. One of the islands was Crab Key, home to the reclusive Dr. No.

Bond visits the island, where he meets a local shell diver, Honey Ryder. The three are attacked by No's men, who kill Quarrel using a flamethrowing armoured tractor; Bond and Honey are taken prisoner. Dr. No informs them he is a member of SPECTRE, the Special Executive for Counter-intelligence, Terrorism, Revenge and Extortion, and he plans to disrupt the Project Mercury space launch from Cape Canaveral with his atomic-powered radio beam. Bond and Honey escape from the island, killing No and blowing up his compound in the process.

=== From Russia with Love (1963) ===
SPECTRE's expert planner Kronsteen, known as "Number Five", upon order of the organisation's Number One, devises a plot to steal a Lektor cryptographic device from the Soviets and sell it back to them while exacting revenge on Bond for killing their agent Dr. No; ex-SMERSH operative Rosa Klebb, SPECTRE's Number Three, is in charge of the mission. She recruits Donald "Red" Grant as an assassin and Tatiana Romanova, a cipher clerk at the Soviet consulate in Istanbul, as the unwitting bait.

Bond travels to Turkey and meets Ali Kerim Bey, the MI6 officer in Turkey. Between them, they obtain the Lektor, and the three escape with the device on the Orient Express. However, they are followed by Grant, who kills Kerim Bey and a Soviet security officer. Grant pretends to be another British agent and meets Bond. Over dinner Grant drugs Romanova, then overcomes Bond. Bond tricks Grant into opening Bond's attaché case in the manner that detonates its tear gas booby trap, allowing Bond to attack and kill him. Bond and Romanova escape with the Lektor to Venice. Rosa Klebb, disguised as a hotel maid, attempts to steal the Lektor and kill Bond, but ends up being shot by Romanova.

=== Goldfinger (1964) ===
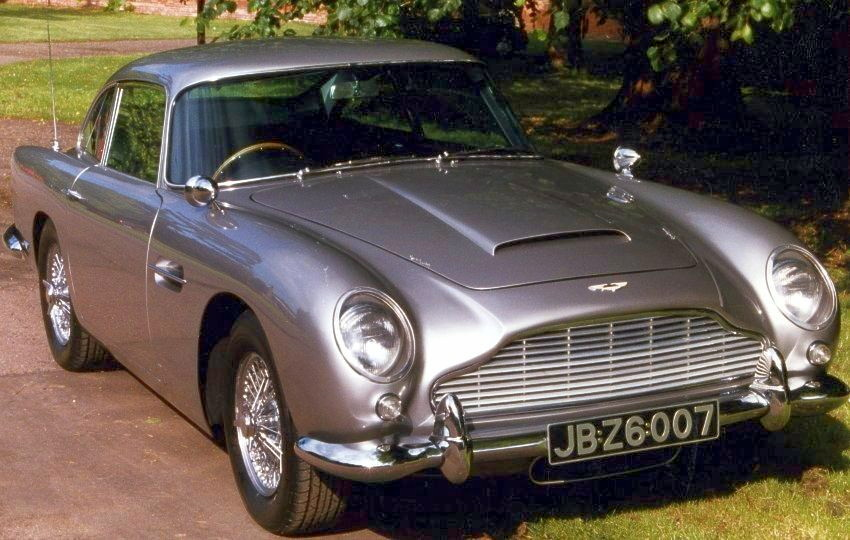
James Bond's Aston Martin DB5 debuted in Goldfinger and also appears in Thunderball, GoldenEye, Tomorrow Never Dies, Skyfall, Spectre and No Time to Die.

Bond is ordered to observe bullion dealer Auric Goldfinger. He suspects Goldfinger of cheating at cards and foils his scheme by distracting his female accomplice, who is later killed by Goldfinger's Korean manservant and henchman Oddjob after Bond seduces her. Bond is then instructed to investigate Goldfinger's gold smuggling operation and he tails the dealer to Switzerland. Bond is captured when he reconnoitres Goldfinger's plant and is drugged unconscious; Goldfinger then transports Bond to his Kentucky stud farm where he holds Bond captive. Bond escapes briefly to witness Goldfinger's meeting with US mafiosi, observing secretly as Goldfinger presents to the gangsters his plans to rob Fort Knox by using materials they have smuggled to him and later kills them to avoid paying his dues.

Bond is recaptured after hearing the details of the operation, but he subsequently seduces Pussy Galore, Goldfinger's private pilot, and convinces her to inform the American authorities. Goldfinger's private army breaks into Fort Knox and accesses the vault, where Bond fights and kills Oddjob, while American troops battle with Goldfinger's army outside. Bond's plane is hijacked by Goldfinger, but Bond struggles with him and shoots out a window, creating an explosive decompression, killing Goldfinger.

=== Thunderball (1965) ===
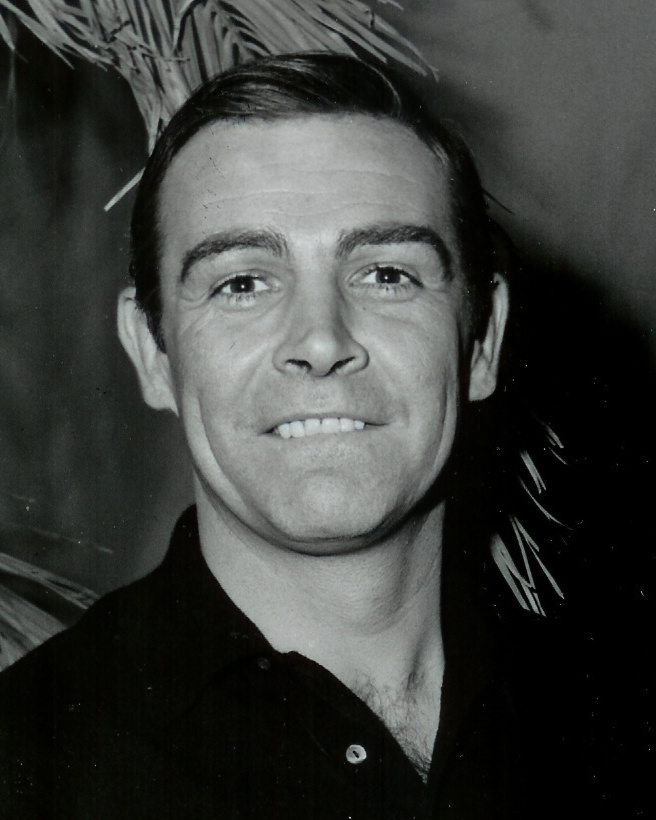
Sean Connery during the production of Thunderball in 1965

Bond investigates the hijacking of an Avro Vulcan loaded with two atomic bombs, which had been taken by SPECTRE. The organisation demands a ransom for the return of the bombs. Bond follows a lead to the Bahamas, where he meets up with his CIA counterpart and friend Felix Leiter. The pair suspect a rich playboy, Emilio Largo, who is soon discovered to be SPECTRE's Number Two, ordered by the secretive Number One to direct the operation, and search the area around his yacht and then the area where they think the yacht may have travelled. After finding the plane—but without the nuclear devices on board—the two agents arrange for Largo's yacht to be tracked and ambushed once the bombs are being moved by Largo.

=== You Only Live Twice (1967) ===
007 is sent to Japan to investigate the spacecraft theft and astronaut kidnapping in orbit of American Project Gemini spacecraft Jupiter 16 by an unidentified spacecraft. Upon his arrival, Bond is contacted by Aki, assistant to the Japanese secret service leader Tiger Tanaka. Bond established that the mastermind behind the hijacking is SPECTRE's Number One, Ernst Stavro Blofeld, in conjunction with Osato, a local industrialist. Bond follows the trail to Blofeld's volcano headquarters and spaceport, while the spacecraft, Bird One, attacks a Soviet capsule. Blofeld explains to Bond that his plot is to fake in front of each superpower that Bird One is an enemy spacecraft to transform the Cold War into World War III.

Tanaka's ninja troops attack the base, while Bond manages to distract Blofeld and create a diversion which allows him to open the hatch, letting in the ninjas. During the battle, Osato is killed by Blofeld, who activates the base's self-destruct system and escapes. Bond, Kissy, Tanaka and the surviving ninjas escape through the cave tunnel before it explodes, and are rescued by submarine.

=== On Her Majesty's Secret Service (1969) ===
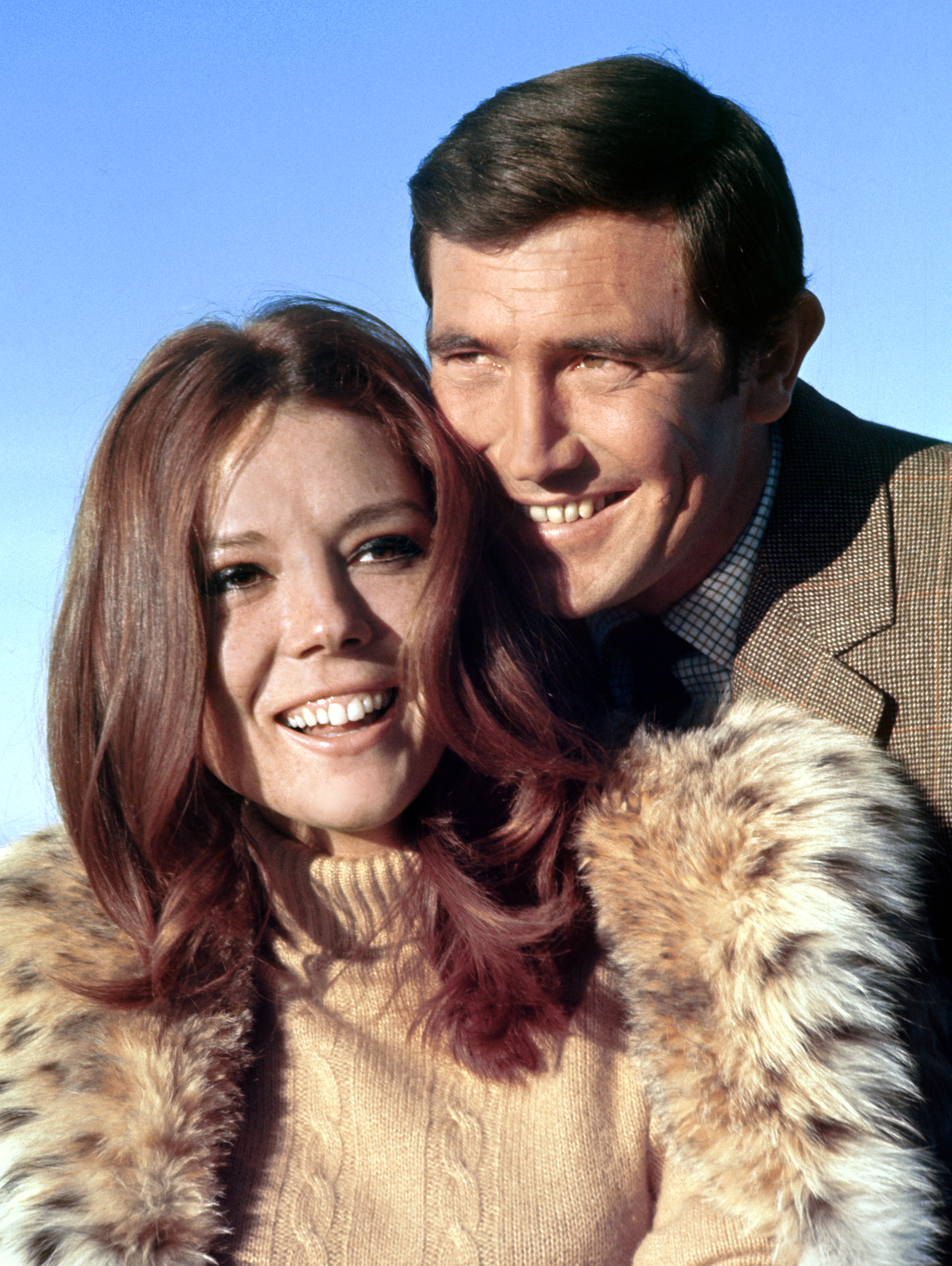
Bond actor George Lazenby with Diana Rigg while filming On Her Majesty's Secret Service in 1969

While searching for Blofeld, the head of SPECTRE, Bond (played by George Lazenby) saves Tracy di Vicenzo (Diana Rigg) on the beach from committing suicide by drowning, and later meets her again in a casino. Bond then receives information from Marc-Ange Draco, the head of the European crime syndicate Unione Corse and Tracy's father, about Blofeld's Swiss solicitor. Bond breaks into the solicitor's office and establishes Blofeld is corresponding with the London College of Arms. Posing as an emissary of the college, Bond meets Blofeld, who has established a clinical allergy-research institute atop Piz Gloria in the Swiss Alps. Bond soon establishes that Blofeld is brainwashing his patients to distribute bacteriological warfare agents throughout various parts of the world.

Bond escapes from the clinic after Blofeld identifies him as a British agent. Bond arranges a raid on the clinic using men from Draco's organisation. The raid is a success, although Blofeld escapes. Bond marries Tracy, but she is murdered shortly afterwards by Irma Bunt, Blofeld's partner.

=== Diamonds Are Forever (1971) ===
Bond (played by a returning Sean Connery) is tasked with investigating a major diamond smuggling ring which begins in Africa and runs through Holland and the UK to the United States. Disguised as professional smuggler and murderer Peter Franks, Bond travels to Amsterdam to meet contact Tiffany Case: he is given the diamonds and travels on to the US, where he is met by Felix Leiter. Bond moves through the chain, which leads to the Whyte House, a casino-hotel owned by the reclusive billionaire Willard Whyte.

Bond follows the diamonds to a pick-up by Bert Saxby, Whyte's head of security, and then onto a research laboratory owned by Whyte, where he finds that a satellite is being built by a laser refraction specialist, Professor Dr. Metz. Suspecting Whyte, Bond tries to confront him, but instead meets Blofeld, who captures the agent and explains to him that the satellite can blow up nuclear missiles. Blofeld admits that he intends to auction it to the highest bidder. Bond escapes and frees the captive Whyte and they establish that Blofeld is using an offshore oil rig as his base. Bond attacks the rig, stopping Blofeld's operation and dispersing his organisation.

=== Live and Let Die (1973) ===
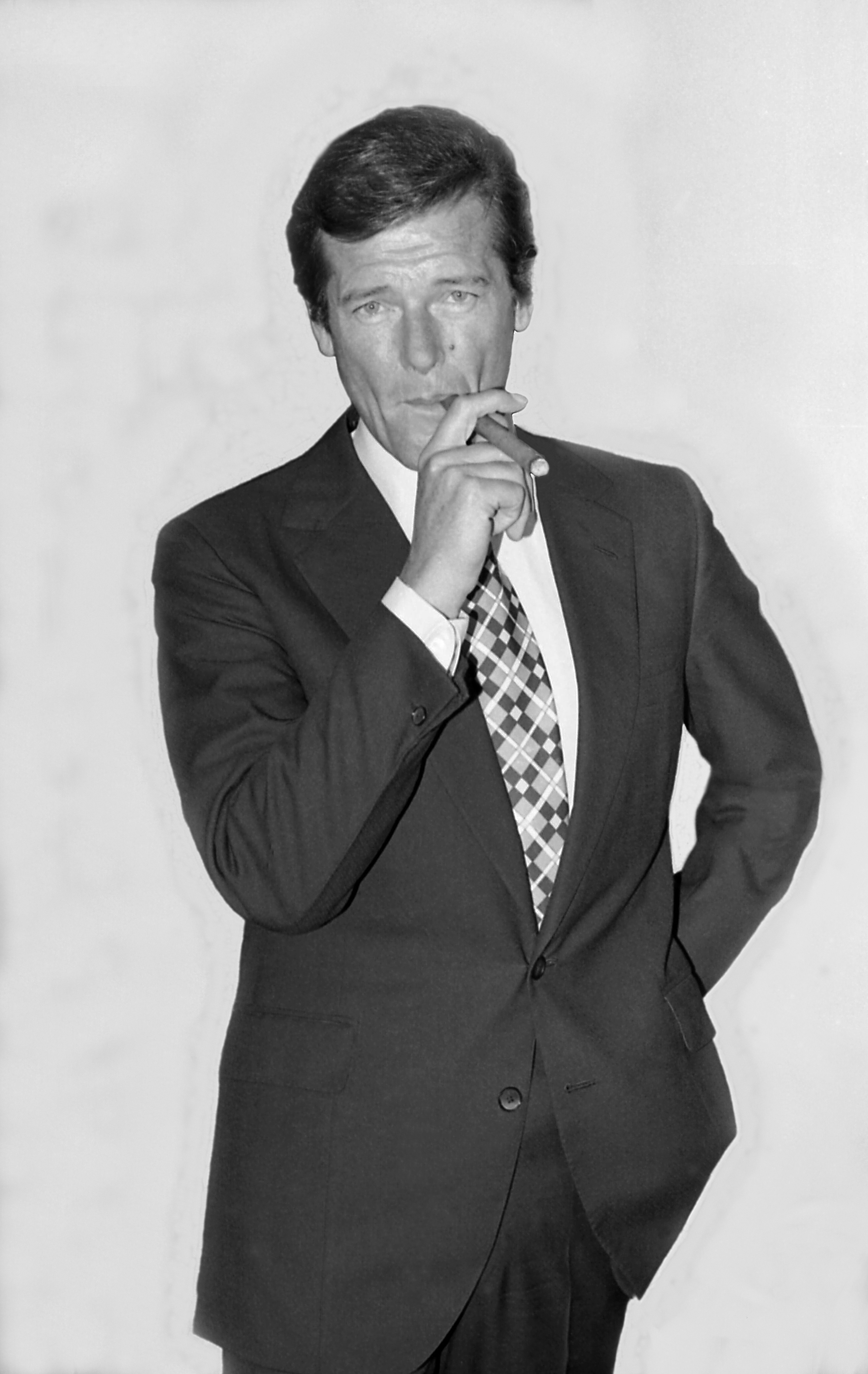
Roger Moore in 1973

James Bond (played by Roger Moore) is sent to investigate the murder of three British MI6 agents, all of whom have been killed within 24 hours. The victims were all separately investigating the operations of Dr. Kananga, the dictator of a small Caribbean island, San Monique. Bond discovers that Kananga also acts as Mr. Big, a ruthless and cunning American gangster.

Upon visiting San Monique, Bond determines that Kananga is producing two tons of heroin and is protecting the poppy fields by exploiting locals' fear of voodoo and the occult. Through his alter ego, Mr. Big, Kananga plans to distribute the heroin free of charge at his Fillet of Soul restaurants, which will increase the number of addicts. Bond is captured by Kananga, but he escapes, killing Kananga and destroying the poppy crop.

=== The Man with the Golden Gun (1974) ===
After receiving a golden bullet with James Bond's code "007" etched into its surface M relieves Bond of a mission locating a British scientist, Gibson, who has invented the "Solex agitator", a device to harness solar power, thereby solving the energy crisis. The bullet signifies that Bond is a target of assassin Francisco Scaramanga and Bond sets out unofficially to find him. From a spent golden bullet, Bond tracks Scaramanga to Macau, where he sees Scaramanga's mistress collecting golden bullets at a casino. Bond follows her to Hong Kong, where he witnesses the murder of Gibson and the theft of the Solex agitator. Bond is subsequently assigned to retrieve the agitator and assassinate Scaramanga.

Bond meets with Hai Fat, a wealthy Thai entrepreneur suspected of arranging Gibson's murder, and is captured, but subsequently escapes. He tracks Scaramanga to an island in Red Chinese waters, where the two men fight and Bond kills the assassin.

=== The Spy Who Loved Me (1977) ===
Bond is tasked with investigating the disappearance of British and Soviet ballistic missile submarines and the subsequent offer to sell a submarine tracking system. Bond works alongside Major Anya Amasova of the KGB. The pair track the plans across Egypt and identify the person responsible for the thefts as shipping tycoon, scientist and anarchist Karl Stromberg.

Bond and Amasova follow a suspicious tanker owned by Stromberg and establish it is responsible for the missing submarines; the submarine in which they are travelling is also captured by Stromberg. Stromberg plans to destroy Moscow and New York, triggering nuclear war, and to then establish a new civilisation. Bond escapes, freeing the submariners captured from the other submarines, and follows Stromberg to his headquarters, where he shoots the tycoon and a torpedo destroys the base.

=== Moonraker (1979) ===
A Drax Industries Moonraker space shuttle on loan is hijacked and Bond is ordered to investigate. Bond meets the owner of the company, Hugo Drax and one of Drax's scientists, Dr. Holly Goodhead. Bond follows the trail to Venice, where he establishes that Drax is manufacturing a nerve gas deadly to humans, but harmless to animals. Bond again meets Goodhead and finds out that she is a CIA agent.

Bond travels to the Amazon looking for Drax's research facility, where he is captured. He and Goodhead pose as pilots on one of six space shuttles being sent by Drax to a hidden space station. There Bond finds out that Drax plans to destroy all human life by launching fifty globes containing the toxin into the Earth's atmosphere. Bond and Goodhead disable the radar jammer hiding the station from Earth and the US sends a platoon of Marines in a military space shuttle. During the battle, Bond kills Drax and his station is destroyed.

=== For Your Eyes Only (1981) ===
After a British spy boat sinks, a marine archaeologist, Sir Timothy Havelock, is tasked to retrieve its Automatic Targeting Attack Communicator (ATAC) communication system before the Russians do. After Havelock is murdered by Gonzales, a Cuban hit-man, Bond is ordered to find out who hired Gonzales. While investigating, Bond is captured, but Gonzales is subsequently killed by Havelock's daughter Melina, and she and Bond escape. Bond identifies one of those present with Gonzales as Emile Leopold Locque and so follows a lead to Italy and meets his contact, Luigi Ferrara, and a well-connected Greek businessman and intelligence informant, Aris Kristatos. Kristatos tells Bond that Locque is employed by Milos Columbo, Kristatos' former organised crime partner.

After Ferrara is murdered—and the evidence points to Columbo—Bond is captured by men working for Columbo. Columbo then explains that Locque was actually hired by Kristatos, who is working for the KGB to retrieve the ATAC. Bond and Melina recover the ATAC but are captured by Kristatos. They escape and follow Kristatos to Greece, where he is killed and the ATAC is destroyed by Bond.

=== Octopussy (1983) ===
Bond investigates the murder of 009, killed in East Berlin while dressed as a circus clown and carrying a fake Fabergé egg. An identical egg appears at auction and Bond establishes the buyer, exiled Afghan prince Kamal Khan, is working with Orlov, a renegade Soviet general, who is seeking to expand Soviet borders into Europe. Bond meets Octopussy, a wealthy woman who leads the Octopus cult. Bond finds out that Orlov has been supplying Khan with priceless Soviet treasures, replacing them with replicas, while Khan has been smuggling the real versions into the West via Octopussy's circus troupe.

Bond infiltrates the circus and finds that Orlov replaced the Soviet treasures with a nuclear warhead primed to explode at a US Air Force base in West Germany. The explosion would trigger Europe into seeking disarmament, in the belief that the bomb was an American one that was detonated by accident, leaving the West's borders open to Soviet invasion. Bond deactivates the warhead and then he returns to India, joining an assault on Khan's palace.

=== A View to a Kill (1985) ===
Bond investigates millionaire industrialist Max Zorin, who is trying to corner the world market in microchips. He establishes that Zorin was previously trained and financed by the KGB, but has now gone rogue. Zorin unveils to a group of investors his plan to destroy Silicon Valley, which will give him a monopoly in the manufacturing of microchips.

Bond uncovers Zorin's plan is to detonate explosives beneath the lakes along the Hayward and San Andreas faults, which will cause them to flood. A larger bomb in a mine will destroy a "geological lock" that prevents the two faults from moving at the same time. Bond destroys the bomb, and subsequently kills Zorin.

=== The Living Daylights (1987) ===
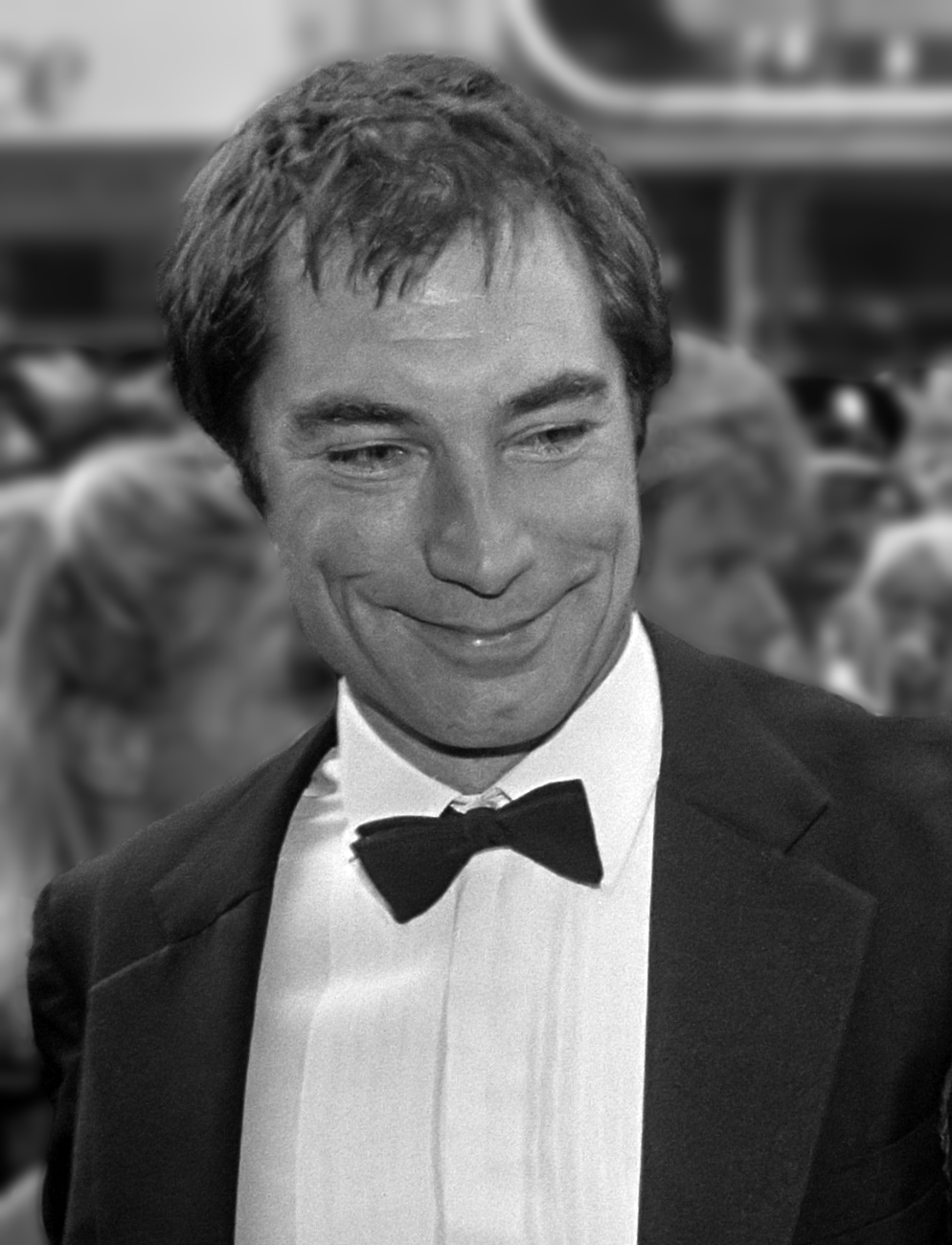
Timothy Dalton in 1987

Bond (played by Timothy Dalton) aids the defection of KGB officer General Georgi Koskov, by wounding a female KGB sniper, Kara Milovy, a cellist. During his debriefing Koskov alleges that the KGB's old policy of Smiert Spionam, meaning Death to Spies, has been revived by General Leonid Pushkin, its new head. Koskov is subsequently abducted from the safe-house and Bond is ordered to kill Pushkin.

Bond tracks down Milovy and establishes she is Koskov's girlfriend and that the defection was staged. He subsequently finds out that Koskov is a friend of the arms dealer Brad Whitaker. After meeting Pushkin and faking his assassination, Bond investigates a scheme by Koskov and Whitaker to embezzle KGB funds and use them to purchase diamonds, which they then use to purchase drugs. After Koskov purchases the drugs, Bond destroys them. Koskov is subsequently arrested by Pushkin, while Bond kills Whitaker.

=== Licence to Kill (1989) ===
Bond aids Felix Leiter in the capture of drug lord Franz Sanchez, who escapes and maims Leiter, killing Leiter's wife. Bond swears revenge, but is ordered to return to duty by M. Bond refuses, and M revokes his licence to kill, causing Bond to become a rogue agent. Although officially stripped of his status, Bond is unofficially given help by Q.

Bond journeys to Sanchez's home in the Republic of Isthmus and is taken on to Sanchez's staff, where he manages to raise Sanchez's suspicions against a number of his employees. When Bond is taken to Sanchez's main base and drugs refinery, he is recognised by one of Sanchez's men and captured. He escapes, destroying the refinery in the process, and pursues Sanchez, killing him.

=== GoldenEye (1995) ===
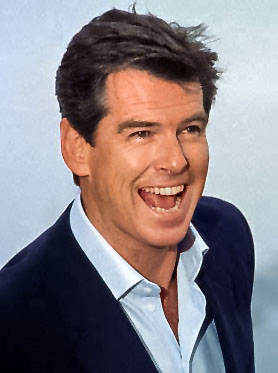
Pierce Brosnan at the 2002 Cannes Film Festival for the press conference of Die Another Day

In 1986, Bond (played by Pierce Brosnan) and Alec Trevelyan—agent 006—infiltrate an illicit Soviet chemical weapons facility and plant explosive charges. Trevelyan is shot, but Bond escapes from the facility as it explodes. Nine years later, Bond witnesses the theft by criminal organisation Janus of a prototype Eurocopter Tiger helicopter that can withstand an electromagnetic pulse. Janus uses the helicopter to steal the control disk for the dual GoldenEye satellite weapons, using the GoldenEye to destroy the complex with an electromagnetic pulse; there are two survivors of the attack, the programmers Natalya Simonova and Boris Grishenko.

Bond investigates the attack and travels to Russia where he locates Simonova and learns that Trevelyan, who had faked his own death, was the head of Janus. Simonova tracks computer traffic to Cuba and she and Bond travel there and locate Trevelyan, who reveals his plan to steal money from the Bank of England before erasing all of its financial records with the GoldenEye, concealing the theft and destroying Britain's economy. Bond and Simonova destroy the satellite facility, killing Trevelyan and Grishenko in the process.

=== Tomorrow Never Dies (1997) ===
Bond investigates the sinking of a British warship in Chinese waters, the theft of one of the ship's cruise missiles, and the shooting down of a Chinese fighter plane. He uncovers a link to media mogul Elliot Carver which suggests that Carver had purchased a GPS encoder on the black market.

Bond encounters Chinese agent Wai Lin, who is also investigating the matter, and the two agree to work together. They discover that Carver had used the GPS encoder to push the British ship off course and into Chinese waters to incite a war for ratings. With the British fleet on their way to China, Bond and Wai Lin find Carver's stealth ship, board it and prevent the firing of a British cruise missile at Beijing. They blow a hole in the ship, exposing it to radar, leading to its sinking and thus averting war between Britain and China.

=== The World Is Not Enough (1999) ===
Bond recovers money for Sir Robert King, a British oil tycoon and friend of M, but the money is booby-trapped and kills King shortly afterwards. Bond traces the money to Renard, a KGB agent-turned-terrorist, who had previously kidnapped King's daughter Elektra. MI6 believes that Renard is targeting Elektra King a second time and Bond is assigned to protect her; the pair are subsequently attacked.

Bond visits Valentin Zukovsky and is informed that Elektra's head of security, Davidov, is in league with Renard: Bond kills Davidov and follows the trail to a Russian ICBM base in Kazakhstan. Posing as a Russian nuclear scientist, Bond meets American nuclear physicist Christmas Jones. The two witness Renard stealing the GPS locator card and a half quantity of weapons-grade plutonium from a bomb and set off an explosion, from which Bond and Jones escape. Elektra kidnaps M after she thinks Bond had been killed and Bond establishes that Elektra intends to create a nuclear explosion in a submarine in Istanbul to increase the value of her own oil pipeline. Bond frees M, kills Elektra and then disarms the bomb on the submarine, where he kills Renard.

=== Die Another Day (2002) ===
Bond investigates North Korean Colonel Tan-Sun Moon, who is illegally trading African conflict diamonds for weapons. Moon is apparently killed and Bond is captured and tortured for 14 months, after which he is exchanged for Zao, Moon's assistant. Despite being suspended on his return, he decides to complete his mission and tracks down Zao to a gene therapy clinic, where patients can have their appearances altered through DNA restructuring. Zao escapes, but the trail leads to British billionaire Gustav Graves.

Graves unveils a mirror satellite, "Icarus", which is able to focus solar energy on a small area and provide year-round sunshine for crop development. Bond discovers that Moon has also undergone the gene therapy and has assumed the identity of Graves. Bond then exposes Moon's plan: to use the Icarus as a sun gun to cut a path through the Korean Demilitarized Zone with concentrated sunlight, allowing North Korean troops to invade South Korea and reunite the countries through force. Bond disables the Icarus controls, kills Moon and stops the invasion.

=== Casino Royale (2006) ===
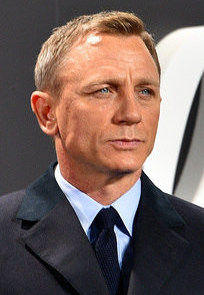
Daniel Craig at the Berlin premiere of Spectre in October 2015

This serves as a reboot of the series, with Bond (played by Daniel Craig) gaining his 00 status in the pre-credits sequence. Bond tracks down and kills a bomb-maker and takes his mobile phone. Searching through the phone, Bond discovers a text message which he traces to Alex Dimitrios, and then on to terrorist financier Le Chiffre, who short-sells stock in successful companies and then engineers terrorist attacks to sink their share prices. Bond foils Le Chiffre's plan to destroy the prototype Skyfleet airliner, which forces Le Chiffre to set up a high-stakes poker tournament at the Casino Royale to recoup his fortune. Bond is instructed to beat Le Chiffre and is aided by a member of HM Treasury, Vesper Lynd.

Bond beats Le Chiffre at the poker table, but Lynd is kidnapped by Le Chiffre after the game, as is Bond, who is captured while pursuing them; Lynd is ransomed for the money and Bond is tortured. Le Chiffre is subsequently killed by Mr. White, a liaison between Le Chiffre and a number of his clients. Bond learns that his poker winnings were never repaid to the Treasury, which Lynd was supposed to have done, and establishes that she was a double agent. Bond pursues her and is attacked by members of White's organisation: he survives, but White takes the money and Lynd sacrifices herself to save Bond, as he later finds out from M. Bond subsequently finds and captures White.

=== Quantum of Solace (2008) ===
Bond and M interrogate Mr. White regarding his organisation, Quantum. M's bodyguard, Mitchell, a double agent, attacks M, enabling White to escape. Bond traces the organisation to Haiti and a connection to environmentalist Dominic Greene.

Bond uncovers a plot between Greene and an exiled Bolivian General, Medrano, to put Medrano in power in Bolivia while Quantum is given a monopoly to run the water supply to the country. Bond ascertains that Quantum is damming Bolivia's supply of fresh water to force the price up. With help from Bolivian secret agent Camille Montes, Bond attacks the hotel where Greene and Medrano are finalising their plans and leaves Greene stranded in the desert with only a tin of engine oil to drink. Bond then finds Vesper's former lover and member of Quantum, Yusef Kabira, bringing him to justice.

=== Skyfall (2012) ===
After an operation in Istanbul ends in disaster, Bond is missing and presumed to be dead. In the aftermath, questions are raised over M's ability to run MI6, and she becomes the subject of a government review over her handling of the situation. The Service itself is attacked, prompting Bond's return to London. His presence assists MI6's investigation in uncovering a lead, and Bond is sent to Shanghai and Macau in pursuit of a mercenary named Patrice. There, he establishes a connection to Raoul Silva, a former MI6 agent who was captured and tortured by Chinese agents. Blaming M for his imprisonment, Silva sets in motion a plan to ruin her reputation before murdering her. Bond saves M and attempts to lure Silva into a trap, and while he is successful in repelling Silva's assault, M is killed. Bond returns to active duty under the command of the new M, Gareth Mallory.

=== Spectre (2015) ===
Following her death in Skyfall, M sends Bond a posthumous message that leads him to thwart a terrorist attack in Mexico City. Gareth Mallory takes Bond off active duty for his illegal operation, but Bond continues his investigation off the books. The trail leads him first to Rome, where he learns of a sinister terrorist organisation known as SPECTRE, and later to Austria. There he finds former adversary Mr. White, who has become terminally ill after being poisoned by Spectre. White asks Bond to protect his daughter Madeleine Swann from Spectre and its leader, Franz Oberhauser, before committing suicide.

Meanwhile, Mallory comes under pressure to have British intelligence join a global intelligence-sharing network code-named "Nine Eyes". With Swann's help, Bond tracks Spectre to Morocco and learns that Spectre is behind the terror attacks, creating a need for Nine Eyes. Spectre controls Nine Eyes, giving them access to the intelligence-sharing network. Oberhauser captures and tortures Bond, revealing that his father was Bond's guardian after the deaths of Bond's parents. Jealous of the attention and care that his father gave to the young James Bond, Oberhauser faked his own death while at the same time murdering his own father. Now known as Ernst Stavro Blofeld, he claims responsibility for everything Bond has suffered in his career. Bond and Swann escape and return to London where Bond joins forces with Mallory and Q to shut down Nine Eyes and apprehend Blofeld.

=== No Time to Die (2021) ===
Five years after Blofeld's imprisonment, Bond is retired and living in Jamaica when Felix Leiter and his colleague Logan Ash enlist his help in searching for the missing MI6 scientist, Valdo Obruchev. Bond eventually accepts Leiter's request and follows his leads about the scientist's whereabouts to Cuba, where he infiltrates a Spectre gathering. Obruchev realises that it is a trap set by Blofeld to kill Bond with a deadly nanoscale weapon, but he is working for someone else and has re-engineered the weapon to attack only the members of Spectre. When Bond brings Obruchev to Leiter, Ash betrays them and helps Obruchev escape, killing Leiter. Bond returns to MI6 and confronts M regarding the development of the weapon, known as "Heracles", a nanobot that can be programmed to attack specific people based on their genetic markers. He then visits Blofeld in prison and is reacquainted with Madeleine Swann. Swann decides to leave before Blofeld arrives, while Bond has an altercation with Blofeld, who dies soon after. It is revealed that when he touched Swann, Bond was infected with Heracles nanobots that were programmed to kill Blofeld.

Bond traces Swann back to her childhood home where she is living with her five-year-old daughter, Mathilde. She tells Bond about Lyutsifer Safin, the man who controls Heracles. After Bond avenges Leiter's death by killing Ash, Safin captures Swann and Mathilde and brings them to his island, which is the Heracles factory. Bond works with MI6 to rescue Swann and Mathilde and destroy Safin's factory with a missile strike launched from a nearby Royal Navy destroyer. Before Bond kills him, Safin infects Bond with nanobots that have been programmed to attack Swann and Mathilde. Because of this, Bond decides to sacrifice himself to save them. After a tearful goodbye to Swann, who confirms that Mathilde is in fact his daughter, Bond is killed when the missiles obliterate the factory.

== Non-Eon films ==
The two Bond films from other production companies have a combined gross of over $200 million (or approximately $895 million in 2023 dollars)

Non-Eon films
Title	Year	Bond actor	Director(s)	Box office (millions)		Budget (millions)		Ref(s)
Title	Year	Bond actor	Director(s)	Actual $	Adjusted $ (2023)	Actual $	Adjusted $ (2023)	Ref(s)
Casino Royale	1967	David Niven	Ken Hughes; John Huston; Joseph McGrath; Robert Parrish; Val Guest; Richard Talmadge	41.7	381.0	12.0	110.0	
Never Say Never Again	1983	Sean Connery	Irvin Kershner	160.0	489.0	36.0	110.0	
Total of non-Eon films				204.4	895.0	48.0	220.0	

=== Casino Royale (1967) ===
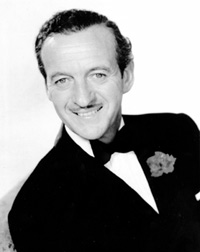
David Niven, in Casino Royale

Bond is brought out of retirement to deal with SMERSH and is promoted to the head of MI6 on the death of M. He recruits baccarat player Evelyn Tremble to beat SMERSH agent Le Chiffre. Having embezzled SMERSH's money, Le Chiffre is desperate for money to cover up his theft. Tremble stops Le Chiffre's cheating and beats him in a game of baccarat. Tremble is captured, tortured and killed. Bond establishes that the casino is located atop a giant underground headquarters run by the evil Dr. Noah; he and Moneypenny travel there to investigate. Dr. Noah turns out to be Sir James's nephew Jimmy Bond, who plans to use biological warfare to make all women beautiful and kill all tall men, leaving him as the "big man" who gets all the girls. The casino is then overrun by secret agents and a battle ensues, but the building explodes, killing all inside.

=== Never Say Never Again (1983) ===
Bond investigates the hijacking of two cruise missiles with live nuclear warheads which had been taken by SPECTRE. He meets Domino Petachi, the pilot's sister, and her lover, Maximillian Largo, SPECTRE's Number One, who reports directly to Blofeld. Following them to France, Bond informs Domino of her brother's death and subsequently finds his MI6 colleague killed by Fatima Blush, another SPECTRE agent: Bond kills her. Bond and Felix Leiter then attempt to board Largo's motor yacht, the Disco Volante (Flying Saucer), in search of the missing nuclear warheads. Bond becomes trapped and is taken, with Domino, to Palmyra, Largo's base of operations in North Africa, but Bond subsequently escapes with Domino. The two agents ambush Largo while he is placing one of the bombs.

== Critical and public reception ==
Eon films
Film	Critical		Public
Film	Rotten Tomatoes	Metacritic	CinemaScore
Dr. No	95% (63 reviews)	78 (8 reviews)	
From Russia with Love	97% (63 reviews)	83 (18 reviews)	
Goldfinger	99% (75 reviews)	87 (12 reviews)	
Thunderball	85% (54 reviews)	64 (9 reviews)	
You Only Live Twice	73% (52 reviews)	61 (14 reviews)	
On Her Majesty's Secret Service	81% (58 reviews)	61 (12 reviews)	
Diamonds Are Forever	64% (53 reviews)	59 (11 reviews)	
Live and Let Die	67% (54 reviews)	55 (9 reviews)	
The Man with the Golden Gun	40% (52 reviews)	43 (11 reviews)	
The Spy Who Loved Me	82% (60 reviews)	55 (12 reviews)	
Moonraker	59% (56 reviews)	66 (13 reviews)	
For Your Eyes Only	69% (55 reviews)	54 (12 reviews)	
Octopussy	41% (49 reviews)	63 (14 reviews)	
A View to a Kill	36% (61 reviews)	40 (20 reviews)	
The Living Daylights	75% (59 reviews)	60 (18 reviews)	A
Licence to Kill	79% (63 reviews)	58 (25 reviews)	B+
GoldenEye	81% (88 reviews)	65 (19 reviews)	A−
Tomorrow Never Dies	58% (92 reviews)	52 (38 reviews)	A−
The World Is Not Enough	51% (148 reviews)	57 (38 reviews)	B+
Die Another Day	55% (226 reviews)	56 (43 reviews)	A−
Casino Royale (2006)	94% (266 reviews)	80 (46 reviews)	A−
Quantum of Solace	63% (298 reviews)	58 (48 reviews)	B−
Skyfall	92% (390 reviews)	81 (49 reviews)	A
Spectre	63% (372 reviews)	60 (48 reviews)	A–
No Time to Die	83% (428 reviews)	68 (66 reviews)	A–

Non-Eon films
Film	Critical	
Film	Rotten Tomatoes	Metacritic
Casino Royale (1967)	26% (42 reviews)	48 (11 reviews)
Never Say Never Again	71% (55 reviews)	68 (15 reviews)

== Awards ==
In their sixty-year history, the Bond films have been nominated for and won many awards, including British Academy Film Awards, Golden Globe Awards and Academy Awards. In 1982, series originator Albert R. Broccoli also received the Irving G. Thalberg Memorial Award.

Eon films
Film	Awards
Dr. No	Winner, Golden Globe Award for New Star of the Year – Actress at the 21st Golden Globe Awards
From Russia with Love	Winner, BAFTA Award for British Cinematography: Colour at the 17th British Academy Film Awards; Nominated, Golden Globe Award for Best Original Song at the 22nd Golden Globe Awards
Goldfinger	Winner, Academy Award for Best Sound Effects at the 37th Academy Awards; Nominated, BAFTA Award for Best British Art Direction: Colour at the 18th British Academy Film Awards
Thunderball	Winner, Academy Award for Best Visual Effects at the 38th Academy Awards; Nominated, BAFTA Award for Best British Art Direction: Colour at the 19th British Academy Film Awards
You Only Live Twice	Nominated, BAFTA Award for Best British Art Direction: Colour at the 21st British Academy Film Awards
On Her Majesty's Secret Service	Nominated, Golden Globe Award for New Star of the Year – Actor at the 27th Golden Globe Awards
Diamonds Are Forever	Nominated, Academy Award for Best Sound at the 44th Academy Awards
Live and Let Die	Nominated, Academy Award for Best Original Song at the 46th Academy Awards
The Man with the Golden Gun	
The Spy Who Loved Me	Nominated, Academy Awards for Best Original Score, Best Original Song and Best Art Direction at the 50th Academy Awards; Nominated, BAFTA Award for Best Production Design at the 31st British Academy Film Awards; Nominated, Anthony Asquith Award at the 31st British Academy Film Awards; Nominated, Golden Globe Award for Best Original Song at the 35th Golden Globe Awards; Nominated, Golden Globe Award for Best Original Score at the 35th Golden Globe Awards
Moonraker	Nominated, Academy Award for Best Visual Effects at the 52nd Academy Awards
For Your Eyes Only	Nominated, Academy Award for Best Original Song at the 54th Academy Awards; Nominated, Golden Globe Award for Best Original Song at the 39th Golden Globe Awards
Octopussy	
A View to a Kill	Nominated, Golden Globe Award for Best Original Song at the 43rd Golden Globe Awards
The Living Daylights	
Licence to Kill	
GoldenEye	Nominated, BAFTA Award for Best Sound at the 49th British Academy Film Awards; Nominated, BAFTA Award for Best Special Visual Effects at the 49th British Academy Film Awards
Tomorrow Never Dies	Nominated, Golden Globe Award for Best Original Song at the 55th Golden Globe Awards
The World Is Not Enough	
Die Another Day	Nominated, Golden Globe Award for Best Original Song at the 60th Golden Globe Awards
Casino Royale (2006)	Winner, BAFTA Award for Best Sound at the 60th British Academy Film Awards; Nominated, Alexander Korda Award for Best British Film at the 60th British Academy Film Awards; Nominated, BAFTA Award for Best Actor in a Leading Role at the 60th British Academy Film Awards; Nominated, BAFTA Award for Best Special Visual Effects at the 60th British Academy Film Awards; Nominated, BAFTA Award for Best Adapted Screenplay at the 60th British Academy Film Awards; Nominated, BAFTA Award for Best Production Design at the 60th British Academy Film Awards; Nominated, BAFTA Award for Best Editing at the 60th British Academy Film Awards; Nominated, BAFTA Award for Best Cinematography at the 60th British Academy Film Awards; Nominated, Anthony Asquith Award for achievement in Film Music at the 60th British Academy Film Awards
Quantum of Solace	Nominated, BAFTA Award for Best Sound at the 62nd British Academy Film Awards; Nominated, BAFTA Award for Best Special Visual Effects at the 62nd British Academy Film Awards
Skyfall	Winner, Academy Award for Best Sound Editing at the 85th Academy Awards; Winner, Academy Award for Best Original Song at the 85th Academy Awards; Winner, Best Cinematography Award at the Los Angeles Film Critics Association awards Winner, Golden Globe Award for Best Original Song at the 70th Golden Globe Awards; Winner, BAFTA Award for Outstanding British Film at the 66th British Academy Film Awards; Winner, BAFTA Award for Best Film Music at the 66th British Academy Film Awards; Nominated, Academy Award for Best Sound Mixing at the 85th Academy Awards; Nominated, Academy Award for Best Cinematography at the 85th Academy Awards; Nominated, Academy Award for Best Original Score at the 85th Academy Awards
Spectre	Winner, Academy Award for Best Original Song at the 88th Academy Awards; Winner, Golden Globe Award for Best Original Song at the 73rd Golden Globe Awards
No Time to Die	Winner, Academy Award for Best Original Song at the 94th Academy Awards; Winner, Golden Globe Award for Best Original Song at the 79th Golden Globe Awards; Nominated, Academy Award for Best Sound at the 94th Academy Awards; Nominated, Academy Award for Best Visual Effects at the 94th Academy Awards

Non-Eon films
Film	Awards
Casino Royale (1967)	Nominated, Academy Award for Best Original Song at the 40th Academy Awards; Nominated, BAFTA Award for Best British Costume Direction: Colour at the 21st British Academy Film Awards
Never Say Never Again	Nominated, Golden Globe Award for Best Supporting Actress – Motion Picture at the 41st Golden Globe Awards

== See also ==
- Bond girl – Female love interest or sidekick of James Bond
- "Casino Royale" (Climax!) – The first live-action adaptation of an Ian Fleming novel
- James Bond music
- List of James Bond villains
- Outline of James Bond

== Sources ==
- Balio, Tino (1987). United Artists: The Company That Changed the Film Industry. Madison: University of Wisconsin Press. ISBN 978-0-299-11440-4.
- Block, Alex Ben; Autrey Wilson, Lucy (2010). George Lucas's Blockbusting: A Decade-by-Decade Survey of Timeless Movies Including Untold Secrets of Their Financial and Cultural Success. London: HarperCollins. ISBN 978-0-06-177889-6.
- Chapman, James (2009). Licence To Thrill: A Cultural History of the James Bond Films. London: I.B. Tauris. ISBN 978-1-84511-515-9.
- Cork, John; Scivally, Bruce (2002). James Bond: The Legacy. London: Boxtree. ISBN 978-0-7522-6498-1.
- Munden, Kenneth White (1997) [1976]. The American Film Institute Catalog of Motion Pictures Produced in the United States, Part 2. Berkeley and Los Angeles, California: University of California Press. ISBN 978-0-5202-0970-1.
