= Joseph Wiseman =

American actor (1918–2009)

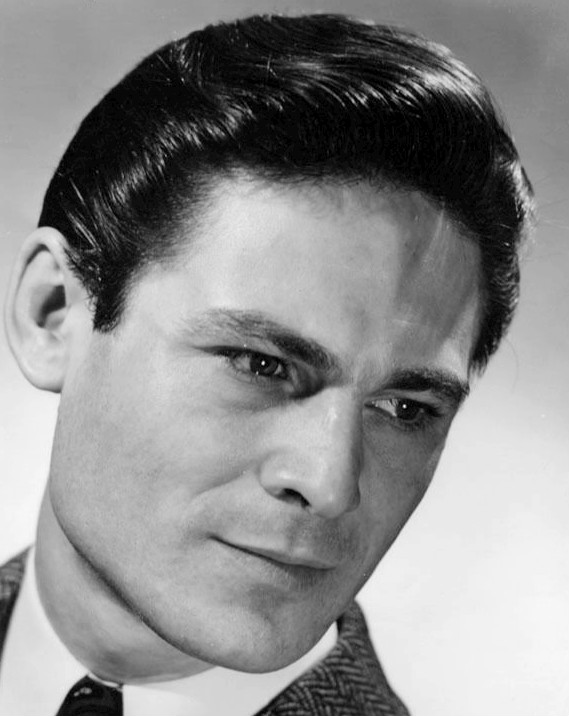
- Wiseman in 1950
- Born: May 15, 1918; Montreal, Quebec, Canada
- Died: October 19, 2009 (aged 91); New York City, U.S.
- Occupation: Actor
- Years active: 1950–2001
- Spouse(s): Nell Kinard (m. 1943; div. 1964) Pearl Lang (m. 1964; died 2009)
- Children: 1

Joseph Wiseman (May 15, 1918 – October 19, 2009) was a Canadian-born American actor of stage and screen. He starred as the villain Julius No in the first James Bond film, Dr. No, in 1962. He was also known for his role as crime boss Manny Weisbord on the television series Crime Story and his lengthy career on Broadway, where he was once called "the spookiest actor in the American theatre".

== Early life ==
Wiseman was born in Montreal, Quebec, to Jewish parents Louis and Pearl Wiseman. His family moved to New York City when he was young, and he was raised in Queens. He was an alumnus of John Adams High School and graduated June 1935, as was his future Dr. No co-star, Jack Lord.

At age 16, Wiseman began performing in summer stock and became professional, which displeased his parents.

== Career ==
Wiseman made his Broadway debut in 1938, playing a small part in Robert E. Sherwood's Abe Lincoln in Illinois. Among the many productions he appeared in live theatre were the title role in In the Matter of J. Robert Oppenheimer on Broadway in 1968, and the role of Father Massieu in the original Broadway production of Joan of Lorraine, the Maxwell Anderson play which eventually became the film Joan of Arc.

Wiseman appeared in several films in the 1950s. He made his first major film appearance in 1951's Detective Story, where he recreated his performance from Broadway as an unstable small-time hood. Soon after, he played Marlon Brando's archenemy in Viva Zapata! (1952). Wiseman's role as the titular Dr. No in the first James Bond film by Eon Productions was a decision of producer Harry Saltzman, who cast Wiseman in the role in December 1961. It was Wiseman's performance in Detective Story that gained him the part. (Later in his life, he viewed the film with disdain, and preferred to be remembered for his theater career.)

In 1967, he was cast as Billy Minsky's father in The Night They Raided Minsky's; later he appeared opposite Sir Laurence Olivier in The Betsy (1978). Wiseman had roles in a wide variety of other films: The Apprenticeship of Duddy Kravitz, Seize the Day, Bye Bye Braverman. In addition to being a regular on the series Crime Story, he had guest-starring and cameo roles in TV series including The Westerner; The Streets of San Francisco; The Untouchables; The Twilight Zone ("One More Pallbearer"); Magnum, P.I.; Buck Rogers in the 25th Century; and Night Gallery. His last film was released in 1988, though he appeared in TV shows such as MacGyver, L.A. Law, and Law & Order after that time. Wiseman's last appearance on television was the supporting role of Seymour Bergreen on a 1996 episode of Law & Order titled "Family Business". His last Broadway appearance was in Judgment at Nuremberg in 2001.

Following the death of Charles Gray in 2000, Wiseman was the last surviving main villain of the James Bond films that Sean Connery made for United Artists.

== Personal life and death ==
Wiseman married Nell Kinard on August 25, 1943, in New York, but they eventually divorced May 15, 1964, in Durham, NC. He was married to dancer, teacher and choreographer Pearl Lang from 1964 until her death in February 2009. He had a daughter with Kinard, Martha Graham Wiseman. Wiseman died on October 19, 2009, only 8 months after the death of his wife.

== Filmography ==
=== Film ===
- With These Hands (1950) as Mike Deleo
- Detective Story (1951) as Charley Gennini
- Viva Zapata! (1952) as Fernando Aguirre
- Les Misérables (1952) as Genflou
- Champ for a Day (1953) as Dominic Guido
- The Silver Chalice (1954) as Mijamin
- The Prodigal (1955) as Carmish
- Three Brave Men (1956) as Jim Barron
- The Garment Jungle (1957) as George Kovan
- The Unforgiven (1960) as Abe Kelsey
- The Happy Thieves (1961) as Jean Marie Calbert
- Dr. No (1962) as Dr. Julius No
- Bye Bye Braverman (1968) as Felix Ottensteen
- The Counterfeit Killer (1968) as Rajeski
- The Night They Raided Minsky's (1968) as Louis Minsky
- Stiletto (1969) as Emilio Matteo
- The Mask of Sheba (1970) as Bondelok
- Lawman (1971) as Lucas
- The Valachi Papers (1972) as Salvatore Maranzano
- Pursuit (1972) as Dr. Nordmann
- The Apprenticeship of Duddy Kravitz (1974) as Benjy Kravitz
- Journey into Fear (1975) as Col. Haki
- Murder at the World Series (1977) as Sam Druckman
- The Betsy (1978) as Jake Weinstein
- Buck Rogers in the 25th Century (1979) as Draco
- Jaguar Lives! (1979) as Ben Ashir
- Masada (1981) as Jerahmeel
- Seize the Day (1986) as Dr. Adler

=== Television ===
- The Untouchables: Episode: "The Antidote" (1961) as Russell Shield
- The Untouchables: Episode: "The Tommy Karpeles Story" (1961) as Albert Maris
- The Twilight Zone: Episode: "One More Pallbearer" (1962) as Paul Radin
- Wagon Train: Episode: "The Santiago Quesada Story" (1964) as Jim Case
- Pursuit (1972 ABC Movie of the Week) as Dr. Peter Nordmann
- Men of the Dragon (1974 ABC Movie of the Week) as Balashev
- QB VII (1974, Mini-series) as Morris Cady
- Zalmen or the Madness of God (1975, Broadway Theatre Archive) as Rabbi
- Greatest American Hero: Episode: "Don't Mess Around with Jim" (1981) as James J. Beck
- Magnum, P.I.: Episode: "Birdman of Budapest" (1983) as Dr. Albert Tessa
- A-Team: Episode: "The Bells of St. Mary's" (1984) as Zeke Westerland
- The Equalizer: Episode: "The Confirmation Day" (1985) as Eddie Vanessi
- Crime Story (1988) as Manny Weisbord
- MacGyver: Episode: "The Battle of Tommy Giordano" (1989) as Joe Catano
- L.A. Law: Episode: "Finish Line" (S8.E22) (1994) as Isidore Schoen
- Law & Order: Episode: "Family Business" (S7.E8) (1996) as Seymour Bergreen (final appearance)
