= Julius No =

Fictional villain in the 1958 James Bond novel and 1962 film Dr. No

Dr. Julius No
- James Bond character
- Joseph Wiseman as Dr. No
- First appearance: Dr. No (1958 novel)
- Last appearance: GoldenEye 007 (2010 video game)
- Created by: Ian Fleming
- Portrayed by: Joseph Wiseman
- Voiced by: Julian Holloway (James Bond Jr.); Carlos Alazraqui (GoldenEye: Rogue Agent)

In-universe information
- Gender: Male
- Affiliation: 義卜: Soviet Union (novel); SPECTRE (film); SCUM (James Bond Jr.); The Raven Triad (James Bond Jr); Independent/OCTOPUS (video games)
- Nationality: Chinese
- Classification: Villain
- Henchmen: Miss Taro; Miss Chung; Sister Rose; May
- Allies: Ernst Stavro Blofeld

Dr. Julius No is a fictional character and the main, eponymous antagonist of the 1958 James Bond spy novel Dr. No by Ian Fleming as well as its 1962 film adaptation; the first film in the James Bond film franchise. Dr. No is a Chinese-German mad scientist with distinctive metal hands. He is portrayed by Joseph Wiseman in the 1962 film and various others in later animated and interactive James Bond media.

== Novel biography ==
The 1958 novel Dr. No explains that Dr. Julius No was born in Peking to a German Methodist missionary and a Chinese girl, but was raised by his aunt. As an adult, he went to Shanghai, where he was involved with the Tongs, Chinese crime syndicates. Later he was smuggled to the United States and settled in New York City, where he became a clerk and eventually Treasurer for a Tong in the United States, called the "Hip-Sings".

In the late 1920s, a mob war broke out in New York, forcing the police to crack down on them. No stole one million dollars in gold from the Tongs and disappeared. But the Tongs tracked him down and tortured him to find the location of the gold. When No refused to tell them, the Tongs cut off his hands, shot him through the left side of the chest and left him for dead. No survived, due to a condition called dextrocardia, in which his heart is on the right side of the body.

No spent a long time in hospital, then enrolled in medical school in Milwaukee, Wisconsin. He adopted the title of Doctor and changed his name to Julius No, symbolic of his rejection of his father, whose given name was Julius. As in the film, No fits himself with metal manual prostheses, but the book describes them as simple pincers. In physical appearance, Dr. No is tall and very thin. He is described as being at least 6 inches taller than Bond, who is six feet tall, meaning that he's probably around 6 ft 6 inches (198 cm) in height. His head is said to be shaped like a "reverse oil drop", due to his round head, pointed chin and the yellowish tinge of his skin. He also mentions that while in school, he did not make use of his metal hands, replacing them with waxen ones which were less useful but gave himself a more human appearance. In the novel he wears a gunmetal coloured kimono; due to his inability to hold a bell, he uses a walkie-talkie which he carries around his neck. He also wears one of the first ever pair of contact lenses, and has had a lip slice cosmetic surgery, as well as wearing stacked-heel shoes in order to make himself taller. All of these factors were employed by No to conceal his identity from the Tongs.

With the million dollars from the Tong, he purchases rare stamps in order to preserve his money against inflation; he later purchases the island of Crab Key, off the coast of Jamaica, where he restarts a defunct guano business as a cover for his criminal operations. He employs Jamaican and Cuban laborers for his guano business, which is a mixed blessing for them. The workers are brutally supervised by Jamaican "Chigroes" (a portmanteau of "Chinese" and "Negroes", referring to their mixed ancestry), however they are paid good wages and given decent accommodations. No one who comes to the island is allowed to leave.

No, with aid from the Soviets, sabotages the nearby tests of American missiles by jamming their signals and making them land and explode on a different target than that planned. This forces the Americans to spend time and money redesigning their missiles. He also recovers unexploded missiles from the ocean and turns them over to the Russians. No also admits there is more at play than the shopworn East-West rivalry; his intent is to create enmity between the USSR and USA in an attempt to make the Cold War hot. This was further revealed in Ernst Stavro Blofeld's master plan using the "three fighting fish" as an analogy; when the Cold War ended, SPECTRE would then engage in sabotage and subversion against the victor, now weakened from the war.

James Bond does not actually learn of No's plot until he and Quarrel—with Honeychile Rider, who would trespass to find shells—had infiltrated Crab Key and been captured. Bond had gone there after Commander Strangways had disappeared, murdered by No's henchmen. Bond eventually kills No by suffocating him in a mound of guano.

=== Henchmen in the novel ===
- Miss Taro
- Annabel Chung
- Sister Rose
- May
- Riker
- Other various "Chigroes"
- The Three Blind Mice

== Film biography ==
In the 1962 film Dr. No, Dr. No (Joseph Wiseman) is a brilliant scientist with an implied Napoleon complex, and an example of the mad scientist trope. He is a self-described "unwanted child of a German missionary and a Chinese girl of a good family". He later "became treasurer of the most powerful criminal society in China"; in this case, the Tongs. He then "escaped to America with $10,000,000" of Tong gold bullion. He specialized in radiation, which cost him both of his hands; they were replaced with crude bionic metal ones. No's hands have great strength (he can crush a metal figurine with them) but are lacking in manual dexterity which leads to his demise.

He offered his skills and expertise to the Americans, and then the Soviets, but was rejected by both superpowers. To get revenge, No joined the criminal organization SPECTRE and relocated to his island of Crab Key in Jamaica.

When James Bond (Sean Connery) is sent to investigate the murder of two British agents John Strangways (Timothy Moxon) and Mary Trueblood (Dolores Keator) and any possible connection with recent rocket disasters, No orders several attempts on 007's life. He is particularly displeased with henchman Professor R.J. Dent (Anthony Dawson)'s failures, such as through the chauffeur Jones (Reginald Carter). He gives Dent a venomous spider, which is released in Bond's room whilst he sleeps; however, Bond wakes up, kills it, and lures Dent to Pleydell-Smith's corrupt secretary Miss Taro (Zena Marshall)'s private house, where Dent is interrogated and then shot twice by Bond.

No fails in his own attempts to kill Bond; first, inadvertently, by locking him in a ventilation shaft, which is variously heated and filled with water; and then, deliberately, by beating him with his metal hands.

No captures Bond and Honey Ryder (Ursula Andress) when they trespass on his island, and they are put through a decontamination shower since No's henchmen detected radiation on them. Inviting them to dinner at his private apartment, he offers Bond a position in his organization, but Bond refuses. Bond escapes through a ventilation shaft (and avoiding the obstacles of heat and flooding), and disguises himself with a radiation suit. Bond enters the control area where No and his assistants are preparing to disrupt the launch of an American rocket. Bond sabotages No's swimming pool reactor, allowing the American missile to launch successfully while No and most of his henchmen do not understand it. When No observes Bond's sabotage, the two men fight while the other personnel flee the imminent explosion. They fall onto a small platform that slowly descends into the boiling coolant of the overheating reactor. Bond manages to climb out, but No cannot get a grip on the metal framework, due to his metal hands, and is slowly boiled to death. Bond frees Honey from where she has been chained in a room filling with water, and escapes before the reactor explodes.

SPECTRE learned of the death of Dr. No and they vowed revenge on James Bond, which led to the events in From Russia with Love. This also set up the recurring battles of James Bond with SPECTRE in the future films.

=== Henchmen in the film ===
- Miss Taro (Zena Marshall) – arrested
- Professor R.J. Dent – shot by Bond
- Annabel Chung (Marguerite LeWars)
- Mr. Jones – poisoned himself with a cyanide laced cigarette
- The Three Blind Mice (Eric Coverley, Charles Edghill & Henry Lopez) – Explosion in car falling off cliff
- Sister Rose (Michel Mok)
- Sister Lily (Yvonne Shima)
- Jamaican guards

== Other appearances ==
Dr. No as seen in the James Bond Jr. animated series.

In the Daily Express James Bond comic-strip series by Yaroslav Horak and Jim Lawrence, Dr. No reappears in the story-line Hot-Shot, published between January 16, 1976 - June 1, 1976. In it, Dr. No had survived his previous encounter with James Bond and has remerged as a wealthy Indian businessman named Mr. Huliraya, who serves as the main antagonist of the story.

Dr. No (voiced by Julian Holloway) made several appearances in the 1991 animated series James Bond Jr.. He is depicted with bright green skin, similar to the Mandarin in Iron Man. This change was made due to a mandate against including too many ethnic characters as villains.)

Julius No also appeared in the video game GoldenEye: Rogue Agent, voiced by Carlos Alazraqui. Despite his death in both the book and film, he appears alongside fellow enemies Ernst Stavro Blofeld (Gideon Emery), Auric Goldfinger (Enn Reitel), Francisco Scaramanga (Christopher Lee) and Xenia Onatopp (Jenya Lano). In the game, Xenia Onatopp works for No and he seems to possess a considerable army of well-equipped henchmen as well as numerous tanks and helicopter gunships that resemble V-22 Ospreys. He also seems to have soldiers placed on countless rooftops and buildings in Hong Kong. He is electrocuted by his own reactor in a fight with the rogue 00 agent GoldenEye.

Julius No is also a multiplayer character in the 2005 video game From Russia with Love and is a playable multiplayer character in the 2010 video game GoldenEye 007 for the Wii.

The character of Dr. No makes a brief appearance in a 2012 Heineken beer commercial to promote the release of the twenty-third Bond film, Skyfall.

=== Non-official James Bond media ===
In Myths for the Modern Age: Philip José Farmer's Wold Newton Universe (Win Scott Eckert, ed., MonkeyBrain Books, 2005), Win Scott Eckert contributes "Who's Going to Take Over the World When I'm Gone?" wherein he posits that No's mother was an agent of Fu Manchu named Madame de Medici, who was in turn the daughter of Fu Xi, from Sax Rohmer's novel The Golden Scorpion. Likewise in The League of Extraordinary Gentlemen: Black Dossier, No is stated as being a distant relative of Fu Manchu. Later in the book, it is revealed that Bond's mission to stop Dr. No was a fraud, an alibi for Bond to kill a British leader for the Americans — "There was No Doctor."

In the alternate history novel Dracula Cha Cha Cha, Dr. No and Live and Let Die villain Mr. Big are mentioned as being vampire elders killed and drained by the Diogenes Club agent Hamish Bond.

== Cultural references ==
During the 1981 Ontario general election Progressive Conservative Premier Bill Davis mocked the Liberal leader Dr. Stuart Smith and his critical attitude towards the government by calling him "Dr. No". "Dr. No" was also used as the nickname of Northern Irish unionist politician Ian Paisley, due to his long-standing opposition to making concessions to Northern Ireland's Catholic community and to Irish nationalism. Similarly, American Republican politician and physician Tom Coburn was also known as "Dr. No" for his frequent opposition to legislation in the United States Congress, particularly bills which would increase federal spending. This nickname was also given to Representative Ron Paul for voting similarly against many bills, as well as his background as a medical doctor. In South Africa, right wing MP Andries Treurnicht was also known as "Dr. No" due to his staunch rejection of liberalisation of apartheid.

Art critic Lawrence Alloway compared the pessimistic and gory writing of British art critic Robert Melville about artist Francis Bacon to the speech patterns of Dr. No in "Dr. No's Bacon", Art News and Review, 9 April 1960.

=== Parodies ===
- In a nod to this character, the master villain of the 1967 Bond spoof Casino Royale is named Dr. Noah (Woody Allen).
- Star Trek: Deep Space Nine features Captain Benjamin Sisko (Avery Brooks) as a parodic villain named Dr. Noah in the 1995 episode "Our Man Bashir".
- The television series Get Smart featured part Chinese villains named Dr. Yes (Donald Davis) with unusually long, sharp fingernails, at least one of which is lethally envenomed and The Claw (Leonard Strong) with a magnetic claw in place of one hand.
- Doctor Claw (voiced by Frank Welker and Don Francks) appears as the perennial villain in the Inspector Gadget series.
- Dr. No also has made appearances in Auckland University Students' Association election campaigns, as a face for the 'no confidence' vote.
- Lego Agents' main villain Dr. Inferno is a parody of Dr. No.
- The Austin Powers film series' main antagonist Dr. Evil (Mike Myers) is a parody of several Bond villains, including Julius No.
- The 1964 Flintstones episode "Dr. Sinister" features a character named Madame Yes (Jean Vander Pyl), a parody of Dr. No.
- In "Double-Oh Schnozmo", a 2010 season 7 episode of the animated series The Fairly OddParents, Schnozmo (Dana Carvey) must regain his brother Cosmo (Daran Norris)'s trust by "saving" him from the evil Dr. Maybe (Tara Strong).
- The main antagonist of the James Pond video game franchise is named Dr. Maybe.
- The main antagonist of the Operation Stealth video game (released as James Bond: The Stealth Affair in the United States) is named Dr. Why.
