= Rosa Klebb =

Fictional Character and James Bond villain

- James Bond character
- Lotte Lenya as Rosa Klebb
- First appearance: From Russia, with Love (1957 novel)
- Last appearance: From Russia with Love (1963 film)
- Created by: Ian Fleming
- Portrayed by: Lotte Lenya

In-universe information
- Gender: Female
- Affiliation: SMERSH (novel); Ex-SMERSH, defects to SPECTRE (film); KGB/OCTOPUS (video games)
- Nationality: Russian
- Classification: Villain

Colonel Rosa Klebb is a fictional character, the main antagonist in the James Bond 1957 novel and 1963 film From Russia with Love, in which she is played by Lotte Lenya. She was a Soviet counter-intelligence operative until being discharged and joining SPECTRE.

Klebb's name is a pun on the popular Soviet phrase for women's rights, khleb i rozy (Cyrillic: хлеб и розы), which in turn was a direct Russian translation of the internationally used labour union slogan "bread and roses".

In the novel, Klebb is a veteran of Spanish Civil War, where she served as an infiltrator in the ranks of the Workers' Party of Marxist Unification (POUM). She was rumoured to be both the mistress of Andreu Nin i Perez and the assassin who killed him. In the present of the novel, she is in her late 40s when tasked by her superior to get revenge on James Bond for his involvement in the deaths of three SMERSH operatives. After questioning one of her allies, Bond confronts Klebb in Paris. She successfully poisons Bond with a toxin-laced blade, but she is captured by Bond's friend René Mathis. The following novel depicts Bond's recovery from the toxin, but mentions that Klebb died in the intervening time between the novels. The circumstances of her death are not explained. Klebb and Pussy Galore have been described as the "two memorable lesbians" from Ian Fleming's Bond novels, but Klebb is depicted as a typical butch.

== Novel biography ==
In the 1957 novel From Russia, with Love, Colonel Rosa Klebb is a high-ranking member of the feared Russian counter-intelligence agency SMERSH, where she serves as the supervisor of Department II (operations and executions). It is strongly implied in the novel that she is a lesbian; Ian Fleming believed the description of Klebb's sexual orientation allowed the reader to understand how she fits into the plot. She has a reputation for overseeing the interrogations of enemy agents in which, after torturing the target, she speaks to them in a warm and motherly tone to extract information. She started her career as an OGPU agent placed inside POUM during the Spanish Civil War. Her chief was Andreu Nin i Perez, whose mistress she supposedly was. It was later rumoured that it was she who killed him. She is 5 ft 4 in (1.63 m) tall and described as unattractive. She is in her late 40s.

Klebb is assigned by SMERSH leader General Nicholai Grubozaboyschikov to spearhead an operation to get revenge on James Bond for his involvement in the deaths of three SMERSH operatives, Le Chiffre, Mr. Big and Hugo Drax. Teaming with Tov Kronsteen and Red Grant, Klebb sets a trap for Bond, enlisting a cipher clerk, Tatiana Romanova, to pretend to defect, claiming to fall in love with Bond. Once Bond takes the bait, Grant intends to kill him. This plan backfires, however, when Bond foils Grant's attempt to kill him, and with information given to him by the now deceased Grant, Bond heads to Paris to confront Klebb.

Bond tracks Klebb to the hotel in Paris where she was to rendezvous with Grant at the conclusion of his mission. He finds her there dressed as a wealthy widow. After failing to kill him with a gun hidden in a telephone, she successfully poisons him by means of a fugu toxin-laced blade hidden in her shoe; she is then captured by Bond's friend René Mathis, of the Deuxième Bureau. The novel ends when Bond collapses to the floor; Fleming had intended to end the series at that point with Bond's death. In the next novel, Dr. No, M reveals that Bond survived as a result of Mathis' timely intervention. He mentions that Klebb is dead, without providing any details.

== Film biography ==
Rosa Klebb's signature weapon

In the film, Rosa Klebb (Lotte Lenya) is depicted as the former SMERSH head who has defected to become a member of SPECTRE (Ernst Stavo Blofeld (Anthony Dawson) refers to her as "No. 3"). She uses Tov Kronsteen's (Vladek Sheybal) plans to obtain the Lektor, a decoding device that is of high value to MI6, and kill James Bond (Sean Connery). She manipulates Tatiana Romanova (Daniela Bianchi) into helping Bond steal the Lektor, and then sends Red Grant (Robert Shaw) to kill Bond and recover it. After Bond kills Grant and escapes to Venice with the Lektor, Blofeld confronts both Klebb and Kronsteen over who is responsible for the failure of the mission; Kronsteen is executed, whilst Klebb is given one last chance to get Bond and the Lektor. Posing as a hotel maid, Klebb attempts to take the Lektor; when she is caught, she points a .25 Beretta 418 pistol at Bond. Tatiana then distracts her, causing her to drop the Beretta, and Bond and Klebb fight. As in the novel, Klebb attempts to kick Bond with the poison-tipped shoe, but Bond blocks the attack with a chair. Tatiana then shoots Klebb with her own Beretta, killing her.

For the screen, Klebb's sexuality was made less obvious; a few hints remain throughout the film, such as her reaction to when SPECTRE henchman Morzeny (Walter Gotell) touches her arm at the SPECTRE Island training facility, and when she appraises Romanova's figure during their first meeting and touches her leg.

== Legacy ==
Along with Irma Bunt (Ilse Steppat) from On Her Majesty's Secret Service (1969), Rosa Klebb was an inspiration for the character of Frau Greta Farbissina (Mindy Sterling) from the Austin Powers series.

Rosa Klebb's shoe blade has been featured in other films. It is used by Jade Fox (Cheng Pei-pei) in Crouching Tiger, Hidden Dragon (2000), Ichi (Nao Ōmori) in Ichi the Killer (2001), James West (Will Smith) in Wild Wild West (1999), the Joker (Heath Ledger) in The Dark Knight (2008), Oleg Vasilyevich Orlov (Daniel Olbrychski) in Salt (2010) and Gary "Eggsy" Unwin (Taron Egerton) in Kingsman: The Secret Service (2014). It was also referenced in the 2012 Family Guy 10th season episode "Mr. and Mrs. Stewie" and parodied in the Peter Sellers film The Pink Panther Strikes Again (1976).

A pair of Rosa Klebb's shoes can also be seen in Q (John Cleese)'s underground headquarters in the 2002 Bond film Die Another Day, along with other historic gadgets from Bond films, marking the 40th anniversary of the series. It is also included in the video for Madonna's "Die Another Day", the title track of the film, in which two versions of Madonna fight and kill each other, and the "Good Madonna" uses her shoe blade to disarm the "Bad Madonna".

In the 2010 reimagining of the video game GoldenEye 007, the weapon that was named "Klobb" in the original game (originally named after designer Ken Lobb) has had its name changed to "Klebb". Klebb herself is also a playable character in the game's multiplayer component.

== Reception ==
Rosa Klebb was also included in a list of the top ten Bond villains by The Times in 2008. Lisa Funnell described her as one of "the most dangerous female villains of the decade".

Elisabeth Ladenson wrote that she is one of "two memorable lesbians" from Ian Fleming's Bond novels (the other being Pussy Galore). Ladenson notes that Klebb's character, a butch design which Ladenson describes as unattractive, can be seen as a "dig at Iron Curtain femininity, the sort of joke that endured until recently in digs at Eastern European female athletes". She also notes that her portrayal in the novel is more feminine than in the film. Lastly, using Melanie Klein's object relations theory, Ladenson suggests that Klebb's can be seen as the "bad mother" type of associative character.

Lauren Spungen criticized the portrayal of homosexuality in the characters of Klebb and Galore, arguing that the "battle between heterosexuality and homosexuality" is portrayed as a metaphor for the battle of "good and evil". Her unwanted advances towards Bond's love interest, Tatiana Romanova and other characterization make Klebb "foreign and not relatable, allowing further dehumanization".

Preceded by Julius No	James Bond Villain; From Russia with Love	Succeeded by Auric Goldfinger
