= Lotte Lenya =

Austrian singer and actress (1898–1981)

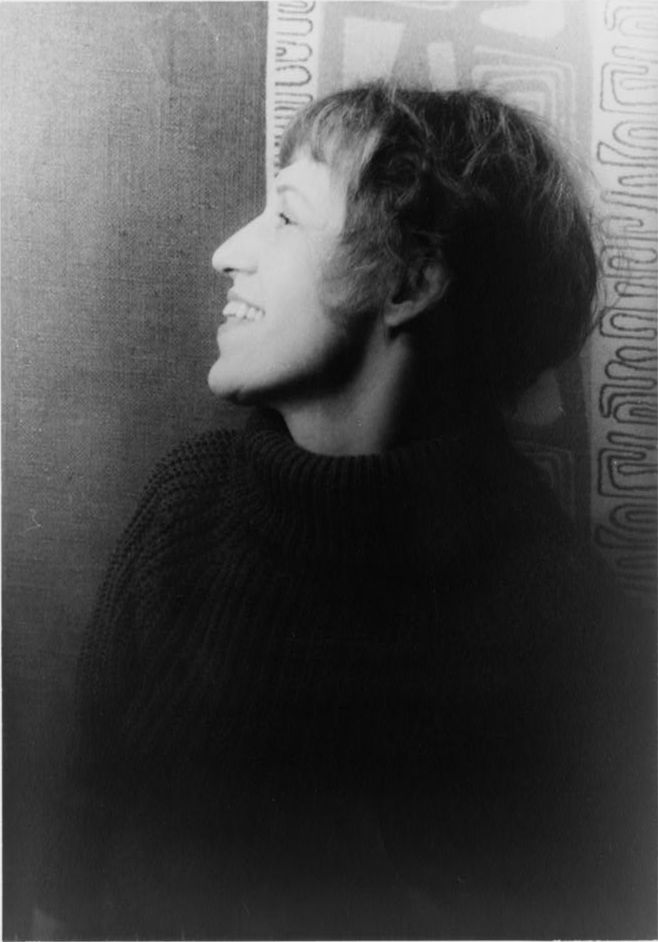
- 1962 photograph
- Born: Karoline Wilhelmine Charlotte Blamauer; 18 October 1898; Vienna, Austria-Hungary
- Died: 27 November 1981 (aged 83); New York City, U.S.
- Occupations: Actress; singer
- Years active: 1922–1980
- Spouses: Kurt Weill (m. 1926; div. 1933) (m. 1937; died 1950) George Davis (m. 1951; died 1957) Russell Detwiler (m. 1962; died 1969) Richard Siemanowski (m. 1971; sep. 1973)

Lotte Lenya (born Karoline Wilhelmine Charlotte Blamauer; 18 October 1898 – 27 November 1981) was an Austrian-American singer, diseuse, and actress, long based in the United States. In the German-speaking and classical music world, she is best remembered for her performances of the songs of her first husband, Kurt Weill. In English-language cinema, she was nominated for an Academy Award for her role as a jaded aristocrat in The Roman Spring of Mrs. Stone (1961). She also played the murderous and sadistic Rosa Klebb in the James Bond movie From Russia with Love (1963).

== Early career ==
In 1922, Lenya was seen by her future husband, German-Jewish composer Kurt Weill, during an audition for his first stage score Zaubernacht, but because of his position behind the piano, she did not see him. She was cast, but owing to her loyalty to her acting teacher, she declined the role. She accepted the part of Jenny in the first performance of The Threepenny Opera (Die Dreigroschenoper) in 1928, and the part became her breakthrough role. During the last years of the Weimar Republic, she was busy in film and theatre, and especially in Brecht-Weill plays. She made several recordings of Weill's songs. (Note: Recorded "Six Songs by Kurt Weill" (1943) for Bost Records (BA 8) in New York. In 1944, she recorded two of Weill's songs for the U.S. Office of War Information for use in radio broadcasts to Germany: "Wie lange noch" with lyrics by Walter Mehring and "Und was bekam des Soldaten Weib". Records "'The Threepenny Opera" (1954 New York cast) (Blitzstein adaptation) MGM Records (E3121) released in July 1954. Records "Lotte Lenya sings Kurt Weill" (1955) in Hamburg for Philips Records (B 07 039); released in the U.S. by Columbia Records (ML 5056) in November 1955 as "Lotte Lenya Sings Berlin Theater Songs of Kurt Weill". In 1956, records "Die sieben Todsünden"(The Seven Deadly Sins) for Philips Records (B 07 186) in Hamburg, conducted by Wilhelm Brückner-Rüggeberg; Columbia Records releases the recording in the United States (KL 5175) in March 1957. In 1956, she recorded "Aufstieg und Fall der Stadt Mahagonny" ("Rise and Fall of the City of Mahagonny") for Philips (L 09 418-20) and Columbia (K3L 243) in Hamburg, conducted by Wilhelm Brückner-Rüggeberg. In 1957, records "September Song and Other American Theatre Songs of Kurt Weill" for Columbia (KL 5229), conducted by Maurice Levine; it is released in February 1958. In 1958, records "Die Dreigroschenoper" ("The Threepenny Opera") for Philips (L 09 421-22) and Columbia (O2L 257), conducted by Wilhelm Brückner-Rüggeberg. In 1960 records "Happy End" for Philips (B 47 080 L) in Hamburg, conducted by Wilhelm Brückner-Rüggeberg. The Columbia (OL 5630) issue released in the U.S. in 1964.)

With the rise of Nazism in Germany, many artists were not appreciated, and although not Jewish, she left the country, having become estranged from Weill (they would later divorce and re-marry). In March 1933, she moved to Paris, where she sang the leading part in Brecht-Weill's "sung ballet", The Seven Deadly Sins.

Lenya and Weill settled in New York City on 10 September 1935. During the summer of 1936, Weill, Lenya, Paul Green, and Cheryl Crawford rented a house at 277 Trumbull Avenue in Nichols, Connecticut, about 2 miles (3.2 km) from Pine Brook Country Club, the summer rehearsal headquarters of the Group Theatre. Here, Green and Weill wrote the script and music for the controversial Broadway play Johnny Johnson, which was titled after the most frequently occurring name on the American casualty list of World War I. During this period, Lenya had a love affair with playwright Paul Green.

During World War II, Lenya did a number of stage performances, recordings, and radio performances, including for the Voice of America. After a badly received part in her husband's musical The Firebrand of Florence in 1945 in New York, she withdrew from the stage. After Weill's death in 1950, she was coaxed back to the stage. She appeared on Broadway in Barefoot in Athens and married editor George Davis.

== Late career ==
In 1956, she won a Tony Award for her role as Jenny in Marc Blitzstein's English version of The Threepenny Opera, the only time an off-Broadway performance has been so honored. Lenya went on to record a number of songs from her time in Berlin, as well as songs from the American stage. Her voice had deepened with age. When she was to sing the soprano parts in Rise and Fall of the City of Mahagonny and The Seven Deadly Sins, the music needed transposition to substantially lower keys.

Sprechstimme was used in some famous songs in the Brecht-Weill plays, but now Lenya used it even more to compensate for her vocal limitations. Lenya was aware of this as a problem; in other contexts, she was very careful about fully respecting her late husband's score.

She founded the Kurt Weill Foundation for Music, to administer incomes and issues regarding rights, and to spread knowledge about Weill's work. She was present in the studio when Louis Armstrong recorded Brecht-Weill's "Mack the Knife". Armstrong improvised the line "Look out for Miss Lotte Lenya!" and added her name to the list of Mack's female conquests in the song.

She narrated George Grosz' Interregnum, a film about the artist George Grosz that was nominated for an Academy Award for Best Documentary Short in 1960.

Her role as Vivien Leigh's earthy friend Contessa Magda Terribili-Gonzales in the screen version of Tennessee Williams' The Roman Spring of Mrs. Stone (1961) brought Lenya Academy Award and Golden Globe nominations as Best Supporting Actress. In 1963, she was cast as the SMERSH agent Rosa Klebb in the James Bond movie From Russia with Love starring Sean Connery and Robert Shaw.

In 1966, Lenya originated the role of Fräulein Schneider in the original Broadway cast of the musical Cabaret. Kander and Ebb's score was considered by some to be inspired by Weill's music. In 1979, two years before her death, Lotte Lenya was inducted into the American Theater Hall of Fame.

== Personal life ==
Lenya was born to Catholic working-class parents in Vienna. She went to Zürich to study in 1914, taking her first job at the Schauspielhaus, using the stage name Lotte Lenja. She moved to Berlin to seek work in 1921.

Lenya and Weill did not meet properly until 1924 through a mutual acquaintance, the writer Georg Kaiser. They married in 1926, and later divorced in 1933, only to reconcile in September 1935 after emigrating to the United States. They remarried in 1937. During and between their marriages, she had numerous lovers, including Max Ernst, Paul Green, and Tilly Losch. In 1941, the couple moved to a house of their own in New City, New York, roughly 50 km north of New York City. Their second marriage lasted until Weill's death in 1950.

Lenya's second husband (1951–57) was American editor George Davis, who was homosexual. After Davis' death in 1957, she married artist Russell Detwiler in 1962, who was homosexual as well. He was 26 years her junior and a heavy alcoholic, but she was widowed for a third time when Detwiler died at the age of 44 in 1969 as the result of a fall from an alcoholic seizure. He was interred on their seventh wedding anniversary. On June 9, 1971, she married critic and TV producer Richard Siemanowski, but separated from him only two years later, never having lived with him.

== Death ==
Lenya died in Manhattan of cancer in 1981, aged 83. She is buried next to Weill at Mount Repose Cemetery in Haverstraw, New York.

== Legacy ==
In 1956, Louis Armstrong recorded the song "Mack the Knife", both as a solo number and as a duet with Lenya. Armstrong added Lenya's name into the lyrics, in place of one of the characters in the play. Bobby Darin's 1959 hit recording of the song used these updated lyrics mentioning Lenya.

Frank O'Hara's posthumously published "To Lotte Lenya" is named after Lenya and features a line in German.

Donovan's 1968 song "Laléna" was inspired by Lenya.

The Michael Kunze play Lenya is about Brecht's favorite singer, Lotte Lenya.

In 2007, the musical LoveMusik, based on Lenya's relationship with Weill, opened on Broadway. Lenya was portrayed by Donna Murphy.

She is mentioned in the Fascinating Aïda song "Lieder", which originally described her as German, but was corrected for later performances. She is referenced in the Gavin Friday song "Dolls" from his 1995 album Shag Tobacco.

The Lotte Lenya Competition recognizes young singers and actors who are dramatically and musically convincing in repertoire ranging from opera and operetta to contemporary Broadway scores, with a focus on the works of Kurt Weill.

== Filmography ==
| Year | Title | Role | Notes |
|---|---|---|---|
| 1931 | The Threepenny Opera | Jenny Diver | |
| 1961 | The Roman Spring of Mrs. Stone | Contessa Magda Terribili-Gonzales | |
| 1963 | From Russia with Love | Rosa Klebb | |
| 1965 | Mutter Courage und ihre Kinder | Mother Courage | TV movie |
| 1966 | Ten Blocks on the Camino Real | The Gypsy | TV movie |
| 1969 | The Appointment | Emma Valadier | |
| 1977 | Semi-Tough | Clara Pelf | |
| 1980 | Mahagonny | | Voice, (final film role) |

Lenya can also be seen and heard singing the "Havana Song" from Rise and Fall of the City of Mahagonny and "Surabaya Johnny" from Happy End on Episode 6 of Aaron Copland's WNET series Music in the Twenties.

== See also ==
- List of German-speaking Academy Award winners and nominees
