= 007 First Light =

2026 action-adventure video game

- Developer: IO Interactive (Note: Additional work and development support by Delphi Interactive)
- Publisher: IO Interactive
- Directors: Hakan Abrak; Martin Emborg
- Producers: Markus Friedl; Céline Gil; Jack Bowman
- Programmer: David Cañadas
- Artist: Rasmus Poulsen
- Writer: Michael Vogt
- Composer: The Flight
- Series: James Bond
- Engine: Glacier
- Platforms: PlayStation 5; Windows; Xbox Series X/S; Nintendo Switch 2
- Release: PS5, Windows, Xbox Series X/S; 27 May 2026; Nintendo Switch 2; 18 March 2027
- Genre: Action-adventure
- Mode: Single-player

007 First Light is a 2026 action-adventure video game developed and published by IO Interactive. Based on the James Bond franchise, it tells an original narrative inspired by the novels and short stories by Ian Fleming, and the film series starring the character. The game depicts James Bond's origin story, as he embarks on his journey to earn his 00 status.

Following the critical and commercial failure of 007 Legends (2012), publisher Activision had its non-exclusive licence to produce James Bond video games revoked, resulting in an extended hiatus of video games adaptations. IO Interactive announced the development of a James Bond game in November 2020. The game entered full production at IO Interactive following the completion of Hitman 3 (2021), and was fully revealed in June 2025.

007 First Light was released for PlayStation 5, Windows, and Xbox Series X/S on 27 May 2026, with a Nintendo Switch 2 version releasing on 18 March 2027. The game received generally positive reviews from critics, with praise given to the gameplay, combat, writing, and Patrick Gibson's performance as Bond. It had sold 4 million units by August 2026.

== Gameplay ==
Bond can use the laser from his Q-Watch to stun enemies.

Players control James Bond as he goes through training and executes missions to become a fully-fledged MI6 agent. The game is played from a third-person perspective, with occasional quick-time events and cutscenes.

As Bond, players participate in operations to advance the story, culminating in him "earning the number". Players may choose to complete missions aggressively, fighting enemies and taking them down, or by using bluffs and environmental items to slip past enemies and talk their way out of trouble.

Bond is able to parry opponents' attacks and perform takedowns to neutralise them. While Bond is usually restricted to non-lethal means of combat when engaging enemies, he may be granted a "licence to kill" when enemies show the intent to kill him, permitting Bond to use lethal force, including the use of firearms.

007 First Light features an Omega Seamaster chronograph watch specially designed for the game, alongside the Aston Martin Valhalla sports car. Q's lab is responsible for supplying Bond's mission attire, weapons, equipment and vehicles. Bond's main tool on his missions is the Q Watch, a modified Omega Seamaster Diver 300M which can hack electronics, and he can bring other gadgets to use on his missions.

== Story ==
=== Setting and characters ===
007 First Light depicts an original narrative that draws inspiration from the novels and short stories by Ian Fleming and the film franchise featuring the character. Described as an origin story for the character, the game follows a young James Bond (Patrick Gibson), who is portrayed as a 26-year-old, inexperienced MI6 agent tasked with a mission that, when completed successfully, will grant him his 00 status.

The game features new iterations of Bond characters such as M (Priyanga Burford), (Note: Burford previously played an MI6 scientist in the Bond film No Time to Die (2021).) Q (Alastair Mackenzie), and Miss Moneypenny (Kiera Lester), re-imagined to reflect their roles in shaping Bond's early career. The game features original characters, such as Bond's reluctant MI6 mentor and former 00 agent John Greenway (Lennie James), Bond girl and thief Isola Vale (Noémie Nakai), psychology and game theory expert Selina Tan (Gemma Chan), flamboyant arms dealer Bawma (Lenny Kravitz), Bond's training colleagues Cressida Bright (Jessica Rhodes) and former SAS trooper Lennox Monroe (Chris O'Reilly), and Bond villains Sir Nicholas Webb (Anthony Howell), his son, Damien (Bart Edwards), and their personal assassins, the Murto Twins (Anssi Lindström).

=== Plot ===
A Special Air Service team is ambushed during a retrieval operation in Iceland, leaving Navy aircrewman James Bond the sole survivor. Guided by an MI6 handler, he reaches the target—a research camp studying a crashed satellite—finding it occupied by a mercenary group. Defying orders, Bond rescues the captive scientists and destroys the camp, preventing the asset from falling into enemy hands.

Bond is recruited by M, the head of MI6, to join the revitalised 00 program. Despite starting months behind the six other candidates, he passes the training under the strict regimen of his reluctant instructor, John Greenway. He grows close to his team, especially recruits Monroe and Cressida. A few months later, the team is tasked with apprehending Rhys Beckett, a rogue agent and former 009, at a hotel in Slovakia. Bond follows a suspicious staff member revealed to be one of two twin assassins, the Murtos, who fatally stab Monroe and set off a bomb that kills two other recruits and paralyses Cressida. Before Beckett escapes, Bond attaches a wristwatch to his plane, allowing MI6 to track him to Mauritania.

Bond and Greenway set off to capture Beckett but discover that he has been killed. They deduce that Beckett was the target of the bombing rather than the mastermind, but the proof is destroyed in a mercenary ambush. Despite Bond and Greenway suspecting a larger plot, M declares Beckett responsible for the bombing and closes the case. One of the Murto twins attacks Bond at home; Bond chases him to a gala hosted by AI pioneer Sir Nicholas Webb and kills him. He finds evidence incriminating Webb for the bombing in Slovakia and learns Greenway is also a target.

Bond is captured by Webb's son Damien and is rescued by Isola Vale, a professional thief he met while she was masquerading as a French agent in Slovakia. He reunites with Greenway, who has killed the assassins sent after him. The pair infiltrate Webb Industries' headquarters and, with Isola's help, learn that Webb's actions are cover-ups for mistakes committed by his quantum supercomputer, THEIA, which is being employed by MI6 to predict terrorist threats. THEIA's first mistake was falsely identifying Beckett and two other agents as moles, whom Greenway was sent to eliminate, with Webb having murdered Beckett to prevent him from exposing THEIA's flaws. Shocked by the revelation, Greenway goes off-grid.

Despite orders to bring both agents in on terrorism charges, M sends Bond to a luxury resort in Vietnam to gather evidence on Webb's duplicity and intercept Damien, who plans to conduct another cover-up by murdering geneticist Theresa Lorca. Bond saves Lorca and kills the other Murto twin but is captured by Damien in the process. After being freed by Greenway, Bond seemingly kills Damien by crushing him under pipes. Greenway, fatally wounded in the encounter, admits in his final moments that Bond is what MI6 needs and his heroic nature is what defines him.

Webb coerces M into granting him immunity by leaking vital MI6 information. Unwilling to accept such an outcome, Bond goes rogue and teams up with Isola to infiltrate Webb's facility in Antarctica, where he discovers Webb's scheme to supplant the British government with THEIA's sibling AI, HYPERION. Bond fights his way to HYPERION's core, but Isola fatally shoots Webb and steals the core for herself. Bond manages to stop Isola and destroy the core, and both are taken into MI6 custody. They are freed when mercenaries attack MI6 headquarters. While Isola flees, Bond heads to THEIA's chamber, finding Damien stealing THEIA's core. After dispatching the mercenaries with a customised Aston Martin Valhalla, Bond chases Damien into the sewers, disables his exo-suit, and throws himself and Damien into the reservoir below. Damien drowns while Bond is saved by Isola, who kisses him before making off with THEIA's core.

At Greenway's grave, M informs Bond that he has been cleared of all charges and formally inducts him into the "00" program. Designating himself 007 in honour of being the seventh recruit, Bond vows to track Isola down to recover the THEIA core and find out for whom she works.

== Development ==
007 First Light is the first major game featuring James Bond following a hiatus resulting from the critical and commercial failure of 007 Legends (2012), which saw publisher Activision having its non-exclusive licence to produce video games using the James Bond intellectual property (IP) revoked by Eon Productions and Metro-Goldwyn-Mayer in January 2013. The IP licensing agreement for IO Interactive's game was later brokered by Delphi Interactive with Danjaq, the holding company that owns Eon Productions, and Metro-Goldwyn-Mayer.

Hitman series developer IO Interactive met with Eon Productions to pitch their own vision for a James Bond video game as they were developing Hitman 3 (2021). According to company president Hakan Abrak, the studio was under the impression that "[Eon] were not looking for a game", having grown dissatisfied with the action-oriented style and gameplay of the latest console Bond games under Activision. Chief creative officer Christian Elverdam stated that a move away from relying on weapons to complete missions was an integral part of the studio's pitch to Eon, citing their work on Hitman as a game where violent solutions were actively discouraged, as an example of how Eon were convinced by IO Interactive that there was a "sophistication" in how the developers approached espionage gameplay. IO Interactive emphasised its interest in pursuing an original interpretation of James Bond, divorced from any of the prior literary and cinematic incarnations of the character, as they wished to apply a similar effort to creating their own narrative for an existing IP as they did for any of their original projects and characters. This includes the likeness of James Bond himself, which is not derived from any of the actors to portray him on film, a first for the character in a playable capacity since James Bond 007: Agent Under Fire (2001).

Elverdam was excited at the prospect of having a version of James Bond produced from the ground up for gaming, remarking on how it removed expectations that their version of the character would have to adhere to characteristics of pre-existing iterations while also being a take on the property "gamers can call their own". He additionally recalled a trip that the development team had made to Pinewood Studios during production of the film No Time to Die (2021), which instilled the "gravity" of taking on the Bond licence. According to Abrak, the idea of depicting James Bond's origin and efforts to claim his licence to kill, an event only definitively and briefly portrayed in the opening of the Daniel Craig film Casino Royale (2006), was enthusiastically received between IO Interactive and Eon, who were both receptive to the idea of a narrative that is "completely beginning and becoming a story" as opposed to directly adapting the plot of an existing Bond film. The game's art director, Rasmus Poulsen, stated that the team sought to avoid portraying certain aspects of the character that were deemed outdated, and in particular, attitudes towards women seen expressed by Bond in previous series entries that the developers believed would be perceived as sexist by modern audiences.

Production on 007 First Light began with a small team initially while most of IO Interactive were finishing work on Hitman 3 (2021) before scaling up. Development took place across IO Interactive's five studios in Copenhagen, Malmö, Istanbul, Barcelona and Brighton. 007 First Light was IO Interactive's most expensive title to develop with its budget before marketing at over $100 million. IO Interactive did not use generative AI in the development of 007 First Light. Art director Rasmus Poulsen said that a theme of Bond is often "beware of utopia" as the game's narrative deals with the intersection between artificial intelligence and its fallible role in decision-making for defence companies. IO Interactive sought to "reinforce the immersion" of Bond as a British spy by excising any Americanisms. In the game's State of Play demo from September 2025 showcasing the Slovakia section, Bond used the American English phrase "parking lot" which was changed to the British "car park" in the final game. On 13 May 2026, it was announced that 007 First Light had "gone gold" with principal development complete and the game sent to physical disc manufacturing.

IO Interactive added a proprietary volumetric smoke system to its Glacier engine for 007 First Light, which it claims "has not been done anywhere before". The game incorporates ray tracing and "fully dynamic" global illumination in its lighting model.

=== Gameplay development ===
IO Interactive took inspiration from the freeflow combat system in the Batman: Arkham series and the large action setpieces and destructible environments seen in the Uncharted series. In IO Interactive's Hitman: World of Assassination trilogy (2016–2021), combat was a last resort rather than the only viable option. The studio sought to design a combat system with 007 First Light that flows seamlessly into cinematic setpieces. IO Interactive still aimed to maintain the Hitman series' freedom of choice in gameplay but wanted to avoid creating a "reskin" of Hitman. 007 First Light emphasises greater forward momentum for the player's gameplay style whether that be in stealth or open combat compared to the slower, more deliberative, puzzle-like approach of Hitman where assassinations required setup. Unlike Hitman, "you're playing as a spy, not an assassin" according to IO Interactive which puts greater emphasis on infiltration, investigation and eavesdropping on clues.

007 First Light is the first IO Interactive title to include drivable vehicles. Art director Rasmus Poulsen described the inclusion of controllable vehicles as a "huge challenge" that the studio had to take on. The studio had to "bring onto the team specific driving expertise" in order to better incorporate such mechanics.

=== Character development ===
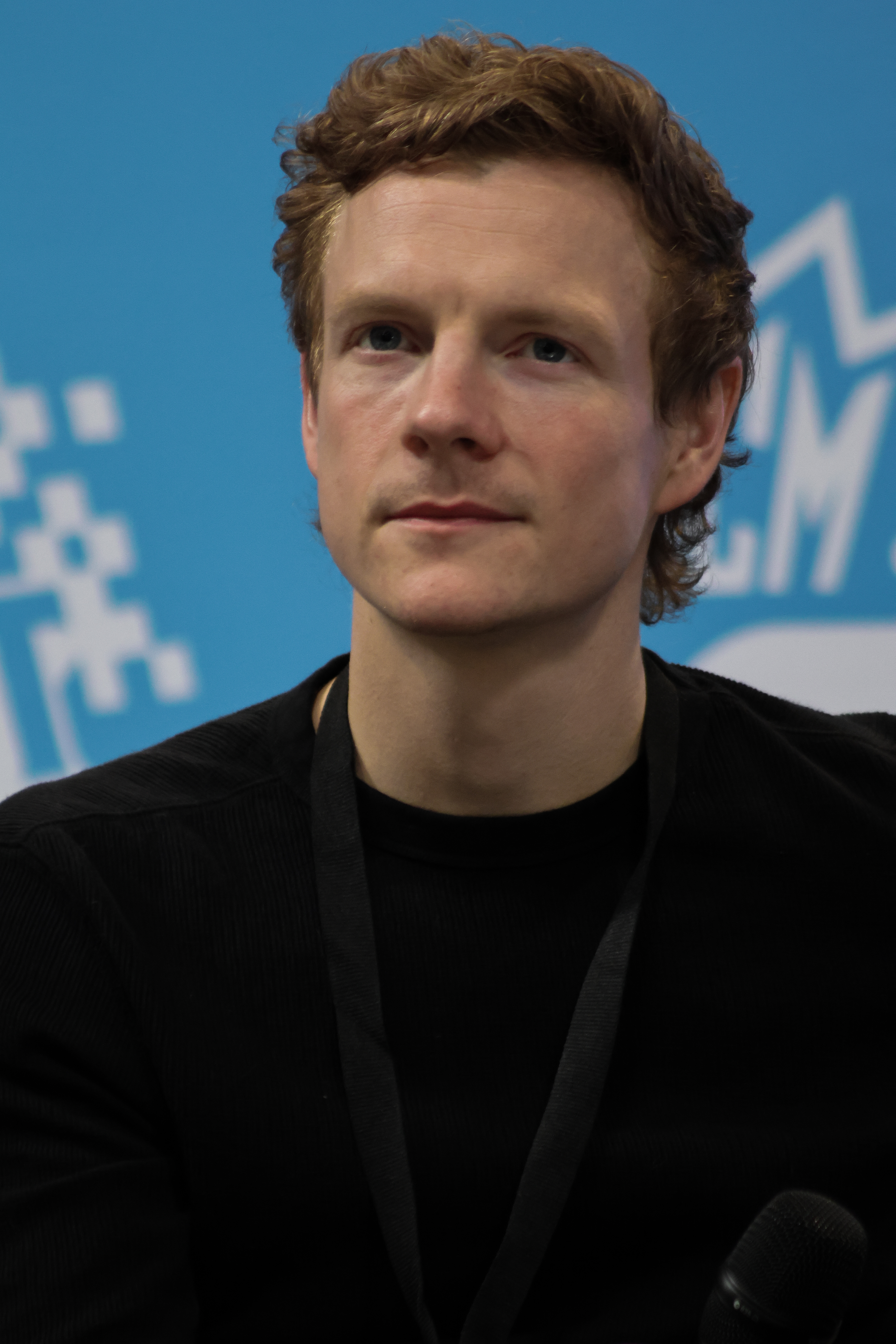
Patrick Gibson portrays a young James Bond in 007 First Light.

As no actor had been cast to succeed Daniel Craig as Bond for future films at the time of the game's development, (Note: Robert Pattinson was later announced in November 2026 as the next actor to portray Bond in film.) IO Interactive felt a sense of freedom in crafting their own version of Bond that did not have to be based on an existing Bond actor or to be a video game adaptation of the films. IO Interactive CEO Hakan Abrak said, "I don't think we would have necessarily had the same energy and the same vision and the same results if we were to do a gamification of a movie." 007 Legends included an adaptation of one film from every Bond actor and heavily incorporated elements from the films to coincide with the release of Skyfall (2012), while using Craig's likeness for Bond.

In creating its own version of Bond, IO Interactive sought to create something new and unique while still honouring the character's legacy. 007 First Light follows a 26-year-old Bond as a recruit in the MI6 training program. Irish actor Patrick Gibson was cast as Bond. Gibson said he was "pretty stunned" after learning he had been cast. Narrative and cinematic director Martin Emborg said that Gibson had a level of "built-in impatience" that was "perfect" for a young Bond. Emborg wanted the young Bond to exhibit "an unearned confidence" that he hoped players would read as a glaring naivety from "a reckless young man". Senior combat designer Tom Marcham wanted the game's combat to exhibit the character's "inner rage" from his childhood experiences as an orphan.

When developing the characters surrounding Bond, IO Interactive paid mind to how they influence Bond's personality and mannerisms as he grows into a skilled MI6 agent. Emborg said that they imbued surrounding characters like M and Moneypenny with "some of those qualities that you know from Bond, and so that they can inform the character". Moneypenny plays a more active role in 007 First Light as a field analyst who assists Bond in the field rather than simply being M's secretary as in the original stories. The character played a similar role in the field during Skyfall's prologue sequence. Moneypenny is voiced by Kiera Lester. With the exception of Judi Dench, M is typically portrayed by an older male actor, inspired by Fleming's own superior officer at the Naval Intelligence Division. Priyanga Burford's version of M in 007 First Light is younger than previous iterations of the character and actively supports and encourages Bond's growth as an agent rather than clashing with him as in previous depictions. John Greenway, portrayed by Lennie James, is an original character created for the game and a senior MI6 field agent, conceived as a 'mentor figure'. Q is portrayed as older than the previous iteration of the character by Ben Whishaw in the Craig films, though not as old as Desmond Llewelyn or John Cleese. Actor Alastair Mackenzie played Q as more befitting the "cool uncle figure" he viewed the character as when growing up.

=== Music ===
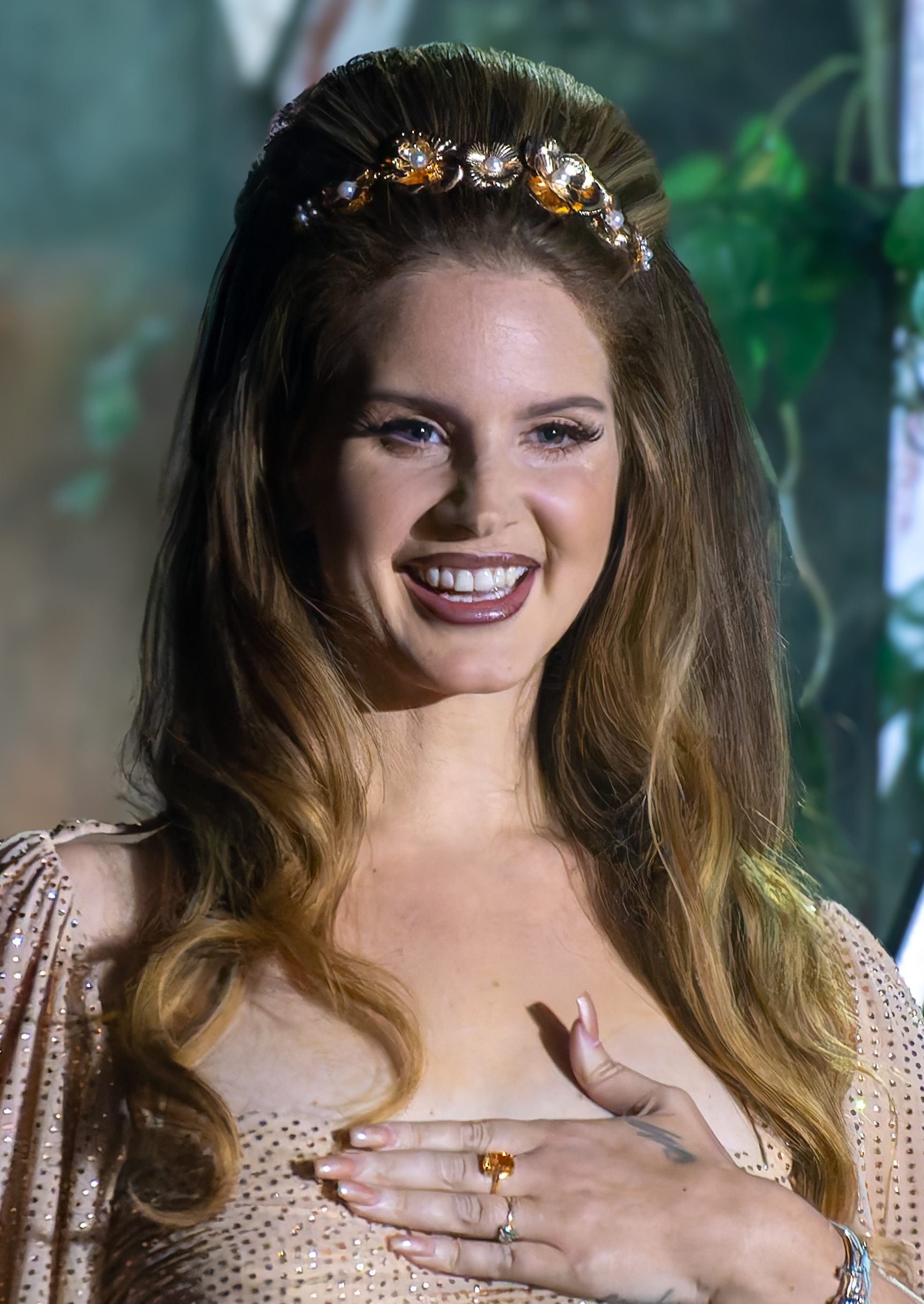
Lana Del Rey sings the game's theme song, "First Light".

The musical score for 007 First Light was composed by the Flight. IO Interactive felt that they were the right choice to score a younger Bond as they could blend cinematic orchestral music with more modern electronic textures that had not been heard in the Bond franchise before. While classic John Barry themes feature, audio director Dominic Vega said that the young Bond has to "earn his themes" as he grows throughout the game's story.

In October 2025, reports emerged that a song called "First Light" by American singer-songwriter Lana Del Rey was registered with the American Society of Composers, Authors and Publishers (ASCAP). On 16 April 2026, "First Light" was revealed as the game's theme song; it was co-written and produced by James Bond film composer David Arnold. Del Rey had previously submitted the song "24" for Craig's film Spectre (2015), which was rejected: Del Rey instead included the song on her fourth studio album, Honeymoon (2015). Polygon wrote that Del Rey's "First Light" is "fully committed to the storied legacy of Bond themes, even to a fault" with its jangling guitar and orchestral swells. The game's soundtrack album by the Flight, was released on 31 July 2026 by Milan Records.

== Release ==
IO Interactive held a livestream on 19 November 2020 to announce their next game following the then-upcoming Hitman 3 (2021), which concluded with the reveal of Project 007, a new James Bond video game with an original story developed and published by IOI, in collaboration with Metro-Goldwyn-Mayer, Eon Productions, and licensee Delphi Interactive. The announcement coincided with the official start of development at IOI's Denmark and Sweden studios. The game is being developed on the Glacier Engine for "modern systems and platforms". In February 2025, Amazon MGM Studios took over supervisory duties on the title after acquiring full creative and production rights to the James Bond IP from Eon and former film franchise producers Michael G. Wilson and Barbara Broccoli, making it the first Bond game to be released since Eon's departure from the series. The game was confirmed to be launching on Nintendo Switch 2 during the April 2025 instalment of Nintendo Direct.

The game was formally unveiled as 007 First Light on 2 June 2025, with the game's first trailer premiering at Sony Interactive Entertainment's State of Play presentation on 4 June, and the title later appearing during the publisher's IOI Showcase digital presentation on 6 June. SIE hosted a dedicated State of Play presentation on 3 September 2025 that unveiled gameplay and narrative details, as well as the cast. On 24 September, it was announced at Tokyo Game Show that Gemma Chan will play as Dr. Selina Tan, an original character created by IOI. On 11 December, it was announced at The Game Awards 2025 that Lenny Kravitz will portray the antagonist Bawma.

The game was originally announced to be released for Nintendo Switch 2, PlayStation 5, Windows, and Xbox Series X/S on 27 March 2026. In December 2025, the release date was delayed to 27 May 2026. In April 2026, the Nintendo Switch 2 version was delayed to the third quarter of 2026, and in September 2026 was delayed to March 2027, with a final release date of 18 March 2027 being announced in October. IO Interactive CEO Hakan Abrak stated that the developers pushed it to later in the summer season to allow more work on optimization, but that they were working to get it ready due to the legacy of Bond games on Nintendo platforms.

=== Promotion ===
IO Interactive partnered with Coca-Cola for promotion of 007 First Light with themed cans of Zero Sugar Zero Caffeine offering competition prizes, including in-game outfits for Bond and a one-of-a-kind 007 First Light-themed Xbox Series X. From 14 May to 10 June 2026, a free copy of 007 First Light is bundled with the purchase of an Nvidia GeForce RTX 50 series graphics card.

== Reception ==
=== Critical reception ===
Reception

Aggregate scores
Aggregator	Score
Metacritic	(PC) 84/100 (PS5) 87/100 (XSXS) 88/100
OpenCritic	97% recommend (Note: Based on 60 reviews)

Review scores
Publication	Score
Eurogamer	4/5
GameSpot	8/10
GamesRadar+	4/5
IGN	9/10
PCGamesN	8/10
Shacknews	9/10
TechRadar	4/5
The Guardian	5/5
Video Games Chronicle	5/5

007 First Light received "generally favorable" reviews, according to review aggregator website Metacritic.

Writing for Eurogamer, Rick Lane felt that 007 First Light "isn't the Bond game that I wanted from IO Interactive [...] [b]ut I had a great time with it regardless". He especially praised the game's writing, noting that "almost every line lands with wit, soul, or both", and describing it as the best-written AAA game since Marvel's Guardians of the Galaxy. Lane commended Bond's characterization, noting how the "younger and more unrefined" Bond present in the game was also "perhaps the most empathetic Bond yet", but felt that "the real surprise in First Light is how strong the secondary cast is", praising the variety of the game's original characters. Regarding the gameplay, Lane noted that 007 First Light is largely a linear action-adventure game, but "frequently pretends that it isn't". He felt that the game occasionally pretended to open up and provide the player with a number of possible solutions, but ultimately funnelled them towards a specific intended path. However, he praised the game's close-quarters combat, as well as its "bluffing" mechanic, which he saw as a novel addition. Lane noted that despite what he felt were immensely enjoyable levels, many of them existed not as distinct locations, but as "spaces that Bond is just passing through on the way to his next objective", hurting their memorability.

Mark Delaney of GameSpot very directly compared 007 First Light to the Hitman franchise, also developed by IO Interactive. He specifically called out the frequency of needing to distract or otherwise sneak past guards, hanging from ledges or pipes, eavesdropping on conversations, and lying to enemies, all of which he noted were staples of Hitman. Delaney complimented the game's hand-to-hand combat systems, especially praising the interactivity of the environment in combat. He also praised the gunplay, noting how guns "never have much ammo with them", which requires the player to "frequently change what [they're] armed with by taking them off defeated enemies". Delaney additionally praised how well he felt the franchise's tropes fit into the structure of a video game, noting the versatility of gadgets that helped "ensure the spirit of the Bond character is alive". However, he criticised the pacing, feeling that 007 First Light's 20-hour runtime resulted in some sections that were significantly slower than others.

Amelia Schwanke of TechRadar commended 007 First Light's cinematic sequences, stating that "IO Interactive has managed to make a [...] game that truly feels like you're playing a James Bond in a movie". She complimented the cinematic training montage towards the beginning of the game, which she said felt "straight out of a Rocky film, quickly switching you from one exercise to the next". Schwanke noted that this cinematic attention to detail was spread throughout the entire game, and was especially visible in the original depiction of James Bond with "no Daniel Craig or Pierce Brosnan shadow hanging over him". She also noted Bond's cocky attitude, which came off as "more eye-roll inducing than funny", but felt it worked in the game's favor due to Bond being far younger and less refined than in other depictions. She praised the variety and open-ended nature of the stealth sequences, although she noted that they were significantly "stripped back" compared to the sandbox gameplay of Hitman. Schwanke also praised the gadget system, which she felt was reminiscent of the Batman: Arkham games, as well as the cinematic variety of the game's setpieces, which she compared to Naughty Dog's Uncharted series. However, she noted the frequency of physics-related glitches, as well as the driving sections, which she felt were "tacked on" due to their legacy in the Bond franchise and "not nearly as dynamic as [they] could've been".

=== Sales ===
007 First Light sold 1.5 million units within the first day of release. The game sold 2.7 million units within the first week of release. It had sold 4 million units by 20 August 2026.

In Japan, the game debuted at #2 on the top 20 games sold in the country from 25–31 May. The game debuted at #1 in the United Kingdom.

=== Awards ===
Awards and nominations for 007 First Light
Year	Award	Category	Result	Ref.
2025	The Game Awards 2025	Most Anticipated Game	Nominated	
2026	Golden Joystick Awards 2026	Ultimate Game of the Year	Nominated	
2026	Golden Joystick Awards 2026	Best Lead Performer (Patrick Gibson)	Nominated	
2026	Golden Joystick Awards 2026	Best Supporting Performer (Lennie James)	Nominated	
2026	Golden Joystick Awards 2026	Best Soundtrack	Nominated	
2026	Golden Joystick Awards 2026	Best Storytelling	Nominated	
2026	Golden Joystick Awards 2026	Console Game of the Year	Nominated	
2026	2026 TIGA Awards	Game of the Year	Won	
2026	The Game Awards 2026	Game of the Year	Pending	
2026	The Game Awards 2026	Best Action/Adventure Game	Pending	
2026	The Game Awards 2026	Best Narrative	Pending	
2026	The Game Awards 2026	Best Performance (Patrick Gibson)	Pending	
2027	69th Annual Grammy Awards	Best Score Soundtrack for Video Games and Other Interactive Media	Pending	

== Future ==
IO Interactive CEO Hakan Abrak expressed in an interview with IGN that he wished for 007 First Light to lead into a potential trilogy of James Bond video games for the publisher, citing the decision to create a new, younger version of the character for gaming audiences to "call their own and grow with". Abrak previously stated his desire to progress the James Bond narrative through "multiple" games in a similar fashion to the Hitman: World of Assassination trilogy, stating that such an ambition motivated them to pursue a licencing deal after previously rejecting offers for other video games using external properties. Following the game's release, Amazon Game Studios general manager Jeff Gattis confirmed that following Amazon MGM Studios' acquisition of the franchise license from Eon Productions in 2025, future James Bond games, including sequels to First Light, would be published and possibly developed by Amazon, as opposed to IO Interactive's self-publishing arrangement on this title. However, Gattis later appeared to retract the statement, suggesting that audiences "probably want IOI developing [a sequel]" given the success of the game, and further clarifying that no decisions had been made on Amazon's potential involvement.
