= James Bond in video games =

Video game franchise

James Bond
- Genres: Shooter, action-adventure, racing
- Publishers: Richard Shepherd Software; Parker Brothers; Mindscape; Domark; Amstrad; Interplay Entertainment; THQ; Nintendo; Electronic Arts; Activision; IO Interactive
- Creator: Ian Fleming
- Platforms: Atari 2600, Atari 5200, Atari 8-bit, ColecoVision, Commodore 64, SG-1000, Amstrad CPC, Apple II, Mac, MSX, Oric 1, Oric Atmos, Amstrad PCW, BBC Micro, Amiga, Atari ST, MS-DOS, Master System, NES, Super NES, Genesis, Game Gear, Nintendo 64, Game Boy, dedicated, PlayStation, Game Boy Color, PlayStation 2, GameCube, Xbox, Windows, Game Boy Advance, Nintendo DS, PlayStation Portable, PlayStation 3, Wii, Xbox 360, Wii U, Nintendo Switch, Xbox One, Xbox Series X/S, Nintendo Switch 2, PlayStation 5
- First release: Shaken but Not Stirred; 1982
- Latest release: 007 First Light; 2026
- Parent series: James Bond

The James Bond video game franchise is a series centering on Ian Fleming's fictional British MI6 agent of the same name. Games of the series have been predominantly shooter games, with some games of other genres including role-playing and adventure games. Several games are based upon the James Bond films and developed and published by a variety of companies. The intellectual property is owned by Danjaq.

== History ==
Release timeline
1982	Shaken but Not Stirred
1983
1984	James Bond 007
1985	A View to a Kill
1985	A View to a Kill
1986	Goldfinger
1987	The Living Daylights
1988	Live and Let Die
1989	License to Kill
1989	James Bond 007 Action Pack
1990	The Spy Who Loved Me
1990	007 James Bond: The Stealth Affair
1991	James Bond Jr.
1992
1993	James Bond 007: The Duel
1994
1995
1996
1997	GoldenEye 007
1998	James Bond 007
1999	Tomorrow Never Dies
2000	The World Is Not Enough (N64)
2000	The World Is Not Enough (PS)
2000	007 Racing
2001	The World Is Not Enough (GBC)
2001	James Bond 007: Agent Under Fire
2002	James Bond 007: Nightfire
2003	James Bond 007: Everything or Nothing (GBA)
2004	James Bond 007: Everything or Nothing (home consoles)
2004	GoldenEye: Rogue Agent
2005	From Russia with Love
2006
2007
2008	Quantum of Solace
2009
2010	GoldenEye 007
2010	James Bond 007: Blood Stone
2011
2012	007 Legends
2013
2014
2015	James Bond: World of Espionage
2016
2017
2018
2019
2020
2021
2022
2023	Cypher 007
2024
2025
2026	007 First Light

=== Early era (1983–1994) ===
The first James Bond game, Shaken but Not Stirred, was released in 1982. In 1984, Parker Brothers published James Bond 007 for multiple platforms.

Since 1983, there have been numerous video games based on the films, Ian Fleming's novels, and original scripts created by the developer or publisher of the game. Mindscape, Domark, Interplay, and THQ all created James Bond games.

The video games were somewhat profitable in the 1980s and early 1990s, featuring a mixture of styles including side-scrolling action and text adventure.

=== Nintendo era (1995–1998) ===
The popularity of the James Bond video game series did not rise quickly until 1997's GoldenEye 007 by Rare for the Nintendo 64. GoldenEye 007 expanded on the plot of the film GoldenEye and is a first-person shooter with a multiplayer mode. The game received very positive reviews and sold over eight million copies.

In 1998, Nintendo released James Bond 007 for the Game Boy developed by Saffire. The game features a story including characters from multiple James Bond films, such as Oddjob and Jaws. It also incorporates gambling minigames, such as Baccarat and Blackjack.

=== Electronic Arts era (1999–2005) ===
Electronic Arts (EA) took over the license from MGM Interactive when a video game based on Tomorrow Never Dies was in development in 1998. Taking the initial concepts for the video game adaptation, developer Black Ops Entertainment handled the final form of the title and the game saw the light of day in 1999 on PlayStation and met mixed reviews from critics, albeit becoming a financial success. The following entry was to be based on The World Is Not Enough, consisting of several versions released on multiple platforms, including one on Nintendo 64 developed by Eurocom, a version for PlayStation developed by Black Ops Entertainment, and Game Boy Color by 2n Productions, with all three meeting different results in spite of being commercially successful. Unlike the former two versions – first-person shooters – the Game Boy Color version is played from a top-down perspective.

In 2001, EA released Agent Under Fire for PlayStation 2, GameCube, and Xbox, featuring an original storyline and lacking the likeness of then Bond actor Pierce Brosnan. The game added the elements of "rail" shooting and driving segments to a first-person shooter. The game sold nearly 5 million copies, making it the second-most successful game in the series, while only receiving mixed reviews. There are no differences between the console versions.

In 2002, Nightfire was released, coinciding with the 40th anniversary of the film franchise and using Brosnan's likeness for the Bond character, but not his voice. It was developed by Eurocom for the GameCube, PlayStation 2, and Xbox consoles, with a PC port by Gearbox Software and a Mac port by Aspyr. The computer versions are substantially different from the console versions, featuring different missions, a modified story line, and online play. In 2003, the game also had a Game Boy Advance version by JV Games, which also differs from both the console versions and PC versions.

In 2004, EA released Everything or Nothing, developed by EA Redwood, for the GameCube, PlayStation 2 and Xbox. Unlike the two previous installments, Everything or Nothing is a third-person shooter with driving missions, and it stars the voices and likenesses of Pierce Brosnan, Judi Dench, Willem Dafoe and John Cleese, among others. It was written by the scriptwriter of GoldenEye and Tomorrow Never Dies, screenwriter Bruce Feirstein, with a plot connected to the Roger Moore Bond film A View to a Kill. It was released to mostly positive reviews. A different version of Everything or Nothing was also developed by Griptonite Games for the Game Boy Advance.

Later that year, GoldenEye: Rogue Agent was released on the same platforms with the exception of the Game Boy Advance version. A first-person shooter loosely connected to the Bond franchise a spin-off, it stars a former MI6 spy known as "GoldenEye", who works for Auric Goldfinger against Dr. Julius No. The game received mixed reviews. The game was released on PlayStation 2, Xbox, GameCube and Nintendo DS. EA listed 007 Racing and GoldenEye: Rogue Agent as spin-offs, out of their canonical order they have built.

2005 saw the release of From Russia with Love, based on the 1963 film of the same name. It stars Sean Connery as James Bond, and the other characters had the same likeness of the original cast. The game is a third-person shooter in the same style as Everything or Nothing, with expansions in the story and certain details changed (such as trading SPECTRE for OCTOPUS, due to legal problems). The game received positive reviews, and was released on GameCube, Xbox, PS2 and PSP.

Electronic Arts announced in 2006 a game based on then-upcoming Casino Royale, but it ended up being cancelled, because it would not be ready by the film's release in November. This fact, which would lead MGM to lose millions in licensing fees, along with EA's commitment to move away from movie franchise games and focus more on internal intellectual properties, led the company to abandon the Bond franchise in May 2006.

=== Activision era (2006–2013) ===
Shortly after Electronic Arts abandoned the license, in May 2006, Activision acquired non-exclusive rights to develop and publish James Bond games, which were to become exclusive in 2007. Activision's first game was Quantum of Solace, which was based on the 2008 film of the same name as well as the previous film Casino Royale. It was developed by Treyarch for PlayStation 3, Xbox 360, Wii and PC; Eurocom for PlayStation 2 and Vicarious Visions for the Nintendo DS. The game was released on 31 October 2008 and received mixed reviews, with the PlayStation 2 version receiving the best reviews.

At E3 2010, Nintendo revealed GoldenEye 007, a remake of the 1997 game that was released on Nintendo 64. The remake initially targeted and was released for the Wii and Nintendo DS with a more modernized plot based on a script by Bruce Feirstein, with then-Bond actor Daniel Craig portraying 007. The Wii version was developed by Eurocom and ran on EngineX, a game engine previously used for the rail shooter Dead Space: Extraction, while the Nintendo DS version was developed by n-Space. It was released in November 2010 in all regions to positive reviews from critics. Approximately a year later, an enhanced port of the game entitled GoldenEye 007: Reloaded was released for PlayStation 3 and Xbox 360. The port featured HD graphics, new missions and PlayStation Move support on the PS3 version.

Activision's third Bond game, Blood Stone was released on the same day as GoldenEye 007 in November 2010. Developed by Bizarre Creations, the game returned to being a third person shooter, featured an original story and starred Daniel Craig, Judi Dench and Joss Stone, the latter of which also sang on the game's theme song "I'll Take It All". It was released for PlayStation 3, Xbox 360, PC and DS and received mixed reviews from critics. Developer Bizarre Creations was closed down by Activision in early 2011 just a few months after the game's release.

On 19 April 2012, Activision announced plans for a game titled 007 Legends to coincide with the fiftieth anniversary of the James Bond film franchise. The game was described as a "greatest hits compilation", retelling six film narratives with an overarching storyline to connect them together. The missions were revealed to be based upon Goldfinger, On Her Majesty's Secret Service, Moonraker, Licence to Kill and Die Another Day. On 9 November 2012, Activision added the last mission to the game, released as a downloadable content, which was based on Skyfall. The game was released for PlayStation 3, Xbox 360, PC and Wii U and received mixed reviews from critics. Developer Eurocom shut down soon after the game's release in December 2012.

On 4 January 2013, Activision and Steam's online stores removed online availability and pages for Quantum of Solace, Blood Stone, and 007 Legends without explanation or warning, only to confirm three days later that the James Bond game license was revoked. A month later, Activision themselves declared that they would be backing away from licensed games in a formal statement.

=== Hiatus (2014–2019) ===
On 7 January 2014, president and co-founder of Telltale Games, Kevin Bruner had expressed an interest in making a future James Bond game if he were afforded the chance. He stated that "I'm a giant James Bond fan and I'm always frustrated by games that make him a mass murderer." When he was asked which license he would adapt next if money and licensing hurdles were not a factor. "He's a super-spy, and that's a different skillset. The films make him less of a mass murderer, and there's not much killing in the books – more spying and intrigue." A rumour surfaced in June 2017 that Telltale was working on a video game entitled 007 Solstice. However, its status proved unlikely when Telltale filed for bankruptcy and closed down in November 2018.

On 21 January 2016, president of Curve Digital Dominic Wheatley expressed his interest alongside the company in the series, saying "I'd be very happy to have a James Bond licence. We could do a cracking game around that," adding that these opportunities are overlooked by the bigger firms, since Electronic Arts and Activision have their own IPs and no longer want to "promote someone else's brand."

In 2016, Traveller's Tales attempted to pitch a Lego video game adapting the film series to The Lego Group, who ultimately passed on the project feeling as if the mature tone and explicit depictions of violence and sexuality in the series, did not suit the comparatively younger audience for Lego games. An internally produced trailer for the game under the codename "Gold", which showed a sizzle reel of recreated moments from the Bond films, was leaked in December 2024 and corroborated by former TT Games tech director Paul Hughes.

=== IO Interactive era (2020–present) ===
In September 2020, the smartphone game Cypher 007 was released on the Apple Arcade subscription service and received positive attention from James Bond fans.

In November 2020, IO Interactive announced Project 007, a new James Bond video game developed in association with Delphi Interactive, working closely with licensors MGM and Eon Productions. IO described the game as a "wholly original Bond story" where "players will step into the shoes of the world's favorite Secret Agent to earn their 00 status in the very first Bond origin story." The game was officially unveiled as 007 First Light in June 2025, and was released on 26 May 2026 for PlayStation 5, Windows and Xbox Series X/S. The role of James Bond is portrayed by Irish actor Patrick Gibson, who provides both voice acting and motion capture performance.

== Cancelled games ==
Octopussy (1983)

A video game was announced, titled Octopussy, based on the film of the same name. The game was planned for release on the Atari 2600 System, Mattel Intellivision, and compatible systems. Set for release in the summer of 1983, it was cancelled for unknown reasons shortly after it was announced by Parker Brothers.

GoldenEye 007 (1997; 2008)

A racing version of GoldenEye 007 was announced for the Virtual Boy. The game was cancelled in 1996.

A remastered version of the Nintendo 64 game GoldenEye 007 by Rare was scheduled for release on Xbox 360's Live Arcade on 27 February 2008, but Microsoft (who acquired Rare and their intellectual properties in 2002) couldn't get the publishing rights from the intellectual property owners, Danjaq, LLC, resulting in the cancelation of the project, despite being nearly completed. It was rumored that Nintendo (the publisher of the original title) or Activision (who had exclusive rights to publish video games based on the James Bond franchise at the time) may have been involved in the project's cancellation, but no sources confirm the rumor. Despite this, in January 2021, a near-final build of the game was leaked online from an unknown source, which led to many players playing the ROM via emulation.

Tomorrow Never Dies: The Mission Continues (1998)

The original VHS release of Tomorrow Never Dies featured a brief trailer with Desmond Llewelyn which highlighted a game that would "start where the film ends". Footage shows Bond skiing, scuba diving and driving in third person and on a first-person shooting mission. The game was to come out on PlayStation and PC in the fall of 1998 and was being made by MGM Interactive, not EA; EA was not involved in Bond until November of that year. Because MGM's motion picture division had licensed exclusive James Bond console rights to Nintendo (for GoldenEye 007 for the Nintendo 64), MGM had to buy some of their rights back from Nintendo in order to make the game.

A Tomorrow Never Dies game was released on 16 November 1999, distributed by EA, but with notable differences from the 1998 attempt. The game was a third-person shooter with no scuba diving level. The story follows the plot of the film, not the continuation that had been planned. A level in the game sees Bond skiing down a mountain and killing a Japanese terrorist named Sotoshi Isagura (who had featured very briefly in the film), while in another stage Bond has a driving mission in Switzerland. These were not from the original film so may have survived from the 'continuation' story.

The World Is Not Enough (2000)

A game based on the 1999 film The World Is Not Enough film and using the Quake III Arena engine for the PC and PlayStation 2 was cancelled in favour of Agent Under Fire. Electronic Arts thought, by 2001, that too much time had passed since the release of the film, and that fans would be no longer interested in the product as talks of the succeeding film in the series, Die Another Day, were taking place.

007 Racing sequel (2001)

A PlayStation 2 sequel to 007 Racing was rumoured to be in development.

Bond6 (2005)

EA Games began conceptual work on the game in 2003, under the working title of Bond6. The game was originally meant to be released in 2005, set to star Pierce Brosnan as James Bond. A video game adaptation of From Russia with Love began development when Brosnan announced that he was stepping down from the role, which ended plans for Bond6. The opening level planned for the former was retooled for the latter, and CGI work intended for the game was reused in television commercials for GoldenEye: Rogue Agent.

Casino Royale (2006)

A game was in development based on the film of the same name. Daniel Craig, in character as Bond, was going to give his voice and likeness to the video game. It was set to release on the PlayStation 3 and Xbox 360 platforms. The game was 15% developed when the project was cancelled, as Electronic Arts would not finish it by the film's release in November 2006. Later, unfinished development screenshots from the Venice level were uncovered. Activision's debut in the series, Quantum of Solace, combines the storylines of Casino Royale and Quantum of Solace.

Blood Stone sequel (2011)

In December 2010, some screenshots and a video were leaked online that depicted a new James Bond game, which shared similar gameplay to its predecessor, Blood Stone. Reportedly, the project had been in development by Raven Software, but was postponed six months prior to the leak, at which point the game was believed to be back in development. However, the game was ultimately cancelled due to Blood Stone's poor sales.

Skyfall (2012)

In January 2012, it was announced that a video game based on Skyfall would be released by Activision. Ultimately, a downloadable level based on Skyfall was released for Activision's 007 Legends, although a full game was not released.

Lego James Bond

In 2005 TT Games produced a test animation as part of a pitch for a Lego James Bond video game. While the project was initially approved by Lego, Activision and the Broccoli family, the idea was abandoned shortly after the release of Casino Royale a year later, as the films darker and more violent tone was considered unsuitable for Lego's family-friendly demographic.

In 2016, TT Games pitched another James Bond themed entry in their long running line of Lego games, which would adapt the events of multiple films. The pitch was rejected for largely the same reasons. A trailer for the game was later leaked in 2024.

== Other games ==
=== Mobile and smartphone games ===
Since 2002, games featuring the Bond character and the 007 trademark have been published and distributed on mobile phones. The first two are based on action sequences from Die Another Day, one of them is titled Hover Chase and the other is Ice Racer. Both were published by Vodafone.

With the official reboot of the film franchise in 2006, Sony Online Entertainment released a side-scroll action game based on Casino Royale developed by Glu Mobile, following a storyline inspired by the film. Similarly, an identical tie-in based on Quantum of Solace was released in 2008 by the same team. The same year, Sony Online Entertainment Los Angeles developed and published an arcade fighting game to coincide with the aforementioned film, entitled Top Agent.

In 2014, it was reported that Glu Mobile was working on another mobile game bearing the James Bond license. A year later, its title was revealed as World of Espionage, a point-and-click game retelling several previous storylines from the film series, debuting an early access mode in July 2015 and releasing a full version of the game in November later that year. The game, after being universally panned for its uninspired content, was removed from the online mobile stores in December 2016 and Glu Mobile pulled the plug on the title.

=== Fanmade remakes ===
With the popularity laid by GoldenEye 007 in 1997 on the Nintendo 64, fans of the video game have made many attempts to remake or recreate the title with updated makeovers on current engines over time. But, only one project succeeded. Entitled GoldenEye: Source, the game entered development in 2005 and officially saw its international release in 2010, five years after being in beta mode hosted by the Source engine. It is a total conversion mod based on the multiplayer mode from the aforementioned title.

A different team initiated similar attempts in 2013 to port the multiplayer mode from Nightfire (2002) to the Source engine, hoping to release it on Steam under the title Nightfire: Source. The project, as of today, remains in development.

To commemorate the video game's 25th anniversary, another project based on GoldenEye 007 entered development in 2017 on Unreal Engine 4, with the aim of releasing it sometime in August 2022, based on the title's single-player campaign. However, in August 2020, the team received a cease and desist letter from Danjaq, forbidding the remake and stripping its use of any licensed asset related to the property, including James Bond and related characters. The project was reborn as Spies Don't Die – an original experience "inspired by 90s first-person shooters".

=== Appearance in other media ===
Downloadable content featuring a pack of cars used in the James Bond films is available in Forza Horizon 4, officially branded and licensed by Danjaq, LLC.

James Bond is parodied in Broforce as a playable character, Double Bro Seven, whose name is a pun on Bond's code number 007, with his appearance being based on either Sean Connery, George Lazenby or Pierce Brosnan. Just like the actual Bond, he wears a tuxedo and uses a pistol. Unlike other characters in the game, he has a variety of special skills, including a martini, needed for a trophy called "Shaken, not stirred", which is a joke on a famous Bond catchphrase.

The Proximity Mine item from GoldenEye 007 is present in Nintendo's Super Smash Bros. series, where it is renamed the Motion-Sensor Bomb. It was first introduced to the series in the first game and made a return in all non-Japanese versions of Super Smash Bros. Melee. The Japanese version of Super Smash Bros. Melee instead has the item's design from Perfect Dark, the spiritual successor to GoldenEye 007. Additionally, references to GoldenEye 007 is minimized, with the origin of the Motion-Sensor Bomb listed as "TOP SECRET" in the Western releases. From Super Smash Bros. Brawl onward, the Motion Sensor-Bomb was redesigned completely with any resemblance to its original design gone and is instead treated as an original item from the Super Smash Bros. series.
