= GoldenEye: Rogue Agent =

2004 video game

- Developers: EA Los Angeles; EA Tiburon & n-Space (DS)
- Publisher: EA Games
- Producers: Chris Plummer; Matt Sentell
- Designer: Dan Orzuluk
- Programmers: Simon Golding; Wei Shoong Teh
- Artist: Jay Riddle
- Writers: Danny Bilson; Paul De Meo
- Composer: Paul Oakenfold
- Series: James Bond
- Platforms: GameCube, PlayStation 2, Xbox, Nintendo DS
- Release: GameCube, PlayStation 2, Xbox: NA: 22 November 2004; AU: 23 November 2004; AU: 30 November 2004 (GCN); EU: 3 December 2004; JP: 13 January 2005 (except Xbox); Nintendo DS: NA: 13 June 2005; EU: 1 July 2005; JP: 4 August 2005
- Genres: First-person shooter, action adventure
- Modes: Single-player, multiplayer

GoldenEye: Rogue Agent (Note: Released in Japan on non-Xbox platforms as GoldenEye: Dark Agent (ゴールデンアイ ダーク・エージェント).) is a first-person shooter video game in the James Bond franchise, developed by EA Los Angeles and published by Electronic Arts. The player takes the role of an ex-MI6 agent, who is recruited by Auric Goldfinger (a member of a powerful unnamed criminal organization based on Ian Fleming's SPECTRE) to assassinate his rival Dr. No. Several other characters from the Bond franchise make appearances throughout the game, including Pussy Galore, Oddjob, Xenia Onatopp and Francisco Scaramanga.

Despite being part of the larger James Bond franchise, the game has no relation to the 1995 film or the 1997 video game of the same name. In this setting the game's protagonist is given the name 'GoldenEye' after he loses his eye and receives a gold-colored cybernetic replacement. Electronic Arts has listed the title along with 007 Racing (2000) as spin-offs that do not make part of the canon they have built with Tomorrow Never Dies (1999).

GoldenEye: Rogue Agent received mixed reviews from critics who praised the unique premise and multiplayer mode, but criticised the bland gameplay, plot, departure from the Bond canon, and misleading use of the GoldenEye name.

== Gameplay ==
GoldenEye: Rogue Agent is a first-person shooter, played across eight levels. The player can use various types of handheld weapons throughout the game, as well as the GoldenEye, which has four abilities: MRI vision, allowing the player to see through walls; EM hack, allowing the player to hack electronic systems, machines, and enemies' weapons; a polarity shield, which deflects incoming bullets; and a magnetic field, which allows the player to send enemies flying to their deaths. Each ability is granted to the player as the game progresses. Each ability requires a certain amount of energy, seen on a meter. After using an ability, the meter slowly recharges itself. There are various weapons to collect, allowing the player to fight with a single one-handed weapon, dual wield two of such weapons, or use powerful two-handed weapons. The player's free hand can also be used to throw grenades or take hostages, using them as human shields to make it difficult for enemies to hit the player.

=== Multiplayer ===
The game featured a highly customizable multiplayer component with four-player split screen play, as well as online play on non-Nintendo versions, which supported up to 8 players. The Xbox version of the game also includes system link support, and up to 8 consoles can be linked together. On 1 October, 2006, the online servers for both of such versions were shut down due to "inactivity" online. Players can unlock additional customization options, skins, maps, and gametype variations by playing through Story Mode earning Octopus tokens based on performance. There are some locked skins such as Oddjob, Dr. No, and Xenia Onatopp. There are also locked maps such as the Pump Room, Carver's Press, the Bath House, the Vault Core, the Lower Turbine, Dr. No's reactor, the Fissure Platform, and GoldenEye's Retreat.

The Nintendo DS version implements multiplayer via the system's local wireless connectivity. Up to 8 players can play in DS Download Play with only one copy of the game, with only one map and the standard deathmatch mode available to play with. Players who each have their copy of the game will gain access to the full version of multiplayer, which only supports 4 players, but offers more maps and additional team-based game modes.

== Plot ==
MI6 director M (head of MI6) gives her evaluation of one of her 00 agents who lost his right eye in an encounter with Dr. Julius No three years ago. The agent has since become obsessed with revenge and often resorts to brutality to complete his missions. M concludes that the agent in question is no longer fit for service with MI6.

Three days earlier, the agent in question is evaluated through a holographic simulation in which he is paired with 007 to stop Auric Goldfinger, a member of a criminal organization, from detonating a suitcase nuke inside Fort Knox. The agent ultimately fails the test after failing to "save" 007 and being too late to stop the bomb. Charged with "reckless brutality", he is dismissed from MI6. As he leaves the headquarters, he reads an offer by Goldfinger to enlist in his organization.

The agent accepts Goldfinger's offer and is recruited as his enforcer, meeting with him at Auric Enterprises, where Goldfinger's scientists have developed a weapon known as the OMEN (Organic Mass Energy Neutralizer), which releases energy capable of breaking down organic matter on a nearly atomic level, resulting in disintegration. For his job of eliminating Dr. No, a fellow official of the criminal organization who has declared war on Goldfinger's branch of the organization, he is given a gold-hued cybernetic eye created by Francisco Scaramanga, another official of Goldfinger's organization. It is from this implant that he receives his codename: "GoldenEye". Scaramanga provides upgrades for the eye, starting with MRI vision.

During his first mission in Hong Kong, GoldenEye has to get a sniper rifle to take down Dr. No with the EM hack feature. At the Midas Casino, GoldenEye has to get to the vault to protect the OMEN with the magnetic polarity shield. The next mission takes place at the Hoover Dam, GoldenEye has to destroy the dam and kill Xenia Onatopp. GoldenEye also tosses Oddjob over a rail into a pit inside the Hoover Dam after he betrays and attacks GoldenEye for unknown reasons. At The Octopus, GoldenEye has to download the navigation coordinates to Crab Key (Dr. No's base) with the help of the generated force field from his golden eye.

He is eventually sent to Crab Key, where he confronts Dr. No. During their duel, GoldenEye uses his mechanical eye to sabotage the island's nuclear reactor, causing it to electrocute Dr. No. Upon No's death, Goldfinger contacts GoldenEye and informs him that he believes he is too dangerous to be left alive, and that he had contacted GoldenEye earlier and told him to activate a program which would shut down the Lair's defense grid. Goldfinger reveals that he is intent on taking over the Lair, and leaves GoldenEye to die in the impending nuclear meltdown. GoldenEye, however, manages to escape in Dr. No's osprey before the reactor overloads and the island is destroyed in a large explosion. GoldenEye returns to the Lair intent on confronting Goldfinger. Pussy Galore rendezvous with GoldenEye and informs him that Goldfinger has used the OMEN to wipe out most of the Lair's guards, and taken control of it. Scaramanga provides the mechanical eye with a computer virus that he can use to overload the OMEN.

GoldenEye fights his way through the Lair, implanting the computer virus in the process, eventually reaching Goldfinger and the OMEN. Goldfinger traps GoldenEye inside a chamber that he claims will soon be devoid of oxygen. The computer virus then activates the OMEN, causing it to explode in a burst of energy, killing Goldfinger and his troops. GoldenEye and Galore leave the Lair aboard Galore's chopper, and Scaramanga and Number One (Ernst Stavro Blofeld) later discuss what to do with GoldenEye and decide to simply see what he does next before proceeding.

=== Characters ===
Both the Campaign missions and the multiplayer game feature characters based on characters in the film adaptations of Fleming's Bond novels.

- GoldenEye: A fearsome man who used to be in service with the MI6, fired for his reckless brutality and recruited into the World's most powerful criminal organization under the employment of Auric Goldfinger. Shot in the right eye by Dr. No but merely survived during an assignment that went awry in the past, he was given a new gold-hued cybernetic eye, from which he gained his nickname, "GoldenEye". Even though he is the protagonist of the game, his face is rarely seen on screen and he never speaks. In the game's instruction manual, his surname is revealed to be Hunter.
- Auric Goldfinger: A very mysterious man who has his own firm called "Auric Enterprises", expresses an obsession with gold and wealth, and is determined to take down Dr. No, and be the sole dominant operative in the organization he works for. He is modeled after Gert Fröbe but voiced by Enn Reitel.
- Dr. Julius No: A high-ranking officer in the world's most powerful criminal organization, who went freelance, seeking world domination for his own, therefore setting up his evil schemes on his own personal island, Crab Key. He is modeled after Joseph Wiseman and was voiced by Carlos Alazraqui in the game.
- Ernst Stavro Blofeld: The head of the criminal organization, whose face is never seen on the screen, and simply called "Number One" in the game's closing credits; the name he was known by in From Russia With Love and Thunderball. Official footage of character renders released by Electronic Arts feature him holding his Persian Cat, with the likeness of Donald Pleasence. He was voiced by Gideon Emery.
- M: The head of the MI6 is a woman who has been a veteran in the business of espionage after the Cold War. She dismissed GoldenEye from duty for his "unwarranted brutality", revealing that "there is no place in the service for an agent like him". She was modelled after and was voiced by Judi Dench.
- Francisco Scaramanga: He is in charge of the operations and technological division within the criminal organization, and is often seen mentoring GoldenEye through an earpiece. He is modeled after and was voiced by Christopher Lee.
- Pussy Galore: Pussy is Goldfinger's personal pilot, who helps GoldenEye in his mission to take down his employer's chaotic plot. She is modeled after Honor Blackman but voiced by Jeannie Elias.
- Xenia Onatopp: A deadly assassin and a femme fatale, who works for Dr. No, sent to specifically eliminate GoldenEye. Her likeness is based on that of Famke Janssen's and was voiced by Jenya Lano.
- Oddjob: Goldfinger's right-hand man, a martial arts master who is also very deadly with his razor-sharp bowler hat, as well. He is the second character next to GoldenEye to never speak at all. He is modeled after Harold Sakata.
- 007: An agent of the MI6 within the Double-O Division, who was tasked with re-evaluating GoldenEye, but lost hope when the latter has proven to be a loose cannon and caused the "death" of 007 in a training simulation, therefore failing the test. Agent 007 is only seen in the first level of the game. A generic model was used for his likeness and he was voiced by Jason Carter.

== Development ==
The game was announced in February 2004, under the working title of GoldenEye 2, and was scheduled for release in the fall of 2004. It was also revealed by EA that the game takes place at the dark side of the 007 universe, in an alternate timeline, relocating the perspective at the underworld. Senior producer Chris Plummer said the game's premise was conceived after realizing that "the villains have all the cool characteristics that define the Bond universe" but without "any restrictions on how they behave". In May 2004, the game was unveiled at E3 as GoldenEye: Rogue Agent.

The game was developed using a modified version of the Medal of Honor game engine. The game used an advanced AI system for its time. Ken Adam, a production designer of the Bond films during the 1960s and 1970s, served as production designer for the game. Adam worked on several level designs that were based on locations from earlier Bond films. Kym Barrett was also involved in development, as well as Paul Oakenfold, who created the music for the game. The Studio CTO/COO was Steve Anderson and the Director of Quality Assurance was John Palmieri. Takayoshi Sato, who was known for building the character models and concept artworks for the Silent Hill video game series, served as associate art director. The Nintendo DS version, which is regarded to be the first-ever first-person shooter designed on the platform, was co-developed by EA Tiburon and n-Space and runs on a custom game engine that maintains a framerate of 30fps. Because of system limitations, the DS version is condensed from the home console versions, with minimized cutscenes among the changes.

EA's original plan was to recast every classical character derived from the series with newer actors, leading them to consider casting Jessica Biel in the role of Pussy Galore, but it eventually fell apart. Instead, they have based every single classic character on the actors and actresses that portrayed them in the films, and hired voice actors to imitate the originals for the most. A few of the exceptions have been made as well, as famous cinematic screen veterans such as Judi Dench and Christopher Lee were brought to reprise their roles, playing M and Scaramanga, respectively. The game's script was written by Danny Bilson, who had previously worked on the games James Bond 007: Agent Under Fire (2001) and James Bond 007: Nightfire (2002). Paul De Meo also wrote the script.

== Reception ==
Reception

Aggregate score
Aggregator	Score
Metacritic	(Xbox) 61/100 (GC) 60/100 (PS2) 60/100 (DS) 58/100

Review scores
Publication	Score
Edge	5/10
Electronic Gaming Monthly	7.5/10
Eurogamer	2/10
Game Informer	6.75/10
GamePro	4/5 (DS) 1.5/5
GameSpot	6.3/10
GameSpy	(DS) 3/5; 2.5/5
GameZone	(GC) 8/10 (PS2) 6/10 (Xbox) 6.6/10 (DS) 6.7/10
IGN	6.5/10 (GC) 6.3/10
Nintendo Power	(GC) 3.1/5 (DS) 6/10
Official U.S. PlayStation Magazine	3/5
Official Xbox Magazine (US)	8/10
Detroit Free Press	3/4
The Sydney Morning Herald	1.5/5

GoldenEye: Rogue Agent received "mixed or average" reviews, according to review aggregator website Metacritic. Reviewers criticized the game's lack of innovation and personality, despite its unique premise, and mediocre gameplay. Gamespot noted that the Nintendo DS version as having a smooth framerate but generally uninspired levels and weak control. IGN, however, described the console versions' visual quality as "remarkably dull" and the game in general as "a title void of passion".

Several reviewers also disliked its departure from James Bond canon in its introduction and killing off of characters. It was largely considered to be an attempt to recreate the success of one of the best-selling video games in recent history, GoldenEye 007, which was a first-person shooter for the Nintendo 64 based on the Bond film GoldenEye. Aside from the character Xenia Onatopp, the Uplink multiplayer level, and the fact that both involve a good agent going bad (although in the case of the original, not the protagonist), it had nothing to do with either the film GoldenEye or its video game adaptation, although the protagonist's scarred appearance considerably resembles Sean Bean's portrayal of rogue agent Alec Trevelyan.

The game was, however, noted for showcasing certain levels and multiplayer maps based on locations from the Bond movies, such as Fort Knox from Goldfinger, the space shuttle base from Moonraker, and Scaramanga's hideout from The Man with the Golden Gun.

During the 8th Annual Interactive Achievement Awards, Rogue Agent won the award for "Outstanding Character Performance - Female" for Judi Dench's vocal portrayal of M, as well as received a nomination for "Console First-Person Action Game of the Year".

According to Electronic Arts, GoldenEye: Rogue Agent was a commercial success, with sales above 1 million units worldwide by the end of 2004.
