= 007 Legends =

2012 video game

- Developer: Eurocom
- Publisher: Activision
- Writers: Bruce Feirstein; Robin Matthews
- Composers: David Arnold; Kevin Kiner
- Series: James Bond
- Engine: EngineXT
- Platforms: PlayStation 3 Xbox 360; Windows; Wii U
- Release: 16 October 2012: PlayStation 3 & Xbox 360; NA: 16 October 2012; EU: 19 October 2012; AU: 31 October 2012 Microsoft Windows; WW: 2 November 2012 Wii U; EU: 7 December 2012; NA: 11 December 2012
- Genre: First-person shooter
- Modes: Single-player, multiplayer

007 Legends is a 2012 first-person shooter game featuring the fictional British secret agent James Bond. It was developed by Eurocom and published by Activision in October 2012 for PlayStation 3 and Xbox 360, with Microsoft Windows and Wii U versions being released later that year. The Wii U release of the game was cancelled in Australia and the game was removed from all digital storefronts in January 2013.

The game was released to coincide with the fiftieth anniversary of the James Bond film series. To achieve this, the single player campaign includes one mission from each of the six actors' eras: Goldfinger (Sean Connery), On Her Majesty's Secret Service (George Lazenby), Moonraker (Roger Moore), Licence to Kill (Timothy Dalton) and Die Another Day (Pierce Brosnan). A level based on Skyfall (Daniel Craig) was later released as free downloadable content for the Xbox 360, PlayStation 3 and Microsoft Windows versions, and included on disc on the Wii U version. Additionally, some of the original talent from the films add their likenesses and voices to their associated characters.

Upon its release, 007 Legends received generally negative reviews from critics, who criticized the choice of missions, bland gameplay, and lack of an overarching story, though its multiplayer mode did attract some praise. It is the fourth and final James Bond game released by Activision and the last game Eurocom developed before the company ceased operations. There were no further major James Bond games made until 007 First Light in 2026.

== Gameplay ==
007 Legends is a first-person shooter game that serves as a retelling of key moments in the James Bond franchise. Here the player navigates through a level based on the film Moonraker.

007 Legends is a first-person shooter game in which the player controls James Bond in levels based on the films Die Another Day, Goldfinger, Licence to Kill, Moonraker, and On Her Majesty's Secret Service. (Note: An additional level, based on the film Skyfall, was later added as downloadable content.) The gameplay largely consists of firefights against groups of enemies across multiple locations, which several critics compared to the gameplay of the Call of Duty franchise. While in combat, the player can use iron sights, crouch behind cover, and vault over objects. Throughout the game, there are occasional sections in which the player will need to sneak past enemies. During these stealth sections, the player can knock out unsuspecting enemies or kill them with a silenced gun. The player also has access to gadgets to make the stealth sections easier, such as a wristwatch with radar to detect enemy movement, and tranquilizer darts to subdue enemies from long distance.

Whenever the player completes in-game challenges, such as kill a certain amount of enemies with one gun, they earn experience points. These can be used to purchase weapon upgrades and character improvements such as increased health and aiming speed. In addition to gunfights, there are also melee fights against bosses and driving sections. The melee fights feature quick time events, in which the player can punch by pressing the corresponding button when prompted. In the driving sections, the player escapes from pursuing enemies while dodging projectiles like rockets.

007 Legends features shorter single-player levels called MI6-Ops. These levels revolve around specific challenges, such as stealthily infiltrating a compound without alerting the target, or defending an objective against waves of enemies. If the level is completed, the player is given a score based on the difficulty option selected and the amount of time it took to complete the level. The score for MI6-Ops levels are ranked on online leaderboard against other players. 007 Legends also features multiplayer, which can be played either online with 12 players or split screen with four players. There are several multiplayer game modes such as killing other players with the golden gun from The Man with the Golden Gun, or racing to collect data from a downed plane. The player can equip gadgets to enhance their abilities in multiplayer, such as a gadget called the Fast Switch, which reduces the time it takes to switch weapons.

== Plot ==
The game begins with the opening chase sequence in Skyfall, in which MI6 agent James Bond (likeness of Daniel Craig, voice of Timothy Watson) pursues the mercenary Patrice in Istanbul, only to be accidentally shot and wounded aboard a train by his partner Eve Moneypenny (Naomie Harris). Plunging into the river below, Bond begins to flash back to several of his previous missions that took place in-between Quantum of Solace and Skyfall. However, with the release of Spectre, the game has been rendered as non-canon.

In Miami, Bond awakens in a hotel room to find Jill Masterson dead from skin suffocation, coated in gold paint. Days later in Switzerland, Bond infiltrates the facility of Auric Goldfinger (Timothy Watson, likeness of Gert Fröbe), the man responsible for Masterson's death. He discovers Goldfinger's plan to irradiate the United States Gold Depository at Fort Knox, Kentucky in Operation Grand Slam. Bond manages to convince Goldfinger's personal pilot, Pussy Galore (likeness of Honor Blackman, voice of Natasha Little), to inform the CIA, and he and the United States Army manage to thwart Goldfinger's scheme in the nick of time.

In the Swiss Alps, Bond and his lover Contessa Teresa "Tracy" di Vicenzo (likeness of Diana Rigg, voice of Nicola Walker), daughter of Italian Unione Corse boss Marc-Ange Draco, escape via skis after an attack by soldiers of Ernst Stavro Blofeld (Glenn Wrage), a terrorist mastermind residing in his mountaintop lair, Piz Gloria. Bond is injured by a helicopter gunship during the gunfire, and Tracy is in turn captured by Blofeld's men. Sometime later, Bond and Draco lead an aerial attack on Piz Gloria in order to rescue Tracy. They succeed. However, on their honeymoon, Bond and Tracy are attacked by Blofeld and the latter is killed.

Bond finds his CIA agent friend Felix Leiter (Demetri Goritsas) maimed in his house alongside his dead wife. The man responsible is Franz Sanchez (likeness of Robert Davi, voice of Rob David), a Mexican drug lord whom Bond and Leiter had unsuccessfully attempted to take down weeks earlier. On a quest for vengeance, Bond and DEA agent Pam Bouvier (Carey Lowell) infiltrate Sanchez's facility inside an old Otomi temple, intent on killing him. A car chase ensues, and Bond kills Sanchez with the lighter given to him by Felix when Bond found him on the floor.

In Iceland, Bond and NSA agent Giacinta "Jinx" Johnson (Madalena Alberto) arrive at a party held by billionaire philanthropist Gustav Graves (Toby Stephens), who is believed to be involved in the theft of military satellite components. Jinx spots Zao (Jason Wong), a rogue Korean People's Army operative who killed two of Jinx's colleagues, and believes he may be involved. They learn that Graves plans to weaponize ICARUS, a satellite used to reflect sunlight, in order to destroy South Korean forces on the DMZ, opening the way for a North Korean invasion of the South. Bond and Jinx manage to board Graves' plane after a lengthy car chase with their Aston Martin DBS V12, killing Zao in the process. The ensuing firefight causes the plane to head downwards in a tailspin, but Bond manages to kill Graves and escape with Jinx.

In Brazil, Bond and Holly Goodhead (Jane Perry), a NASA scientist moonlighting as a CIA agent, infiltrate the rocket launch facility of Hugo Drax (Michael Lonsdale), a billionaire industrialist who has started his own private space exploration program. They quickly learn that Drax, a twisted social Darwinist, intends to wipe out the human race while creating his own new "master race" from personally-selected specimens, spared from the destruction of Earth via biological weapons onboard Drax's personal space station. Bond and Goodhead manage to get on board the station via a shuttlecraft and proceed to destroy it, killing Drax in the process by blowing him out of an airlock.

Back in the present, Bond regains consciousness on the riverbank, injured, but alive. A few days later, he is seen in Shanghai, following Patrice to prevent the assassination of an unknown figure. Bond succeeds, but kicks Patrice off a building to his death before learning of his employer's identity. After finishing his report to M (Judi Dench) via phone, he is informed by Bill Tanner (Rory Kinnear) that another mission awaits him.

== Development ==
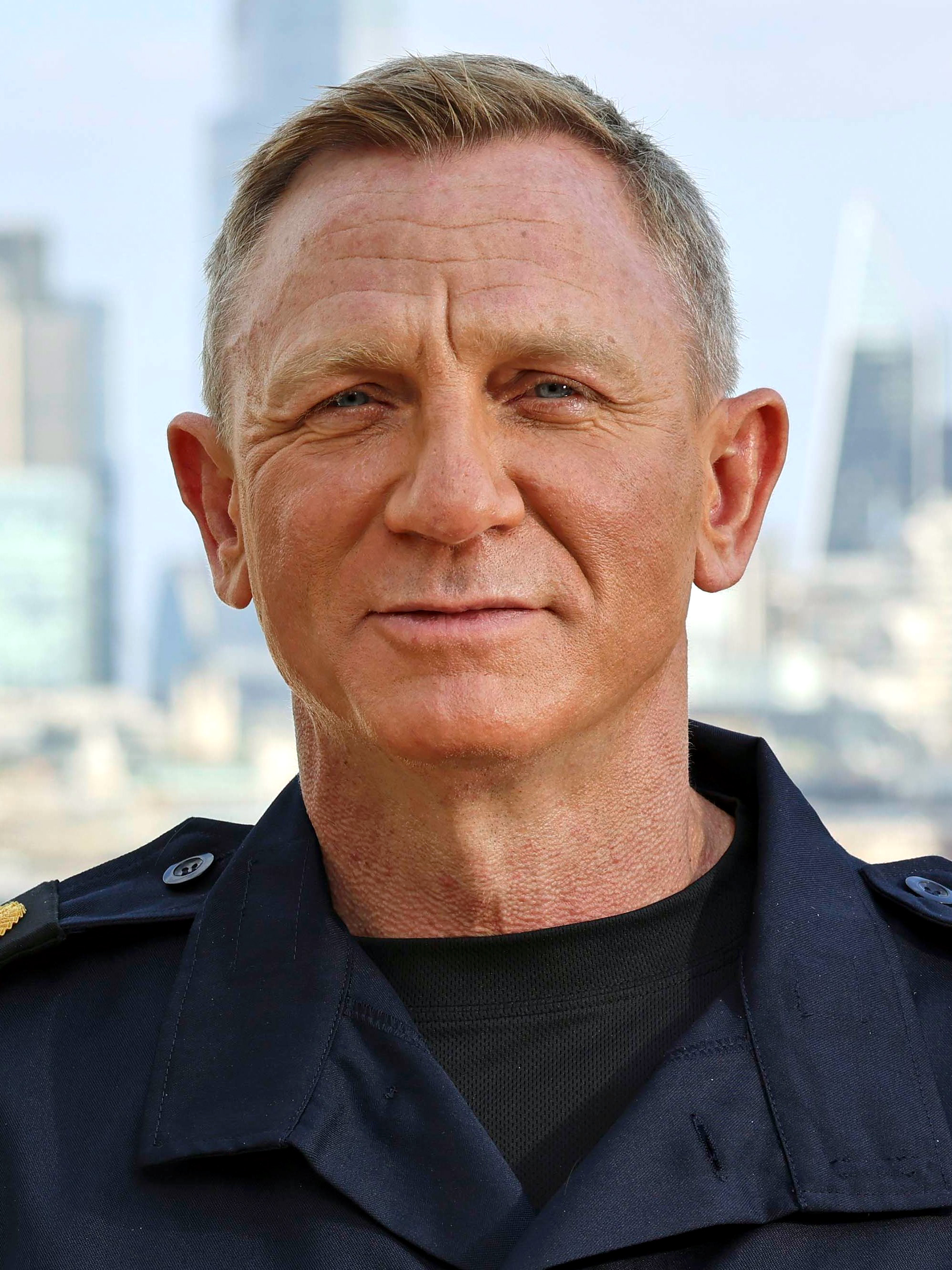
Actor Daniel Craig provides Bond's likeness in the game, replacing previous actors in their respective stories.

007 Legends was developed by Eurocom, who had previously worked on other James Bond games, such as The World Is Not Enough (2000), James Bond 007: Nightfire (2002), and GoldenEye 007 (2010). For the 50th anniversary of the James Bond film franchise, holding company Danjaq and video game publisher Activision contracted Eurocom to make a game that incorporated key moments from the franchise. Six James Bond films were selected for 007 Legends, with each film corresponding to one of the six actors who have played James Bond. Bruce Feirstein and Robin Matthews served as the screenwriters for the game.

The game was first released in North America on 16 October 2012 for PlayStation 3 and Xbox 360. A Microsoft Windows release followed on 2 November 2012. The Wii U received the final platform release in December 2012. The game is available as physical optical disc media, as well as a digital release download via PlayStation Network and Xbox Live Marketplace on date of release, though it was removed off all other digital stores without warning in January 2013. A released was planned in Australia but later cancelled. and in the United Kingdom on 21 December 2012. The single player campaign includes one mission from each of the six actors' eras (although Daniel Craig's likeness is used for Bond in all of them), being Goldfinger (Sean Connery), On Her Majesty's Secret Service (George Lazenby), Moonraker (Roger Moore), Licence to Kill (Timothy Dalton) and Die Another Day (Pierce Brosnan), with then-recent release Skyfall released as downloadable content for the Xbox 360, PS3 and PC and included on disc for the Wii U version. It remained the final James Bond video game until November 2020, when it was announced a new Bond game, 007 First Light, had entered development under IO Interactive.

Moonraker was the first mission of the game to be revealed, while the second mission is based on the film On Her Majesty's Secret Service. Goldfinger is the opening mission of the game, while Licence to Kill, and Die Another Day (the only film starring Brosnan as Bond which did not originally have a tie-in game) also feature in the story. The only mission that is not on the game disc itself is the "Skyfall" mission, which was released on 20 November 2012 as free downloadable content (DLC), since 007 Legends was released one week before Skyfall was first released in theaters. The Skyfall DLC is available for PlayStation 3, PC and the Xbox 360 and is included on the disc on the Wii U. Bruce Feirstein, who wrote three films and four games in the James Bond universe, wrote the screenplay along with Robin Matthews, who works for Eurocom. The composers from a previous release in the series, GoldenEye 007, returned to do the music score for 007 Legends. Kevin Kiner wrote and composed the soundtrack, while David Arnold wrote his own instrumental arrangement of Goldfinger for the main title sequence.

Some additional actors from the films reprise their roles in the game, whether through new voice lines or archival audio. Two Moonraker actors return to their original roles. Richard Kiel returns as the silent antagonist Jaws, while Michael Lonsdale returns as villain Hugo Drax. Rory Kinnear returns in the role of MI6 chief of staff Bill Tanner, who first portrayed the role in Quantum of Solace. Eve Moneypenny is again played by Naomie Harris, who began portraying the character in 2012's Skyfall. Die Another Day antagonist Gustav Graves is again played by Toby Stephens. Again, License to Kill actress Carey Lowell lends her voice to Pam Bouvier. Other characters have their likenesses retained, but their voices are provided by different actors. Timothy Watson provides the voice of Craig's James Bond, and also voices Auric Goldfinger, the titular villain from the film Goldfinger. Recurring Bond villain Ernst Stavro Blofeld is voiced by Glenn Wrage.

== Reception ==
Reception

Aggregate score
Aggregator	Score
Metacritic	(X360) 45/100 (PS3) 41/100 (PC) 26/100

Review scores
Publication	Score
Eurogamer	3/10
Game Informer	4/10
GameSpot	3.5/10
GamesRadar+	2.5/5
IGN	4.5/10
Nintendo Life	4/10
X-Play	1.5/5
IT News Africa	7.0/10
The Globe and Mail	5/10

007 Legends received generally unfavorable reviews from critics, according to aggregating review website Metacritic. Reviewers often commented that the game felt like a missed opportunity, and that it played like a Call of Duty clone. Some reviewers noted that the game had small moments that engaged the player as Bond, but that generally gameplay was bland and uninspired. Commentary on the game's multiplayer was mixed. While most lambasted the online play, some appreciated the inclusion of split-screen multiplayer.

Tristan Ogilvie of IGN accused the game of drowning out the Bond series' iconic moments by shoehorning them into a cheap and poorly made Call of Duty clone, further adding that the gameplay was boring and repetitive and that production had only made a half-hearted attempt to bind the chosen recreation of films together, and that the lack of overarching story offered little incentive to keep playing. Dan Ryckert of Game Informer was similarly critical of the game, describing it as "a mess of a title that's uninspired at best and nearly broken at worst", and while the review applauded the concept of remaking films in video game form, it also attacked the gameplay mechanics as overly-simplistic with the player following on-screen prompts to perform certain actions, which was broken up by "truly awful" stealth gameplay. Eurogamer's Will Porter was critical of its by-the-numbers gameplay and stated "every inch of 007 Legends has been covered in a camo-coloured Call of Duty paint." Leif Johnson of GameSpot felt that it was an "unfulfilling slog".

The Globe and Mail questioned the choice of missions in the game, claiming that fans considered them to be among the worst installments in the Bond film franchise, and that the game threw players into the middle of missions with little explanation or context to them, concluding that the game "feels like a low-budget knockoff of [...] Call of Duty". IT News Africa's Frederick Charles Fripp thought that "it could have been a better game if Eurocom focused more on improving the graphics and changing the game dynamic from a fairly linear shooter to something a bit more complex and through-provoking. [sic]" He added that "it does become a bit repetitive after a while, especially if the player does not feel challenged". Will Porter of Eurogamer felt that the heart of the films had been lost. In his review he stated "any personality the movies had is erased by the modern Daniel Craig update."

Some praise was given to the game's split-screen multiplayer modes, with IGN's Tristan Ogilvie pointing out that localized split-screen was a feature that had been frequently overlooked in first-person shooter games, before adding that there was little to separate the multiplayer of 007 Legends from that of the GoldenEye 007 remake. GameSpot's Leif Johnson also praised the split-screen multiplayer, but cited that it was more welcome due to a sparse population for online play. In Nintendo Life's review of the Wii U version, Jon Wahlgren cited that the game's multiplayer was not good enough to entice players away from their favorite online games.

Due to the reception and lowering sales of console games, Eurocom in 4Q/2012 fired 150 people from a total of 200 staff and decided to focus on mobile games. On 4 January 2013, Activision and Steam's online stores pulled the PC versions of Quantum of Solace, Blood Stone and 007 Legends, initially without explanation or warning, but which was later revealed as Activision choosing to cease their license agreement to the franchise early, which required them to take down the games. Similar actions followed shortly on Xbox Live and PlayStation Network for the Xbox 360 and PlayStation 3 versions, also affecting GoldenEye 007: Reloaded. 007 Legends was nominated for Outstanding Achievement in Video Game Writing in the Writers Guild of America Awards.
