= James Bond 007: The Duel =

1992 video game

- European Mega Drive cover art
- Developer: The Kremlin
- Publishers: NA/PAL: Domark; JP: Tengen
- Composer: Matt Furniss
- Series: James Bond
- Platforms: Mega Drive/Genesis; Master System; Game Gear
- Release: Mega Drive/Genesis: UK: December 1992; NA: March 1993; Master System: UK: April 1993; Game Gear: UK: January 1994
- Genre: Action
- Mode: Single-player

James Bond 007: The Duel is an action video game featuring the fictional British intelligence agent James Bond. It was developed by The Kremlin and published by Domark in 1992 for Sega's Mega Drive/Genesis, and then the following years for the Master System video game consoles, and the Game Gear handheld game console. The Mega Drive version was also released in Japan by Tengen on 14 May 1993, under the title known as 007: Shitō (００７(ダブルオーセブン)・死闘, Daburu Ō Sebun: Shitō).

== Gameplay ==
Armed with a pistol, the player controls James Bond through various side-scrolling enemy bases to rescue female hostages and to arm a bomb placed at a strategic point to destroy the base. Along the way, Bond must battle numerous thugs and familiar bosses. The action takes place over five levels. It opens on the docks of a Caribbean island, then moves on to the jungle, an underground power plant inside a volcano and a space shuttle launch pad. In the final level, Bond must defeat Jaws and escape.

== Development ==
The Duel was released three years after Timothy Dalton's last appearance as James Bond (in Licence to Kill), but his likeness is used in the game, most notably the opening screens, thus making it Dalton's last appearance as Bond. It was also the final Bond game to be released by Domark, which had released a series of Bond themed games beginning in 1985 with A View to a Kill.

It was the first Bond game not to be directly based on a movie or novel. Instead, it had an original storyline, albeit one with familiar villains including Jaws and Oddjob. Though The Duel's storyline was not its strong point, it did blaze a trail for the future licence-holders Electronic Arts, half of whose Bond output would be based on original storylines. One previous Bond game, the Delphine-developed The Stealth Affair, included an original storyline but the game was originally based on a generic Bond-style character named John Glames and only had the licence added for its US release.

The Master System version is one of the few games that do not work properly on NTSC systems, although the Master System does not have region lock-out.

== Reception ==
The game received mixed to negative reviews with critics praising its animation but criticising its slow controls and repetitive mission structure. Later, reviews were more negative, and the game has generally been omitted from retrospective lists of the best 007 video games.

Reception

Review scores
Publication	Score		
Publication	Game Gear	Master System	Sega Genesis
Aktueller Software Markt		10/12	
GamePro	4/5		4/5
GamesMaster		75%	60%
Joypad	78/100	82%	
Mean Machines Sega			66%
Player One	57%	75%	
Mega			55%
Mega Force		85%	
MegaTech			52/100
Play Time			72%
Sega Force		84/100	80%
Sega Master Force	65/100	84%	
Sega Power	79%	86%	76%
Sega Pro	70%	78%	
Sega Visions	3/5		
Sega Zone		61/100	88/100
Supersonic		87%	79%

== See also ==
- Outline of James Bond
