= Jaws (James Bond) =

Fictional character in James Bond films

- James Bond character
- Richard Kiel as Jaws
- First appearance: The Spy Who Loved Me (1977)
- Last appearance: 007 Legends (2012)
- Portrayed by: Richard Kiel
- Voiced by: Jan Rabson (James Bond Jr.)

In-universe information
- Affiliation: Karl Stromberg (The Spy Who Loved Me); Hugo Drax (Moonraker); SCUM (James Bond Jr); Nikolai Diavolo (007: Everything or Nothing)
- Classification: Henchman

Jaws is a fictional character in the James Bond franchise. He appears in the films The Spy Who Loved Me (1977) and Moonraker (1979), played by Richard Kiel. Depicted as a henchman in the service of various villains, the character is distinguished by his metal teeth, imposing size, immense strength, and near invulnerability. Jaws is regarded as one of the most iconic characters in the franchise and has been featured in various related media.

== Creation ==
Played by Richard Kiel, the character of Jaws was inspired by Ian Fleming's description of a hoodlum named Sol "Horror" Horowitz in his novel The Spy Who Loved Me. When Horror speaks, he reveals steel-capped teeth. The initial script of The Spy Who Loved Me concluded with Jaws being killed by the shark but, after a rough test screening, Jaws was so well-liked that the scene was changed to have him survive. In the storyboard of the sequence from Moonraker (1979), Jaws appeared with an Emilio Largo-style eyepatch, and a moustache, neither of which were seen in the films.

The character's teeth play a prominent role in the films. Albert R. Broccoli is credited with adding steel teeth to the character for The Spy Who Loved Me. Katharina Kubrick Hobbs designed the teeth as cog-like in shape, as she felt that pointed teeth could have injured Kiel. Broccoli originally hired John Chambers to make the teeth; however, these were not used, as they did not meet Broccoli's standards. Broccoli then sent Kiel to Peter Thomas, a dental technician who worked near Pinewood Studios, to construct the appliances. Kiel stated the props were uncomfortable for him and he could only wear them for less than one minute before gagging. After shooting a scene, the teeth were placed in a plastic container with cotton wool in the bottom of it and the teeth were rinsed with mouthwash before drying for use in the next scene. After the James Bond films, the teeth were taken to an unknown location. In 2002, the teeth were displayed as part of an exhibition at Science Museum, London to commemorate the 40th anniversary of the release of Dr. No.

== Appearances ==
=== In films ===
Jaws first appeared in the 1977 film The Spy Who Loved Me as a henchman to the villain, Karl Stromberg (Curd Jürgens). He was an assassin, and is last seen swimming in the ocean after escaping from the Atlantis city ship on which James Bond (Roger Moore) had killed Stromberg before it was torpedoed and sunk.

In the next film, Moonraker (1979), Jaws is employed by both Bond's unspecified enemy in the pre-credits sequence, and the main villain Hugo Drax (Michael Lonsdale). Jaws is evidently well known among criminals, as Drax is pleased to learn that Jaws is available to hire. In his second appearance Jaws changed from a ruthless and unstoppable killing machine to more of a comedic figure (commencing with the cable car sequence) and he eventually turns against Drax and helps Bond defeat him.

In addition to having steel teeth, Jaws was also gigantic and extremely strong, which forced Bond to be especially inventive while fighting him. In combat during The Spy Who Loved Me, Bond found himself caught in an unbreakable death grip by Jaws, who was about to fatally bite him; Bond escaped by using a broken electric lamp to send an electric shock through the assassin's teeth to stun him. In Moonraker he gains a girlfriend, Dolly (Blanche Ravalec), who is never seen to speak aloud and who is the primary reason for his reformation.

Jaws also has an uncanny ability to survive any misfortune seemingly unscathed and come back to challenge Bond again. In The Spy Who Loved Me, Jaws survives an Egyptian structure's collapse on top of him, being hit by a van, being thrown from a rapidly moving train, sitting in the passenger seat of a car which veers off a cliff in Sardinia and lands in a hut below (to the owner's dismay), a battle underwater with a shark and the destruction of Stromberg's lair. In Moonraker, he survives falling several thousand feet after accidentally disabling his own parachute (he falls through a circus tent and lands in the trapeze net), a crash through a building inside a runaway cable car (where he meets and falls in love with Dolly) and going over Iguazu Falls. After each of these incidents (except the last), he always picks himself up, dusts off his jacket and straightens his tie in a Bond manner and nonchalantly walks away. As Jaws escapes from Drax's disintegrating space station to an escape pod with Dolly; they open a bottle of champagne, and Jaws speaks his only line in the entire franchise: "Well, here's to us." The viewer is later informed that Jaws and Dolly made it back to Earth safely.

In 1979, there were plans to bring Jaws back for a third film. In For Your Eyes Only, Jaws would marry Dolly. However, due to a change in production personnel and a desire to make the films more down-to-earth, the producers chose not to bring Kiel or Jaws back.

==== Novelizations ====
Most of the background information on Jaws comes from Christopher Wood's novelization of the film The Spy Who Loved Me; published as James Bond, the Spy Who Loved Me to differentiate from Ian Fleming's novel. In Wood's version, Jaws' real name is Zbigniew Krycsiwiki. He was born in Poland, the product of a union between the strong man of a traveling circus and the Chief Wardress at the Women's Prison in Kraków. The relationship and subsequent marriage had been a stormy one and, when it broke up, the young Zbigniew stayed with his mother and attended school and subsequently university in Kraków. He grew to a prodigious height, but in temperament he followed his father and was surly and uncooperative, given to sudden outbreaks of violent temper. Because of his size, he commanded a place in the university basketball team, but he was sluggish of reaction and his lack of speed was constantly exposed by more skilful but less physically endowed players. After a failed attempt at a basketball career, Krycsiwiki was arrested by the secret police for having taken part in the (fictitious) "1972 bread riots". While he was imprisoned, the police "beat him with hollow steel clubs encased in thick leather" until they thought he was dead, leaving his jaw broken beyond repair. Krycsiwiki later escaped and stowed aboard one of Stromberg's vessels. Eventually he was caught, but instead of turning him in, Stromberg hired a prestigious doctor to create an artificial jaw. After 14 operations, Krycsiwiki's jaw was restored using steel components that created two rows of terrifying razor-sharp teeth, although Jaws was left mute. Since none of the above is actually mentioned in either movie, this is not necessarily considered canonical, and Wood contradicts his own continuity when one compares his scripts and his novelizations.

In the novelization of The Spy Who Loved Me, Jaws remains attached to the magnet that Bond dips into the tank and is killed, whereas in the film Bond uses it to drop Jaws into the water. "Now both hands were tearing at the magnet, and Jaws twisted furiously like a fish on the hook. As Bond watched in fascinated horror, a relentless triangle streaked up behind the stricken giant. A huge grey force launched itself through the wild water, and two rows of white teeth closed around the threshing flesh."

Also in The Spy Who Loved Me novelization, Wood specifically states that Jaws is a mute. However, though Jaws remains mute in Wood's James Bond and Moonraker novelization, he does speak one word at the near end of the film.

=== Other appearances ===
Jaws appeared in the 1991 animated spin-off James Bond Jr. as a member of the SCUM organization and partner-in-crime of fellow henchman Nick Nack (Jeff Bennett). In the show, Jaws underwent some change in his appearance; he was more muscular, his chin was also metal, and he spoke regularly. He is voiced by Jan Rabson.

Jaws' principal video game appearances are in the 1997 Nintendo 64 game GoldenEye 007 in a bonus mission in which he is a henchman to the deceased Hugo Drax whom Bond needs to defeat, and has multiple appearances in the multi-platform 2004 game James Bond 007: Everything or Nothing as a henchman to Nikolai Diavolo (Willem Dafoe). Both games use Richard Kiel's likeness and voice (grunts and sound effects).

In Everything or Nothing, Jaws is electrocuted and is inside a train that plummets into a canyon. Later he drives a tanker intending to destroy the New Orleans levees, but Bond (Pierce Brosnan) destroys his tanker by sending it off of the Lake Pontchartrain Causeway; Bond exclaiming, "I have a sinking feeling that won't be the last I'll see of him". In a fight on a large lift, in which Jaws is equipped with a flamethrower, Bond shoots the flamethrower backpack which ignites Jaws. Bond then climbs into the cockpit of a plane and ejects his seat as the lift plummets to the ground. When Bond subsequently lands on the remains of the lift, Jaws is nowhere to be found, leaving his fate ambiguous. He cannot be hurt himself, and any players that try to hurt him will be killed almost immediately by him.

Jaws is an unlockable multiplayer character in GoldenEye 007 as well as in James Bond 007: Nightfire, where he is the tallest character in the game, his punches can kill almost instantly, and the character model's teeth are visible at close range. Jaws is a playable multiplayer character in the 2010 remake GoldenEye 007 for the Wii, and in the 2011 re-release GoldenEye 007: Reloaded for the PlayStation 3 and Xbox 360. He is also in the 2012 James Bond game 007 Legends.

Jaws appears in the 1992 Sega Mega Drive/Genesis game James Bond 007: The Duel, where he wanders briefly around a section toward the end of the first stage and defeats the player with one hit. He also serves as the game's final boss. Jaws also appears in the 1998 Game Boy game James Bond 007 as a boss, where Bond must lead him to magnetized pads that will temporarily hold him in place, allowing time for Bond to attack him.

== Cultural impact ==
Jaws was spoofed in Mel Brooks' 1977 film High Anxiety, featuring a hired killer named Braces (played by Rudy De Luca) who is wearing large metal braces on his teeth. An unrelated character named Braces (voiced by William Roberts) from the video games TimeSplitters 2 and TimeSplitters: Future Perfect is also referencing Jaws. The film 2008 Get Smart, which is both a parody of and an homage to the James Bond film series, features a character named Dalip (played by The Great Khali), who looks like Jaws and does his Moonraker stunt of falling from the sky without a parachute and surviving; he also helps the film's protagonists Maxwell Smart (Steve Carell) and Agent 99 (Anne Hathaway) in the end.

Jaws makes a cameo appearance in the animated series Jackie Chan Adventures (episode "Tough Luck"), where he auditions as a prospective henchman for Finn (Adam Baldwin) and gets his steel teeth (which are revealed to be dentures) stuck in a board he bites into. In the final credits sequence of the 1999 film adaptation of Inspector Gadget, Doctor Claw (Rupert Everett)'s assistant Sykes (Mike Hagerty) is shown attending a Minions Anonymous meeting; Richard Kiel, who is billed in the credits as "Famous Big Guy with Metal Teeth", is in attendance. Kiel also played Reace, a very similar character to Jaws (complete with metal teeth), in the 1976 film Silver Streak. In Aces Go Places 3, the 1984 third movie in a James Bond spoof series, Kiel plays a villain named Big G, which resembles Jaws, though he has no metal teeth. The film also features a character played by Tsuneharu Sugiyama who resembles the character Oddjob, another James Bond villain.

In the 2002 French comedy movie Le Boulet, Gary Tiplady portrayed a similar character named Requin The Giant.

MythBusters tested the plausibility of Jaws biting through the steel cable car wire. The model based on the dentures used in the movie had little impact on the steel cable, even with a hydraulic press at ten times human bite strength. Jamie Hyneman then took huge metal pincers and became "Claws", who, as the announcer said, was "meaner than Oddjob, more ferocious than Jaws, taller than Nick Nack, and creepier than Tee Hee." With the metal pincers, he gets through the cord easily.
