= James Bond 007 (1984 video game) =

- Developers: Parker Brothers; Tsukuda Original (SG-1000)
- Publishers: Parker Brothers; Tsukuda Original (SG-1000)
- Programmer: Joe Gaucher
- Series: James Bond
- Platforms: Atari 2600, Atari 5200, Atari 8-bit, ColecoVision, Commodore 64, SG-1000
- Release: Atari 2600, Atari 5200, ColecoVision, Atari 8-bit computers: May 1984
- Genre: Scrolling shooter

James Bond 007 is a horizontally scrolling shooter published in 1984 by Parker Brothers for the Atari 2600, Atari 5200, Atari 8-bit computers, Commodore 64, and ColecoVision. It was developed and published in Japan by Tsukuda Original for the SG-1000 under the title 007 James Bond. It was the first video game based on James Bond to be given a worldwide release.

== Gameplay ==
Gameplay screenshot

The player controls James Bond across four levels. The player is given a multi-purpose vehicle that acts as an automobile, a plane, and a submarine. The vehicle can fire shots and flare bombs, and travels from left to right as the player progresses through each level. The player can shoot or avoid enemies and obstacles that appear throughout the game, including boats, frogmen, helicopters, missiles, and mini-submarines.

The game's four levels are loosely based on missions from James Bond films:

1. Diamonds are Forever (1971): The player rescues Tiffany Case from an oil rig.
2. The Spy Who Loved Me (1977): The player destroys an underwater laboratory.
3. Moonraker (1979): The player destroys satellites.
4. For Your Eyes Only (1981): The player retrieves radio equipment from a sunken boat.

== Development ==
Parker Brothers promoted a James Bond video game titled James Bond Agent 007 at the Summer Consumer Electronics Show in 1982. Charlie Heath worked on a demo version of the game that was based on the final scene in Moonraker, which failed to impress Parker Brothers. Heath left Parker Brothers in late 1982, and no copies of his version exist. The Video Game Update described the game as being "way behind the schedule" as they were still being announced in early 1983. The game was then delayed again until 1984.

Initially set to be a tie-in with the film Octopussy (1983). In 1983, a new version of the game, titled James Bond 007 As Seen in Octopussy, was in development by Western Technologies, with a scheduled release later that summer. It included a train sequence from the film. Western Technologies failed to complete the game, and Parker Brothers subsequently hired On Time Software to create an entirely new game. The lead designer and programmer of the Atari 2600 version of James Bond 007 was Joe Gaucher.

The finished game lost these elements to include segments influenced by other Bond films such as Diamonds Are Forever (1971), The Spy Who Loved Me (1977), Moonraker (1979) and For Your Eyes Only (1981).

James Bond 007 was released in May 1984 by Parker Brothers for the video game consoles Atari 2600, ColecoVision, Atari 5200 and the Atari 8-bit computer line.

== Reception ==
Computer Games gave the Atari 8-bit computer version an "A" rating and noted the "simple" graphics and sound, and the lack of a high-score display, but praised the diversity of the game's missions and weapons, writing that they make the game "an exceptionally challenging shoot-em-up. It's also interesting to have a definite purpose at the end of each mission, instead of simply shooting everything that moves."

In a retrospective review, AllGame's Brett Alan Weiss gave the ColecoVision version two stars out of five. He wrote that the game "has so many flaws that it is easily the worst cartridge in the Parker Brothers library of ColecoVision titles." Weiss criticized the game's sound effects, its difficult controls and gameplay, its short length, and most of its graphics, but wrote that it gradually and briefly becomes enjoyable once the controls have been mastered. In an overview of James Bond video games in Retro Gamer magazine, an anonymous author said that the game was an ambitious first outing, but that was let down due to "frustrating difficulty."

== See also ==
- Outline of James Bond
