= Auric Goldfinger =

Fictional James Bond villain

- James Bond character
- Gert Fröbe as Goldfinger, cheating during a rummy game at Fontainebleau Miami Beach
- First appearance: Goldfinger (1959 novel)
- Last appearance: 007 Legends (2012 video game)
- Created by: Ian Fleming
- Portrayed by: Gert Fröbe
- Voiced by: Michael Collins (film); Jan Rabson (James Bond Jr.); Enn Reitel (GoldenEye: Rogue Agent); Timothy Watson (007 Legends)

In-universe information
- Full name: Auric Goldfinger
- Gender: Male
- Occupation: Jeweller; Metallurgist; Smuggler
- Affiliation: SMERSH (novel); Auric Enterprises Inc. (film); S.C.U.M. (James Bond Jr.); SPECTRE (GoldenEye: Rogue Agent)
- Classification: Villain (Former; regular)
- Henchmen: Oddjob; Pussy Galore; Jill Masterson; Mei-Lei

Auric Goldfinger is a fictional character and the main antagonist in Ian Fleming's 1959 seventh James Bond novel, Goldfinger, and the 1964 film it inspired (the third in the James Bond series). His first name, Auric, is an adjective meaning "of gold". Fleming chose the name to commemorate the architect Ernő Goldfinger, who had built his home in Hampstead next door to Fleming's; he disliked Goldfinger's style of architecture and destruction of Victorian terraces and decided to name a memorable villain after him. According to a 1965 Forbes article and The New York Times, the Goldfinger persona was based on gold-mining magnate Charles W. Engelhard, Jr.

In 2003, the American Film Institute declared Auric Goldfinger the 49th-greatest villain in the past 100 years of film. In a poll on IMDb, Auric Goldfinger was voted the most sinister James Bond villain, beating (in order) Ernst Stavro Blofeld, Dr. Julius No, Max Zorin and Emilio Largo. Goldfinger's oft-quoted line "No, Mr. Bond, I expect you to die," (after Bond asked him while tied to a table in front of a laser, "Do you expect me to talk?") was voted the number-one best moment in the James Bond film franchise in a 2013 Sky Movies poll.

Auric Goldfinger was played by German actor Gert Fröbe. Fröbe, who did not speak English well, was dubbed in the film by Michael Collins, an English actor. In the German version, Fröbe dubbed himself back again.

Goldfinger was banned in Israel after it was revealed that Fröbe had been a member of the Nazi Party. However, he left the party before the outbreak of World War II. After several years, the ban was lifted, as it was found that Fröbe saved the lives of two Jews by hiding them in his basement during the war.

== Novel biography ==
In the novel Goldfinger, Auric Goldfinger is a 42-year-old from Riga, Latvia, who emigrated to Britain in 1937 at the age of 20. He is five feet (1.52 m) tall, has blue eyes, red hair, and a passion for his tan.

Goldfinger's name was borrowed from Ian Fleming's neighbour in his Hampstead home, architect Ernő Goldfinger, and his character bears some resemblance. Ernő Goldfinger consulted his lawyers when the book was published, prompting Fleming to suggest renaming the character "Goldprick", but Goldfinger eventually settled out of court in return for his legal costs, six copies of the novel, and an agreement that the character's first name 'Auric' would always be used. James Bond and Junius Du Pont think that, despite Goldfinger having a typically German-Jewish surname, he is not Jewish; Bond's surmise that he is a Balt proves correct when Goldfinger is revealed to be a Latvian émigré.

Following naturalisation as a British citizen in Nassau, in the Bahamas, Goldfinger has become the richest man in England, although his wealth is not in English banks, nor does he pay taxes on it, as it is spread as gold bullion in many countries. Goldfinger is the treasurer of SMERSH, a Soviet counterintelligence agency, which is Bond's nemesis. Goldfinger fancies himself an expert pistol shot who never misses, and always shoots his opponents through the right eye. He tells Bond at the end of the novel he has done so with four Mafia heads.

Goldfinger is obsessed with gold, going so far as to keep a yellow-bound copy of an erotic novel in his nightstand and have his lovers painted head to toe in gold so that he can make love to gold. (He leaves an area near the spine unpainted, but painting this area also is what kills Jill Masterton, as in the film.) He is also a jeweller, a metallurgist, and a smuggler.

When Goldfinger first meets Bond in Miami, he claims that he is agoraphobic; a ploy to allow him to cheat Junius du Pont, a previous acquaintance of Bond's (from Casino Royale), at a game of two-handed Canasta. Bond figures out how Goldfinger is managing this and blackmails him by forcing him to admit his deception. This incident also establishes Goldfinger as boundlessly greedy, as whatever sums he can gain by this elaborate cheating are negligible compared with what he already has in his possession.

Goldfinger is also an avid golfer, but is known at his club for being a smooth cheater there, also. When Bond contrives to play against Goldfinger with $10,000 at stake, he out-cheats Goldfinger by switching the latter's Dunlop 1 golf ball with a Dunlop 7 he had found while playing. Goldfinger loses the final hole and the match for playing a ball that does not belong to him.

In both the novel and film, Goldfinger is aided in his crimes by his manservant Oddjob, a monstrously strong Korean who ruthlessly eliminates any threat to his employer's affairs.

Goldfinger is the owner of "Enterprises Auric A.G." in Switzerland, maker of metal furniture which is purchased by many airlines, including Air India. Twice a year, Goldfinger drives his vintage Rolls-Royce Silver Ghost car from England to Enterprises Auric. Bond learns that Goldfinger makes dead drops of gold bars for SMERSH along the way, and that his car's bodywork is 18-carat (75%), solid white gold under the ploy that the added weight is armour plating. Once at Enterprises Auric, the bodywork is stripped off, melted and made into airplane seats for a company that Enterprises Auric is heavily invested in. The plane(s) are then flown to India where the seats are melted down again into gold bars and sold for a much higher rate—100 to 200 per cent profit.

=== Operation Grand Slam ===
Goldfinger during "Operation Grand Slam"

In the novel, Goldfinger captures Bond and threatens to cut him in half with a circular saw as Oddjob tortures him using his pressure points. Bond offers to work for Goldfinger in exchange for his life, but Goldfinger refuses to spare him, and he blacks out.

Bond wakes to find that Goldfinger is going to take him up on his offer after all, and makes him his prisoner and secretary. While working at this job, Bond discovers that Goldfinger is plotting to rob the United States Bullion Depository at Fort Knox, Kentucky, in an action codenamed "Operation Grand Slam".

Goldfinger plans to contaminate the water supply at Fort Knox using the nerve agent GB (also known as Sarin), killing everyone at the base. Then, using an atomic bomb designed for an MGM-5 Corporal intermediate-range ballistic missile that he had purchased for US$1 million in Germany, Goldfinger would blow open Fort Knox's impregnable vault, before removing roughly $15 billion in gold bullion by truck and train with the help of American criminal organizations, including the Mafia, the Purple Gang (an organization that existed in real life), the Spangled Mob (a fictional gang featured in the earlier Bond novel Diamonds Are Forever), and the Cement Mixers, an all-female gang led by lesbian and former trapeze artist Pussy Galore. They would then escape to the Soviet Union on a cargo boat. Goldfinger bribes the syndicate leaders with $15,000 in gold apiece to secure their attendance at the meeting and promises that each group will receive at least $1 billion, while he will keep $5 billion. In addition, Goldfinger has promised Bond £1 million in gold once the theft is complete.

Bond foils Goldfinger's plan by writing a note to his American colleague Felix Leiter, containing the details of the impending operation, and taping it to the underside of an airplane toilet seat. Once the note reaches Leiter, he arranges for help from the FBI and the Pentagon. Leiter is able to foil the theft, but Goldfinger escapes.

Later, Goldfinger and his henchmen learn from SMERSH who Bond is and determine to take him with them in defecting to the Soviet Union. They pose as doctors to incapacitate crew and passengers (including Bond) with drugged inoculations. Then they hijack the aircraft and load Goldfinger's three-ton personal bullion hoard onto it. The hijacked airplane is piloted by three German ex-Luftwaffe pilots who work for Goldfinger. Oddjob meets his end when he is sucked through an airliner window after Bond pierces it with a knife. Bond and Goldfinger engage in a brief struggle, during which Bond is seized by a violent rage for the first time in his life, strangling Goldfinger to death with his bare hands. Bond then turns to the pilots and forces the airplane to turn back from its intended flight path, causing it to ditch in the ocean after running out of fuel. The weight of Goldfinger's gold causes the airplane to sink rapidly, taking his body and his pilots down with it. Only Bond and Pussy Galore, both wearing lifejackets, appear in the ocean and are soon picked up, as the only survivors.

==== Criticism of novel's plan and changes made in filmed version ====
After publication of the novel, the details of "Operation Grand Slam" were questioned, with critics noting it would have taken hours, if not days, to remove $15 billion from Fort Knox, during which the U.S. Army would have inevitably intervened. The issue of getting every soldier on the base to drink the poisoned water without an alarm was also raised. A final problem was the "clean" atomic bomb, tactical or not, which in all likelihood would have annihilated the vault instead of breaking it open. The novel itself has a scene where Bond points out to Goldfinger several reasons why the plan could not possibly work, and Goldfinger responds only with a vague assurance that he has prepared solutions for these problems.

Consequently, the filmed version of the novel altered the details of the plan. Although Bond initially believes that Goldfinger intends to steal the bullion, he soon realizes that the true plan is to set off a Chinese-supplied dirty bomb within the vault. The explosion will irradiate the gold and render it unusable for decades, crippling the gold standard–based economy and greatly increasing the value of Goldfinger's personal bullion holdings. During this conversation, Bond points out the logistical flaws in the theft as set out in the original novel.

== Film biography ==
In the film, Auric Goldfinger (Gert Fröbe) is a successful businessman, owning many properties throughout the world, including "Auric Enterprises, AG" in Switzerland and a stud-farm in Kentucky called "Auric Stud". However, Goldfinger's real business is that of internationally smuggling gold, using the method of having a car (precisely, a Rolls-Royce Phantom III) built with gold body castings and transporting it via airplane before having the bodywork re-smelted once it arrives at its destination. After Goldfinger's business affairs come under suspicion from the Bank of England, Bond is sent to investigate.

In the film, Felix Leiter (Cec Linder) says that Goldfinger is "British, but he doesn't sound like it"; however, this may simply mean he possesses British citizenship, as by his accent he is probably German by birth. Fröbe was chosen to play the villain because producers Harry Saltzman and Albert R. Broccoli had seen his performance in a 1958 German thriller titled It Happened in Broad Daylight, based on the story The Pledge: Requiem for the Detective Novel by Friedrich Dürrenmatt. In that film, Fröbe played a serial killer named Schrott, who kills children to vent his frustrations with his domineering wife Frau Schrott (Berta Drews). Broccoli and Saltzman had seen the movie and decided upon the "big bad German" for the role.

In the film, Goldfinger, an avid golfer, reveals a fascination with Nazi gold when Bond (Sean Connery) tempts him to bet £5,000 against a lost, historical Nazi gold bar, an incident not in the novel (the golf game is played for $10,000). Goldfinger cheats with help from Oddjob (Harold Sakata), but Bond figures out the deception and tricks him into playing the wrong ball on the last hole, costing him the match. Goldfinger is shown to take sadistic pleasure in killing his enemies, which he accomplishes in elaborate ways. This is shown when he attempts to kill a captured Bond by slowly cutting him in half with a laser (but is talked out of it by Bond) and, later, when he uses nerve gas to execute a group of gangsters he had invited to his ranch.

Initially Goldfinger makes it appear that his plan is to rob Fort Knox, but when Bond reveals to Goldfinger that this is impossible because it would take 2 weeks, 200 trucks and 60 men to steal the gold before the authorities find out and force him to return the gold, when Goldfinger denies planning to steal the gold, Bond begins to connect the dots and concludes that Goldfinger's real plan is to detonate a small dirty bomb (helped by Mr. Ling (Burt Kwouk), a Communist Chinese nuclear fission specialist) within the gold bullion depository at Fort Knox. The explosion will render the gold radioactive and unusable for 58 years, increasing the value of his own gold and giving the Chinese an advantage resulting from the ensuing economic chaos. Bond, at this point held captive by Goldfinger, is able to smuggle the details of the operation out to his CIA associate Felix Leiter and, taken along on the operation by Goldfinger, ultimately thwarts the operation by defusing the atomic device.

With Fort Knox safe, Bond is invited to the White House for a meeting with the President. However, with his pilot Pussy Galore (Honor Blackman), Goldfinger hijacks the plane carrying Bond. In a struggle for Goldfinger's revolver, Bond shoots out a window, causing an explosive decompression. Goldfinger is sucked out of the cabin through the window. With the plane out of control, Bond rescues Galore before parachuting to safety with her from the aircraft.

== Appearances in other media ==
- Hanna-Barbera parodied Goldfinger numerous times, particularly with the Secret Squirrel villain Yellow Pinkie (voiced by Paul Frees) and Goldflipper (voiced by Jim Cummings).
- Goldfinger appears in the 1991 animated series James Bond Jr. voiced by Jan Rabson. In this show, he has a teenaged daughter, Goldie Finger (voiced by Kath Soucie), who is as greedy and ruthless as her father. He refers to specific elements of the original film, establishing continuity, though his survival is not explained.
- Goldfinger is parodied in the 2002 comedy film Austin Powers in Goldmember as the titular Dutch villain (Mike Myers), whose trademark was to paint his enemies' genitalia gold, for he himself lost his genitalia in an "unfortunate smelting incident".
- Los Angeles ska-punk band Goldfinger took its name from the character.
- Goldfinger and Oddjob are referenced in The New Traveller's Almanac that appears in the back of The League of Extraordinary Gentlemen, Volume II comic book.
- Auric Goldfinger and Oddjob are multiplayer characters in the 2002 video game Nightfire. They are brought back to life and their likenesses are used in the 2004 Electronic Arts video game GoldenEye: Rogue Agent. In the game, Goldfinger (voiced by Enn Reitel) recruits the protagonist, GoldenEye, a former secret agent ousted by MI6. Goldfinger is also an ally of Francisco Scaramanga (voiced by Christopher Lee), the villain of The Man with the Golden Gun and the SPECTRE organisation. In the game, Goldfinger's scientists develop what is considered to be the deadliest weapon known to mankind: the OMEN (Organic Mass Energy Neutraliser), and plan to use it against Dr. Julius No (modeled after Joseph Wiseman and voiced by Carlos Alazraqui)'s forces. He is killed when, after having betrayed GoldenEye and Scaramanga and taken over his volcano lair, GoldenEye and Scaramanga make use of a computer virus to overload the OMEN.
- Goldfinger also makes a minor appearance as an unlockable character in the multiplayer mode of 2005 video game From Russia with Love.
- Auric Goldfinger came 10th place in the 2002 Forbes Fictional 15.
- Goldfinger also appears in the 2012 video game 007 Legends during the Goldfinger levels, voiced by Timothy Watson.
- Goldfinger and Operation Grand Slam are referenced in the 2016 Stuart Gibbs novel Spy Ski School. The villains attempt to corner the market on molybdenum by buying or nuking all of the areas where it's mined. As a tribute to Goldfinger, their plan is named Operation Golden Fist.
- Goldfinger was voiced on BBC Radio 4's adaptation of Goldfinger by Sir Ian McKellen in 2010.

Preceded by Rosa Klebb	James Bond Villain	Succeeded by Emilio Largo
