= Pussy Galore =

Character from the James Bond series

- James Bond character
- Honor Blackman as Pussy Galore
- First appearance: Goldfinger (1959 novel)
- Last appearance: Trigger Mortis (2015 novel)
- Created by: Ian Fleming
- Portrayed by: Honor Blackman

In-universe information
- Affiliation: Auric Goldfinger (film); The Cement Mixers (novel)
- Classification: Bond girl / Henchwoman

Pussy Galore is a fictional character in the 1959 Ian Fleming James Bond novel Goldfinger and the 1964 film of the same name. In the film, she is played by Honor Blackman. The character returns in the 2015 Bond continuation novel Trigger Mortis by Anthony Horowitz, set in the 1950s, two weeks after the events of Goldfinger.

Blanche Blackwell, a Jamaican of Anglo-Jewish descent, is thought to have been the love of Fleming's later life and his model for Pussy Galore.

== Appearances ==
=== Fleming novel ===
In Ian Fleming's 1959 novel Goldfinger, Pussy Galore is the only woman in the United States known to be running an organized crime gang. Initially trapeze artists, her group of performing catwomen, "Pussy Galore and her Abrocats", is unsuccessful, so the women train as cat burglars instead.

Her group evolves into an all-lesbian organization, based in Harlem, known as the Cement Mixers. In the novel, she has black hair, pale skin, and the only violet eyes that James Bond has ever seen. She is in her 30s, and her voice is low and attractive. Born into poverty in the rural Southern United States, she fell into juvenile delinquency. Attempting to go straight, she joined the circus and became an acrobat. Pussy tells Bond that she became a lesbian after she was sexually abused by her uncle at the age of 12.

Auric Goldfinger enlists the help of Pussy and her Cement Mixers to carry out "Operation Grand Slam", a scheme to kill all the soldiers guarding Fort Knox by poisoning their water supply with a water-borne nerve agent (GB, also called sarin), and then to use a nuclear weapon to make the one billion dollars of gold in the United States Bullion Depository radioactive, which will vastly increase the value of his gold holdings. Goldfinger chooses the Cement Mixers because he needs a group of women to impersonate the nurses in the fake emergency medical teams he plans to send into the poison-stricken Fort Knox.

After Bond and Felix Leiter foil "Grand Slam", Galore runs into Bond while impersonating a stewardess on Goldfinger's hijacked escape flight to the Soviet Union (which carries his remaining fortune in gold). Bond, having previously been drugged by a fake vaccination, has been kidnapped and transported onto the plane to join Goldfinger, who is determined to kill him.

However, Bond punctures one of the aircraft's windows with a knife (causing Goldfinger's henchman Oddjob to be blown out and plunge to his death), then tackles Goldfinger, and in the ensuing struggle, kills him. Bond then forces the crew of the plane to reverse course. When the gold-heavy craft runs out of fuel, and the crew must ditch it in the ocean, Bond and Pussy are the only ones who manage to escape into a life raft. The end of the novel hints that Pussy is sent to prison, as she says to Bond, "Will you write to me in Sing Sing?"

Her original Amazonian catwomen appear as characters in the film, but as small-aircraft aerobatic pilots rather than trapeze artists.

=== Authorized sequel by Anthony Horowitz ===
The character returned in Trigger Mortis a 2013 novel by Anthony Horowitz, authorized by the Fleming estate. The story takes place in the 1950s, two weeks after the events of Goldfinger. It contains previously unreleased material by Fleming.

=== Film ===
In the film, Pussy Galore (Honor Blackman) is first seen when James Bond (Sean Connery) wakes up in Auric Goldfinger's (Gert Fröbe) private jet, having been knocked out with a tranquiliser gun by Kisch (Michael Mellinger), a Goldfinger henchman. He is lying on a couch when he regains consciousness, and since the first thing he sees when he opens his eyes is her stunning blonde-framed visage leaning over him, the dialogue runs as follows:

James Bond: "Who are you?"
Pussy Galore: "My name is Pussy Galore."
James Bond: "I must be dreaming."

Galore is the leader of Pussy Galore's Flying Circus, a group of women aviators connected with Goldfinger's "Operation Grand Slam" (played in certain scenes by stuntmen in blonde wigs). In a later scene, Galore uses judo to attack Bond after she catches him eavesdropping on Goldfinger's plan, and turns him over to Goldfinger. However, Bond corners Galore in a barn and forcibly holds her down and kisses her. She initially tries to fight him off, but as he overpowers her, she eventually succumbs. She then secretly turns against Goldfinger; she alerts the Central Intelligence Agency to her employer's scheme, and they help her replace the deadly nerve gas that Goldfinger is planning to have her aviators spray over Fort Knox with a different, harmless substance.

Having foiled Goldfinger's plan, Bond boards the President's private plane to travel to the White House. Goldfinger, now a fugitive, forces Galore to participate in hijacking the plane to force the pilot to fly him to Cuba. However, Bond defeats Goldfinger by shooting out the plane's window and causing him to be sucked out of the plane at high altitude and to plunge to his death. Bond then saves Galore from the crashing plane: they both bailout and land safely in an unidentified tropical region, and are presumed to have sex under their parachute.

== Reception ==
Pussy ranked second in a poll of favourite Bond girls by Entertainment Weekly in 2007, beaten only by Ursula Andress's character Honey Ryder from Dr. No (1962). Yahoo! Movies had her name included in the 2012 list of the best Bond girl names, calling it "The most famous Bond Girl name, and also the rudest – U.S. censors almost cut it from Goldfinger."

Elisabeth Ladenson wrote that she is one of "two memorable lesbians" from Fleming's Bond novels (the other being Rosa Klebb).

== In popular culture ==
The 1997 parody film Austin Powers: International Man of Mystery features a character named Alotta Fagina (Fabiana Udenio), in an apparent reference to Galore and other Bond girls with salacious names.

The Rolex GMT-Master reference 6542 is nicknamed "Pussy Galore", as the movie character wears this particular watch.

== Bibliography ==
- Lindner, Christoph (2009). The James Bond Phenomenon: a Critical Reader. Manchester University Press. ISBN 978-0-7190-6541-5.
