= IT News Africa =

South African news website

- Screenshot
- Website type: News and reviews
- Available in: English
- Website: http://www.itnewsafrica.com/
- Launched: 2007
- Current status: Active

IT News Africa is a Johannesburg-based technology news website. It focuses on news surrounding information and telecommunications (ICT), broadband, IT security, software, gadgets and gaming, and mobile operators from across Africa. IT News Africa also produces the bi-monthly Innovation Dinner, a gathering of senior-level executives from the ICT industry across Africa hosted with the partnership of IBM; and is the publisher of the African Innovator Magazine.

== Interviews ==
Being a news and information website, IT News Africa has conducted interviews with several high-profile executives in the African ICT industry, such as Samsung's Managing Director For South Africa, Nigeria's Communications Commission's Executive Commissioner, MTN's CEO Sifiso Dabengwa, and SAP's President Of Europe, Middle East And Africa.

== Innovation Dinner ==
IT News Africa is responsible for producing the bi-monthly Innovation Dinner series, which brings together senior-level executives from various ICT companies from across Africa to network and discuss the event's pre-determined topic. The event was first hosted in South Africa, but has since expanded into Nigeria and Kenya. On average, the dinner is attended by 90 invited-only guests which has included in the past executives from Hewlett-Packard, MTN, Ericsson, Motorola, Dimension Data and Huawei.

== African Innovator Magazine ==
IT News Africa is the sole publisher of the African Innovator Magazine, with its inaugural issue to be launched in 2012. The magazine will have a strong focus on innovation on the African continent, and spans a number of industries including mHealth, ICT, telecommunications and gadgets, as well as having in-depth articles and profiles on leading figures in the various industries.
