= Oddjob =

Fictional character from the James Bond film series

- James Bond character
- Harold Sakata as Oddjob in Goldfinger (1964).
- First appearance: Goldfinger (novel, 1959)
- Last appearance: 007 Legends (video game, 2012)
- Created by: Ian Fleming
- Portrayed by: Harold Sakata
- Voiced by: Jeff Bennett (James Bond Jr.)

In-universe information
- Gender: Male
- Affiliation: Auric Goldfinger
- Nationality: Korean
- Classification: Henchman

Oddjob (often written as "Odd Job") is a fictional character in the espionage novels and films featuring James Bond. He is a henchman to the villain Auric Goldfinger in Ian Fleming's 1959 James Bond novel Goldfinger and its 1964 film adaptation. In the film, Oddjob was played by the Japanese-American actor and professional wrestler Harold Sakata. Oddjob, who also appears in the James Bond Jr. animated series and in several video games, is one of the most popular characters in the Bond series.

== Appearances ==
=== Novel ===
In the 1959 novel Goldfinger, Oddjob's real name is unknown. Auric Goldfinger names him to describe his duties to his employer. A Korean, like all of Goldfinger's staff, he is extremely powerful, as shown in one sequence where he breaks the thick oak railing of a staircase with karate chops and shatters a mantel with his foot. When James Bond expresses surprise at these feats, Goldfinger explains that Oddjob trains extensively to toughen the striking surfaces of his hands and feet, which have developed a tough callus, significantly increasing his striking power.

Oddjob is described as being a "squat" man with "arms like thighs", black teeth, and a "sickly zoo-smell". He is over six feet (1.8 m) tall, as the novel describes his breaking of a mantelpiece that was "about seven feet [2.1 m] off the ground — six inches [150 mm] higher than the top of the Korean's bowler hat." In an early edition, Oddjob is described as having a black belt in the Japanese martial art of karate; in later editions it is learned that Oddjob practised taekwondo and hapkido in his native Korea but went on to earn his black belt in karate in Japan. The earlier novel tells of his hatred of being mistaken for Japanese, mainly due to Korean anger at the Japanese occupation of Korea (1910–1945). He particularly enjoys eating cats, a taste acquired during a famine in Korea when he was young, and relishes the chance to have one for dinner during Bond's visit to Goldfinger's estate.

Oddjob's signature weapon is a razor-edged bowler hat, which he wears at all times and can throw with deadly accuracy. He is also a skilled archer, able to fire an arrow through a ring as it is held aloft. Due to a cleft palate, he has a speech defect that renders his speech unintelligible to everyone except Goldfinger. In addition to killing people who might cause trouble for Goldfinger, Oddjob functions as his guard, chauffeur, and manservant (though not his golf caddy, as depicted in the film).

He is killed when Bond uses a knife to shatter the window next to his seat on an aircraft, which depressurizes the plane and blows Oddjob out of the window. In the film version, this fate was instead given to Auric Goldfinger.

=== Film ===
At the beginning of the 1964 film Goldfinger, Oddjob (Harold Sakata) is seen only as a silhouette against a wall as he knocks James Bond (Sean Connery) unconscious at the Fontainebleau Hotel, after which he or Goldfinger kills Bond girl Jill Masterson (Shirley Eaton), with whom Bond had spent the night, through "skin suffocation" by painting her entire body with gold paint.

When Bond meets Auric Goldfinger (Gert Fröbe) for a round of golf, Oddjob is seen in full for the first time. Goldfinger describes him as "an admirable manservant but mute". He speaks only four times in the film: in his first line, upon pretending to have found Goldfinger's missing golf ball, he exclaims, "Aha!". The second time, after killing Tilly Masterson (Tania Mallet), he instructs his men to dispose of her body by merely pointing at them and saying, "Ah! Ah!". The third time, he says "Ah!" to order Bond to put on a gas mask before entering Fort Knox. The fourth time, as Bond electrocutes him in Fort Knox, he yells a final long, loud "Arrgh!".

Oddjob acts as Goldfinger's personal chauffeur, bodyguard, and golf caddy. He wears a bowler hat with a sharpened steel rim, using it as a lethal throwing weapon. It is powerful and capable of cutting through steel and decapitating a stone statue. He uses it to kill Tilly Masterson by breaking her neck.

Physically, Oddjob is extremely strong and resilient: he crushes a golf ball with one hand, and during the climactic fight scene with Bond, he is struck in the chest by a thrown gold bar and in the head with a wooden object used as a club. He barely flinches after both these attacks. He is also fanatically loyal to Goldfinger and his plot, as he is willing to die in the nuclear explosion in Fort Knox rather than allow the bomb's disarmament. After being locked in the vault with Goldfinger's henchman Kisch (Michael Mellinger), Oddjob kills Kisch to prevent him from disarming the bomb before engaging Bond.

Oddjob's demeanor remains constant throughout the film. He smiles broadly whenever he encounters Bond, even during their fight scene. The only time he shows anything resembling fear or wariness is when Bond attempts to use Oddjob's hat against him. Oddjob dodges the hat, which hits metal bars and sticks there. As Oddjob retrieves his hat, Bond touches the bars with an electric cable cut loose earlier in the fight. Oddjob is electrocuted and dies. Bond later remarks to Felix Leiter (Cec Linder), "he blew a fuse".

=== Other appearances ===
Oddjob (voiced by Jeff Bennett) appears in the 1991 animated series James Bond Jr. with a miniature top hat (in place of the customary bowler hat), sunglasses, and hip-hop style clothes (not only does he wear purple instead of black, but he wears more casual attire as opposed to his live-action counterpart's dress suit), revealing that the electric shock did not kill him, but knocked him unconscious. The Americans arrest him before he escapes again in the series. When not wearing his hat, his hair is now more flat-top. Like his movie counterpart, he rarely speaks.

In the 1998 video game James Bond 007, Oddjob appears as a henchman for the main villain, General Golgov. Bond encounters Oddjob at his hotel room in Marrakesh. The two fight and Bond is defeated and left stranded in a desert. Later on, Bond trails Oddjob to Tibet, only to be captured. Bond escapes confinement and obtains a shield to protect him from Oddjob's hats, which he uses to deflect back at him. In this game, Oddjob speaks.

In the 2004 video game GoldenEye: Rogue Agent, Oddjob is a henchman of Goldfinger (Enn Reitel) and initially a companion of GoldenEye. He is killed when GoldenEye tosses him over a rail into a pit inside the Hoover Dam after he attacks GoldenEye.

Oddjob appears in the James Bond video games GoldenEye 007 (1997) and James Bond 007: Nightfire (2002) as a playable character for use in multiplayer modes. In Nightfire, he can use his hat as a throwing weapon that returns after 30 seconds. Oddjob is also a playable multiplayer character in the 2010 remake game GoldenEye 007 and appeared in the 2012 video game 007 Legends.

In Dynamite Entertainment's ongoing comic book title James Bond 007, a new iteration of Oddjob is featured who is envisioned as a South Korean secret agent and a successor to another Oddjob (with Harold Sakata's likeness), initially acting as a rival spy to Bond in a mutual assignment. His given name is John Lee.

== Oddjob's hat ==
The prop used in Goldfinger by Oddjob was made by British hat makers Lock & Co. The hat was then adapted by inserting a chakram into the brim. John Stears was responsible for making the hat fly.

After Goldfinger, the hat came into the possession of the James Bond Fan Club. In 1998, the hat was auctioned at Christie's in a sale of James Bond memorabilia. The hat sold for £62,000, equivalent to £120,300 in 2025. In 2002, the hat was lent out for an exhibition at the National Museum of Photography, Film and Television in Bradford, commemorating the 40th anniversary of the release of Dr. No. The hat was then auctioned again in 2006, when the final price was US$36,000, equivalent to US$57,500 in 2025.

Replicas of the hat are sought after by collectors and replicas have been used as centrepieces for some exhibitions. In 2008, one replica joined the Bond exhibition at the National Motor Museum.

The television show MythBusters tested out the capabilities of Oddjob's hat, testing whether or not it would have been able to decapitate a stone statue. It failed to do so, and the Mythbusters ultimately labeled it 'Busted'.

Oddjob's lethal hat was ranked tenth in a 2008 20th Century Fox poll for the most popular movie weapon, which surveyed approximately 2,000 films fans.

== Legacy ==
Oddjob's popularity has resulted in numerous popular culture references and homages. In the Mortal Kombat video game franchise, recurring character Kung Lao's throwable hat was inspired by Oddjob. A parody version called Random Task (Joe Son) appears in the 1997 film Austin Powers: International Man of Mystery, who throws his shoe instead. In the 2008 Bollywood film Chandni Chowk to China, the antagonist Hojo (played by Gordon Liu) uses his bowler hat just like Oddjob.
