= Societal attitudes towards women =

Social attitudes towards women vary as greatly as the members of society themselves. From culture to culture, perceptions about women and related gender expectations differ greatly. In recent years, there has been a great shift in attitudes towards women globally as society critically examines the role that women should play, and the value that women have.

== Attitude towards women scale ==
The Attitude Towards Women Scale was created in 1972 by Dr. Janet T. Spence and Dr. Robert Helmreich. This scale consisted of 55 items that gauged attitudes of American undergraduate college students, both male and female, towards gender roles.

Since 1970, both men and women have demonstrated a more liberal attitude, meaning they perceive the role of women as more equal to that of man than they did in 1970. Culture is suggestive of how students will respond, with Southern students more likely to reflect a more traditional or conservative attitude. The scale has received criticism in that it evaluates attitudes towards equal rights for women rather than just the participants' feelings towards women.

== Historical influences on attitudes towards women ==
Women and family

One of the most profound differences between men and women is the role each plays in reproduction. Menstruation and gestation have historically influenced and limited the role that women played in society. In some societies, a woman's value was measured in her ability to bear children, and raising children became the focus of many women's lives. However, in the twentieth century, these issues have been alleviated by several factors. First, a shift from an agrarian to an industrial society meant that people began having children at much lower rates, and women played an increasingly important role in the labor force. Secondly, advocates for contraception, such as Margaret Sanger, transformed the lives of women everywhere by giving them control over when and how often they would give birth. Gradually, these changes led to a shift in attitude where women were viewed as an integral part of the workforce and began to gain equality with men.

Women gained substantial respect in the workforce and increased participation in education in the last decades of the 20th century. Even still, a 1991 study employing data from the 1988 International Social Survey Program (ISSP) showed both men and women in West Germany, Great Britain and the United States preferred a primary familial role for women when they have young children.
