= James Bond 007: Agent Under Fire =

2001 video game

- Developer: EA Redwood Shores (Note: Additional work by EA Canada. Ported to Xbox by Savage Entertainment.)
- Publisher: Electronic Arts
- Series: James Bond
- Engine: id Tech 3
- Platforms: PlayStation 2, GameCube, Xbox
- Release: PlayStation 2: NA: 13 November 2001; EU: 30 November 2001; GameCube: NA: 12 March 2002; EU: 14 June 2002; Xbox: NA: 26 March 2002; EU: 14 June 2002
- Genre: First-person shooter
- Modes: Single-player, multiplayer

James Bond 007: Agent Under Fire is a 2001 first-person shooter video game developed by EA Redwood Shores and published by Electronic Arts for PlayStation 2, GameCube, and Xbox. It originally began development as a PlayStation 2 and PC game based on the 1999 James Bond film The World Is Not Enough. However, the game was delayed and eventually reworked into Agent Under Fire, featuring an original Bond storyline that is unrelated to the films. Playing as Bond, the player must thwart an attempt to replace world leaders with clones.

Agent Under Fire was released for PlayStation 2 in November 2001, followed by the other versions in March 2002. The game received "mixed or average" reviews, according to Metacritic.

== Gameplay ==
Agent Under Fire features over fifteen different types of firearms, as well as other weapons. Each firearm is based on a real firearm, but is given a pseudonym, the same manner as the weapons in GoldenEye 007, and The World is Not Enough. Most of the gadgets are concealed in a mobile phone, including a decryptor, grapple, laser, and remote transmitter. Bond is also provided with a card that disrupts electronic signals, as well as a jetpack. During the game, players may encounter opportunities to utilize the level's environment or their gadgets to dispatch enemies, clear obstacles, or open up alternative pathways; doing so awards the player a "Bond Moment" which contributes to the player's end-of-level score.

The multiplayer mode in Agent Under Fire features up to four players, with several unique arenas to host multiplayer battles in. The multiplayer games can also be played with one player against an AI player.

== Plot ==
CIA agent Zoe Nightshade, a mole in the Hong Kong-based botanical research firm Identicon Corporation, is discovered and captured while investigating Identicon as a possible front for a weapons-smuggling ring. MI6 Agent James Bond infiltrates the Identicon facility in an attempt to rescue her, as well as retrieve a suspicious courier case in the same building. After rescuing Nightshade from a submarine set to launch, the pair flee the facility with the courier case. Nigel Bloch, the head of Identicon, has his henchmen chase the agents through the streets of Hong Kong. The two steal a second case of vials from a nearby Identicon factory, then rendezvous with R, who provides Bond with a gadget-laden BMW Z8. A limousine pulls up, and a figure inside fires a rocket at the agents, killing Nightshade, and steals the case. Bond pursues in his new car, stopping an armoured van containing the stolen vials.

The vials contained nine blood samples, eight of which contained the blood of world leaders. The ninth one contains the blood of Reginald Griffin, a British diplomat serving at the British embassy in Bucharest, Romania, who is obsessed with protecting a room, that is outside his jurisdiction, in the embassy. Bond investigates the embassy. In the office, he finds Griffin dead, before a man, identical to Griffin, confronts him. After overcoming him, Bond finds a message from Bloch on Griffin's computer that mentions Malprave Industries, based in Switzerland. Bond takes the information from the computer and escapes from the embassy.

At the Malprave Industries' branch in Switzerland, Bond poses as a journalist and notices that a woman he encountered at the embassy is the company's CEO: Adrian Malprave. Knowing that she will recognise him, he plans an escape. After collecting evidence, he makes his escape from the facility. Analysis of the computer message from Romania mentions "Defective Merchandise", believed to be a code name for Dr. Natalya Damescu, formerly an employee of Malprave, now under protection at the British Embassy in Bucharest, the same one in which Griffin was serving as a diplomat. She also has inside information to offer. Carla the Jackal, an infamous terrorist who also killed Zoe in Hong Kong, leads a raid on the embassy. Bond fights the terrorists before running into Damescu. After a confrontation with the Jackal, Bond kills her and picks up a data chip on something known as "Poseidon".

The data chip leads Bond to an oil rig located in the South China Sea. After running into Bloch, Bond follows him into Poseidon, an underwater base devoted to cloning. After seemingly killing Bloch and destroying his lab, Bond escapes the complex by climbing onto a submarine bound for a Royal Navy aircraft carrier in the Mediterranean. Onboard the submarine, Bond finds Zoe, still alive, and she reveals that the woman he "saved" from the Identicon facility was actually a clone meant to gain information from Bond on what MI6 knew about Poseidon and then to infiltrate the CIA. The Jackal had intended to kill Bond.

Depending on whether or not the player picked up a verification code, Bond and Zoe are either captured and taken to the brig, or have a sexual encounter as the submarine is automatically piloted to the aircraft carrier. In either case, the pair investigate the ship. It is discovered that eight world leaders have been cloned, and are to be replaced by Malprave-loyal duplicates. Bond destroys the craft carrying the clones, and the pair make their escape from the carrier. They head back to the Malprave Industries building in the Swiss Alps, where Bond successfully rescues the eight world leaders. Before he can escape from the base, however, Bond encounters Malprave, who has set the base to self-destruct. She also reveals that Bloch is still alive and that Bond had merely killed his clone. After a firefight with him, Bond follows Bloch into Malprave's main office and shoots him with a rocket launcher, sending him crashing through a stained-glass window to his death. Just as Bond manages to leap free of the base before it explodes, Malprave appears and tries to jump clear too, but is consumed by the blast and ultimately killed. Bond lands on a military aircraft being commandeered by Zoe, and together they escape the smoldering base.

== Development and release ==
Agent Under Fire originally began development as a PlayStation 2 (PS2) and PC game based on the 1999 Bond film The World Is Not Enough (TWINE). The game would include 10 large levels, featuring a combination of stealth and action gameplay similar to the 1997 Bond game GoldenEye. The game would feature boating, skiing, and casino levels, and the player would have access to 20 gadgets throughout the game. Players would have multiple ways to complete a mission, with interactive environments playing a role. Multiplayer would be a prominent part of the game.

Electronic Arts (EA) was developing the game, which would run on the id Tech 3 game engine, commonly known as Quake III Arena. It was initially scheduled to release in late 2000, subsequently changed to late 2001. However, EA announced in February 2001 that it was delaying the game until the following year. The delay would allow the company to achieve its vision of a game that would be noticeably different from the Nintendo 64 and PlayStation version of The World Is Not Enough. Two months later, EA announced that The World Is Not Enough had instead been reworked into a new Bond game with an original storyline, under the title James Bond 007 in...Agent Under Fire. It also uses the Quake engine, as well as the Electronic Arts Graphics Library engine.

Jon Horsley of EA said, "We thought we could deliver a good TWINE game for the PS2--but we also thought we could combine forces with some of our other studios and deliver a great original Bond experience with Agent Under Fire. The extra time has provided us the opportunity to create an entirely new game, not tied to a specific movie, and address some points that we knew we couldn't get into TWINE under that timeline". EA worked with MGM and Danjaq to create the game's storyline, and EA Canada developed the game's driving levels, after previously working on EA's Need for Speed series. The developers played previous Bond games as research.

The game features some returning characters from the films, but without using the actors' likenesses. John Cleese appeared in a commercial for the game, reprising his role as R. However, he and other actors from the films did not reprise their roles for the game itself, which instead used sound-alike voice actors. R was originally modeled after Cleese, but his likeness was removed from the final game. CGI companies, such as Industrial Light & Magic and Pacific Data Images, worked on the game's cinematic cutscenes.

The PS2 version was completed on 31 October 2001, and shipped to North American retailers on 13 November, followed by a European release on 30 November. Versions for the GameCube and Xbox were announced shortly thereafter. The GameCube version features the addition of bot players in the multiplayer mode. It was released in North America on 12 March 2002, followed by the Xbox version at the end of the month. Both versions released in Europe on 14 June 2002.

In 2003, a hacker discovered a method to make the Xbox run Linux software, using a copy of Agent Under Fire.

== Reception ==
Reception

Aggregate score
| Aggregator | Score |
|---|---|
| Metacritic | (GC) 74/100 (PS2) 72/100 (Xbox) 71/100 |

Review scores
| Publication | Score |
|---|---|
| AllGame | 3.5/5 |
| Edge | 5/10 |
| Electronic Gaming Monthly | (Xbox) 5.17/10 (PS2) 4.83/10 |
| Eurogamer | (PS2) 7/10 (Xbox) 6/10 |
| Game Informer | 9.25/10 |
| GamePro | 4/5 (PS2) 3.5/5 |
| GameRevolution | C+ |
| GameSpot | 6.8/10 |
| GameSpy | (GC) 80% (PS2) 75% (Xbox) 65% |
| GameZone | (GC) 8.7/10 (PS2) 8/10 |
| IGN | (PS2) 7.9/10 (GC) 7.7/10 (Xbox) 7.6/10 |
| Nintendo Power | 3.6/5 |
| Official U.S. PlayStation Magazine | 4/5 |
| Official Xbox Magazine (US) | 7.9/10 |
| The Cincinnati Enquirer | 4/5 (PS2) 3.5/5 |
| Maxim | 3/5 |

James Bond 007: Agent Under Fire received "mixed or average" reviews, according to review aggregator Metacritic. It was a runner-up for GameSpot's annual "Most Disappointing Game" award among console games, but lost to Luigi's Mansion.

The Cincinnati Enquirer gave the PlayStation 2 version three-and-a-half stars out of five and called it "Slick, sexy and jam-packed with action — but this adventure is short with limited playability over time, except perhaps for its multiplayer modes." However, it later gave the other two versions a score of four stars out of five. FHM gave the PS2 version three stars out of five, stating, "There is the usual mix of chick[s], cars and guns to keep even the most special of agents happy." Maxim also gave the PS2 version six out of ten and stated that "At last you'll infiltrate the secret lair, where you'll discover…you've been playing a very standard-issue game."

By July 2006, the PlayStation 2 version of Agent Under Fire had sold 1.5 million copies and earned $58 million (~$86.6 million in 2024) in the United States. Next Generation ranked it as the 30th highest-selling game launched for the PlayStation 2, Xbox or GameCube between January 2000 and July 2006 in that country. Combined sales of James Bond console games released in the 2000s reached 4 million units in the United States by July 2006. The PlayStation 2 version also received a "Platinum" sales award from the Entertainment and Leisure Software Publishers Association (ELSPA), indicating sales of at least 300,000 copies in the United Kingdom.
