= List of recurring characters in the James Bond film series =

The James Bond film series is a British series of spy films based on the fictional character of MI6 agent James Bond, "007", who originally appeared in a series of books by Ian Fleming. There have been twenty-five films in total released between 1962 and 2021 and produced by Eon Productions, which now holds the adaptation rights to all of Fleming's Bond novels. Bond has been portrayed in these films by six actors: Sean Connery, George Lazenby, Roger Moore, Timothy Dalton, Pierce Brosnan, and Daniel Craig.

Several of the series' supporting characters, such as M, Q, and Miss Moneypenny, are MI6 posts, not character names, and some of the actor changes in these positions reflect in-universe replacements. Such change was explicit for M in GoldenEye (1995), with Judi Dench's character referred to as a newcomer, and in Skyfall (2012), as Ralph Fiennes' character Gareth Mallory replaces Dench's character as M; it was explicit for Q in Die Another Day (2002), as John Cleese's character replaces Desmond Llewelyn's Q after being his apprentice in The World Is Not Enough (1999). There is only one clear case of a single M, Q, or Moneypenny character switching actor: when Q, Major Boothroyd, switches from Peter Burton in Dr. No (1962) to Desmond Llewelyn in From Russia with Love (1963).

== Overview ==
Film Character
| Film Character | Dr. No | From Russia with Love | Goldfinger | Thunderball | You Only Live Twice | On Her Majesty's Secret Service | Diamonds Are Forever | Live and Let Die | The Man with the Golden Gun | The Spy Who Loved Me | Moonraker | For Your Eyes Only | Octopussy | A View to a Kill | The Living Daylights | Licence to Kill | GoldenEye | Tomorrow Never Dies | The World Is Not Enough | Die Another Day | Casino Royale | Quantum of Solace | Skyfall | Spectre | No Time to Die |
|---|---|---|---|---|---|---|---|---|---|---|---|---|---|---|---|---|---|---|---|---|---|---|---|---|---|
| James Bond 007 | Yes | | | | | | | Yes | | | | | | | Yes | | Yes | | | | Yes | | | | |
| Felix Leiter | Yes | | Yes | | | | Yes | Yes | | | | | | | Yes | | | | | | Yes | | | | Yes |
| M | Yes | | | | | | | Yes | | | | | Yes | | Yes | | Yes | | | | Yes | | | | |
| Miss Moneypenny | Yes | | | | | | | Yes | | | | | | | Yes | | Yes | | | | | | Yes | | |
| Q | Yes | | | | | | | | Yes | | | | | | Yes | | Yes | | | | | | Yes | | |
| Sylvia Trench | Yes | | | | | | | | | | | | | | | | | | | | | | | | |
| Ernst Stavro Blofeld | | Yes | | Yes | | | | | | | | Yes | | | | | | | | | | | | Yes | |
| Sheriff J. W. Pepper | | | | | | | | Yes | | | | | | | | | | | | | | | | | |
| William "Bill" Tanner | | | | | | | | | Yes | | | Yes | | | | | Yes | | Yes | | | Yes | | | |
| General Gogol | | | | | | | | | | Yes | | | | | Yes | | | | | | | | | | |
| Sir Frederick Gray | | | | | | | | | | Yes | | | | | Yes | | | | | | | | | | |
| Jaws | | | | | | | | | | Yes | | | | | | | | | | | | | | | |
| Rublevitch | | | | | | | | | | Yes | | Yes | | | | | | | | | | | | | |
| Smithers | | | | | | | | | | | | Yes | | | | | | | | | | | | | |
| Jack Wade | | | | | | | | | | | | | | | | | Yes | | | | | | | | |
| Valentin Zukovsky | | | | | | | | | | | | | | | | | Yes | | Yes | | | | | | |
| Charles Robinson | | | | | | | | | | | | | | | | | | Yes | | | | | | | |
| René Mathis | | | | | | | | | | | | | | | | | | | | | Yes | | | | |
| Mr White | | | | | | | | | | | | | | | | | | | | | Yes | | | Yes | |
| Dr. Madeleine Swann | | | | | | | | | | | | | | | | | | | | | | | | Yes | |
| Dr. Vogel | | | | | | | | | | | | | | | | | | | | | | | | Yes | |

== By era ==
=== 1962–1971: Sean Connery and George Lazenby ===
List indicators

This section includes characters who have appeared in two or more Sean Connery films.

- An empty grey cell indicates the character was not in the film.
- ^{V} indicates a voice-only role.
- ^{R} indicates the actor reprises their role in a later era.

| Character | 1962 | 1963 | 1964 | 1965 | 1967 | 1969 | 1971 |
| Character | Dr. No | From Russia with Love | Goldfinger | Thunderball | You Only Live Twice | On Her Majesty's Secret Service | Diamonds Are Forever |
|---|---|---|---|---|---|---|---|
| James Bond 007 | Sean Connery | Sean Connery | Sean Connery | Sean Connery | Sean Connery | George Lazenby | Sean Connery |
| Felix Leiter | Jack Lord | | Cec Linder | Rik Van Nutter | | | Norman Burton |
| M | Bernard Lee^{R} | Bernard Lee^{R} | Bernard Lee^{R} | Bernard Lee^{R} | Bernard Lee^{R} | Bernard Lee^{R} | Bernard Lee^{R} |
| Miss Moneypenny | Lois Maxwell^{R} | Lois Maxwell^{R} | Lois Maxwell^{R} | Lois Maxwell^{R} | Lois Maxwell^{R} | Lois Maxwell^{R} | Lois Maxwell^{R} |
| Q | Peter Burton | Desmond Llewelyn^{R} | Desmond Llewelyn^{R} | Desmond Llewelyn^{R} | Desmond Llewelyn^{R} | Desmond Llewelyn^{R} | Desmond Llewelyn^{R} |
| Sylvia Trench | Eunice Gayson | Eunice Gayson | | | | | |
| Ernst Stavro Blofeld | | Anthony Dawson Eric Pohlmann^{V} | | Anthony Dawson Eric Pohlmann^{V} | Donald Pleasence | Telly Savalas | Charles Gray |

=== 1973–1985: Roger Moore ===
List indicators

This section includes characters who have appeared in two or more Roger Moore films.

- An empty grey cell indicates the character was not in the film.
- ^{U} indicates an uncredited appearance.
- ^{R} indicates the actor reprises their role in a later era.

| Character | 1973 | 1974 | 1977 | 1979 | 1981 | 1983 | 1985 |
| Character | Live and Let Die | The Man with the Golden Gun | The Spy Who Loved Me | Moonraker | For Your Eyes Only | Octopussy | A View to a Kill |
|---|---|---|---|---|---|---|---|
| James Bond 007 | Roger Moore | Roger Moore | Roger Moore | Roger Moore | Roger Moore | Roger Moore | Roger Moore |
| M | Bernard Lee | Bernard Lee | Bernard Lee | Bernard Lee | | Robert Brown^{R} | Robert Brown^{R} |
| Miss Moneypenny | Lois Maxwell | Lois Maxwell | Lois Maxwell | Lois Maxwell | Lois Maxwell | Lois Maxwell | Lois Maxwell |
| Sheriff J. W. Pepper | Clifton James | Clifton James | | | | | |
| Q | | Desmond Llewelyn^{R} | Desmond Llewelyn^{R} | Desmond Llewelyn^{R} | Desmond Llewelyn^{R} | Desmond Llewelyn^{R} | Desmond Llewelyn^{R} |
| Bill Tanner | | Michael Goodliffe^{U} | | | James Villiers | | |
| General Gogol | | | Walter Gotell | Walter Gotell | Walter Gotell | Walter Gotell | Walter Gotell |
| Sir Frederick Gray | | | Geoffrey Keen | Geoffrey Keen | Geoffrey Keen | Geoffrey Keen | Geoffrey Keen |
| Jaws | | | Richard Kiel | Richard Kiel | | | |
| Rublevitch | | | Eva Rueber-Staier | | Eva Rueber-Staier | Eva Rueber-Staier | |
| Smithers | | | | | Jeremy Bulloch | Jeremy Bulloch | |

=== 1987–1989: Timothy Dalton ===
List indicator

This section includes characters who have appeared in both Timothy Dalton films.

- An empty grey cell indicates the character was not in the film.
- ^{R} indicates the actor reprises their role in a later era.

| Character | 1987 | 1989 |
| Character | The Living Daylights | Licence to Kill |
|---|---|---|
| James Bond 007 | Timothy Dalton | Timothy Dalton |
| Felix Leiter | John Terry | David Hedison |
| M | Robert Brown | Robert Brown |
| Miss Moneypenny | Caroline Bliss | Caroline Bliss |
| Q | Desmond Llewelyn^{R} | Desmond Llewelyn^{R} |

=== 1995–2002: Pierce Brosnan ===
List indicator

This section includes characters who have appeared in two or more Pierce Brosnan films.

- An empty grey cell indicates the character was not in the film.
- ^{R} indicates the actor reprises their role in a later era.
- ^{Q} indicates that the character was designated R in the film.

| Character | 1995 | 1997 | 1999 | 2002 |
| Character | GoldenEye | Tomorrow Never Dies | The World Is Not Enough | Die Another Day |
|---|---|---|---|---|
| James Bond 007 | Pierce Brosnan | Pierce Brosnan | Pierce Brosnan | Pierce Brosnan |
| M | Judi Dench^{R} | Judi Dench^{R} | Judi Dench^{R} | Judi Dench^{R} |
| Miss Moneypenny | Samantha Bond | Samantha Bond | Samantha Bond | Samantha Bond |
| Q | Desmond Llewelyn | Desmond Llewelyn | Desmond Llewelyn John Cleese^{Q} | John Cleese |
| Bill Tanner | Michael Kitchen | | Michael Kitchen | |
| Jack Wade | Joe Don Baker | Joe Don Baker | | |
| Valentin Zukovsky | Robbie Coltrane | | Robbie Coltrane | |
| Charles Robinson | | Colin Salmon | Colin Salmon | Colin Salmon |

=== 2006–2021: Daniel Craig ===
List indicators

This section includes characters who have appeared in two or more Daniel Craig films.

- An empty grey cell indicates the character was not in the film.
- ^{C} indicates a cameo role.

| Character | 2006 | 2008 | 2012 | 2015 | 2021 |
| Character | Casino Royale | Quantum of Solace | Skyfall | Spectre | No Time to Die |
|---|---|---|---|---|---|
| James Bond 007 | Daniel Craig | Daniel Craig | Daniel Craig | Daniel Craig | Daniel Craig |
| Felix Leiter | Jeffrey Wright | Jeffrey Wright | | | Jeffrey Wright |
| Olivia Mansfield M (Note: Olivia Mansfield (Judi Dench's M) dies in Skyfall (2012) and is replaced by character Gareth Mallory (Ralph Fiennes), appearing earlier in the same film. In Spectre (2015), Mansfield has a cameo appearance in a video she recorded before her murder.) | Judi Dench | Judi Dench | Judi Dench | Judi Dench^{C} | |
| René Mathis | Giancarlo Giannini | Giancarlo Giannini | | | |
| Mr White | Jesper Christensen | Jesper Christensen | | Jesper Christensen | |
| Bill Tanner | | Rory Kinnear | Rory Kinnear | Rory Kinnear | Rory Kinnear |
| Gareth Mallory M | | | Ralph Fiennes | Ralph Fiennes | Ralph Fiennes |
| Eve Moneypenny | | | Naomie Harris | Naomie Harris | Naomie Harris |
| Q | | | Ben Whishaw | Ben Whishaw | Ben Whishaw |
| Franz Oberhauser Ernst Stavro Blofeld | | | | Christoph Waltz | Christoph Waltz |
| Dr. Madeleine Swann | | | | Léa Seydoux | Léa Seydoux |
| Dr. Vogel | | | | Brigitte Millar | Brigitte Millar |

== See also ==
- Outline of James Bond
