= Critics' Choice Movie Award for Best Actor in an Action Movie =

Award given by the Broadcast Film Critics Association

The Critics' Choice Movie Award for Best Actor in an Action Movie is one of the awards given to people working in the motion picture industry by the Broadcast Film Critics Association at their annual Critics' Choice Movie Awards.

== List of winners and nominees ==
=== 2010s ===
Year	Actor	Character	Film
2012	Daniel Craig	James Bond	Skyfall
2012	Christian Bale	Bruce Wayne / Batman	The Dark Knight Rises
2012	Robert Downey Jr.	Tony Stark / Iron Man	The Avengers
2012	Joseph Gordon-Levitt	Young Joe	Looper
2012	Jake Gyllenhaal	Brian Taylor	End of Watch
2013	Mark Wahlberg	Marcus Luttrell	Lone Survivor
2013	Henry Cavill	Clark Kent / Superman	Man of Steel
2013	Robert Downey Jr.	Tony Stark / Iron Man	Iron Man 3
2013	Brad Pitt	Gerry Lane	World War Z
2014	Bradley Cooper	Chris Kyle	American Sniper
2014	Tom Cruise	Major William Cage	Edge of Tomorrow
2014	Chris Evans	Steve Rogers / Captain America	Captain America: The Winter Soldier
2014	Brad Pitt	Don "Wardaddy" Collier	Fury
2014	Chris Pratt	Peter Quill / Star-Lord	Guardians of the Galaxy
2015	Tom Hardy	Max Rockatansky	Mad Max: Fury Road
2015	Daniel Craig	James Bond	Spectre
2015	Tom Cruise	Ethan Hunt	Mission: Impossible – Rogue Nation
2015	Chris Pratt	Owen Grady	Jurassic World
2015	Paul Rudd	Scott Lang / Ant-Man	Ant-Man
2016	Andrew Garfield	Desmond T. Doss	Hacksaw Ridge
2016	Benedict Cumberbatch	Stephen Strange / Doctor Strange	Doctor Strange
2016	Matt Damon	Jason Bourne	Jason Bourne
2016	Chris Evans	Steve Rogers / Captain America	Captain America: Civil War
2016	Ryan Reynolds	Wade Wilson / Deadpool	Deadpool

== Multiple nominees ==
2 nominations

- Daniel Craig
- Tom Cruise
- Robert Downey Jr.
- Chris Evans
- Brad Pitt
- Chris Pratt

Hhh
