= Day of the Dead Parade =

Annual parade in Mexico City

A float with a Calavera Catrina on it during the 2016 parade

The Day of the Dead Parade (Spanish: Gran Desfile de Día de Muertos) is an annual parade through Mexico City, Mexico, held on a weekend close to the traditional Day of the Dead (November 1 and 2).

The Day of the Dead is a longstanding tradition in Mexico, but the practice of holding a parade in Mexico City began in 2016 after being inspired by the 2015 James Bond film Spectre, which featured a fictional parade at the beginning of the film. Because of the interest the film generated, the government decided to organize a similar event.

The first parade took place on 29 October 2016, with a route that began at the Angel of Independence, along Paseo de la Reforma, and ended at the Zócalo, in the historic center. Since then, the route has expanded from the Angel of Independence to the Puerta de los Leones, in Chapultepec.

During the parades, floats are decorated with symbols associated with the Day of the Dead, including the Calavera Catrina, an image and associated character depicting a calavera ('skull'), or people dressed as such. In addition to floats, the parade features mojigangas, marching bands, and dancers. The event is dedicated annually. For example, during the 2024 parade David Alfaro Siqueiros, Lucha Reyes and Rosario Castellanos were honored, while in the 2026 parade, Juan Gabriel, Emilio Fernández and the Mayan Red Queen were honored. Inmates have been allowed to participate in the parade by building floats, including a monumental calavera in 2023 or a trajinera in 2025.

In 2020, the parade was canceled due to the COVID-19 pandemic, and resumed the following year following preventive measures. The first parade was expected to draw 135,000 visitors; by 2025, 1.5 million people attended the event. The 2026 parade received a Guinness World Record for the largest Catrina statue.

== See also ==
- Mexico City Alebrije Parade, an annual event honoring Mexican handcrafts and folk art
- Pizza effect, the phenomenon of elements of a nation's or people's culture being transformed or at least more fully embraced elsewhere, then re-exported to their culture of origin
