= Ernst Stavro Blofeld =

James Bond supervillain

- James Bond character
- Donald Pleasence as Blofeld in You Only Live Twice (1967)
- First appearance: Thunderball (1961)
- Last appearance: No Time to Die (2021)
- Created by: Kevin McClory; Jack Whittingham; Ian Fleming
- Portrayed by: Anthony Dawson (uncredited); Donald Pleasence; Telly Savalas; Charles Gray; John Hollis (uncredited); Max von Sydow; Christoph Waltz
- Voiced by: Eric Pohlmann (uncredited); Peter Marinker (uncredited); Gideon Emery; Glenn Wrage

In-universe information
- Aliases: Dr. Guntram Shatterhand (You Only Live Twice; 1964 novel); Franz Oberhauser (Spectre; 2015 film)
- Affiliation: SPECTRE
- Family: In Thunderball (novel): Ernst George Blofeld (father); Maria Stavro Michelopoulos (mother); In Spectre (film): Hannes Oberhauser (father); Unnamed Blofeld (mother); James Bond (adoptive brother)
- Children: Nena Blofeld
- Nationality: Polish of Greek descent
- Classification: Criminal mastermind
- Henchmen: Rosa Klebb; Red Grant; Emilio Largo; Irma Bunt; Mr. Wint and Mr. Kidd; Mr. Hinx; Mr. White (prior to the events of Spectre)
- Allies: Dr. Julius No; Le Chiffre; Dominic Greene; Raoul Silva

Ernst Stavro Blofeld is a supervillain in the James Bond series of novels and films, created by writer Ian Fleming in collaboration with film producer Kevin McClory and screenwriter Jack Whittingham. A criminal mastermind with aspirations of world domination, he is the archenemy of British MI6 agent James Bond. Blofeld is head of the global criminal organisation SPECTRE and is commonly referred to by the codename Number 1 within this organisation. The character was originally written by Fleming as a physically massive and powerfully built man, standing around 6 ft 3 in (1.91 m) and weighing 20 stone (280 lb; 130 kg), who had become flabby with a huge belly.

The most recurring antagonist in the franchise, Blofeld appears or is heard in three novels: Thunderball (1961), On Her Majesty's Secret Service (1963); and You Only Live Twice (1964); as well as eight films from Eon Productions: From Russia with Love (1963), Thunderball (1965), You Only Live Twice (1967), On Her Majesty's Secret Service (1969), Diamonds Are Forever (1971), possibly For Your Eyes Only (1981; the pre-title sequence depicts a similar but unnamed character), Spectre (2015) and No Time to Die (2021). The latter two films are set in a rebooted continuity, which started with Casino Royale (2006). Blofeld also appears in Never Say Never Again (1983), a remake of Thunderball that was not produced by Eon.

Blofeld has been played on-screen by Donald Pleasence, Telly Savalas, Charles Gray, Max von Sydow and Christoph Waltz, among others. It was initially a convention of the films not to show Blofeld's face, only a close-up of his hands stroking his white, blue-eyed Persian cat. His face is revealed in You Only Live Twice when he introduces himself to Bond for the first time in person.

Many of Blofeld's characteristics–particularly his stroking of a white cat–have become tropes in popular fiction which allude to the criminal mastermind stock character. Such parodies can be seen in the Austin Powers film series with the villain Dr. Evil and his cat Mr. Bigglesworth; in the Inspector Gadget franchise with Dr. Claw and MAD Cat; in Danger Mouse with Baron Silas Greenback; and in Wallace & Gromit: Vengeance Most Fowl, with Feathers McGraw and a white seal pup.

== Character ==
Ian Fleming includes information about Ernst Stavro Blofeld's background in his novel Thunderball. According to the novel, Blofeld was born on 28 May 1908 (which is also Fleming's birthdate) in Gdingen, Imperial Germany (now Gdynia, Poland); his father Ernst George Blofeld was Polish of German descent, and his mother Maria Stavro Michelopoulos was Greek, hence his Greek middle name Stavro. After World War I, Blofeld became a Polish national. As a young man, he was well-versed in the social science disciplines, but also in the natural science and technology disciplines. He first graduated from the University of Warsaw with a degree in Political History and Economics, and then from the Warsaw University of Technology with a degree in Engineering and Radionics. He was then hired by the Polish Ministry of Posts and Telegraphs and appointed to a sensitive communication position, which he used for buying and selling stocks at the Warsaw Stock Exchange.

Foreseeing World War II, Blofeld made copies of top-secret wires and sold them for cash to Nazi Germany. Before the German invasion of Poland in 1939, he destroyed all records of his existence, then moved first to Sweden, then to Turkey, where he worked for Turkish Radio and began to set up his own private intelligence organisation. During the war, he sold information to both sides. After the defeat of Erwin Rommel, he decided to back the Allied war effort, and was awarded numerous medals by the Allied powers after the war's end. Blofeld then moved temporarily to South America before founding SPECTRE.

In the John Gardner novel For Special Services, Blofeld is depicted as having had a daughter, Nena, with a French prostitute.

Basil Zaharoff, a Greek arms dealer, is generally thought was used by Ian Fleming as the basis of the character of Blofeld, although Fleming himself never confirmed it.

The name Blofeld, it is commonly believed, was inspired by the English cricket commentator Henry Blofeld's father, Thomas Blofeld, with whom Fleming went to school. Henry Blofeld offered on the BBC Radio 4 series Just a Minute that "Ian took my father's name as the name of the baddie." It was actually revealed that it was based on Thomas's brother, John Blofeld, a judge, after Fleming saw his name on the membership list at Boodle's and deemed it as an appropriate villain's name.

== In novels ==
Blofeld has three appearances in Ian Fleming's novels. He first appears in a minor role as the leader of SPECTRE in the 1961 novel Thunderball. The plot that he formulates is carried out by his second-in-command Emilio Largo. Blofeld is described physically as a massive man, weighing roughly 20 stone (280 lb; 130 kg), who had previously been a champion amateur weightlifter in his youth before becoming obese in middle age; he has black crew-cut hair, black eyes (similar to those of Benito Mussolini), heavy eyelashes, a thin mouth, and long pointed hands and feet. He has violet-scented breath from chewing flavored cachous (breath mints), a habit he adopts whenever he must deliver bad news. A meticulous planner of formidable intellect, he seems to be without conscience but not necessarily insane, and is motivated solely by financial gain. Blofeld's lifestyle is described in one chapter in Thunderball: "For the rest, he didn't smoke or drink and he had never been known to sleep with a member of either sex. He didn't even eat very much."

The novel Thunderball indicates that Blofeld wants to be a man of honour, or at least pose as one. During a meeting of SPECTRE agents, he refers to the kidnapping of a teenage girl, who was to be returned unharmed once her father paid the ransom. However, he refunded half the money after learning that she had been raped by her abductor Pierre Borraud (codename No. 12), and he kills Borraud by electrocuting him in his chair. This is the third instance in which Blofeld kills an operative for a breach of discipline; he had earlier shot one through the heart with a needle fired from a compressed-air gun, and strangled another with a garrote. In the movie Thunderball, Blofeld kills his agent No. 9 (Clive Cazes) for embezzlement rather than rape.

Blofeld is absent from the next novel, The Spy Who Loved Me, though its events take place while James Bond is battling SPECTRE in North America. In On Her Majesty's Secret Service (1963), Bond learns that Blofeld has altered his appearance radically – he is now tall and thin, having reduced his weight to 12 stone (170 lb; 76 kg); sports long silver hair, a syphilitic infection on his nose, and no earlobes; and he wears dark green tinted contact lenses to hide his distinctive eyes. Perhaps less calculating than previously, he is notably saddled with the exploitable weakness of snobbery about his assumed nobility, indicating that he is losing his sanity. He is hiding in Switzerland in the guise of the Comte Balthazar de Bleuville and Bond defeats his vindictive plans to destroy Britain's agricultural economy (implied to be carried out on behalf of the Soviet Union). In the final sequence of the novel, Blofeld gets revenge by murdering Bond's new wife, Tracy Bond.

In You Only Live Twice, published in 1964, Blofeld returns and Bond finds him hiding in Japan under the alias Dr. Guntram Shatterhand. He has once again changed his appearance. He has put on some muscle and has a gold-capped tooth, a fully healed nose, and a drooping grey mustache. Bond describes Blofeld on their confrontation as being "a big man, perhaps six foot three (190 cm), and powerfully built." It is indicated that Blofeld has by now gone completely insane, as he all but admits himself when Bond levels the accusation. Bond strangles him to death in a fit of rage at the end of the novel (something that he had done only once before, to Auric Goldfinger).

In both On Her Majesty's Secret Service and You Only Live Twice, Blofeld is aided in his schemes by Irma Bunt, who is clearly his lover in the latter, and posing as Shatterhand's wife Emmy. Bond incapacitates her in their Japanese castle base before it blows up, killing her.

The final mention of Blofeld is in the beginning of the next novel, The Man with the Golden Gun, published in 1965.

== In films ==
Blofeld in You Only Live Twice (Donald Pleasence), On Her Majesty's Secret Service (Telly Savalas), Diamonds Are Forever (Charles Gray), Never Say Never Again (Max von Sydow) and Spectre (Christoph Waltz)

Blofeld's depiction in film influenced with great effect the depiction of supervillains and (together with that of Marlon Brando's character Don Vito Corleone in The Godfather) that of Mafia bosses both in films and printed media, as, since his first appearance on the big screen in 1963, he established some "standards" imitated for decades, such as mysterious identities, being portrayed stroking a pet and with the face unseen by the spectator or the viewpoint character, and the concept of spectacularly executing underlings who fail to defeat the main protagonist.

=== Original timeline ===
In the film series, Blofeld first appears in From Russia with Love (credited as "Ernst Blofeld", though the name is never heard), then in Thunderball (uncredited). In these two appearances, his name is never spoken, his face is not seen, and only his lower body is visible as he strokes his trademark white cat. He is portrayed by Anthony Dawson and voiced by Eric Pohlmann.

Originally, On Her Majesty's Secret Service was to include the twist that Blofeld was Auric Goldfinger's twin brother, and would be portrayed by Gert Fröbe. However, this plotline was scrapped when it was delayed in favor of You Only Live Twice. Czech actor Jan Werich was originally cast by producer Harry Saltzman to play Blofeld in You Only Live Twice. Upon his arrival at the Pinewood set, both producer Albert R. Broccoli and director Lewis Gilbert felt that he was a bad choice, resembling a "poor, benevolent Santa Claus." Nonetheless, in an attempt to make the casting work, Gilbert continued filming. After five days, both Gilbert and Broccoli determined that Werich was not menacing enough, and recast Donald Pleasence in the role – the official excuse being that Werich was ill.

In the third, fourth, and fifth appearances – You Only Live Twice, On Her Majesty's Secret Service and Diamonds Are Forever – he is the primary antagonist, meeting Bond face-to-face. In the film version of On Her Majesty's Secret Service, Blofeld (Telly Savalas) is not Tracy Bond's (Diana Rigg) actual killer—rather, he plots to have Tracy killed. He drives the car from which Irma Bunt (Ilse Steppat) fires the fatal shots at Tracy, minutes after she had married Bond (George Lazenby). During the opening sequence of Diamonds Are Forever, Bond (Sean Connery) searches relentlessly for Blofeld (Charles Gray) and finds him overseeing the transformation of a henchman into a decoy duplicate, using plastic surgery. Bond drowns the decoy in a mud bath and kills Blofeld by shoving him into a volcanic pool, saying "Welcome to Hell, Blofeld." After the credits, M (Bernard Lee) tells Bond that now that Blofeld is dead, finished, he expects Bond to engage in "a little plain, solid work." Of course, the man Bond killed turns out to be a duplicate. Bond would meet Blofeld again, along with another decoy, later in the film before eliminating the second decoy, and crashing Blofeld's bathosub into the control room of an exploding oil rig, his fate left ambiguous.

In a sixth appearance – in the pre-credit sequence of For Your Eyes Only – he is an anonymous bald villain (John Hollis) who uses a wheelchair and is trying to kill Bond (Roger Moore) once again. Due to the then-ongoing legal dispute between Kevin McClory and Eon Productions/United Artists over the Thunderball copyrights, Blofeld remained unnamed. There are clues hinting to his identity such as the trademark white cat, similar clothes to his previous onscreen appearances and dialogue indicating he and Bond have met before.

Blofeld's appearance changes according to the personifying actor and the production. He has a full head of black hair in From Russia With Love and Thunderball; a bald head and a facial dueling scar in You Only Live Twice; a bald head with no scar or earlobes in On Her Majesty's Secret Service; and silver-grey hair in Diamonds Are Forever. This metamorphosing matches Fleming's literary portrayal of a master criminal who will go to great lengths to preserve his anonymity, including the use of plastic surgery. He often wears a jacket without lapels, based loosely either on the Nehru jacket or on the Mao suit, a feature which is used in spoofs like the Austin Powers series, though in his early two appearances on film he wears a black business suit.

=== Rebooted continuity ===
By November 2013, Metro-Goldwyn-Mayer and the McClory estate had formally settled the issue with Danjaq and MGM and acquired the full copyright to the characters and concepts of Blofeld and SPECTRE. Blofeld consequently reappeared in Spectre, played by Christoph Waltz, and with a new background. In this continuity, he was born Franz Oberhauser, the son of Hannes Oberhauser (a character from the original short story "Octopussy"), James Bond's (Daniel Craig) legal guardian after being orphaned at the age of 11, making him and Bond adoptive brothers. As a young man, he resented Bond for being his father's favorite, leading him to murder his father, stage his own death, and take on the alias of "Ernst Stavro Blofeld", derived from his mother's maiden name. Over time, he assembled a global criminal organisation known as Spectre. Additionally, it is revealed that the villains of the previous Craig films – Le Chiffre (Mads Mikkelsen), Mr. White (Jesper Christensen), Dominic Greene (Mathieu Amalric), and Raoul Silva (Javier Bardem) – were all really working for Spectre.

Bond encounters Blofeld while investigating a worldwide terrorist network, later revealed to be Spectre. Bond discovers that Blofeld is trying to take control of Nine Eyes, a global surveillance program, with help from treasonous Joint Intelligence Service agent Max Denbigh (Andrew Scott), and staging terrorist attacks in order to justify the program's existence. Bond and Madeleine Swann (Léa Seydoux), Mr. White's daughter, confront Blofeld at his hideout in the Sahara, where he gloats about being indirectly responsible for several tragedies in Bond's life, including the deaths of his lover Vesper Lynd (Eva Green) and the previous M (Judi Dench). He then tortures his foster brother by strapping him to a mechanical chair with surgical drills programmed to penetrate different areas of Bond's brain. At the last second, however, Bond destroys the chair with an exploding watch given to him by Q (Ben Whishaw); the explosion destroys Blofeld's right eye and leaves him with a vertical scar running down the wounded socket. Nevertheless, Blofeld manages to escape. Bond ultimately foils Blofeld's plans and has the opportunity to kill him, but decides to spare his life, and Gareth Mallory (Ralph Fiennes), the current M, takes Blofeld into custody.

Blofeld, again portrayed by Waltz, appears in the 2021 Bond film No Time to Die. He has been held in solitary confinement at Belmarsh prison for six years since his capture, but has been covertly running Spectre while feigning insanity. Blofeld has operatives steal the "Heracles" bioweapon and lure Bond to a meeting of high-ranking Spectre agents in the hopes of infecting and killing him.

However, Blofeld's plan is sabotaged by bioterrorist Lyutsifer Safin (Rami Malek), whose entire family was murdered by Mr. White on orders from Blofeld. Safin has the bioweapon altered by corrupt MI6 scientist Valdo Obruchev (David Dencik) so that it wipes out all the Spectre agents instead of Bond. Safin then coerces Swann to infect Blofeld with a strain of Heracles targeting his DNA. While attending Bond's interrogation of Blofeld, Swann unknowingly passes the bioweapon onto him before abandoning Safin's plan. Blofeld reveals he manipulated Bond into believing Swann had betrayed him five years earlier, resulting in Bond ending their relationship. Enraged, Bond chokes Blofeld, unwittingly infecting him and killing him within seconds.

This incarnation wears a jacket without lapels and has a full head of hair, reminiscent of the Donald Pleasence, Charles Gray, and Telly Savalas versions of the character, respectively. His disfigurement later in the film echoes the scar and blind eye of Pleasence's version. He is also briefly shown with a white Persian cat, similar to the one from the Sean Connery era films.

=== Table of film appearances ===
Year	Film	Actor and notes	Status after the film concludes
1963	From Russia with Love	Anthony Dawson as actor (only hands and back of head are seen), Eric Pohlmann as voice actor; the end credits list a question mark instead of an actor's name in the "Ernst Blofeld" field (however, he is only referred to as "Number One" in the film).	Active/indirect involvement in the field. Never has any contact with James Bond.
1965	Thunderball	Anthony Dawson as actor (only hands and back of head are seen), Eric Pohlmann as voice actor, both uncredited.	Active/indirect involvement in the field. Never has any contact with James Bond.
1967	You Only Live Twice	Donald Pleasence. Actor Jan Werich was originally cast; some clips show his hands petting the cat, and a tuft of hair can be seen just above the back of his chair. Pleasence, with a fake white eye and scar on his face, replaced Werich during filming when the latter was deemed unsuited for the role.	Injured in his right hand by a shuriken; escapes.
1969	On Her Majesty's Secret Service	Telly Savalas; appears with earlobes removed to back up claim to a noble title.	Escapes; he was the driver in the drive-by murder of Tracy Bond.
1971	Diamonds Are Forever	Charles Gray; appears also as doubles, all created via plastic surgery.	He attempts to escape in his Bathosub, but Bond gains control of it and crashes it into the control room.
1981	For Your Eyes Only	John Hollis as actor, Peter Marinker as voice actor; Blofeld's face is not seen close-up and his name is not used due to the legal battle with Kevin McClory (revealed in the film's DVD commentary).	Dropped down an industrial chimney from a helicopter.
1983	Never Say Never Again (non-Eon)	Max von Sydow. Appears in a small number of scenes.	Active/indirect involvement in the field. Never has any direct contact with Bond.
2015	Spectre	Christoph Waltz; he, identified as being of Austrian ancestry, is initially known by his birth name as "Franz Oberhauser", but reveals that he began using his mother's maiden name, "Blofeld", after faking his own death. Later, Bond disfigures him in an explosion, leaving him with a milky eye and a scar reminiscent of Pleasence's portrayal.	Captured by Bond and arrested by M. Placed in MI6 custody.
2021	No Time to Die	Christoph Waltz; he, identified as being of Austrian ancestry, is initially known by his birth name as "Franz Oberhauser", but reveals that he began using his mother's maiden name, "Blofeld", after faking his own death. Later, Bond disfigures him in an explosion, leaving him with a milky eye and a scar reminiscent of Pleasence's portrayal.	Dies after Bond unknowingly infects him with the "Heracles" DNA-based bioweapons during an interrogation.

== Comic books ==
In the James Bond comic books by Dynamite Entertainment, Blofeld appears as the main antagonist in the Agent of SPECTRE arc, which ran between March and July 2021. As in the original Ian Fleming novels, he is the son of a Polish father and a Greek mother; his mother belonged to a family of Greek ship-owners, with Blofeld inheriting a private fleet from her, which he manages to build up into a global shipping empire. His base of operations is the (fictional) Greek island of Meraki. Behind his veneer of respectability as a shipping billionaire, Blofeld is the leader of the resuscitated SPECTRE global criminal organisation, which had been thought dismantled since the end of the Cold War.

== Video games ==
Blofeld appears in the end of the 2004 video game GoldenEye: Rogue Agent, with the likeness of Donald Pleasence, voiced by Gideon Emery. Despite the character being clearly him, as chief of an anonymous but powerful crime syndicate, he is not named because of the then-ongoing copyright controversy that also prevented the open usage of the character in the Moore era films.

Blofeld is a playable multiplayer character in the 2010 video game GoldenEye 007 for the Wii, with the likeness of Charles Gray.

Blofeld is one of the main characters in the 2012 Craig-era video game 007 Legends, featured in the mission based on On Her Majesty's Secret Service (set between Quantum of Solace and Skyfall), in which the character is an amalgamation of the first three actors appearing in the official film series. Throughout the game, he is voiced by Glenn Wrage. Legends, released prior to Blofeld's appearance in Spectre, portrays a feud with 007 that is not related to the film, thus rendering the video game non-canonical to the cinematic timeline.

== Homages ==
Some of Blofeld's characteristics have become supervillain tropes in popular fiction and media, including the parodies Dr. Claw (voiced by Frank Welker and Don Francks) and his pet cat, M.A.D. Cat from the Inspector Gadget animated series (1983–1986), Team Rocket leader Giovanni and his Persian from the Pokémon television series, and Dr. Evil (Mike Myers) and his cat Mr. Bigglesworth from the Austin Powers film series (1997–2002). The 1999 The Powerpuff Girls episode "Cat Man Do" also features a supervillain with a cat named White Kitty (Mark Hamill), though it is White Kitty that turns out to be the criminal mastermind. In The Penguins of Madagascar, the recurring villain Dr. Blowhole (Neil Patrick Harris) is a parody and homage to Blofeld. The rendition for Lex Luthor (Clancy Brown) in Superman: The Animated Series, and to a certain extent, various entries of the DC Animated Universe, were derived in part from Telly Savalas' portrayal of Blofeld in On Her Majesty's Secret Service. The character The Grand Master (played by Kerry Shale and Julian Bleach) and pet rabbit General Flopsy from the CBBC series M.I. High (2007–2014) are heavily based on characteristics popularised in Blofeld.

In the fourth episode of the first season of Monty Python's Flying Circus in 1969, Eric Idle played Arthur Lemming, secret agent for the British Dental Association, who found himself up against the forces of The Big Cheese (Graham Chapman), a diabolical dentist who appeared out of a secret panel in the wall with a stuffed rabbit called Flopsy on his knee.

The character of Shakaal, a villain from the 1980 Indian action film Shaan portrayed by Kulbhushan Kharbanda, was modelled after Blofeld in appearance and Kharbanda was especially cast in the role for his bald look.

In the video games Evil Genius and Evil Genius 2: World Domination, a player avatar named Maximilian is modeled on Blofeld, specifically the Donald Pleasence version.

In 1987, an edition of Saturday Night Live presented a skit called "Bullets Aren't Cheap", featuring Steve Martin as a particularly penurious Bond. That evening's musical guest Sting portrayed a villain called Goldsting, who wore a Nehru jacket and, like The Big Cheese, carried a stuffed bunny rabbit.

Similar to The Powerpuff Girls, General Viggo (a white Persian cat) is the villain of the video game Fur Fighters, while his pet is a small mutant human named Fifi.

One of the two main villains of the 2005 video game TimeSplitters: Future Perfect, Archibald Khallos (Les Spink), is heavily based upon Blofeld, being presented as an evil genius with a white cat named Strudel. One section of the game even allows the player to remotely control Strudel.

In the Alex Rider novels, the supporting character Mrs. Jones, the deputy head and later chief of MI6, is often seen chewing peppermints before speaking with the titular character, a habit associated with Blofeld.

In the 1999 video game Donkey Kong 64, the mannerisms of the main antagonist, King K. Rool, are a reference to this character. Through much of the game his face is seldomly shown, and he frequently strokes his pet Klaptrap, which resembles a small crocodile.

== See also ==
- List of recurring characters in the James Bond film series
- List of James Bond villains
