= Spectre (2015 film) =

James Bond film directed by Sam Mendes

- British theatrical release poster
- Directed by: Sam Mendes
- Screenplay by: John Logan; Neal Purvis Robert Wade; Jez Butterworth
- Story by: John Logan; Neal Purvis; Robert Wade
- Based on: James Bond by Ian Fleming
- Produced by: Michael G. Wilson; Barbara Broccoli
- Starring: Daniel Craig; Christoph Waltz; Léa Seydoux; Ben Whishaw; Naomie Harris; Dave Bautista; Monica Bellucci; Ralph Fiennes
- Cinematography: Hoyte van Hoytema
- Edited by: Lee Smith
- Music by: Thomas Newman
- Production companies: Metro-Goldwyn-Mayer; Columbia Pictures; Eon Productions
- Distributed by: Sony Pictures Releasing
- Release dates: 26 October 2015 (United Kingdom); 6 November 2015 (United States)
- Running time: 148 minutes
- Countries: United Kingdom; United States
- Language: English
- Budget: $245–300 million (Note: The production budget for Spectre has been debated. Estimates range from $245–250 to as high as $300–350 million. The $350 million figure also incorporates the $100 million marketing budget. $21.5 million was spent on television advertisements and a further $100 million was spent on promotion and advertising.)
- Box office: $880.7 million

Spectre is a 2015 spy film and the twenty-fourth instalment in the James Bond film series produced by Eon Productions. The sequel to Skyfall (2012), it is the fourth film to star Daniel Craig as the fictional MI6 agent James Bond. The film was directed by Sam Mendes and written by John Logan, Neal Purvis, Robert Wade, and Jez Butterworth from a story conceived by Logan, Purvis, and Wade. The film co-stars Christoph Waltz, Léa Seydoux, Ben Whishaw, Naomie Harris, Dave Bautista, Monica Bellucci, and Ralph Fiennes. It was the last Bond film to be co-distributed by Sony Pictures Releasing. In the film, Bond battles SPECTRE, an international crime organisation led by Ernst Stavro Blofeld (Waltz).

Despite initially stating he would not direct Spectre, Mendes confirmed his return in 2014 after Nicolas Winding Refn declined to direct; Mendes became the first to direct successive James Bond films since John Glen. The inclusion of Spectre and its associated characters marked the end of the Thunderball controversy, in which Kevin McClory and Fleming were embroiled in lengthy legal disputes over the film rights to the novel; Spectre is the first film to feature these elements since Diamonds Are Forever (1971). Following the Sony Pictures hack, it was revealed Sony and Eon clashed regarding finance, stunts, and filming locations; Spectre is estimated to have a final budget of $245–300 million. Principal photography began in December 2014 and lasted until July 2015, with filming locations including Austria, the United Kingdom, Italy, Morocco, and Mexico.

Spectre premiered at the Royal Albert Hall on 26 October 2015 and was theatrically released in conventional and IMAX formats in the United Kingdom that day, and in the United States on 6 November. The film received mixed-to-positive reviews from critics, who praised the action sequences, cast performances (particularly Craig's and Waltz's) and Newman's musical score, but criticised the pacing and formulaic narrative decisions. It grossed $880.7 million worldwide, making it the sixth-highest-grossing film of 2015 and the second-highest grossing James Bond film after Skyfall, unadjusted for inflation (fourth when adjusted). The film's theme song, "Writing's on the Wall", won an Academy Award and Golden Globe for Best Original Song. The next and most recent film in the series, No Time to Die, was released in 2021.

== Plot ==
A cryptic message from the previous M leads MI6 agent James Bond to carry out a mission in Mexico City, foiling a terrorist bombing attempt at the Mexico City Metropolitan Cathedral during the Day of the Dead festival. Bond obtains a ring, stylised with an octopus, from deceased attacker Marco Sciarra and uncovers his connection to a secret organisation.

In London, Gareth Mallory, the current M, suspends Bond for his unauthorised action. M is engaged in a power struggle with Max Denbigh (whom Bond dubs "C"), the Director-General of the new privately backed Joint Intelligence Service formed by the merger of MI5 and MI6. C campaigns for Britain to join the global surveillance and intelligence initiative "Nine Eyes" and shut down the '00' section. Bond, who was operating on a mission posthumously assigned by the previous M to eliminate Sciarra and track down his employers, goes rogue from MI6, with Eve Moneypenny and Q agreeing to aid Bond covertly.

Following the previous M's instructions, Bond attends Sciarra's funeral in Rome and rescues his widow Lucia from assassins. Lucia reveals Sciarra's association with a terrorist network run by Franz Oberhauser, who has been presumed dead for twenty years. Using Sciarra's ring, Bond infiltrates a meeting, where Oberhauser targets the "Pale King" for assassination. Oberhauser recognises Bond, who flees across the city in a modified Aston Martin DB10, pursued by the network's top assassin Hinx. Moneypenny identifies the Pale King as Mr. White, a former member of the organisation's subsidiary Quantum. (Note: As depicted in Quantum of Solace (2008)) Bond tracks White down to Altaussee, where he is dying of thallium poisoning.

Bond offers to protect White's daughter Madeleine Swann, a psychiatrist who possesses knowledge about "L'Américain". White commits suicide. Bond finds Madeleine, who is reluctant to trust him until Hinx and his forces abduct her. Bond rescues Madeleine, earning him her trust. Q reveals Le Chiffre, (Note: As depicted in Casino Royale (2006)) Dominic Greene, and Raoul Silva (Note: As depicted in Skyfall (2012)) as agents of Oberhauser's organisation, which Madeleine reveals is named Spectre. Madeleine takes Bond to L'Américain, a hotel in Tangier, where a secret room directs them to Oberhauser's base in the Sahara. Hinx ambushes them en route to the base, but they fight him off and defeat him. Arriving at the base, Bond and Madeleine confront Oberhauser, who reveals Spectre's involvement in the Joint Intelligence Service and the Nine Eyes programme.

C, complicit in Spectre's scheme, plans to give Spectre unrestricted access to intelligence gathered by Nine Eyes. After showing Madeleine a distressing recording of her father's suicide, Oberhauser subjects Bond to neurosurgical torture: he shares the discussion with Bond to Madeleine, revealing that they became adoptive brothers after Bond's parents died. Believing that his father loved Bond more than him, Oberhauser killed him and staged his death as well. Since then, he founded Spectre intending to target Bond and adopted the name Ernst Stavro Blofeld. Bond and Madeleine break free, stun Blofeld with an explosive wristwatch, and destroy the base before fleeing to London to prevent Nine Eyes from going online.

In London, Bond, Madeleine, M, Q, Bill Tanner and Moneypenny gather to arrest C, but Madeleine and Bond are separately abducted by Spectre operatives, while the others proceed with the plan. After Q stops Nine Eyes from going online, a struggle between M and C results in C's death. Bond is taken to the ruins of the old MI6 building, scheduled for demolition after Silva's bombing, where Madeleine is held captive. Blofeld — who survived the Sahara base's destruction with heavy scarring to his right eye - gives Bond a three-minute ultimatum to abandon Madeleine or attempt a rescue and risk death. Bond finds a bound and gagged Madeleine, and they escape as the building collapses. Bond shoots down Blofeld's helicopter, which crashes onto Westminster Bridge. Blofeld survives and is arrested by M. Later, Bond receives his restored Aston Martin DB5 from Q and drives off with Madeleine.

== Cast ==
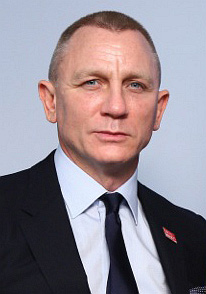
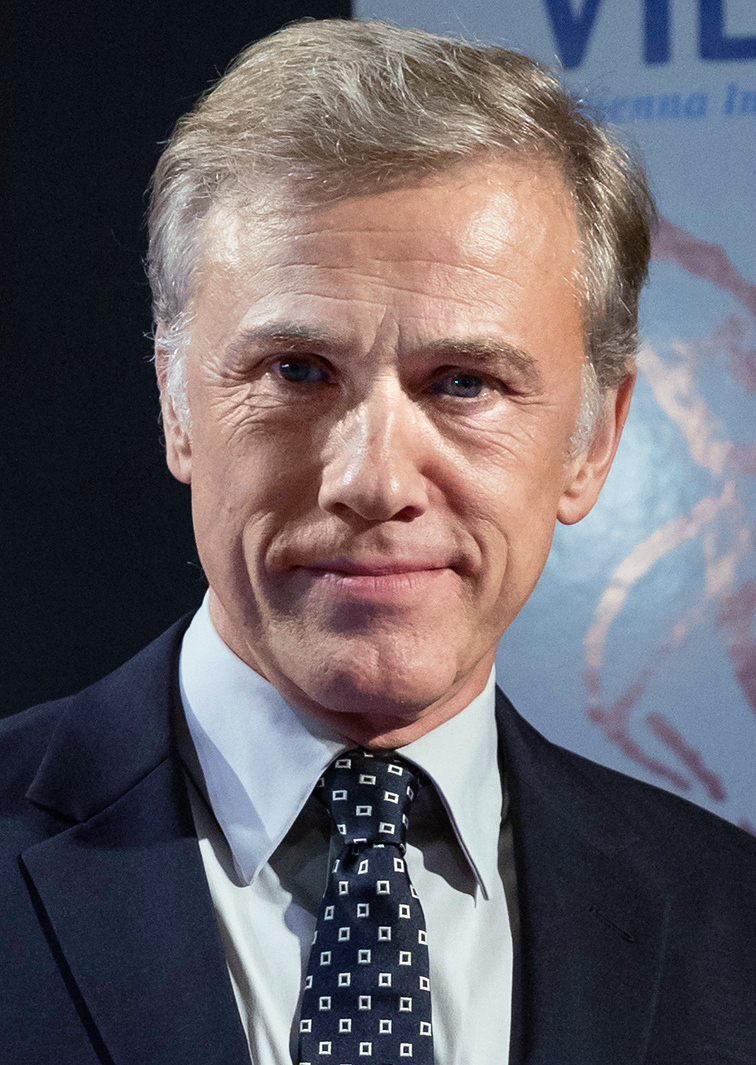
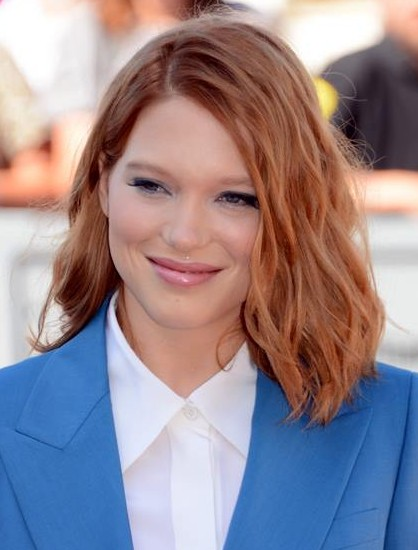
Daniel Craig (left), Christoph Waltz (both in 2017) and Léa Seydoux (in 2014)
- Daniel Craig as James Bond, agent 007. The director Sam Mendes has described Bond as being extremely focused in Spectre, likening his new-found dedication to hunting.
- Christoph Waltz as Ernst Stavro Blofeld (born Franz Oberhauser), Bond's nemesis and the enigmatic mastermind behind Spectre, as well as the puppeteer responsible for a series of recent events in Bond's life, motivated by a longstanding grudge against him.
- Léa Seydoux as Madeleine Swann, a psychiatrist working at a private medical clinic in the Austrian Alps, and the daughter of Mr White.
- Ben Whishaw as Q, MI6 quartermaster who outfits Bond with equipment for use in the field.
- Naomie Harris as Eve Moneypenny, a former agent who left the field to become M's assistant.
- Dave Bautista as Mr. Hinx, Spectre's top assassin.
- Andrew Scott as Max Denbigh "C", head of the new joint intelligence service and an agent for Spectre, heavily involved with their plan to merge nine national intelligence agencies into the Nine Eyes Committee, allowing Spectre to have the power to take over the world.
- Rory Kinnear as Bill Tanner, M's chief of staff.
- Jesper Christensen as Mr. White, a fugitive from MI6 and a former senior figure in Spectre's Quantum subsidiary, as portrayed in Casino Royale and Quantum of Solace, now dying from thallium poisoning after falling from Spectre's favour over his reservations relating to human trafficking.
- Monica Bellucci as Lucia Sciarra, the Italian wife of assassin Marco Sciarra.
- Ralph Fiennes as M (Gareth Mallory), head of MI6.
- Stephanie Sigman as Estrella, a Mexican agent who accompanies Bond on his mission to assassinate Marco Sciarra.
- Alessandro Cremona as Marco Sciarra, an Italian Spectre agent whom Bond kills in the pre-title sequence of the movie.
- Judi Dench as Mallory's predecessor M, who posthumously gives Bond his mission. This film marks Dench's eighth and final appearance as M, 20 years after beginning with GoldenEye.
- Tenoch Huerta as Mexican Man in Lift

== Production ==
=== Pre-production ===
In March 2013, Mendes said he would not return to direct the next film in the series, then known as Bond 24, but later recanted and announced that he would return, as he found the script and the plans for the long-term future of the franchise appealing. Nicolas Winding Refn would later reveal that he turned down an offer to direct the film. In directing Skyfall and Spectre, Mendes became the first director to oversee two successive Bond films since John Glen directed five consecutive films, ending with Licence to Kill in 1989. Dennis Gassner returned as the film's production designer, while cinematographer Hoyte van Hoytema took over from Roger Deakins. In July 2015 Mendes noted that the combined crew of Spectre numbered over one thousand, making it a larger production than Skyfall. Craig is listed as co-producer. He considered the credit a high point of his career, saying, "I'm just so proud of the fact that my name comes up somewhere else on the titles."

The film's use of the SPECTRE organisation and its characters marked the end of long-standing litigation between Eon Productions and producer Kevin McClory, who sued James Bond creator Ian Fleming in 1961 claiming ownership over elements of the novel Thunderball, and in an out of court settlement two years later, was awarded the novel's film rights, including Spectre and its characters. (Note: Following the settlement, McClory collaborated with Eon to produce the adaptation Thunderball (1965), and licensed Spectre and its characters to Eon for ten years, allowing their subsequent appearances in You Only Live Twice, On Her Majesty's Secret Service and Diamonds Are Forever.) McClory died in 2006, and in November 2013, MGM and the McClory estate formally settled the issue with Danjaq, sister company of Eon Productions—with MGM acquiring the full copyright film rights to the concept of Spectre and all of the characters associated with it. It has been suggested that with the acquisition of the film rights and the organisation's re-introduction to the series' continuity, the SPECTRE acronym was discarded and the organisation reimagined as "Spectre".

When Sony Pictures renegotiated with Metro-Goldwyn-Mayer the deal to cofinance the Bond franchise in 2011, they were tasked to provide 25% of the negative cost of both Skyfall and Spectre, in exchange for receiving 25% of the profits plus distribution fees for overseeing its worldwide rollout. When the film was announced in June 2013, the budget was not yet fixed, but was certain to be higher than the $210 million of Skyfall due to foreign locations and bigger payments for Mendes and Craig. In November 2014, Sony was targeted by hackers who released details of confidential e-mails between Sony executives regarding several high-profile film projects. Included within these were several memos relating to the production of Spectre, claiming that the film was over budget, detailing early drafts of the script written by John Logan, and expressing Sony's frustration with the project. Eon Productions later issued a statement confirming the leak of what they called "an early version of the screenplay". Eon resisted Sony and MGM's arguments to cut down on stunts and location work to reduce the budget but managed to secure tax incentives and rebates, such as $14 million from Mexico. Spectre has a final budget estimated between $250 million and $275 million.

=== Writing ===
Spectre marked the return of many scriptwriters from the previous Bond films, such as Skyfall writer John Logan; Neal Purvis and Robert Wade, who had done work in five previous Bond films; (Note: Purvis and Wade were credited for the screenplay of Quantum of Solace, as they wrote the original draft of the film. However, the final script was written by Paul Haggis, with several uncredited co-writers.) and British playwright Jez Butterworth, who had previously made uncredited contributions to Skyfall. Butterworth was brought in to polish the script, being helped by Mendes and Craig. Butterworth considered that his changes involved adding what he would like to see as a teenager, and limited the scenes with Bond talking to men, as "Bond shoots other men—he doesn't sit around chatting to them. So you put a line through that." With the acquisition of the rights to Spectre and its associated characters, Purvis and Wade revealed that the film would provide a minor retcon to the continuity of the previous films, with the Quantum organisation alluded to in Casino Royale and introduced in Quantum of Solace reimagined as a division within Spectre rather than an independent organisation which is implied to be no longer active by the film's events. The plot of Spectre also linked the events of Skyfall to Craig's first two Bond movies by revealing antagonist Raoul Silva to be associated with Spectre reverting Skyfall's initial solo story status. Various plot ideas were discussed and discarded during the writing process. For example, Ralph Fiennes revealed in a 2021 podcast interview that at one stage Sam Mendes suggested a plot twist revealing M to be the villain, which Fiennes vetoed. Another draft by Logan had MI6 chief of staff Bill Tanner uncovered as a Spectre mole.

Despite being an original story, Spectre draws on Ian Fleming's source material, most notably in the character of Franz Oberhauser, played by Christoph Waltz, and his father Hannes. Hannes Oberhauser is a background character in the short story "Octopussy" from the Octopussy and The Living Daylights collection, and is named in the film as having been a temporary legal guardian of a young Bond in 1983. As Mendes searched for events in young Bond's life to follow the childhood discussed in Skyfall, he came across Hannes Oberhauser, who becomes a father figure to Bond. From there, Mendes conceived the idea of "a natural child who had been pushed out, cuckoo in the nest" by Bond, which became Franz. Similarly, Charmian Bond is shown to have been his full-time guardian, observing the back story established by Fleming.

=== Casting ===
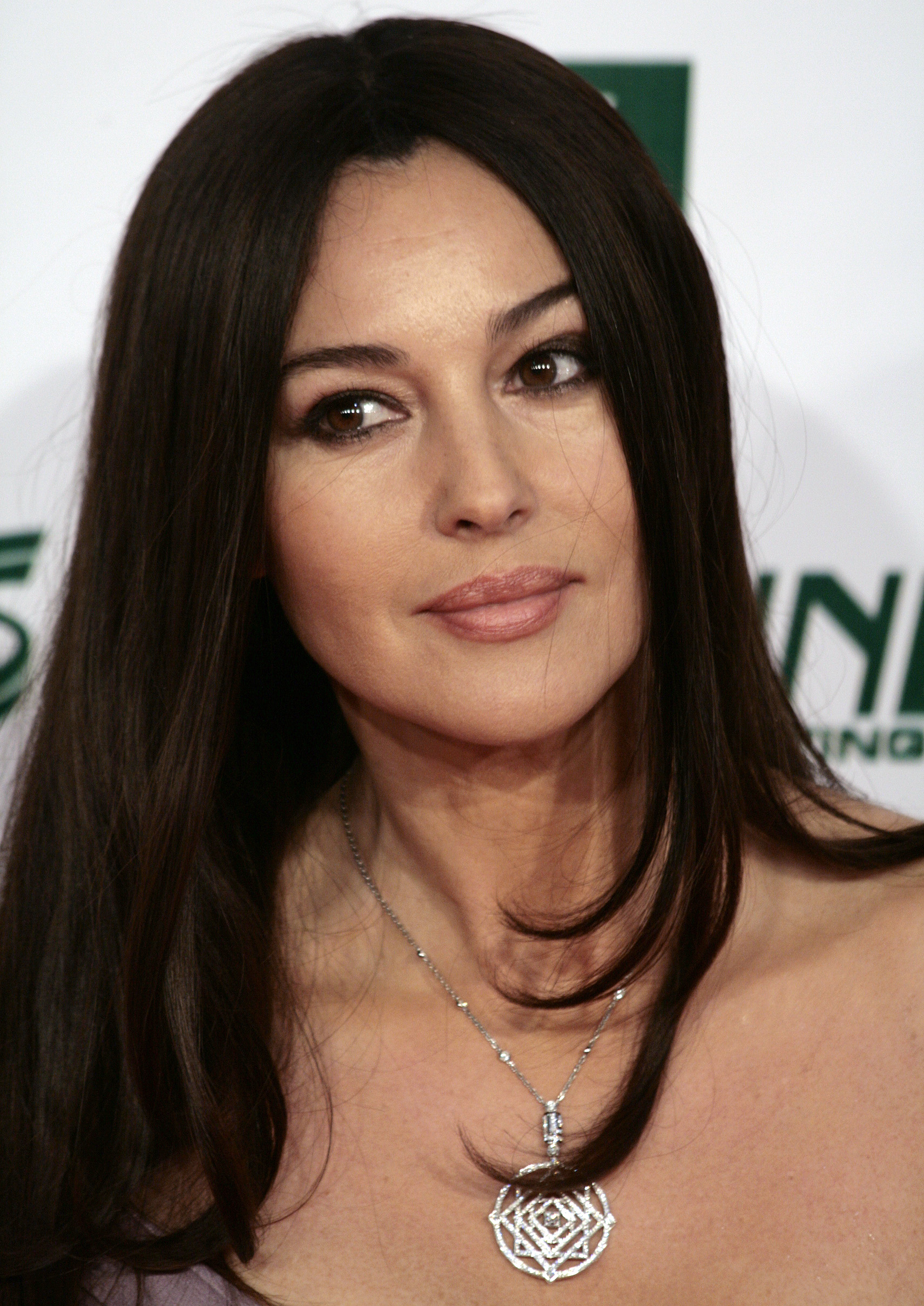
At the age of 50, Monica Bellucci became the oldest actress to be cast as a Bond girl.

The main cast was revealed in December 2014 at the 007 Stage at Pinewood Studios. Daniel Craig returned for his fourth appearance as James Bond, while Ralph Fiennes, Naomie Harris and Ben Whishaw reprised their roles as M, Eve Moneypenny and Q respectively, having been established in Skyfall. Rory Kinnear also reprised his role as Bill Tanner in his third appearance in the series.

Christoph Waltz was cast in the role of Franz Oberhauser, though he refused to comment on the nature of the part. It was later revealed with the film's release that he is Ernst Stavro Blofeld. Waltz got interested in the film for dealing with technology-assisted mass surveillance, "speaking about relevant social issues in a way that few Bonds have done before", and denied rumours that the role was written specially for him, but added that "when I came on board, the role grew, evolved, and mutated."

Dave Bautista was cast as Mr Hinx after producers sought an actor with a background in contact sports. The character only has one line in the entire film, the word "shit". Sam Mendes thought the silent nature would drive Bautista away, but the lifelong Bond fan expressed interest in reviving the quiet henchman archetype of characters, such as Oddjob from Goldfinger and Jaws from the Roger Moore era. Bautista said not talking created an acting challenge, "trying to find this way where I am actually going to have to speak without speaking." After casting Bérénice Marlohe, a relative newcomer, as Sévérine in Skyfall, Mendes sought out a more experienced actor for the role of Madeleine Swann, ultimately casting Léa Seydoux in the role. Monica Bellucci joined the cast as Lucia Sciarra, becoming, at the age of fifty, the oldest actress to be cast as a Bond girl. She had previously auditioned for the role of Paris Carver in Tomorrow Never Dies, but was passed over in favour of Teri Hatcher. In a separate interview with Danish website Euroman, Jesper Christensen revealed he would be reprising his role as Mr White from Casino Royale and Quantum of Solace. Christensen's character was reportedly killed off in a scene intended to be used as an epilogue to Quantum of Solace, before it was removed from the final cut of the film, enabling his return in Spectre.

In addition to the principal cast, Alessandro Cremona was cast as Marco Sciarra, Stephanie Sigman was cast as Estrella, and Detlef Bothe was cast as a villain for scenes shot in Austria. In February 2015 over 1,500 background artistes were hired for the pre-title sequence set in Mexico, though they were replicated in the film, giving the effect of around 10,000 extras.

=== Filming ===
Mendes revealed that production would begin on 8 December 2014 at Pinewood Studios, with filming taking seven months. Mendes also confirmed several filming locations, including London, Mexico City and Rome. Van Hoytema shot the film mostly on Kodak 35mm film stock (in addition to digital cameras such as the 6K Arri Alexa 65mm), in contrast to Skyfall being filmed solely on digital cameras. Early filming took place at Pinewood Studios, and around London, with scenes variously featuring Craig and Harris at Bond's flat, and Craig and Kinnear travelling down the River Thames.

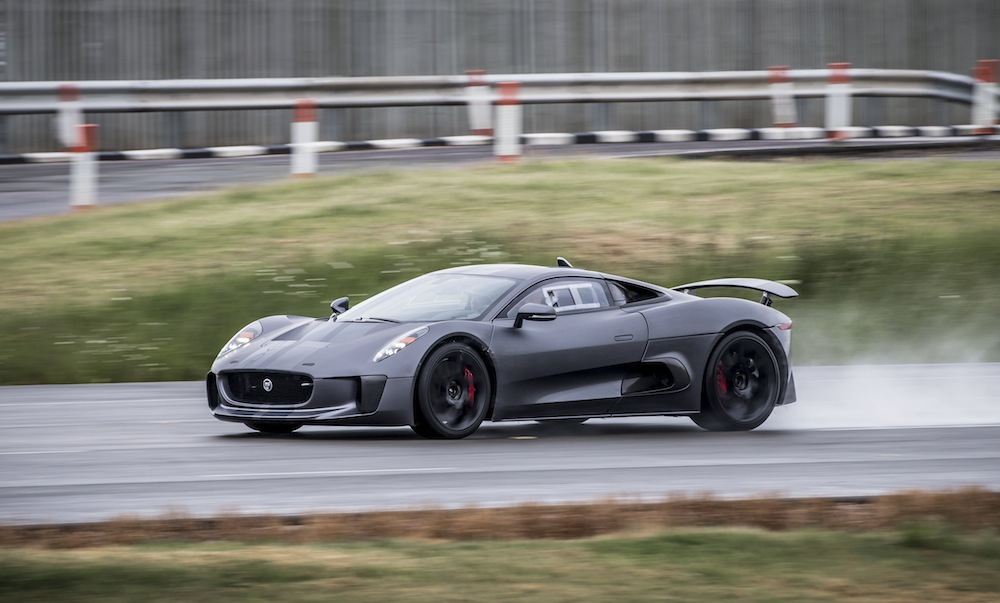
After being cancelled in 2012, the Jaguar C-X75 was recommissioned to appear in Spectre.

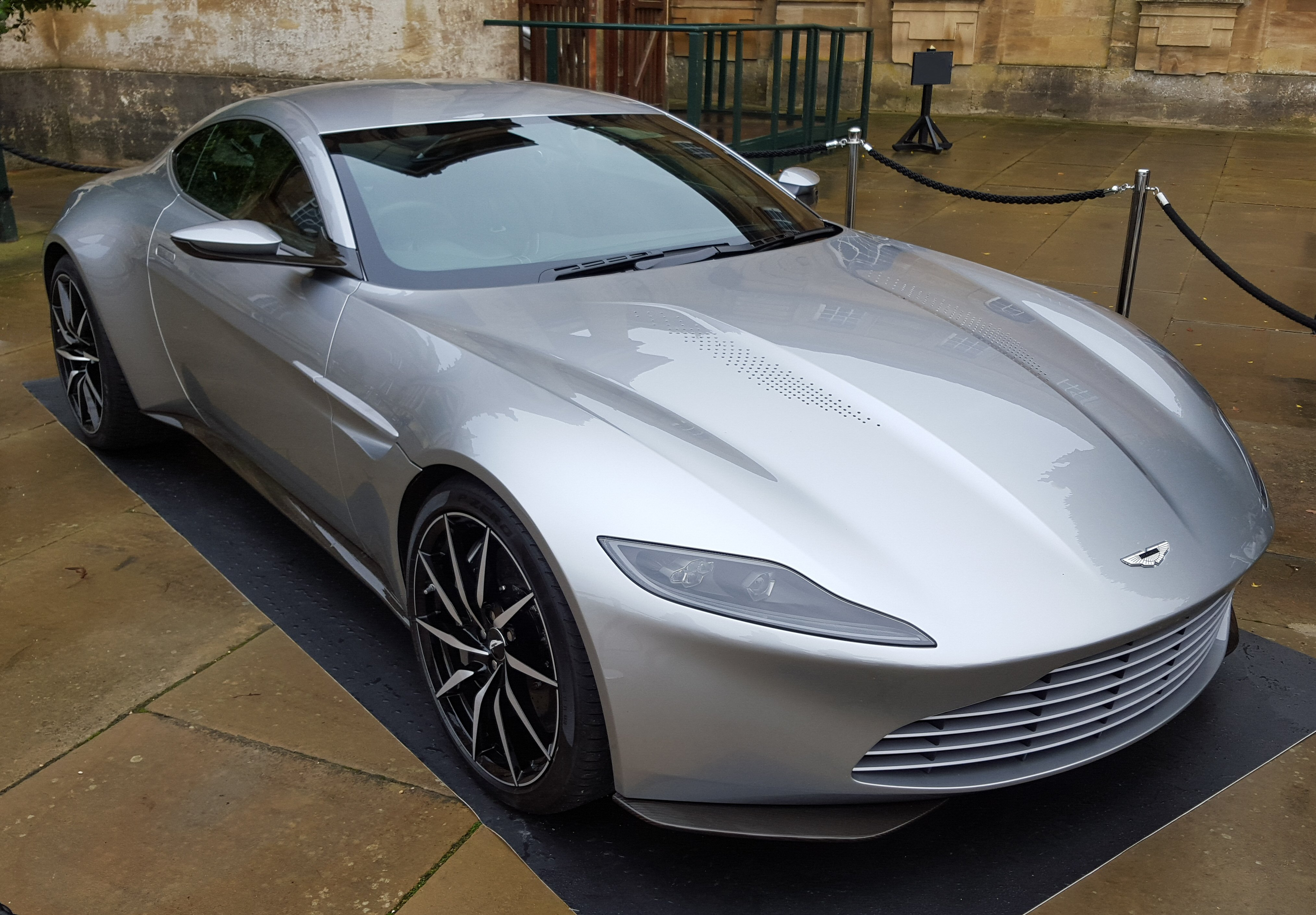
The Aston Martin DB10 is driven by Bond in the film.

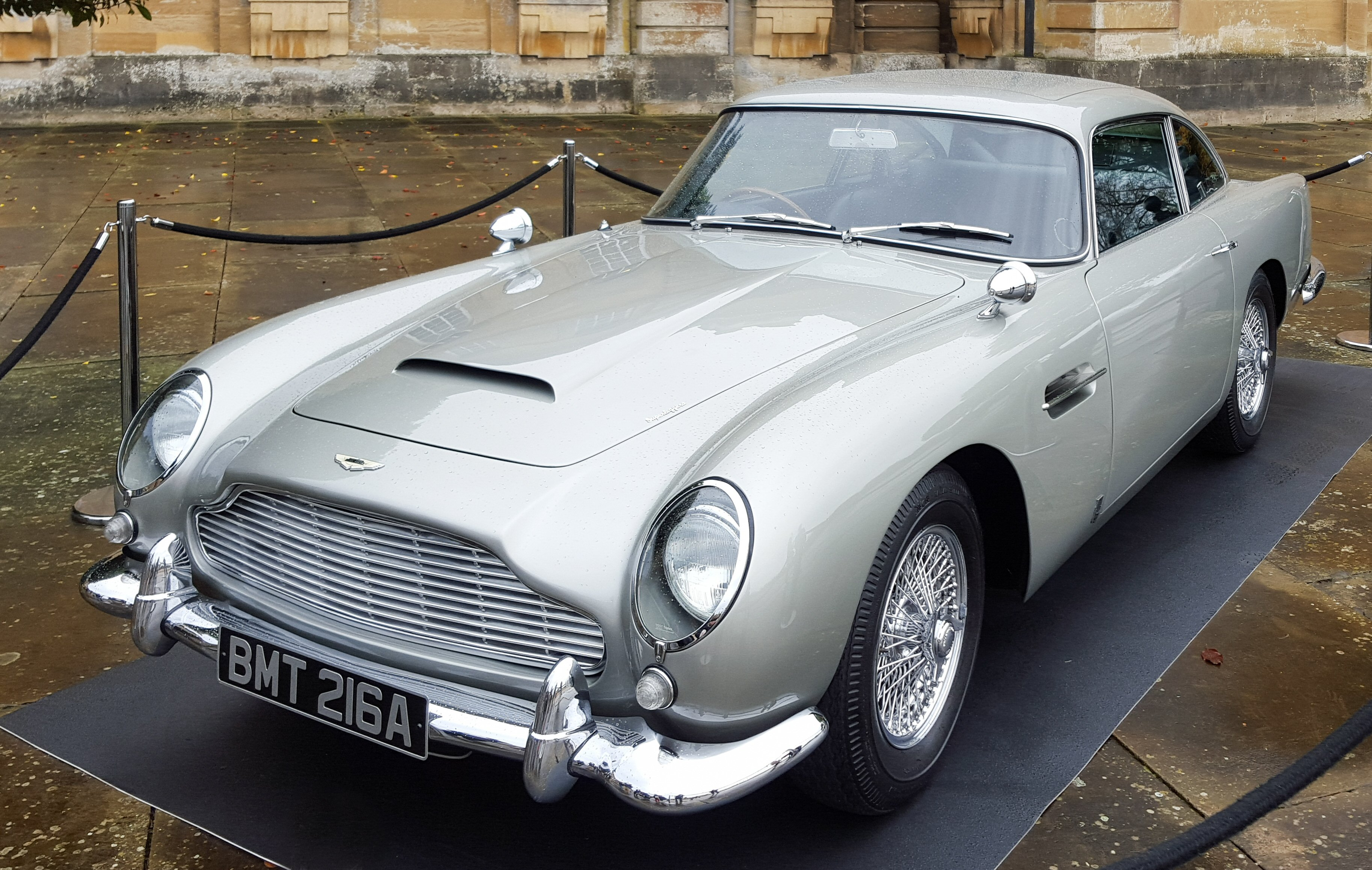
The Aston Martin DB5 reappears after reconstruction in Q's workshop at the film's ending, with Bond driving away with it.

Filming was carried out in Austria between December 2014 and February 2015, with production taking place in the area around Sölden—including the Ötztal Glacier Road, Rettenbach glacier and the adjacent ski resort plus cable car station—Obertilliach and Lake Altaussee. Scenes filmed in Austria centred on the Ice Q Restaurant, standing in for the fictional Hoffler Klinik, a private medical clinic in the Austrian Alps. Filming included an action scene featuring a Land Rover Defender Bigfoot and a Range Rover Sport. Various aeroplane models were used in filming, from a life-sized plane with detachable wings to film the crash in the woods, to plane fuselages either built atop snowmobiles or shot from nitrogen cannons. Production was temporarily halted first by an injury to Craig, who suffered a meniscus tear while shooting a fight scene with Bautista, and later by an accident involving a filming vehicle that saw three crew members injured, at least one of them seriously.

Filming temporarily returned to England to shoot scenes at Blenheim Palace in Oxfordshire, which stood in for a location in Rome, before moving on to the city itself for a five-week shoot across the city, with locations including the Ponte Sisto bridge and the Roman Forum. The production faced opposition from a variety of special interest groups and city authorities, who were concerned about the potential for damage to historical sites around the city, and problems with graffiti and rubbish appearing in the film. Special effects supervisor Chris Corbould stated the scenes had to be extensively planned prior to filming specially to avoid any mishaps, going to the point of building protection above steps where cars would drive. A car chase scene set along the banks of the Tiber River and through the streets of Rome featured an Aston Martin DB10 (a model developed especially for the film, with only 10 examples produced) and a Jaguar C-X75. The C-X75 was originally developed as a hybrid electric vehicle with four independent electric engines powered by two jet turbines, before the project was cancelled. The version used for filming was converted to use a conventional internal combustion engine, to minimise the potential for disruption from mechanical problems with the complex hybrid system. The C-X75s used for filming were developed by the engineering division of Formula One racing team Williams, who built the original C-X75 prototype for Jaguar. Remote driving pods were built above the cars so the vehicles could be driven while the cameras focused on Craig and Bautista at the steering wheel. According to chief stunt co-ordinator Gary Powell, filming the chase had the "risk of skidding into the Vatican", and led to "a record for smashing up cars in Spectre—seven Aston Martins in all," with the film's car expenses estimated at £24 million ($48 million).

With filming completed in Rome, production moved to Mexico City in late March to shoot the film's opening sequence. Scenes for the Day of the Dead festival were filmed in and around the Zócalo and the Centro Histórico district, including at the Gran Hotel Ciudad de México. At the time, no such Day of the Dead parade like the one from the film took place in Mexico City; in 2016, due to the interest raised by Spectre and the government's desire to promote the pre-Hispanic Mexican culture, the federal and local authorities decided to organise an actual Day of the Dead Parade, which was attended by 250,000 people and has since become an annual event. The film opens with a long take that joins six shots seamlessly, and was one of the few scenes that required previsualisation. Through extensive planning, filming did not require motion control cameras. The scene joints were done in post-production through re-timing and re-projections, which even matched Mexico locations with interiors filmed at Pinewood.

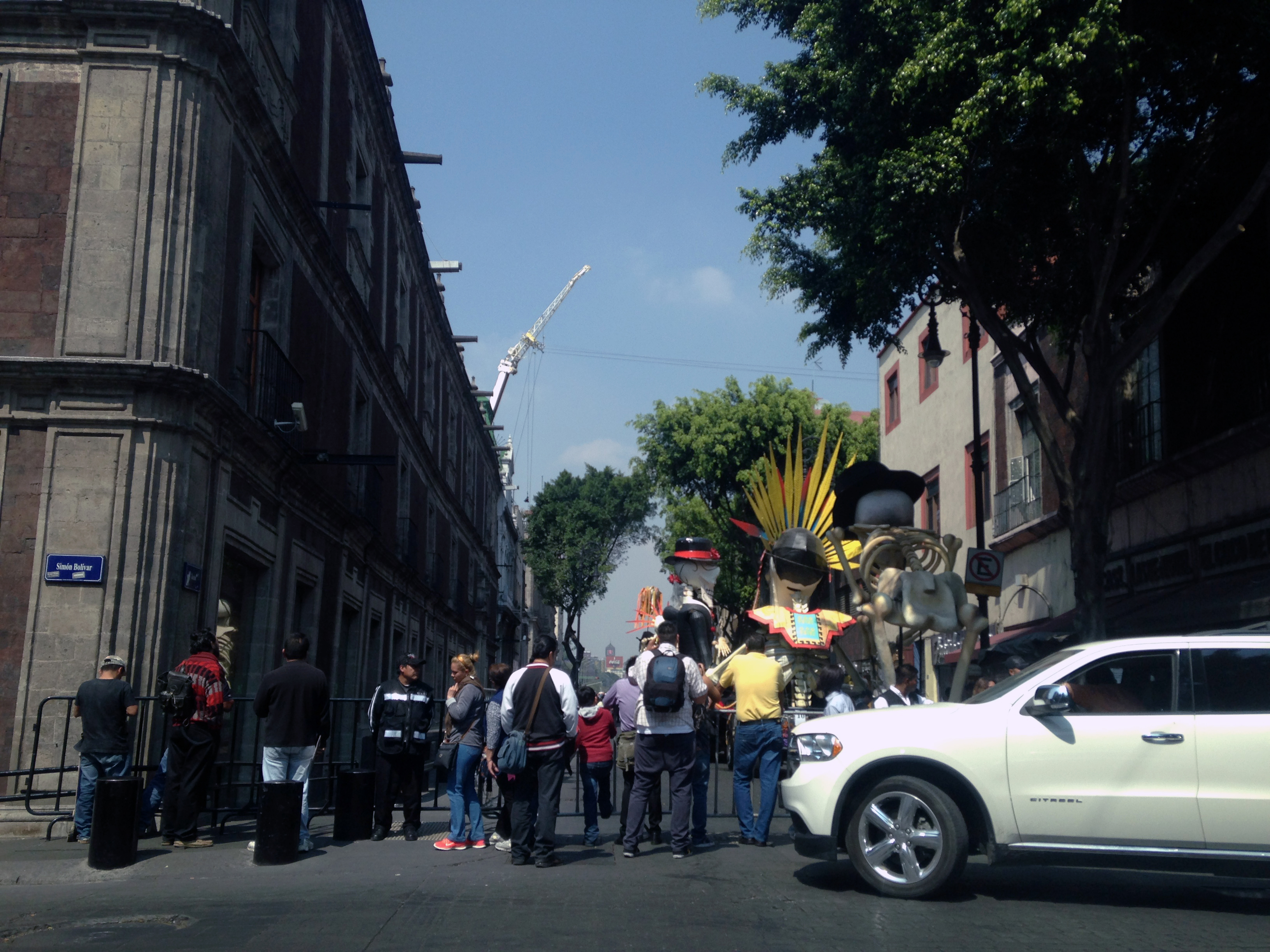
Filming of the Mexico City scenes, revolving around a Day of the Dead parade

The planned scenes required the city square to be closed for filming a sequence involving a fight aboard a Messerschmitt-Bölkow-Blohm Bo 105CBS helicopter flown by stunt pilot Chuck Aaron, which called for modifications to be made to several buildings to prevent damage. This particular scene in Mexico required 1,500 extras, 10 giant skeletons and 250,000 paper flowers. Reports in the Mexican media added that the film's second unit would move to Palenque in the state of Chiapas, to film aerial manoeuvres considered too dangerous to shoot in an urban area. These were pasted over a computer-generated square and crowd below the helicopter, with motion capture doubles fighting inside. Mendes and the effects team felt that this approach "would get believable composition and movement" compared to adding a digital helicopter above the Mexico City location. Following filming in Mexico, and during a scheduled break, Craig was flown to New York to undergo minor surgery to fix his knee injury. It was reported that filming was not affected and he had returned to filming at Pinewood Studios as planned on 22 April. Nonetheless, some parts of the Mexico scene were done with stunt doubles, whose faces were digitally replaced with Craig's.

On 17 May 2015 filming took place on the Thames in London. Stunt scenes involving Craig and Seydoux on a speedboat as well as a low flying helicopter near Westminster Bridge were shot at night, with filming temporarily closing both Westminster and Lambeth Bridges. Scenes were also shot on the river near MI6's headquarters at Vauxhall Cross. The crew returned to the river less than a week later to film scenes solely set on Westminster Bridge. The London Fire Brigade was on set to simulate rain as well as monitor smoke used for filming. Craig, Seydoux, and Waltz, as well as Harris and Fiennes, were seen being filmed. Prior to this, scenes involving Fiennes were shot at a restaurant in Covent Garden. Blofeld's helicopter crash was done with two full sized helicopter shells, which were rigged with steelwork and an overhead track. Computer-generated rotor blades and scenery damage were added in post-production. The MI6 building, which in the film is vacated and scheduled for demolition following the terrorist attack from Skyfall, was replaced in the production plates for a digital reconstruction. When the building is detonated, it is a combination of both a miniature and a breakaway version of the digital building.

After wrapping up in England, production travelled to Morocco in June, with filming taking place in Oujda, Tangier and Erfoud, after preliminary work was completed by the production's second unit. The headquarters of Spectre in Morocco was located in Gara Medouar which is a 'crater' caused by erosion and of neither volcanic nor impact origin. An explosion filmed in Morocco holds a Guinness World Record for the largest film stunt explosion in cinematic history, involving 8,140 litres of kerosene and 24 charges each with a kilogramme of high explosives. The outside shots of a train in a desert featured the Oriental Desert Express. Principal photography concluded on 5 July 2015. A wrap-up party for Spectre was held in commemoration before entering post-production. Filming took 128 days.

While filming in Mexico City, speculation in the media claimed that the script had been altered to accommodate the demands of Mexican authorities—reportedly influencing details of the scene and characters, casting choices, and modifying the script to portray the country in a "positive light"—to secure tax concessions and financial support worth up to $20 million for the film. This was denied by producer Michael G. Wilson, who stated that the scene had always been intended to be shot in Mexico as production had been attracted to the imagery of the Day of the Dead, and that the script had been developed from there. Production of Skyfall had previously faced similar problems while attempting to secure permits to shoot the film's pre-title sequence in India before moving to Istanbul.

Five companies did the visual effects—Industrial Light & Magic, Double Negative, Moving Picture Company, Cinesite and Peerless—under the supervision of Steve Begg. The computer-generated effects included set extensions, digital touches on the vehicles, and crumbling buildings. A sixth one, Framestore, handled the title sequence, the seventh in the series designed by Daniel Kleinman. It took four months to complete, and centred on an octopus motif reminiscent of the Spectre logo, along with images of love and relationships.

=== Soundtrack ===
Thomas Newman returned as Spectre's composer. Rather than composing during post-production, Newman worked during filming. The theatrical trailer released in July 2015 contained a rendition of John Barry's On Her Majesty's Secret Service theme. Mendes said the film would have more than 100 minutes of music. The soundtrack album was released on 23 October 2015 in the UK and 6 November in the US on Decca Records.

The English band Radiohead were commissioned to write the title song, and submitted "Man of War", an unreleased song written in the 1990s. It was rejected as it had not been written for the film and so was ineligible for the Academy Award for Best Original Song. Radiohead recorded another song, "Spectre", but this was also rejected as too melancholy. At the 2024 Ivor Novello Awards, Lana Del Rey told BBC News that she wrote her song "24" for Spectre, but it had been rejected.

In September 2015, Eon announced that Sam Smith had recorded the title theme, "Writing's on the Wall". Smith reported writing the song in a single session with regular collaborator Jimmy Napes in under half an hour before recording a demo. Satisfied with the quality, the filmmakers used the demo in the final release. "Writing's on the Wall" was released as a download on 25 September 2015. It received mixed reviews from critics and fans, particularly in comparison to Adele's "Skyfall", leading to Shirley Bassey trending on Twitter on the day it was released. Despite the mixed reception, it became the first Bond theme to reach number one in the UK Singles Chart, the second to win the Academy Award for Best Original Song, and the fifth to be nominated. (Note: The other four were "Skyfall" (2012), "For Your Eyes Only" (1981), "Nobody Does It Better" (1977), and "Live and Let Die" (1973).) It also won the Golden Globe Award for Best Original Song at the 73rd Golden Globe Awards.

== Marketing ==
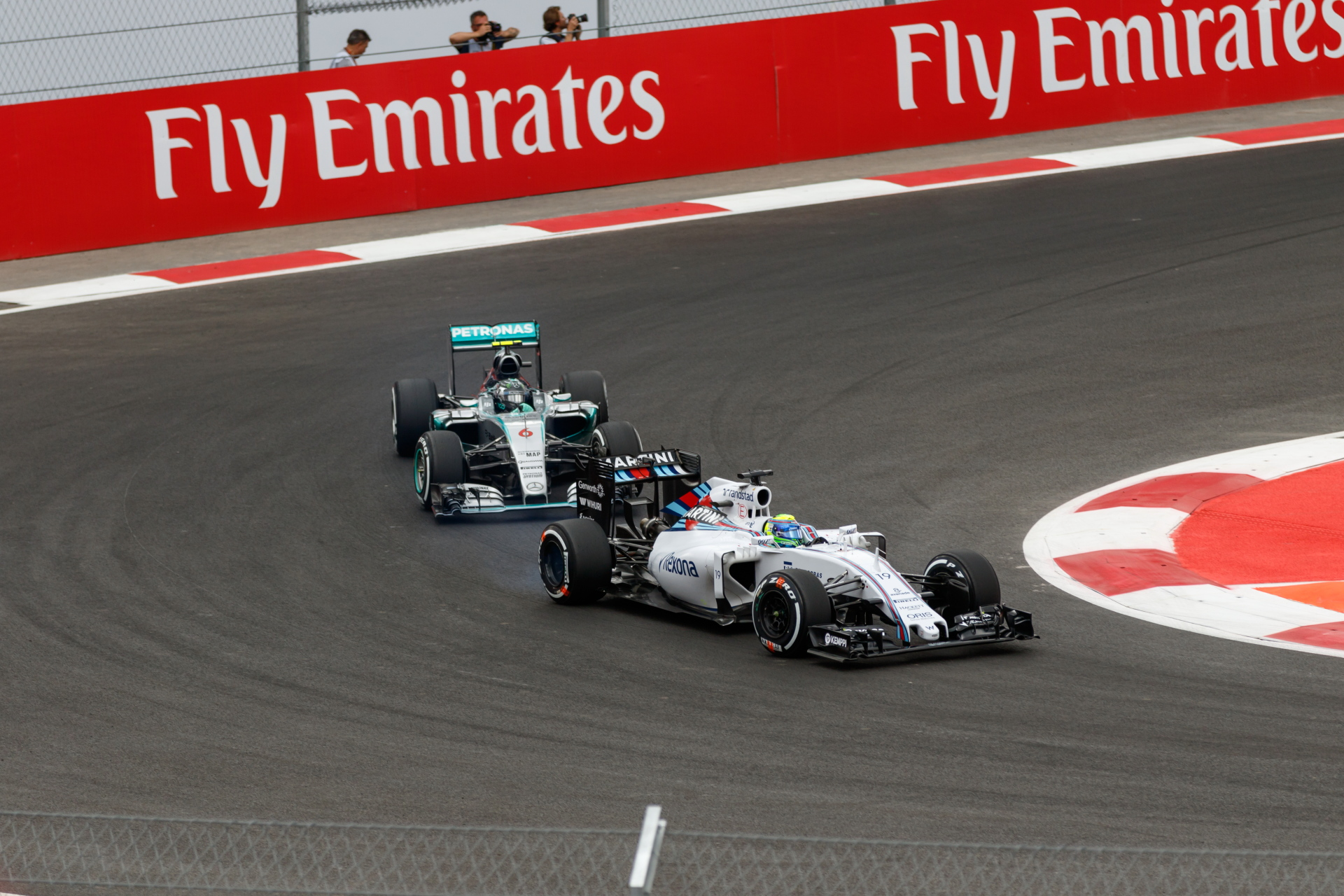
The Williams FW37 of Felipe Massa (front) carrying the 007 logo on its wing mirrors at the 2015 Mexican Grand Prix

During the December 2014 press conference announcing the start of filming, Aston Martin and Eon unveiled the new DB10 as the official car for the film. The DB10 was designed in collaboration between Aston Martin and the filmmakers, with only 10 being produced especially for Spectre as a celebration of the 50th anniversary of the company's association with the franchise. Only eight of those 10 were used for the film, however; the remaining two were used for promotional work. After modifying the Jaguar C-X75 for the film, Williams F1 carried the 007 logo on their cars at the 2015 Mexican Grand Prix, with the team playing host to the cast and crew ahead of the Mexican premiere of the film.

To promote the film, the film's marketers continued the trend established during Skyfall's production of releasing still images of clapperboards and video blogs on Eon's official social media accounts.

On 13 March 2015, several members of the cast and crew, including Craig, Whishaw, Wilson and Mendes, as well as previous James Bond actor, Sir Roger Moore, appeared in a sketch written by David Walliams and the Dawson Brothers for Comic Relief's Red Nose Day on BBC One. In the sketch, they film a behind-the-scenes documentary on the filming of Spectre. The first teaser trailer for Spectre was released worldwide in March 2015, followed by the theatrical trailer in July and the final trailer in October.

== Release ==
=== Theatrical ===
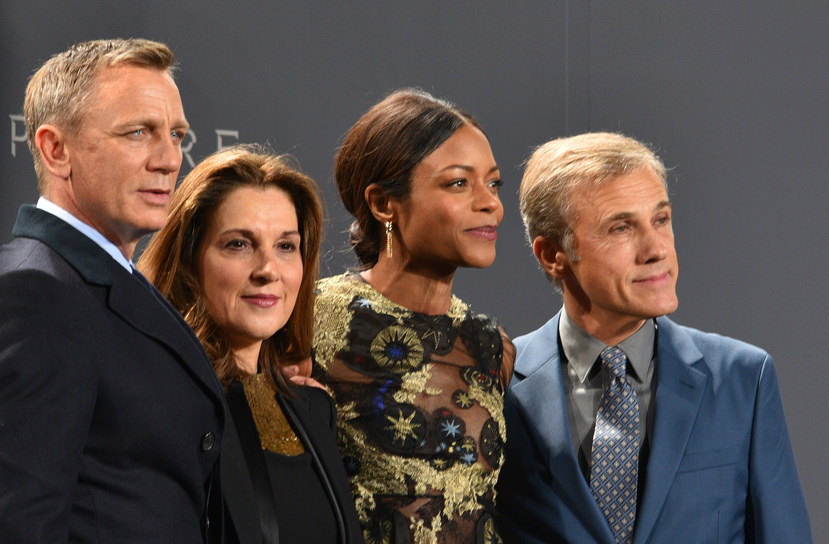
Daniel Craig, producer Barbara Broccoli, Naomie Harris and Christoph Waltz in a premiere for Spectre in Berlin

Spectre had its world premiere at the Royal Film Performance, an event in aid of the Film & TV Charity, in London on 26 October 2015 at the Royal Albert Hall, the same day as its general release in the United Kingdom and Republic of Ireland. It was released in the United States on 6 November. Following the announcement of the start of filming, Paramount Pictures brought forward the release of Mission: Impossible – Rogue Nation to avoid competing with Spectre. In March 2015 IMAX corporation announced that Spectre would be screened in its cinemas, following Skyfall's success with the company. In the UK it received a wider release than Skyfall, with a minimum of 647 cinemas including 40 IMAX screens, compared to Skyfall's 587 locations and 21 IMAX screens.

=== Home media ===
Spectre was released for Digital HD on 22 January 2016 and on DVD and Blu-ray on 9 and 22 February 2016 in the US and UK respectively. It debuted atop the home video charts in both countries, and finished 2016 with 1.5 million units in the UK, the second best-selling title of the year, behind only Star Wars: The Force Awakens, and 2 million copies in the US, 12th in the year-end charts.

The film was later released on Ultra HD Blu-ray on 22 October 2019 by 20th Century Fox Home Entertainment along with the previous three films, and standalone on 25 February 2020 in the US and 23 March 2020 in the UK.

== Reception ==
=== Box office ===
Spectre grossed $880.7 million worldwide; $135.5 million of the takings were generated from the UK market and $200.1 million from North America. Worldwide, this made it the second-highest-grossing James Bond film after Skyfall, and the sixth-highest-grossing film of 2015. Deadline Hollywood calculated the film's net profit as $98.4 million, accounting for production budgets, marketing, talent participations, and other costs; box office grosses and home media revenues placed it sixteenth on their list of 2015's "Most Valuable Blockbusters". Sony had expected the net profit of the film to be around $38 million had it performed to the same level of its predecessor, but it earned 20% less than Skyfall. Sony paid 50% of the production costs for the film—which totalled some $250 million after accounting for government incentives—but received only 25% of certain profits, once costs were recouped. The studio also spent tens of millions of dollars in marketing and had to give MGM some of the profit from the studio's non-Bond films, including 22 Jump Street.

In the United Kingdom, the film grossed £4.1 million ($6.4 million) from its Monday preview screenings. It grossed £6.3 million ($9.2 million) on its opening day and then £5.7 million ($8.8 million) on Wednesday, setting UK records for both days. In the film's first seven days it grossed £41.7 million ($63.8 million), breaking the UK record for highest first-week opening, set by Harry Potter and the Prisoner of Azkaban's £23.9 million ($36.9 million) in 2004. Its Friday–Saturday gross was £20.4 million ($31.2 million) compared to Skyfall's £20.1 million ($31 million). The film also broke the record for the best per-screen opening average with $110,000, a record previously held by The Dark Knight with $100,200. It has grossed a total of $136.3 million there. In the UK, it surpassed Avatar to become the country's highest-grossing IMAX release ever with $10.09 million.

Spectre opened in Germany with $22.5 million (including previews), which included a new record for the biggest Saturday of all time, Australia with $8.7 million (including previews) and South Korea opened to $8.2 million (including previews). Despite the 13 November Paris attacks, which led to numerous theatres being closed down, the film opened with $14.6 million (including $2 million in previews) in France. In Mexico, where part of the film was shot, it debuted with more than double that of Skyfall with $4.5 million. It also bested its predecessor's opening in various Nordic regions where MGM distributes, such as Finland ($2.7 million) and Norway ($2.9 million), and in other markets like Denmark ($4.2 million), the Netherlands ($3.4 million), and Sweden ($3.1 million). In India, it opened at No. 1 with $4.8 million which is 4% above the opening of Skyfall. It topped the German-speaking Switzerland box office for four weeks and in the Netherlands, it held the No. 1 spot for seven weeks straight where it topped Minions to become the top movie of the year. The top earning markets are Germany ($70.3 million) and France ($38.8 million). In Paris, it has the second-highest ticket sales of all time with 4.1 million tickets sold only behind Spider-Man 3 which sold over 6.3 million tickets in 2007.

In the United States and Canada the film opened on 6 November 2015, and in its opening weekend, was originally projected to gross $70–75 million from 3,927 screens, the widest release for a Bond film. However, after it grossed $5.3 million from its early Thursday night showings and $28 million on its opening day, weekend projections were increased to $75–80 million. The film ended up grossing $70.4 million in its opening weekend (about $20 million less than Skyfall's $90.6 million debut, including IMAX previews), but nevertheless finished first at the box office. IMAX generated $9.1 million for Spectre at 374 screens, premium large format made $8 million from 429 cinemas, reaping 11% of the film's opening, which means that Spectre earned $17.1 million (23%) of its opening weekend total in large-format venues. Cinemark XD generated $1.9 million in 112 XD locations.

In China, it opened on 12 November and earned $15 million on its opening day, which is the second biggest 2D single day gross for a Hollywood film behind the $18.5 million opening day of Mission: Impossible – Rogue Nation and occupying 43% of all available screens which included $790,000 in advance night screenings. Through its opening weekend, it earned $48.1 million from 14,700 screens which is 198% ahead of Skyfall, a new record for a Hollywood 2D opening. IMAX contributed $4.6 million on 246 screens, also a new record for a three-day opening for a November release (breaking Interstellar's record). In its second weekend, it added $12.1 million falling precipitously by 75% which is the second worst second weekend drop for any major Hollywood release in China of 2015. It grossed a total of $84.7 million there after four weekends (foreign films in the Middle Kingdom play for 30 days only, unless granted special extensions). Despite a strong opening, it failed to attain the $100 million mark there as projected due to mixed response from critics and audiences as well as facing competition from local films.

=== Critical response ===
Spectre has an approval rating of 63% based on 373 professional reviews on the review aggregator website Rotten Tomatoes, with an average rating of 6.4/10. Its critical consensus reads, "Spectre nudges Daniel Craig's rebooted Bond closer to the glorious, action-driven spectacle of earlier entries, although it's admittedly reliant on established 007 formula." Metacritic (which uses a weighted average) assigned Spectre a score of 60 out of 100 based on 48 critics, indicating "mixed or average" reviews. Audiences polled by CinemaScore gave the film an average grade of "A−" on an A+ to F scale.

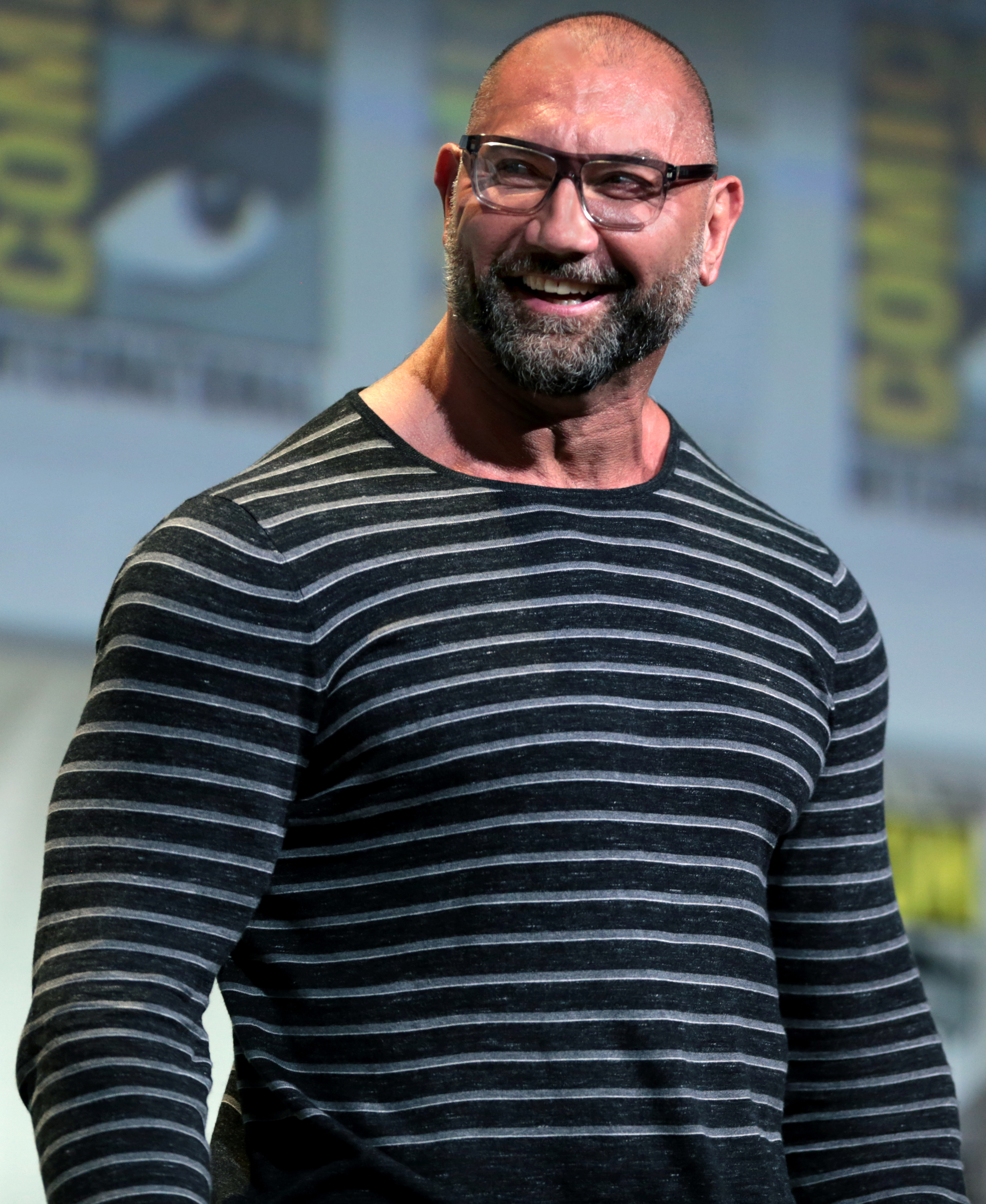
Dave Bautista was praised for his performance as Hinx.

Prior to its UK release, Spectre mostly received positive reviews. Mark Kermode, film critic for The Observer, gave the film four out of five stars, observing that the film did not live up to the standard set by Skyfall, but was able to tap into audience expectations. Writing in The Guardian, Peter Bradshaw gave the film a full five stars, calling it "inventive, intelligent and complex", and singling out Craig's performance as the film's highlight. In another five star review, The Daily Telegraph's Robbie Collin described Spectre as "a swaggering show of confidence'", lauding it as "a feat of pure cinematic necromancy". Positive yet critical assessments included Kim Newman of Sight and Sound, who wrote that "for all its wayward plotting (including an unhelpful tie-in with Bond's childhood that makes very little sense) and off-the-peg elements, Spectre works" as he felt "the audience's patience gets tested by two and a half hours of set-pieces strung on one of the series's thinner plots"; and IGN's Chris Tilly, who rated the film 7.2 out of 10, considering Spectre "solid if unspectacular", and concluding that "the film falls frustratingly short of greatness."

Critical appraisal was mixed in the United States. In a review for RogerEbert.com, Matt Zoller Seitz gave Spectre 2.5 out of 4, describing it as inconsistent and unable to capitalise on its potential. Kenneth Turan, reviewing the film for Los Angeles Times, concluded that Spectre "comes off as exhausted and uninspired". Manohla Dargis of The New York Times criticised the film as having "nothing surprising" and sacrificing its originality for the sake of box office returns. Forbes's Scott Mendelson also heavily criticised the film, denouncing Spectre as "the worst 007 movie in 30 years". Darren Franich of Entertainment Weekly viewed Spectre as "an overreaction to our current blockbuster moment", aspiring "to be a serialized sequel" and proving "itself as a Saga". While noting that "[n]othing that happens in Spectre holds up to even minor logical scrutiny", he had "come not to bury Spectre, but to weirdly praise it. Because the final act of the movie is so strange, so willfully obtuse, that it deserves extra attention." Christopher Orr, writing in The Atlantic, also criticised the film, saying that Spectre "backslides on virtually every [aspect]". Lawrence Toppman of The Charlotte Observer called Craig's performance "Bored, James Bored." Alyssa Rosenberg, writing for The Washington Post, stated that the film turned into "a disappointingly conventional Bond film."

In a positive review published in Rolling Stone, Peter Travers gave the film 3.5 stars out of 4, describing Spectre as "party time for Bond fans, a fierce, funny, gorgeously produced valentine to the longest-running franchise in movies". Mick LaSalle, writing for the San Francisco Chronicle, raved that "One of the great satisfactions of Spectre is that, in addition to all the stirring action, and all the timely references to a secret organisation out to steal everyone's personal information, we get to believe in Bond as a person." Stephen Whitty from The New York Daily News, who awarded the film four of five stars, stated that "Craig is cruelly efficient. Dave Bautista makes a good, Oddjob-like assassin. And while Lea Seydoux doesn't leave a huge impression as this film's 'Bond girl', perhaps it's because we've already met—far too briefly—the hypnotic Monica Bellucci, as the first real 'Bond woman' since Diana Rigg." Chicago Sun-Times film reviewer Richard Roeper, who gave the film three stars out of four, considered the film "solidly in the middle of the all-time rankings, which means it's still a slick, beautifully photographed, action-packed, international thriller with a number of wonderfully, ludicrously entertaining set pieces, a sprinkling of dry wit, myriad gorgeous women and a classic psycho-villain who is clearly out of his mind but seems to like it that way." Michael Phillips, reviewing for the Chicago Tribune, stated, "For all its workmanlike devotion to out-of-control helicopters, Spectre works best when everyone's on the ground, doing his or her job, driving expensive fast cars heedlessly, detonating the occasional wisecrack, enjoying themselves and their beautiful clothes." Variety film critic Guy Lodge complained in his review that "What's missing is the unexpected emotional urgency of Skyfall, as the film sustains its predecessor's nostalgia kick with a less sentimental bent."

=== Accolades ===
Accolades received by Spectre (2015 film)
Award	Date of ceremony	Category	Recipient(s)	Result	Ref.
Academy Awards	28 February 2016	Best Original Song	Sam Smith and Jimmy Napes for "Writing's on the Wall"	Won	
Alliance of Women Film Journalists Awards	12 January 2016	Most Egregious Age Difference Between Leading Man and Love Interest	Daniel Craig and Lea Seydoux	Nominated	
Art Directors Guild Awards	31 January 2016	Excellence in Production Design for a Contemporary Film	Dennis Gassner	Nominated	
Critics' Choice Movie Awards	17 January 2016	Best Song	"Writing's on the Wall"	Nominated	
Critics' Choice Movie Awards	17 January 2016	Best Actor in an Action Movie	Daniel Craig	Nominated	
Empire Awards	20 March 2016	Best British Film	Spectre	Won	
Empire Awards	20 March 2016	Best Thriller	Spectre	Won	
Golden Globe Awards	10 January 2016	Best Original Song	Sam Smith and Jimmy Napes for "Writing's on the Wall"	Won	
Hollywood Music in Media Awards	11 November 2015	Best Original Song in a Feature Film	Sam Smith and Jimmy Napes for "Writing's on the Wall"	Nominated	
Houston Film Critics Society Awards	9 January 2016	Best Original Song	"Writing's on the Wall"	Nominated	
Japan Academy Film Prize	4 March 2016	Outstanding Foreign Language Film	Spectre	Nominated	
Make-Up Artists and Hair Stylists Guild Awards	20 February 2016	Best Contemporary Hair Styling in a Feature-Length Motion Picture	Zoe Tahir	Nominated	
Satellite Awards	21 February 2016	Best Cinematography	Hoyte van Hoytema	Nominated	
Satellite Awards	21 February 2016	Best Original Score	Thomas Newman	Nominated	
Satellite Awards	21 February 2016	Best Original Song	Sam Smith and Jimmy Napes for "Writing's on the Wall"	Nominated	
Satellite Awards	21 February 2016	Best Visual Effects	Steve Begg and Chris Corbould	Nominated	
Satellite Awards	21 February 2016	Best Art Direction and Production Design	Dennis Gassner	Nominated	
Satellite Awards	21 February 2016	Best Film Editing	Lee Smith	Nominated	
Satellite Awards	21 February 2016	Best Sound (Editing and Mixing)	Per Hallberg, Karen Baker Landers, Scott Millan, Gregg Rudloff, and Stuart Wilson	Nominated	
Saturn Awards	22 June 2016	Best Action or Adventure Film	Spectre	Nominated	
St. Louis Film Critics Association Awards	20 December 2015	Best Song	"Writing's on the Wall"	Won	
Teen Choice Awards	31 July 2016	Choice Movie: Action	Spectre	Nominated	
Teen Choice Awards	31 July 2016	Choice Movie Actress: Action	Léa Seydoux	Nominated	
