= James Bond (Daniel Craig) =

Fictional character, 2006–2021

- James Bond character
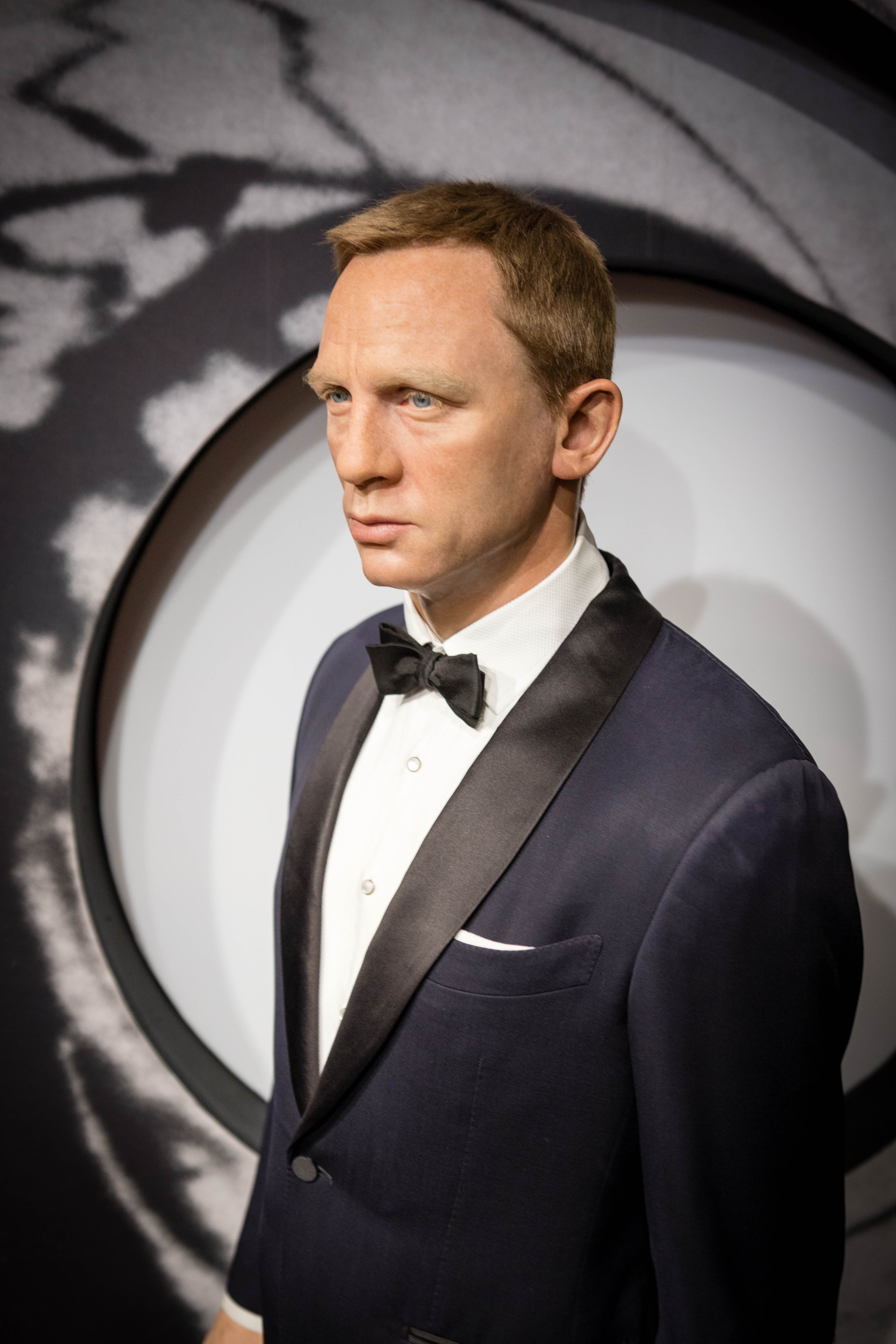
- Wax sculpture of the character at Madame Tussauds Blackpool
- First appearance: Casino Royale (2006)
- Last appearance: No Time to Die (2021)
- Based on: James Bond by Ian Fleming
- Adapted by: Neal Purvis Robert Wade; Paul Haggis
- Portrayed by: Daniel Craig

In-universe information
- Alias: 007
- Title: Commander (Royal Naval Reserve)
- Occupation: Intelligence agent
- Family: Andrew Bond (father); Monique Bond (mother); Charmain Bond (aunt)
- Significant others: Vesper Lynd; Madeleine Swann
- Children: Mathilde Swann
- Relatives: Hannes Oberhauser (adoptive father); Franz Oberhauser (adoptive brother)
- Nationality: British

James Bond, codename 007, is a fictional character and the titular protagonist of Eon Productions' rebooted James Bond film series, first introduced in the 2006 film Casino Royale. Portrayed by British actor Daniel Craig, this interpretation of the character, and the actor portraying him, received critical praise for a "caustic, haunted, intense reinvention of 007" – a darker, more realistic tone than the lighter characterisations portrayed in past Bond films.

The rebooted series spanned five films—Casino Royale (2006), Quantum of Solace (2008), Skyfall (2012), Spectre (2015), and No Time to Die (2021)—all starring Craig. This version of Bond is killed at the end of the lattermost film, making him, to date, the only version of the character in the Eon Productions James Bond films to die.

== Background ==
In 2004, two years after Pierce Brosnan's final screen appearance as Bond in Die Another Day, Eon Productions decided to reboot the James Bond franchise with an adaptation of Fleming's 1953 novel Casino Royale, the first novel in the Bond series. Producers Barbara Broccoli and Michael G. Wilson, who own the rights to the franchise and the character, decided to portray Bond, who had been an ageless character in 20 films since 1962's Dr. No, at the beginning of his career as 007, a secret agent in the British secret service agency MI-6 with the discretionary "license to kill". Paul Haggis, who co-wrote the script with Neal Purvis and Robert Wade, said that they wanted "to do for Bond what Batman Begins did for Batman".

In October 2005, Daniel Craig was cast as Bond for the first film in the reboot series, Casino Royale, after signing a deal to play the character in four films. Director Martin Campbell decided to cast Craig after seeing his performance in the 2004 thriller film Layer Cake.

The casting of the blond-haired, 5 feet 10 inches (178 cm) Craig was initially controversial, as the actor did not fit the traditional portrayal of Bond as "tall, dark, and handsome". After the film premiered, however, Craig won acclaim for his characterisation of Bond, with critics praising him for bringing both a dark, morally ambiguous edge to 007 and a humanity and vulnerability to the character that had not been seen in previous portrayals.

== Fictional character biography ==
=== Character's life prior to the films ===
The Craig reboot series borrowed several details of Bond's early life originally created by Fleming, while incorporating geopolitical events that occurred in the 1990s and 2000s. Like Fleming's original character, Bond is the son of Sir Andrew Bond and his wife Monique, both of whom died in a climbing accident when Bond was 12. Before the death of his parents, Bond was educated in Switzerland and in West Germany, where his father was stationed as a Vickers executive. Bond briefly lived in Skyfall Lodge, his family's ancestral home in Scotland, before being adopted by family friend Hannes Oberhauser. Following Oberhauser's death in an avalanche, Bond was raised by his aunt, Charmain Bond, and attended Britannia Royal Naval College.

After conducting a year of general sea service, Bond served as an intelligence officer aboard HMS Exeter during Operation Granby. He subsequently transferred to the SBS, during which he was attached to 030 Special Forces Unit, seeing covert service in Iraq, Somalia, Iran and Libya. In Bosnia, he was credited with saving the lives of nearly 100 men from a Serbian militia. He was recruited by the RNR Defence Intelligence Group and awarded the rank of Commander. His work provided vital intelligence during key moments with Libya, Iraq, Iran, Afghanistan, Cyprus, Indonesia, China and North Korea. In Libya, Bond was able to secure detailed assessments of the status of the Libyan government's reputed financial ties to numerous terrorist organizations. During his tenure at the RNR DI Group, he attended specialized courses at Cambridge (where he achieved a first in Oriental Languages), Oxford and other institutions. Bond left the RNR DI Group after recruitment by the Secret Intelligence Service (MI6) at the age of 30.

Bond then was appointed Senior Advisor at the British Embassy in Rome. He was promoted to Ops Specialist simultaneous with this posting. Although based nominally in Rome, his duties took him to Afghanistan, Pakistan, Iran, Lebanon, France, Spain, China, and the United States. He worked back-channel sources to aid in solving a minor crisis between the U.S. and China. Afterward, he was posted to the MI6 headquarters in London, where he continued to work as a Mission Specialist (within Black Ops) in such locations as Cuba, the United States, Austria, Spain, Russia, Ukraine, Uzbekistan, Sudan, and the UAE.

== Appearances ==
=== Films ===
==== Casino Royale ====
Bond is promoted to MI-6's "00" branch as agent 007, with a discretionary "license to kill", after assassinating corrupt MI-6 Section Chief Dryden (Malcolm Sinclair), who was selling state secrets, and his terrorist contact, Fisher (Darwin Shaw). Following a botched mission in Madagascar in which he kills bombmaker Mollaka Danso (Sébastien Foucan) and creates an international incident by blowing up an embassy, he is nearly fired by MI-6 Chief M (Judi Dench), but he redeems himself after foiling a terrorist bombing of an aerospace prototype.

M sends Bond to Casino Royale in Montenegro on a mission to bankrupt terrorist financier Le Chiffre (Mads Mikkelsen) in a high-stakes poker game to force him to give MI-6 information about his clients in return for political asylum. He is accompanied by French secret agent Rene Mathis (Giancarlo Giannini) and British Treasury agent Vesper Lynd (Eva Green); Bond and Vesper eventually fall in love.

During the poker game, Le Chiffre almost kills Bond by poisoning his drink with digitalis, but Vesper saves his life, and Bond ultimately wins the game and bankrupts Le Chiffre with additional financial backing from CIA agent Felix Leiter (Jeffrey Wright). Later that night, however, Le Chiffre kidnaps Bond and Vesper and reveals that Mathis is working for him. Le Chiffre tortures Bond for the password of the account in which his money has been stored, but terrorist liaison Mr. White (Jesper Christensen) interrupts and executes Le Chiffre for losing his clients' funds.

While recovering in a hospital in Venice, Bond has Mathis arrested, and decides to resign from MI-6 and start a new life with Vesper. Soon afterward, however, M calls him and reveals that the money from the poker tournament was never transferred back to MI-6, and Bond figures out that Vesper embezzled it. He finds Vesper handing the money over to a group of terrorists, who take her prisoner; he manages to kill Vesper's kidnappers, but he fails to stop her from committing suicide by drowning herself.

He deals with the loss by renouncing Vesper as a traitor, but M tells him that Vesper only betrayed him because the organisation behind Le Chiffre had kidnapped her boyfriend and threatened to kill him unless she did their bidding; she also reveals that Vesper made a deal with Le Chiffre's superiors to give them the money in return for sparing Bond's life. Bond finds Mr. White's name in Vesper's cell phone, tracks him to his home in Lake Como, and shoots him in the leg. As he takes White into custody, he introduces himself: "The name's Bond, James Bond."

==== Quantum of Solace ====
Bond turns White over to M, but White manages to escape with help from traitorous MI-6 agent Craig Mitchell (Glenn Foster), whom Bond kills.

Bond discovers that corrupt industrialist Dominic Greene (Mathieu Amalric) is working with White in the criminal organisation Quantum, which was the power behind Le Chiffre, to install exiled dictator Luiz Medrano (Joaquín Cosío) as the president of Bolivia to get exclusive rights to the country's water. Bond teams up with Mathis, who has been proven innocent, and Bolivian Intelligence agent Camille Montes (Olga Kurylenko) to stop Greene and Medrano.

However, Greene makes a deal with Leiter's corrupt CIA superior Gregg Beam (David Harbour) to send CIA and MI-6 agents out to kill them. Police officers working for Greene kill Mathis, and M reluctantly puts a capture or kill order out on Bond, who has been framed for his murder and that of MI-6 office worker (and Bond's lover) Strawberry Fields (Gemma Arterton).

Bond and Camille ultimately foil Greene's plot with help from Leiter, and Camille kills Medrano, who murdered her entire family right in front of her when she was a child. Bond interrogates Greene about the people he works for, and leaves him in the middle of the desert, where he is later murdered by Quantum agents.

After M proves to U.S. intelligence that Bond is innocent, Bond finds and apprehends Vesper's boyfriend Yusef Kabira (Simon Kassianides), a Quantum agent who seduces female intelligence operatives and pretends to be kidnapped so they will give Quantum top-secret information in the belief that it will save his life. Bond returns to active service, and learns to forgive Vesper and move on.

==== Skyfall ====
During a mission in Istanbul to recover a hard drive containing the identities of embedded secret agents, Bond is accidentally shot by fellow MI-6 agent Eve Moneypenny (Naomie Harris) and presumed dead. Bond in fact survives, but is seriously injured. He uses his supposed death to disappear into the Caribbean, where he abuses alcohol and painkillers to cope with his physical trauma.

When MI-6 headquarters are bombed, however, he offers his services to M to find the culprit, even though he blames her for giving the order that resulted in his getting shot. Even though Bond fails the physical and psychological tests needed to be cleared for duty, M sends him to Shanghai to investigate the attack.

He finds the mastermind of the bombing, former MI-6 agent turned cyberterrorist Raoul Silva (Javier Bardem), who holds a grudge against M for turning him over to the Chinese government years earlier in exchange for the return of several captured agents and a peaceful transition of sovereignty. Bond manages to capture Silva, but he escapes and tries, unsuccessfully, to kill M during a government deposition.

Bond takes M to Skyfall to wait for Silva and reunites with the estate's keeper, Kincaide (Albert Finney), whom he has not seen since he was a boy. That night, Silva and his men open fire on Skyfall, mortally wounding M, but Bond repels their attack by setting off explosives within the estate. Bond kills Silva, but he is too late to save M, who dies in his arms. Bond returns to the new MI-6 headquarters to report to Gareth Mallory (Ralph Fiennes), the new M, for duty.

==== Spectre ====
Bond goes on an unauthorised mission to foil a terrorist bombing in Mexico City, the last order issued by the previous M before her death. Bond kills the perpetrator, Marco Sciarra (Alessandro Cremona), who is wearing a skeleton-shaped ring that is linked to a mysterious organisation called Spectre.

M suspends Bond from service for disobeying orders, while Joint-Intelligence Service Director Max Denbigh (Andrew Scott) tries to shut down the 00 section and replace it with a global surveillance program called "Nine Eyes". Bond goes rogue to find Sciarra's employers, with covert help from Moneypenny and MI-6 quartermaster Q (Ben Whishaw). With the assistance of Sciarra's widow Lucia (Monica Bellucci), Bond infiltrates a secret meeting of Spectre's leaders, and is stunned to discover that the organisation is led by Franz Oberhauser (Christoph Waltz), his adoptive brother who was presumed to have died 20 years earlier.

Bond discovers that Mr. White is in fact a member of Spectre, and finds him in Austria, where his old foe is dying of thallium poisoning. White implores Bond to protect his daughter, Madeleine Swann (Léa Seydoux), from Spectre before killing himself. Bond saves Madeleine from Oberhauser's thugs, while Q reveals that Le Chiffre, Greene, and Silva were all Spectre agents.

Bond and Madeleine find Oberhauser's secret base in the Sahara. Oberhauser himself greets them and explains that, after killing his father, Hannes, and faking his own death, he reinvented himself as terrorist mastermind Ernst Stavro Blofeld, and that he has been working with Denbigh to gain unfettered access to the world's surveillance data. He also reveals that he has spent years waging a vendetta against Bond, whom he hates for having been Hannes' favorite.

Blofeld imprisons Bond in a neurosurgical chair, intent on removing his eyes, but Bond destroys the chair with an exploding watch given to him by Q, which disfigures Blofeld. Bond and Madeleine destroy Blofeld's base, although Blofeld manages to escape.

In London, Spectre agents kidnap Bond and Madeleine, and bring them both before Blofeld in the former MI-6 headquarters, which is set for demolition in a matter of minutes. Blofeld gloats that Bond will have to choose between saving himself and rescuing Madeleine, but Bond manages to save Madeleine and get them both out of the building before it is destroyed. Meanwhile, M and Q kill Denbigh and stop the Nine Eyes program from going online, thus thwarting Blofeld's plan. Bond then subdues Blofeld, but decides to spare his life, before driving off into the sunset with Madeleine.

==== No Time to Die ====
One year later, Bond has retired from MI-6 and is living with Madeleine in Matera. At her insistence, Bond visits Vesper's grave, where he is unexpectedly attacked by Spectre assassin Primo (Dali Benssalah). He finds a voicemail on Madeleine's phone from Blofeld, thanking her for helping set Bond up. Feeling betrayed, Bond ends their relationship and sends her away on a train, even as she protests her innocence.

Five years later, Bond is living in Jamaica, where he is contacted by Leiter; his old friend asks him for help rescuing corrupt MI-6 scientist Valdo Obruchev (David Dencik), who has seemingly been kidnapped by Spectre. Bond turns him down, but he changes his mind after encountering MI-6 agent Nomi (Lashana Lynch), his successor as 007, who warns him not to interfere with her own efforts to find Obruchev. Bond returns to MI-6, where M informs him that Spectre kidnapped Obruchev after the scientist developed a DNA-targeted nanobot weapon called Project Heracles.

Bond infiltrates a Spectre meeting with help from Leiter's fellow CIA agent Paloma (Ana de Armas), where the nanobot weapon is unleashed, killing every one of Spectre's ranking agents. Paloma then brings Bond to Obruchev, who is in the custody of Leiter and U.S. State Department agent Logan Ash (Billy Magnussen), who is secretly in league with terrorist Lyutsifer Safin (Rami Malek), the true mastermind of the theft of Project Heracles. Ash mortally wounds Leiter and flees with Obruchev, who is also working for Safin. Bond escapes after Leiter dies in his arms.

Bond goes to Belmarsh Prison to interrogate Blofeld and unexpectedly runs into Madeleine, with whom he has a tense reunion. She unknowingly passes on the nanobots to Bond, having earlier been accosted by Safin, who murdered her mother when she was a child as revenge for Mr. White murdering his entire family on Blofeld's orders. Bond questions Blofeld, who reveals that Madeleine had nothing to do with the attempt on Bond's life, and that he only left a message on her phone to torment him. Enraged, Bond tries to strangle Blofeld, inadvertently transferring the nanobots onto him and killing him.

Bond goes with Madeleine to her childhood home in Norway, where he meets her five-year-old daughter Mathilde, whom she insists is not his child. They nevertheless reconcile, and she shares intelligence her father had gathered about Safin and the island his family owned. The next day, however, they are attacked by Safin, Ash, and their men, and are forced to flee. Bond kills Ash, but Safin kidnaps Madeleine and Mathilde.

With virtual help from M, Moneypenny, and Q, Bond and Nomi infiltrate Safin's headquarters, an abandoned missile silo. Bond kills Primo, while Nomi kills Obruchev and escapes the island with Madeleine and Mathilde. Bond opens the silo's doors to allow MI-6 to launch a missile strike and destroy Project Heracles, with which Safin plans to kill millions of people and usher in a new world order of terrorism. Safin ambushes him and infects him with the nanobots, and gloats that he ordered Obruchev to reprogram it to kill Madeleine and Mathilde. Bond shoots Safin dead, and decides to stay on the island and die to keep Madeleine and Mathilde safe.

Bond contacts Madeleine to say goodbye and tell her that he loves her, and she tearfully reveals that Mathilde is in fact his child. Bond smiles and says "I know" as the missile strike hits the silo, killing him and destroying Project Heracles. Soon afterward, Bond's MI-6 colleagues drink to his memory, while Madeleine tells Mathilde a story about "a man named Bond... James Bond".

=== Video games ===
Craig lent his voice and likeness to four James Bond video games created by Activision: 007: Quantum of Solace (2008), GoldenEye 007 (2010), James Bond 007: Blood Stone (2010), and 007 Legends (2012, likeness only).

== Casting ==
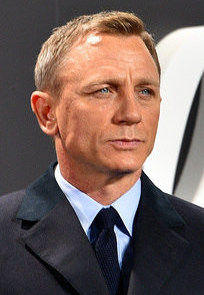
Daniel Craig in 2015

After Pierce Brosnan, who had portrayed Bond since 1995's GoldenEye, retired from the role in February 2004, several actors were considered for the part, including Karl Urban, Goran Višnjić, Sam Worthington, Dougray Scott, and Henry Cavill.

In October 2005, British actor Daniel Craig was cast as James Bond in Casino Royale, an adaptation of Ian Fleming's 1953 novel of the same name, which introduced the Bond character. Craig read all of Fleming's novels to prepare for the part, and cited as influences the Mossad and British Secret Service agents who served as advisers on the set of Steven Spielberg's 2005 film Munich, in which he played a supporting role.

Craig was initially a controversial choice to portray Bond, with some critics and fans protesting that he did not fit Fleming's characterisation of 007 as "tall, dark, and handsome"; there were even Internet campaigns, such as "danielcraigisnotbond.com", threatening to boycott the film.

== Reception ==
=== Casino Royale ===
Casino Royale was a critical and commercial success, and Craig's performance as Bond was universally praised, despite the earlier controversy about his suitability for the part. Some newspaper columnists and critics considered Craig's performance worthy of an Academy Award nomination.

Critics praised Craig for making Bond a more complex, morally ambiguous character than previous 007s. Roger Ebert of the Chicago Sun-Times, who gave Casino Royale four stars out of four, wrote that "Craig makes a superb Bond ... who gives the sense of a hard man, wounded by life and his job, who nevertheless cares about people and right and wrong." Time Out New York's Joshua Rothkopf called Craig "the best Bond in the franchise's history... This is a screwed-up Bond, a rogue Bond, a bounder, a scrapper and, in the movie's astoundingly bleak coda, an openhearted lover." Paul Arendt of BBC Films wrote, "Daniel Craig is not a good Bond. He's a great Bond. Specifically, he is 007 as conceived by Ian Fleming—a professional killing machine, a charming, cold-hearted patriot with a taste for luxury. Craig is the first actor to really nail 007's defining characteristic: he's an absolute swine."

Four of the previous actors to have portrayed James Bond – Sean Connery, Roger Moore, Timothy Dalton, and Pierce Brosnan – all praised Craig's performance. Moore in particular called Craig's Bond "the Bond", the definitive version of the character.

=== Quantum of Solace ===
Craig's performance in the following film in the series, Quantum of Solace, was also critically praised, even as the film itself received mixed reviews. Peter Bradshaw of The Guardian wrote, "Quantum of Solace isn't as good as Casino Royale: the smart elegance of Daniel Craig's Bond debut has been toned down in favour of conventional action. But the man himself powers this movie; he carries the film: it's an indefinably difficult task for an actor. Craig measures up." Shawn Levy of The Oregonian wrote, "Craig is a substantial actor who convinces us at once of the character's human pain and animal ferocity". Craig himself, however, described his performance in Quantum of Solace as his least favourite of all of the Bond films he appeared in.

=== Skyfall ===
Craig won widespread critical acclaim for his performance as an embittered, physically vulnerable Bond in Skyfall, his third appearance in the franchise. Ryan Gilbey of The New Statesman praised Craig for having "relaxed into Bond without losing any steeliness". Todd McCarthy of The Hollywood Reporter wrote of Craig, "He owns Bond now, and the role is undoubtedly his for as long as he might want it." Philip French of The Guardian wrote that Craig "manages to get out of the shadow of Connery", while Daniel Krupa of IGN called Craig's performance "defining", praising the actor for playing Bond as "brutal when he needs to be, and charming and suave when the situation arises".

=== Spectre ===
Upon the release of 2015's Spectre, the fourth Bond film starring Craig, some critics remarked that his performance suggested that he was growing tired of the role. Craig, who broke his leg during filming, expressed frustration with the franchise during an interview with Time Out, saying he would "rather slash [his] wrists" than star in another Bond film, and that he wanted to "move on" from the part.

Even critics who praised Craig's performance in the film noted that the role was wearing thin. Richard Roeper of the Chicago Sun-Times called Craig a "tightly coiled, deadpan funny, hardcore charmer", but opined that "Bond looks weary and battle-scarred, and he's getting a bit sloppy in his work". Lawrence Toppman of the Charlotte Observer characterised Craig's performance in the film as "Bored, James Bored", while Kenneth Turan of the Los Angeles Times wrote that "Craig... seems to be feeling increasingly strait-jacketed as Bond".

=== No Time to Die ===
For Craig's final film as James Bond, he portrayed the secret agent as having been retired and out of action for five years when he decides to engage once more with a world of espionage that has moved on without him. Director Cary Joji Fukunaga compared Bond to a "wounded animal" and described his state of mind as "struggling to deal with his role as a '00 agent'. The world's changed. The rules of engagement aren't what they used to be. The rules of espionage are darker in this era of asymmetric warfare".

Critics praised Craig for playing an older, wiser Bond. Jason Solomons of TheWrap wrote that Craig "may well have delivered the most complex and layered Bond performance of them all," and that "You feel all the wear and tear on Craig's body and face, all the strain on Bond of having to save the world one last time (again) yet also all the tantalizing freedom of someone approaching the end of a long run." John Nugent of Empire wrote, "Craig can still wear the hell out of a tux, but he has a few more years on his face than he did in 2006's Casino Royale, and plays into them. His performance — which has always been rich with contradictions, the playboyish smile contrasted with a stoic inner turmoil — is the most interesting it has ever been in this film. This Bond is more passionate, more impulsive, more sensitive and — dare we say — more romantic, breathing remarkable new dimensions into a decades-old character."

Regarding Bond's death at the end of the film, Craig explained that he had first brought up the possibility of eventually killing Bond off with producer Barbara Broccoli in 2006, following the release of Casino Royale. He also commented that Bond sacrificing his life to protect his loved ones made for what he considered a perfect end to the character's journey: "The sacrifice that he makes in the movie was for love and there's no greater sacrifice. So it seemed like a good thing to end on."
