= Madeleine Swann =

Character in James Bond films

- James Bond character
- Léa Seydoux as Madeleine Swann
- First appearance: Spectre (2015)
- Last appearance: No Time to Die (2021)
- Portrayed by: Léa Seydoux; Coline Defaud (young)

In-universe information
- Gender: Female
- Affiliation: Hoffler Klinik; Belmarsh Prison
- Family: Mr. White (father)
- Significant other: James Bond
- Children: Mathilde Swann
- Classification: Bond girl

Madeleine Swann is a character in the James Bond films Spectre (2015) and No Time to Die (2021), played by actress Léa Seydoux. She is one of only two Bond girls to appear in two films (Note: After Sylvia Trench, who appeared in Dr. No and From Russia with Love) and first in the film series to have a child with James Bond (Daniel Craig). (Note: Kissy Suzuki bore Bond's child in the novel You Only Live Twice, but not in the film version.)

== Character biography ==
Madeleine Swann (Léa Seydoux) is introduced in the 2015 James Bond film Spectre. She is the daughter of Mr. White (Jesper Christensen), a member of the criminal organization SPECTRE.

Swann studied at the University of Oxford and at Sorbonne University, and later worked with Doctors Without Borders. By the time of Spectre she is working as a psychiatrist at a private clinic in the Austrian Alps.

Dying of thallium poisoning, White tells James Bond (Daniel Craig) to protect his daughter from SPECTRE, so Bond goes to see her at the clinic. Although Swann is initially hesitant to trust Bond, she agrees to share information about SPECTRE and help Bond take the organization down. The two gradually fall in love, and Bond ultimately leaves MI6 to be with her after arresting Ernst Stavro Blofeld (Christoph Waltz).

In No Time to Die, Bond and Swann travel to Matera. Swann suggests Bond visit Vesper Lynd's (Eva Green) grave to get closure in his deceased lover's death. Bond does so, and while there notices a card placed by the side of the grave with the SPECTRE symbol. As he picks it up, a bomb detonates, and SPECTRE agents ambush him. Bond escapes, but hears a message from Blofeld on Swann's phone thanking her for her help setting Bond up. Believing she has betrayed him, Bond leaves her at a train station, declaring that they will never see each other again.

Five years later, Swann is now working as a psychiatrist at Belmarsh Prison, and is the only doctor Blofeld will speak to. Terrorist Lyutsifer Safin (Rami Malek), seeking revenge for White murdering his entire family on Blofeld's orders, visits Swann and tries to coerce her into assassinating Blofeld with nanobot weaponry developed by corrupt MI6 scientist Valdo Obruchev (David Dencik). Madeleine obliges, but is too scared to meet him, so she decides to leave Blofeld alone with Bond. However, she unintentionally passes the nanobots on to Bond when they reunite to track down Safin. Bond interrogates Blofeld, who reveals that he framed Madeleine for trying to kill him; an enraged Bond tries to strangle Blofeld, unintentionally infecting him with the nanobots and killing him.

Later, Bond and Madeleine reconcile when he tracks her to her childhood home. Bond meets her five-year-old daughter, Mathilde (Lisa-Dorah Sonnet), but Madeleine denies that she is his child. Safin, having become obsessed with Madeleine, kidnaps her and Mathilde and brings them to his island fortress. Bond is able to kill Safin and rescue Madeleine and Mathilde, but he is infected with Safin's nanotechnology in the process. Because the nanotechnology would kill Madeleine and Mathilde if they were ever exposed to it, Bond decides to sacrifice himself by staying behind on Safin's island as MI6 missiles hurtle toward it. Before he dies, Bond calls Madeleine to say goodbye, and Madeleine confirms that he is in fact Mathilde's father. The film ends with Madeleine driving Bond's black Aston Martin V8 with Mathilde in Italy and telling her the story of "a man named Bond, James Bond."

== Production ==
The filmmakers originally looked for a "blonde, Scandinavian" actress to play the part of Madeleine, before casting their net wider to include French and German actresses as well, whereupon they chose Seydoux.

Madeleine Swann's name is a tribute to Marcel Proust's In Search of Lost Time; the first volume is called Swann's Way, and it includes an episode in which the narrator enjoys a Madeleine cake.

Unlike most Bond girls, Madeleine Swann is a full-fledged love interest for James Bond who appears in multiple films. Prior to Swann, Bond had fallen in love with only Tracy di Vicenzo (Diana Rigg) in On Her Majesty's Secret Service, and Vesper Lynd (Eva Green) in Casino Royale. Both Tracy and Vesper die early in their relationships with Bond, and this reoccurring tragic outcome was used to create tension in No Time to Die regarding Madeleine's fate. Ultimately, the trope is subverted when Bond himself dies instead of Madeleine.

== Reception ==
Léa Seydoux received positive reviews for her portrayal of Madeleine. British Vogue said "the French actor's capable and complex creation was [a] perfect match" for Daniel Craig's Bond. Seydoux was nominated for a 2016 Teen Choice Awards in the Choice Movie Actress: Action category for her portrayal of Madeleine in Spectre. ScreenRant called Madeleine Swann the "bravest" Bond girl in the franchise.

Thomas Lethbridge suggests that Bond's relationship with Madeleine parallels his earlier romance with Vesper Lynd in Casino Royale: "In both films, Bond seemingly finds himself in a relatively happy relationship, before it all comes crashing down as a result of apparent betrayal." John L. Flynn and Bob Blackwood suggest that Bond's relationship with Swann is a very modern one: "Daniel Craig's interpretation of a more modern 007 may well help dissipate Bond's outmoded, chauvinistic approach to love and relationships, and establish more complicated and thus more realistic relationships with his leading ladies in the new millennium."

Mary Rose Somarriba describes Madeleine as a "near match, if not equal, to Bond in combat, assassination know-how, and intellect." Somarriba goes on to say,

Far from a one-dimensional character, Swann is remarkably multifaceted in her strength and smarts. Perhaps most striking is not her being equal to her male counterpart but instead what makes her different. There's one way in which Swann is superior to Bond, and that is in how she sees beyond the assassin's life—she sees it as ultimately lacking and wants more. Swann is highly educated as a doctor in psychology, and despite being trained in combat by her father, she prefers to live far away from things that would tempt her back to that life, hence her station in the Austrian Alps at a private medical clinic.
