= Production of the James Bond films =

The James Bond film series is a British series of spy films based on the fictional character of MI6 agent James Bond, "007", who originally appeared in a series of books by Ian Fleming. It is one of the longest continually running film series in history, having been in ongoing production from 1962 to the present (with a six-year hiatus between 1989 and 1995). In that time, Eon Productions has produced 25 films as of 2021, most of them at Pinewood Studios. With a combined gross of over $7 billion, the films produced by Eon constitute the fifth-highest-grossing film series. (Note: Adjusted for inflation, the Eon James Bond series up to and including Quantum of Solace had amassed over $12 billion at 2011 prices. Skyfall subsequently added a further $1.100 billion in 2012 to take the adjusted total to over $13 billion. Estimates by The New York Times put the adjusted gross at $17.735 billion prior to the release of Spectre, which added $0.880 billion in 2015, taking the adjusted total over $18.8 billion.) Six actors have portrayed 007 in the Eon series, the latest being Daniel Craig.

Albert R. Broccoli and Harry Saltzman co-produced most of the Eon films until 1975, when Broccoli became the sole producer. The single exception during this period was Thunderball, on which Broccoli and Saltzman became executive producers while Kevin McClory produced. From 1984 Broccoli was joined by his stepson Michael G. Wilson as producer and in 1995 Broccoli stepped aside from Eon and was replaced by his daughter Barbara, who has co-produced with Wilson since. Broccoli's (and until 1975, Saltzman's) family company, Danjaq, has held ownership of the series through Eon, and maintained co-ownership with United Artists (UA) since the mid-1970s. The Eon series has seen continuity both in the main actors and in the production crews, with directors, writers, composers, production designers, and others employed through a number of films.

From the release of Dr. No (1962) to For Your Eyes Only (1981), the films were distributed solely by UA. When Metro-Goldwyn-Mayer (MGM) absorbed UA in 1981, MGM/UA Entertainment Co. was formed and distributed the films until 1995. MGM solely distributed three films from 1997 to 2002 after UA was retired as a mainstream studio. From 2006 to 2015, MGM and Columbia Pictures co-distributed the film series, following the 2004 acquisition of MGM by a consortium led by Columbia's parent company, Sony Pictures. In November 2010, MGM filed for bankruptcy. Following its emergence from insolvency, Columbia became co-production partner of the series with Eon. Sony's distribution rights to the franchise expired in late 2015 with the release of Spectre. In 2017, MGM and Eon offered a one-film contract to co-finance and distribute the 25th film worldwide, which was reported in May 2018 to have been won by Universal Pictures. The 25th film, No Time to Die, was the first and only in the franchise to be distributed by United Artists Releasing (UAR), a joint venture of MGM and Annapurna Pictures, prior to its folding in 2023.

Independently of the Eon series, there have been three additional productions featuring Bond: an American television adaptation, Casino Royale (1954), produced by CBS; a spoof, also titled Casino Royale (1967), produced by Charles K. Feldman; and a remake of Thunderball titled Never Say Never Again (1983), produced by Jack Schwartzman, who had obtained the rights from McClory.

== First screen adaptation ==
In 1954 the American CBS television network paid Ian Fleming $1,000 ($11,989 in 2025 dollars) for the rights to turn his first novel, Casino Royale, into a one-hour television adventure as part of the dramatic anthology series Climax Mystery Theater, which ran between October 1954 and June 1958. It was adapted for the screen by Anthony Ellis and Charles Bennett; Bennett was well known for his collaborations with Alfred Hitchcock, including The 39 Steps and Sabotage. Due to the restriction of a one-hour play, the adapted version lost many of the details found in the book, although it retained its violence, particularly in Act III. The hour-long "Casino Royale" episode, which starred American actor Barry Nelson as Bond and Peter Lorre as the villain Le Chiffre, aired on 21 October 1954 as a live production.

== Eon Productions ==
Timeline of the James Bond films

Release timeline
1962	Dr. No
1963	From Russia with Love
1964	Goldfinger
1965	Thunderball
1966
1967	Casino Royale
1967	You Only Live Twice
1968
1969	On Her Majesty's Secret Service
1970
1971	Diamonds Are Forever
1972
1973	Live and Let Die
1974	The Man with the Golden Gun
1975
1976
1977	The Spy Who Loved Me
1978
1979	Moonraker
1980
1981	For Your Eyes Only
1982
1983	Octopussy
1983	Never Say Never Again
1984
1985	A View to a Kill
1986
1987	The Living Daylights
1988
1989	Licence to Kill
1990
1991
1992
1993
1994
1995	GoldenEye
1996
1997	Tomorrow Never Dies
1998
1999	The World Is Not Enough
2000
2001
2002	Die Another Day
2003
2004
2005
2006	Casino Royale
2007
2008	Quantum of Solace
2009
2010
2011
2012	Skyfall
2013
2014
2015	Spectre
2016
2017
2018
2019
2020
2021	No Time to Die
2022
2023
2024
2025
2026
2027
2028	Bond 26

=== Albert R. Broccoli and Harry Saltzman (1962–1964) ===
In 1959 producer Albert R. "Cubby" Broccoli at Warwick Films expressed interest in adapting the Bond novels, but his colleague Irving Allen was unenthusiastic. In June 1961 Fleming sold a six-month option on the film rights to his published and future James Bond novels and short stories to Harry Saltzman, with the exception of Casino Royale, which he had previously sold. Towards the end of Saltzman's option period, screenwriter Wolf Mankowitz introduced him to Broccoli, and Saltzman and Broccoli formed Eon Productions with the intention of making the first Bond film. A number of Hollywood studios did not want to fund the films, finding them "too British" or "too blatantly sexual". Eventually the two signed a deal with United Artists for 100% financial backing and distribution of seven films, with financing of $1 million for the first feature. Saltzman and Broccoli also created the company Danjaq, which was to hold the rights to the films which Eon Productions was to produce.

Eon had originally intended to film Fleming's novel Thunderball first, but Kevin McClory took Fleming to the High Court in London for breach of copyright over the book, and so Eon decided to film Dr. No first.

From the outset, the order in which Eon produced its Bond films differed considerably from the publication sequence of Fleming's Bond novels, and therefore also from the fictional chronology of Bond's life and work which the novels establish.

==== Dr. No (1962) ====
Eon asked several directors—Bryan Forbes, Guy Green, Val Guest and Guy Hamilton—to helm the film, but all declined, before Terence Young agreed. Eon had originally hired Wolf Mankowitz and Richard Maibaum to write Dr. No's screenplay, partly because of Mankowitz's help in brokering the deal between Broccoli and Saltzman. An initial draft of the screenplay was rejected because the scriptwriters had made the villain, Dr. No, a monkey, and Mankowitz left the film. Maibaum then undertook a second version, more closely in line with the novel; Johanna Harwood and Berkely Mather then worked on Maibaum's script, with Harwood in particular being described as a script doctor credited with improving the British characterisations.

To play the lead role of Bond, Sean Connery was not Broccoli or Fleming's first choice, but he was selected after Patrick McGoohan had turned down the role, and Eon had rejected Richard Johnson. After Connery was chosen, Terence Young took the actor to his tailor and hairdresser and introduced him to the high life, restaurants, casinos and women of London. In the words of Bond writer Raymond Benson, Young educated the actor "in the ways of being dapper, witty, and above all, cool".

Filming took place on location in Jamaica between 16 January and 21 February 1962; five days later filming began at Pinewood Studios in England with sets designed by Ken Adam, who had previously worked with Broccoli on the 1960 film The Trials of Oscar Wilde. Maurice Binder created the title sequence and introduced the gun barrel motif that appears in all the Eon Bond films. Monty Norman wrote the accompanying soundtrack, which included the "James Bond Theme", heard in the gun barrel sequence and in a calypso medley over the title credits; the theme was described by another Bond film composer, David Arnold, as "bebop-swing vibe coupled with that vicious, dark, distorted electric guitar, definitely an instrument of rock 'n' roll ... it represented everything about the character you would want: It was cocky, swaggering, confident, dark, dangerous, suggestive, sexy, unstoppable. And he did it in two minutes". The theme was arranged by John Barry, who was uncredited for the arrangement but credited for his performance.

==== From Russia with Love (1963) ====
After the financial success of Dr. No, United Artists doubled the budget offered to Eon Productions to $2 million for the company's next film, From Russia with Love. The film was shot in Europe, which had turned out to be the more profitable market for Dr. No. Most of the crew from the first film returned, with major exceptions being production designer Ken Adam—who went to work on Dr. Strangelove and was replaced by Dr. No's art director Syd Cain—and title designer Maurice Binder, who was replaced by Robert Brownjohn.

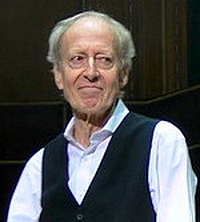
John Barry composed the scores of 11 Bond films between 1963 and 1987.

The original screenwriter for the film was Len Deighton, but he was replaced because of his slow progress. Two of the writers from Dr. No, Richard Maibaum and Johanna Harwood, were brought in, with Maibaum being given the sole writing credit and Harwood being credited for "adaptation". From Russia with Love is the first Bond film in the series with John Barry as the primary soundtrack composer, although Lionel Bart wrote the title song "From Russia with Love", sung by Matt Monro. Principal photography began on 1 April 1963 and concluded on 23 August. Filming took place in Turkey, Pinewood Studios and Venice, with Scotland and Switzerland doubling for the Orient Express journey through Eastern Europe.

==== Goldfinger (1964) ====
While the previous two films had concentrated on the Caribbean and Europe, Goldfinger was chosen by Eon for the third film, with the American cinema market in mind. Because Terence Young was refused a share of the profits, he declined to direct Goldfinger and worked on The Amorous Adventures of Moll Flanders instead, although he had done some pre-production work before he left. In his place, Eon turned to Guy Hamilton to direct; he was keen to inject elements of humour into the series, have more gadgets and build bigger and more elegant sets.

Eon again turned to Richard Maibaum for the script, although Paul Dehn was later introduced for rewrites. After missing From Russia with Love, Ken Adam returned as production designer. Adam's imagination provided the idea of gold stacked upon gold behind iron bars for the scenes in the United States Bullion Depository. Saltzman disliked the design's resemblance to a prison, but Hamilton liked it enough that it was built.

Robert Brownjohn returned to develop the opening credit sequence, which featured clips of all three Bond films projected on actress Margaret Nolan's body. Its design was inspired by seeing light projecting on people's bodies as they got up and left a cinema. Principal photography on Goldfinger started on 20 January 1964 in Miami, at the Fontainebleau Hotel; the crew was small, consisting only of Hamilton, Broccoli, Adam and cinematographer Ted Moore. After five days in Florida, production moved to England. The primary location was Pinewood Studios, home to sets including a recreation of the Fontainebleau, the South American city of the pre-title sequence, and both Goldfinger's estate and factory. Ian Fleming visited the set of Goldfinger in April 1964; he died in August, shortly before the film's release. The second unit filmed in Kentucky, and these shots were edited into scenes filmed at Pinewood. Principal photography then moved to Switzerland for the car chase and additional footage for Goldfinger's factory sequence. Filming wrapped on 11 July at Andermatt, after nineteen weeks of shooting.

=== Kevin McClory (1965) ===
When writing his novels, Ian Fleming had always considered that they could be adapted for the cinema, and he approached producer Sir Alexander Korda to make a film adaptation of either Live and Let Die or Moonraker. Although Korda was initially interested, he later withdrew. On 1 October 1959, it was announced that Fleming would write an original film script featuring Bond for producer Kevin McClory. Jack Whittingham also worked on the script, culminating in a screenplay entitled James Bond, Secret Agent. However, Alfred Hitchcock and Richard Burton turned down roles as director and star, respectively. McClory was unable to secure the financing for the film, and the deal fell through. Fleming subsequently used the story for his novel Thunderball (1961), and McClory failed to have its publication stopped. On 19 November 1963 he took the matter to the Chancery Division of the High Court in the case of McClory v Fleming, but settled on 9 December 1963, after nine days in court. McClory gained the literary and film rights for the screenplay, while Fleming was given the rights to the novel, although it had to be recognised as being "based on a screen treatment by Kevin McClory, Jack Whittingham and the Author".

==== Thunderball (1965) ====
After From Russia with Love, Eon had considered undertaking an adaptation of either On Her Majesty's Secret Service or Casino Royale. They entered into negotiations with Charles K. Feldman, who held the rights to the latter, but a deal proved too difficult to achieve. Instead, Eon turned to the Thunderball novel. Although Eon had wanted to adapt the book in 1962, it had not been possible until the legal obstacles had been cleared. As a result of the settlement of the copyright infringement lawsuit brought by Kevin McClory, Eon negotiated with McClory to make Thunderball. McClory received the sole producer credit on the film, while Broccoli and Saltzman took the title Executive Producer, although "in reality all three men would essentially act as producers". Broccoli later said of the three-way partnership that "We didn't want anyone else to make Thunderball ... We had the feeling that if anyone else came in and made their own Bond film, it would have been bad for our series".

Guy Hamilton was asked to direct again, but declined feeling that he was "drained of ideas ... I had nothing to contribute until I'd recharged batteries"; Terence Young returned to direct after the hiatus of Goldfinger. Richard Maibaum's original script from 1961 was used as the basis of the script, which he then re-drafted, with further revisions by John Hopkins. Principal filming began in Paris on 16 February 1965, and moved to Nassau on 22 March, before concluding at Pinewood Studios in May.

With worldwide box office earnings of $141.2 million Thunderball became the highest-grossing instalment and retained the record until it was surpassed by The Spy Who Loved Me twelve years later; adjusted for inflation it remained the most successful entry until Skyfall was released in 2012. As part of the contract with Eon, McClory received 20% of the film's profits and undertook not to produce any other films based on the Thunderball story for a period of ten years following the release of the Eon-produced version in 1965.

=== Albert R. Broccoli and Harry Saltzman (1967–1975) ===
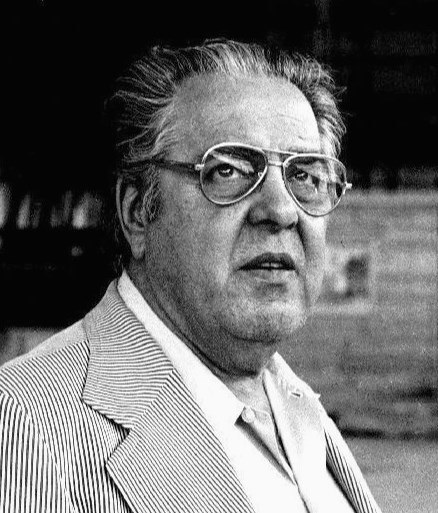
Bond film producer Albert R. Broccoli

==== You Only Live Twice (1967) ====
After the interruption of McClory as producer, Albert Broccoli and Harry Saltzman returned to production once again. The first four Bond films had been popular in Japan, and Eon decided to take advantage of the market by producing You Only Live Twice. The film included progressive elements of Japanese culture as part of the background.

Lewis Gilbert was appointed director and Ken Adam returned as production designer. Adam built a volcano hideaway set for the main antagonist, Ernst Stavro Blofeld, at Pinewood for $1 million ($9.7 million in 2025 dollars); at the time it was the biggest film set in Europe. Gilbert, Broccoli, Saltzman, Ken Adam and director of photography Freddie Young then went to Japan, spending three weeks searching for locations. While in Tokyo, the crew crossed paths with Peter R. Hunt, who was on holiday. Hunt had edited the first four Bond films, and he was invited to direct the second unit. The total budget for the film was $10.3 million ($99.5 million in 2025 dollars).

Initially the screenwriter was to be Harold Jack Bloom, although he was later replaced by Roald Dahl, who had little previous screenwriting experience. You Only Live Twice was the first Bond film to jettison the plot premise of the Fleming source material, although the film retains the title, the Japanese setting, the use of Blofeld as the main villain and a Bond girl named Kissy Suzuki from the novel.

Filming commenced at Pinewood on 4 July 1966 before moving out to Japan on 27 July for six weeks' filming. Local Japanese interest in the filming was high, and the crew had to contend with large crowds throughout the process. Connery, however, was somewhat resigned to the project, lacking the enthusiasm he sported for Thunderball. A press conference on his arrival had been tense, "soured by aggressive questioning of Connery's crumpled, jet-lagged appearance". Primary and secondary photography finished in December; the special effects filming for the space scenes were undertaken between January and March 1967, prior to the film's release on 12 June.

The cinema posters for the film stated "Sean Connery IS James Bond", to distance the Eon-produced picture from the independent Casino Royale, which had been released two months earlier. However, during the production, Connery announced that it would be his last film as Bond, leaving Broccoli to tell Alan Whicker, "it won't be the last Bond under any circumstances—with all due respect to Sean, who I think has been certainly the best man to play this part. We will, in our own way, try to continue the Bond series for the audience because it's too important".

==== On Her Majesty's Secret Service (1969) ====
George Lazenby was signed on to play Bond for On Her Majesty's Secret Service. Between Sean Connery giving his notice at the beginning of filming You Only Live Twice and the release, Saltzman had planned to adapt The Man with the Golden Gun in Cambodia and use Roger Moore as the next Bond, but political instability meant the location was ruled out and Moore signed up for another series of The Saint. After You Only Live Twice was released in 1967, the producers once again picked the often delayed On Her Majesty's Secret Service, which had previously been considered to follow both Goldfinger and then Thunderball.

Peter Hunt, who had worked on the five preceding films, had impressed Broccoli and Saltzman enough to earn his directorial debut as they believed his quick cutting had set the style for the series; it was also the result of a long-standing promise from Broccoli and Saltzman for the opportunity to direct. Hunt also asked for the position during the production of Chitty Chitty Bang Bang, and he brought along with him many crew members, including cinematographer Michael Reed. Hunt was focused on putting his mark, saying, "I wanted it to be different than any other Bond film would be. It was my film, not anyone else's". On Her Majesty's Secret Service was the last film on which Hunt worked in the series.

Screenwriter Richard Maibaum, who worked on the first four Bond films, returned as script writer. Saltzman and Broccoli decided to drop the science fiction gadgets from the earlier films and focus more on plot as in From Russia With Love. Peter Hunt asked Simon Raven to write some of the dialogue between Contessa Teresa "Tracy" di Vicenzo and Blofeld in Piz Gloria, which was to be "sharper, better and more intellectual"; Raven's additions included rewriting the proposal scene and having Tracy quote James Elroy Flecker. Syd Cain took over from Ken Adam as production designer as Eon decided not to have Adam's larger sets to reduce the film's budget to $7 million, from the $10.3 million it took to make You Only Live Twice.

Principal photography began in the Canton of Bern, Switzerland, on 21 October 1968, with the first scene shot being an aerial view of Bond climbing the stairs of Blofeld's mountain retreat. The scenes were shot atop the now-famous revolving restaurant Piz Gloria, located atop the Schilthorn near the village of Mürren. The location was found by production manager Hubert Fröhlich after three weeks of location scouting in France and Switzerland. The Swiss filming ended up running 56 days over schedule. In March 1969 production moved to England, with London's Pinewood Studios being used for interior shooting, and M's house being shot in Marlow, Buckinghamshire. In April the filmmakers went to Portugal, where principal photography wrapped in May. Filming finished on 23 June, two months later than planned, which was largely due to the warm Swiss winter, which had hampered shooting.

Midway through production, acting on advice from his agent Ronan O'Rahilly, George Lazenby announced that he was not going to continue as Bond in future films, and he left the role before the December 1969 release of On Her Majesty's Secret Service.

==== Diamonds Are Forever (1971) ====
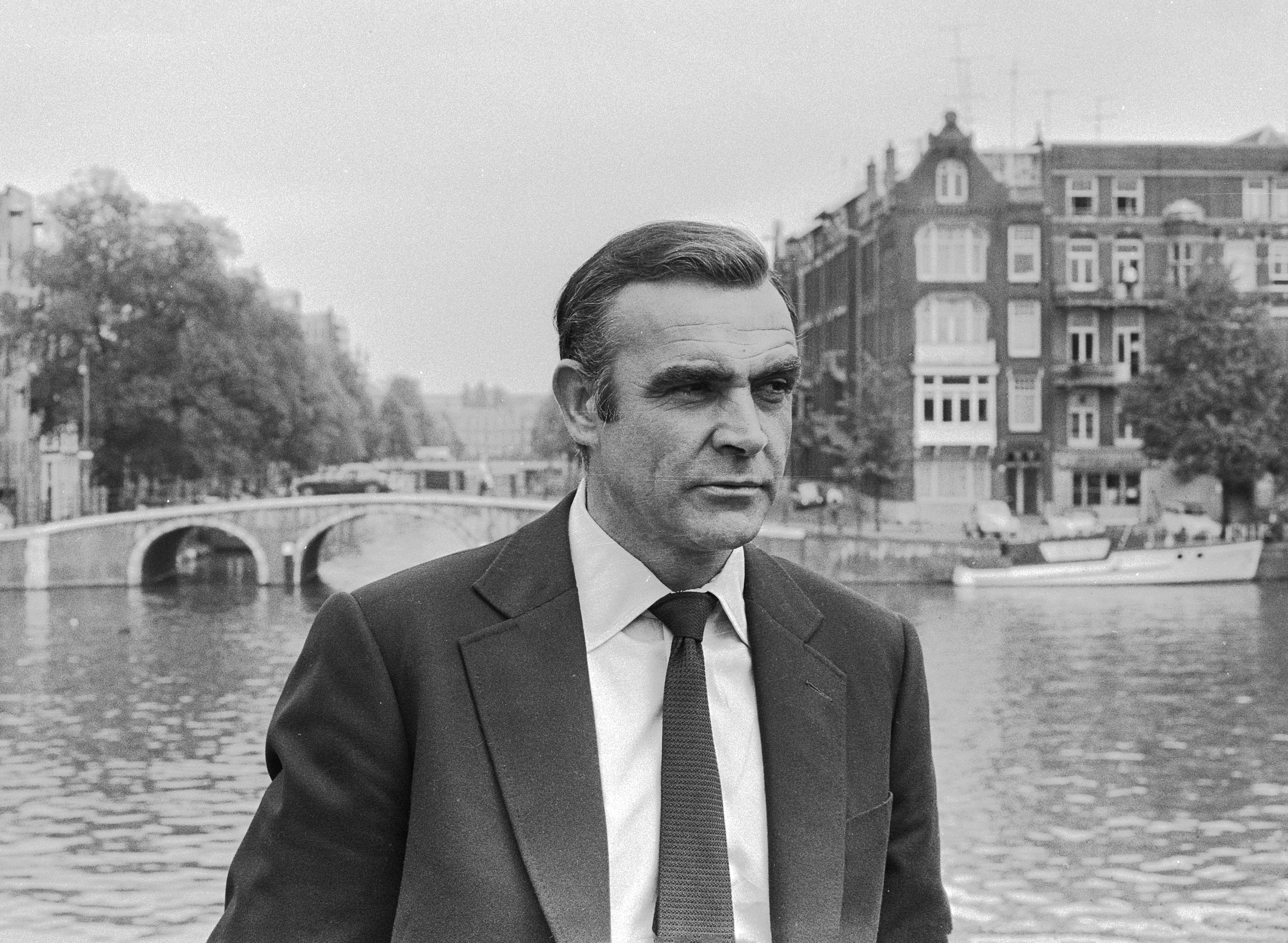
Sean Connery in Amsterdam in July 1971, filming for the seventh Bond film Diamonds are Forever

Although Eon secured the services of John Gavin to play the role of Bond, United Artists' chief David Picker was unhappy with this decision and instructed associate producer Stanley Sopel to broker a deal with Connery which saw the actor being paid $1.25 million ($13 million in 2025 dollars) and 12.5% of the gross. Connery's salary took a significant part of the $7.2 million budget.

The producers had originally intended to have Diamonds Are Forever re-create commercially successful aspects of Goldfinger, so they hired director Guy Hamilton as a result. Richard Maibaum also returned to write the script; the first draft envisaged the return of Auric Goldfinger portrayer Gert Fröbe, this time in the role of Goldfinger's twin brother. Maibaum also wrote a climax to the film that consisted of the new Goldfinger being chased across Lake Mead by the people of Las Vegas, all being co-ordinated by Bond. In the autumn of 1970 Tom Mankiewicz was hired to undertake re-writes, which included removing Goldfinger's brother and the Lake Mead finale.

Filming began on 5 April 1971 with the desert near Las Vegas doubling for the South African scenes, followed by filming in the Great Basin Desert, Nevada in May for scenes in which Bond drives a moon buggy. On 7 June production moved to Pinewood Studios for filming at sets of the returning Ken Adam; his sets spread through four of Pinewood's stages. Filming also took place in London, Dover, Southampton, Amsterdam and Southern France; principal photography finished 13 August 1971.

==== Live and Let Die (1973) ====
While filming Diamonds Are Forever, Live and Let Die was chosen as the next Ian Fleming novel to be adapted because screenwriter Tom Mankiewicz thought it would be daring to use black villains, as the Black Panthers and other racial movements were active at that time. The new Bond actor selected by Eon was Roger Moore, and he tried not to imitate either his predecessor Sean Connery or his own performance as Simon Templar in The Saint; Mankiewicz adapted the screenplay to emphasise Moore's persona by giving him more comedy scenes and creating a light-hearted feel to Bond. Guy Hamilton was again chosen to direct, and Mankiewicz suggested they film in New Orleans, as he knew Hamilton was a jazz fan. Hamilton didn't want to use Mardi Gras, as Thunderball featured Junkanoo, a similar festival, so after more discussions with the writer and further scouting, he decided to use two well-known features of the city, the jazz funerals and the canals. While searching for locations in Jamaica, the crew discovered a crocodile farm owned by Ross Kananga, after passing a sign warning that "trespassers will be eaten". The farm was put into the script and also inspired Mankiewicz to name the film's villain after Kananga. With the rise of the popularity of blaxploitation films in the early 1970s, it was decided to borrow elements of the genre for Live and Let Die.

Syd Cain returned as art director and was involved searching for locations with Guy Hamilton in March 1972. Principal photography began on 13 October 1972 in the Irish Bayou in Louisiana for a boat chase scene. On 29 November production moved to Jamaica, which doubled for the fictional island San Monique, the home of antagonist Kananga. In December, production was divided between interiors in Pinewood Studios, while a separate unit also shot in Harlem.

John Barry, who had worked on the previous five films, was unavailable during production. Broccoli and Saltzman instead asked Paul McCartney to write the theme song. Since McCartney's salary of $15,000 (plus royalties) was high and another composer of Barry's stature could not be hired with the remainder of the music budget, George Martin, who had little experience of film scoring, was hired.

==== The Man with the Golden Gun (1974) ====
The Man with the Golden Gun saw a change in location from the novel of the same name to put Bond in the Far East for the second time. After considering Beirut, where part of the film is set; Iran, where the location scouting was done but eventually discarded because of the Yom Kippur War; and the Hạ Long Bay in Vietnam, the production team chose Thailand as a primary location, following a suggestion of production designer Peter Murton after he saw pictures of the Phuket bay in a magazine. Saltzman was happy with the choice of the Far East for the setting as he had always wanted to go on location in Thailand and Hong Kong. During the reconnaissance of locations in Hong Kong, Broccoli saw the partially submerged wreckage of the former RMS Queen Elizabeth and came up with the idea of using it as the base for MI6's Far East operations.

Tom Mankiewicz wrote a first draft for the script in 1973, delivering a script that was a battle of wills between Bond and the primary villain Francisco Scaramanga, whom he saw as Bond's alter ego, "a super-villain of the stature of Bond himself". Tensions between Mankiewicz and Guy Hamilton led to Richard Maibaum taking over scripting duties. Maibaum, who had worked on six Bond films previously, delivered his own draft based on Mankiewicz's work. Broccoli's stepson Michael G. Wilson researched solar power to create the MacGuffin of the "Solex Agitator". While Live and Let Die had borrowed heavily from the blaxploitation genre, The Man with the Golden Gun borrowed from the martial arts genre that was popular in the 1970s.

On 6 November 1973 filming commenced at the exterior location shots of RMS Queen Elizabeth, which acted as a top-secret MI6 base grounded in Victoria Harbour in Hong Kong. The major part of principal photography started in April 1974 in Thailand. Thai locations included Bangkok, Thonburi, Phuket and the nearby Phang Nga Province, on the islands of Ko Khao Phing Kan (Thai: เกาะเขาพิงกัน) and Ko Tapu (Thai: เกาะตะปู). In late April production returned to Hong Kong and also shot in Macau. Production had to move to studio work in Pinewood Studios—which included sets such as Scaramanga's solar energy plant and island interior.

John Barry returned to compose the score, but had only three weeks to complete the work, and the theme tune and score are generally considered by critics to be among the weakest of Barry's contributions to the series—an opinion shared by Barry himself: "It's the one I hate most ... it just never happened for me".

=== Albert R. Broccoli (1975–1984) ===
Following The Man with the Golden Gun, producer Harry Saltzman sold his 50% stake in Eon Productions' parent company, Danjaq, to United Artists to alleviate his financial problems, brought about by financial constraints following a downturn in the fortunes of Technicolor, in which he had invested heavily. The resulting legalities over the Bond property delayed production of the next Bond film, The Spy Who Loved Me.

==== The Spy Who Loved Me (1977) ====
Guy Hamilton was initially scheduled to follow on from The Man with the Golden Gun with The Spy Who Loved Me, but instead turned down Eon Productions during pre-production after being offered the opportunity to direct the 1978 film Superman, although he was ultimately passed up for Richard Donner. Eon then turned to Lewis Gilbert, who had directed the earlier Bond film You Only Live Twice. Broccoli commissioned a number of writers to work on the script, including Stirling Silliphant, John Landis, Ronald Hardy, Anthony Burgess and Derek Marlowe, but Richard Maibaum drew up the first draft script, with some inclusions from the previous writers. When Lewis Gilbert was hired to direct, he brought with him Christopher Wood to revise Maibaum's draft. The draft Wood prepared was challenged in court by Kevin McClory, who alleged infringement based on the use of what he claimed were his rights in SPECTRE and the Blofeld character. Eon disputed McClory's claim but had Wood remove the organisation and character from the script.

Ken Adam returned as production designer. As no studio stages were big enough for the interior of the villain Karl Stromberg's supertanker, in March 1976 construction began of a new sound stage at Pinewood, the 007 Stage, which cost $1.8 million and became the largest stage in the world. In contrast to the volcano crater set Adam had built for You Only Live Twice in 1966—which Adam had called "a workable but ultimately wasteful set"—the 007 Stage would be a permanent structure that could be rented out to other productions. Secondary filming began in July 1976 at Baffin Island, where the ski jump for the opening credits was filmed. Principal filming commenced in Sardinia in August 1976, moving on to Egypt shortly afterwards. Further filming took place in Sardinia, Malta, Japan, Switzerland and the Faslane submarine base. On 5 December 1976, with principal photography finished, the 007 Stage was formally opened by the former Prime Minister Harold Wilson.

John Barry could not work in the United Kingdom due to tax problems (Note: The Inland Revenue had frozen all Barry's royalties in 1977 in a dispute over unpaid tax, leading to him not being able to undertake work for the British-registered Eon Productions.) and suggested Marvin Hamlisch to score the film. Hamlisch composed "Nobody Does It Better" as the theme song; the score and the song were both nominated for Academy and Golden Globe Awards.

==== Moonraker (1979) ====
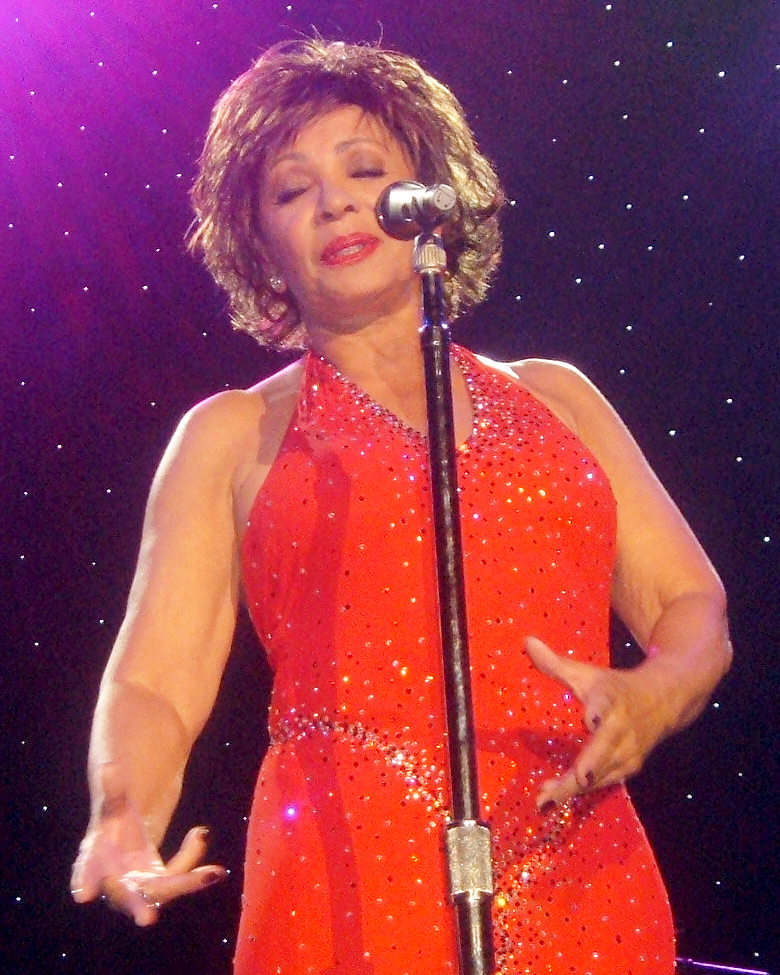
Shirley Bassey performed the theme song for three Bond films: Goldfinger (1964), Diamonds Are Forever (1971) and Moonraker (1979)

Eon Productions had originally planned to follow The Spy Who Loved Me with an adaptation of For Your Eyes Only, although this plan changed within weeks of the 1977 release, following the box office success of the 1977 space-themed film Star Wars. With a budget of $34 million Moonraker cost more than double any of the previous Bond films, although both Broccoli and United Artists agreed to the costs because of the profits from The Spy Who Loved Me.

Lewis Gilbert was again appointed as director, and a number of the crew from The Spy Who Loved Me also joined the production. Gilbert and Tom Mankiewicz wrote the initial story, but Christopher Wood turned this into the final screenplay. Many of the script ideas came about as a result of location scouting, with Iguazu Falls being identified as a filming location while Broccoli was in Brazil for the release of The Spy Who Loved Me.

Unlike previous Bond films, the production of Moonraker was not based at Pinewood, as Broccoli moved it to Paris for financial reasons, although the scenes for the cable car interiors and space battle exteriors were filmed at Pinewood, with the special effects team of Derek Meddings active in the UK throughout production. Principal photography began on 11 August 1978 in Paris. The sets designed by returning production designer Ken Adam were the largest ever constructed in France and required more than 222,000 man-hours to construct (approximately 1,000 hours by each of the crew on average). Much of the film was shot in the cities of London, Paris, Venice, Palmdale, California, Port St. Lucie, Florida and Rio de Janeiro. Principal filming finished back in Paris on 27 February 1979, a 28-week schedule that had allowed Roger Moore only three days off. John Barry was again asked to score an Eon film.

==== For Your Eyes Only (1981) ====
For Your Eyes Only marked a change in the production crew: John Glen was promoted from his duties as a film editor to director, a position he would occupy for the next four films. Since Ken Adam was busy with the film Pennies from Heaven, Peter Lamont, who had worked in the art department since Goldfinger, was promoted to production designer. Following a suggestion from Glen, Lamont created realistic sets, instead of the elaborate scenery for which the series had been known.

Richard Maibaum was once again the scriptwriter for the story, assisted by Michael G. Wilson. According to Wilson, the ideas could have come from anyone as a committee that could include Broccoli, Maibaum, Wilson, Glen and stunt coordinators worked on the outlines. Much of the inspiration for the stories for the film came from two Fleming short stories from the collection For Your Eyes Only: "Risico" and "For Your Eyes Only". Another set-piece from the novel of Live and Let Die—the keelhauling—which was unused in that novel's adaptation, was inserted into the plot.

Production of For Your Eyes Only began on 2 September 1980 in the North Sea, with three days shooting exterior scenes for the scenes involving the St Georges spyboat. The interiors were shot later in Pinewood Studios, as well as the ship's explosion, which was done with a miniature in Pinewood's tank on the 007 Stage. On 15 September principal photography started in Corfu at the Villa Sylva at Kanoni, above Corfu Town, which acted as the location of the Spanish villa.

In October filming moved to other Greek locations, including Meteora and the Achilleion. In November the main unit moved to England, which included interior work in Pinewood, while the second unit shot underwater scenes in the Bahamas. On 1 January 1981 production moved to Cortina d'Ampezzo in Italy, where filming wrapped in February. Many of the underwater scenes, especially involving close-ups of Bond and Melina, were shot on a dry soundstage. A combination of lighting effects, slow-motion photography, wind, and bubbles added in post-production, gave the illusion of the actors being underwater. The pre-credits sequence used a church in Stoke Poges as a cemetery, while scenes involving a helicopter were filmed at the abandoned Beckton Gas Works in London.

The score of For Your Eyes Only was written by Bill Conti, who retained a number of John Barry-influenced brass elements in the score but also added elements of dance and funk music.

==== Octopussy (1983) ====
In 1980 United Artists, which had provided much of the funding for the Bond films, fell into financial difficulties following the high production costs and subsequent commercial failure of Heaven's Gate, bringing uncertainty to the future of the funding. The situation was resolved in May 1981, when Metro-Goldwyn-Mayer acquired United Artists.

Following For Your Eyes Only, Roger Moore had expressed a desire to stop playing James Bond. His original contract had been for three films, a requirement fulfilled with The Spy Who Loved Me. Subsequent films had been negotiated on a film-by-film basis. The producers engaged in a semi-public quest for the next actor to play Bond, which would be for Octopussy. However, when Kevin McClory announced his re-working of Thunderball as Never Say Never Again, the producers re-contracted Moore in the belief that an established actor in the role would fare better against McClory's choice of Bond, Sean Connery. Before For Your Eyes Only had been released, Albert Broccoli had asked John Glen to return and direct Octopussy. George MacDonald Fraser wrote an initial treatment that was extensively revised by Michael G. Wilson and Richard Maibaum.

First unit filming began on 10 August 1982 at the Berlin Wall crossing point Checkpoint Charlie, although the second unit had already been at work for a few weeks, filming scenes for a mid-air fight sequence. The Monsoon Palace served as the exterior of villain Kamal Khan's palace, while scenes set at the palace of titular character Octopussy were filmed at the Lake Palace and Jag Mandir. Bond's hotel was the Shiv Niwas Palace. In England RAF Northolt, RAF Upper Heyford and RAF Oakley were the main locations. Scenes set at the Karl-Marx-Stadt railways scenes were shot at the Nene Valley Railway, while studio work was undertaken at Pinewood Studios and 007 Stage. Filming finished on 21 January 1983. John Barry returned to score, having passed on For Your Eyes Only for tax reasons. While Barry wrote the title song, "All Time High", Tim Rice wrote the lyrics and the song was performed by Rita Coolidge.

Octopussy had its premiere on 6 June 1983, four months before the October release of Never Say Never Again. From its budget of $27.5 million, Octopussy took $183.7 million at the box office, a figure which saw it surpass the takings of its Connery-led rival, which took $160 million.

=== Albert R. Broccoli and Michael G. Wilson (1984–1989) ===
In 1984 Michael G. Wilson joined Albert R. Broccoli as co-producer at Eon. Wilson had first worked on a Bond production in February 1964 with the filming of Goldfinger. He had worked on every production since The Spy Who Loved Me, and had been executive producer on Moonraker, For Your Eyes Only and Octopussy.

==== A View to a Kill (1985) ====
The day before the UK premiere of the non-Eon rival Bond film, Never Say Never Again, Eon announced that Roger Moore would return as Bond for the seventh time. John Glen also returned as director, while Peter Lamont and John Barry also signed up as they had for Octopussy. Michael G. Wilson co-wrote the screenplay with Richard Maibaum.

On 27 June 1984 the 007 Stage was almost entirely destroyed by fire. It was rebuilt in time for production and reopened in January 1985, when it was renamed the "Albert Broccoli 007 Stage". The second unit started filming in Iceland in July 1984, while principal photography with Moore commenced on 1 August at Pinewood. Also in August, the second unit filmed in Paris, including scenes involving a parachute jump from the Eiffel Tower.

The Amberley Museum & Heritage Centre doubled as the exterior of villain Max Zorin's mine, while the scenes in the complex under Zorin's stables were filmed in a Renault plant in Swindon, before primary filming moved to San Francisco. Filming finished in January 1985 at the 007 Stage, with the filming of the interior of Zorin's mine, designed by Peter Lamont.

==== The Living Daylights (1987) ====
With the retirement of Roger Moore following A View to a Kill, the producers searched for a new Bond and eventually cast Timothy Dalton in the lead role in August 1986. Much of the senior production crew from the previous film worked on The Living Daylights, with John Glen directing, John Barry providing the score and Peter Lamont acting as production designer. Michael G. Wilson and Richard Maibaum again provided the script and initially proposed a prequel, showing Bond's first mission, although this was turned down by Broccoli. Script work continued while the producers searched for Moore's successor.

The film was shot at the 007 Stage at Pinewood Studios, with principal photography starting on 29 September 1986, before moving to Vienna on 5 October, where the crew filmed for two weeks. Meanwhile, the second unit had started work on the pre-credits sequence on Gibraltar on 17 September before moving to Morocco. Filming finished on 13 February 1987.

The Living Daylights was the twelfth and final Bond film to be scored by composer John Barry. The title song of the film, "The Living Daylights", was co-written with Paul Waaktaar-Savoy of the Norwegian pop-music group A-ha and recorded by them. The group and Barry did not collaborate well, resulting in two versions of the theme song.

The production costs of The Living Daylights were $40 million, and the film posted box office results of $191.2 million.

==== Licence to Kill (1989) ====
Shortly after the release of The Living Daylights, producers Albert R. Broccoli and Michael G. Wilson and writer Richard Maibaum started discussing the sequel. They decided that the film would retain a realistic style, as well as showing the "darker edge" of the Bond character. For the primary location, the producers wanted a place where the series had not yet visited. While China was visited after an invitation by the government, the idea fell through partly because the 1987 film The Last Emperor had removed some of the novelty from filming in China. By this stage the writers had already talked about a chase sequence along the Great Wall, as well as a fight scene amongst the Terracotta Army. Wilson also wrote two plot outlines about a drug lord in the Golden Triangle before the plans fell through. The writers eventually decided on a setting in a tropical country while Broccoli negotiated to film in Mexico, at the Estudios Churubusco in Mexico City. In 1985 the Films Act was passed, removing the Eady Levy, which resulted in foreign artists being taxed more heavily. The associated rising costs to Eon Productions meant no part of Licence to Kill was filmed in the UK, the first Bond film not to do so. Pinewood Studios, used in every Bond film that far, housed only the post-production and sound re-recording.

The initial outline of what would become Licence to Kill was drawn up by Wilson and Maibaum. Before the pair could develop the script, the Writers Guild of America (WGA) went on strike and Maibaum was unable to continue writing, leaving Wilson to work on the script on his own. The script—initially called Licence Revoked—was written with Dalton's characterisation of Bond in mind; the obsession with which Bond pursues the drug lord villain Franz Sanchez on behalf of Bond's friend, the CIA and DEA agent Felix Leiter and his dead wife is seen as being because of Bond's own "brutally cut-short marriage".

John Glen returned once again to direct, teaming up once more with production designer Peter Lamont. Principal photography ran from 18 July to 18 November 1988. Shooting began in Mexico, which mostly doubled for the fictional Republic of Isthmus. Other underwater sequences were shot at the Isla Mujeres near Cancún. In August 1988 production moved to the Florida Keys, notably Key West. Seven Mile Bridge towards Pigeon Key was used for the sequence in which the armoured truck transporting Sanchez following his arrest is driven off the edge. Other locations there included the Ernest Hemingway House, Key West International Airport, Mallory Square, St. Mary's Star of the Sea Church for Leiter's wedding and Stephano's House 707 South Street for his house and patio. The US Coast Guard Pier was used to film Isthmus City harbour.

John Barry was not available to score the film because of throat surgery, so the soundtrack's score was composed and conducted by Michael Kamen, who was known for scoring many action films at the time, such as Lethal Weapon and Die Hard. The film's darker and more violent plot elicited calls for cuts by the British Board of Film Classification.

Licence to Kill marked the end of the involvement for a number of long-term crew members, including John Glen, Maurice Binder, Richard Maibaum and cinematographer Alec Mills. It was also the final film which was produced by the partnership of Albert Broccoli and Michael Wilson.

=== Michael G. Wilson and Barbara Broccoli (1990–2025) ===
The relatively disappointing box office returns for Licence to Kill led to Albert Broccoli questioning his own leadership of the series, and he put Danjaq, holders of the Bond film copyright, up for sale. (Note: The asking price for Danjaq remains uncertain, with some sources quoting £200 million and others quoting $200 million.) Timothy Dalton was quoted at the time as saying "My feeling is this will be the last one. I don't mean my last one, I mean the end of the whole lot. I don't speak with any real authority, but it's sort of a feeling I have".

In 1990 the situation was further complicated when MGM/UA was sold to Qintex, which wanted to then merge with Pathé; the Bond back catalogue was leased to Pathé at a lower-than-market value, without consulting Danjaq – which sued MGM/UA Communications, which was itself the target of a failed takeover bid by Pathé. In August 1990 Albert Broccoli appointed his daughter Barbara Broccoli alongside Michael G. Wilson as producers at Eon, while he concentrated on matters at Danjaq. The dispute between Danjaq and MGM/UA was protracted and delayed production of Bond 17, but was finally settled in 1993.

The new producers changed the policy of behind-the-scenes continuity prevalent in the series up to that point and, from the 1990s onwards, there were more changes in key production roles, including employing directors "on a 'guest director' footing".

==== GoldenEye (1995) ====
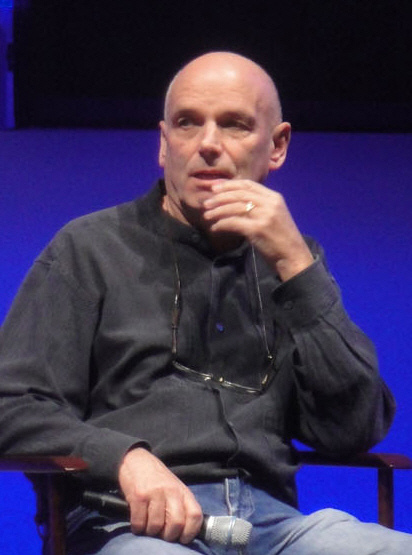
Martin Campbell, who directed GoldenEye and Casino Royale

Despite the legal action, pre-production towards the next Bond film still progressed, with some early details unveiled at the Cannes Film Festival which took place in May 1990. However, delays occurred because of the ongoing legal action with MGM/UA and, in an August 1993 interview, Dalton revealed that Michael France was involved in writing a script for the next Bond film, with Anthony Hopkins as a potential villain, adding that Hopkins had been in discussions with Eon for a number of weeks. Dalton also stated that the earliest production could begin would be in January or February 1994. Dalton's six-year contract expired in 1993, and after reading France's script for what would become GoldenEye, he announced on 12 April 1994 that he would not be returning to play Bond; he was replaced by Pierce Brosnan. After Michael France delivered the original screenplay, Jeffrey Caine was brought in to rework much of the material. Kevin Wade was also brought into the process before Bruce Feirstein gave the final polish to the script.

With Barbara Broccoli and Michael G. Wilson as co-producers, Albert Broccoli oversaw the production of GoldenEye as consulting producer but is credited as "presenter". John Woo was approached to direct the film, but he turned down the opportunity, saying he was honoured by the offer. The producers then chose Martin Campbell to lead the film.

Principal photography started on 16 January 1995 and continued until 6 June. The producers were unable to use Pinewood Studios, the usual location for Bond films, because it had been reserved for First Knight, so an old Rolls-Royce factory at the Leavesden Aerodrome in Hertfordshire was converted into a new studio. In February the crew moved to Monaco for scenes in a casino and a demonstration of a Tiger helicopter. The pre-credits sequence involved a bungee jump, which was filmed at the Contra Dam near Locarno, Switzerland. Reference footage for a scene consisting of a tank chase was shot on location in Saint Petersburg and matched to sets built at the Leavesden studio by production designer Peter Lamont. Scenes on a satellite dish were shot at Arecibo Observatory in Puerto Rico, while in the UK, Epsom Downs Racecourse and the Nene Valley Railway were both used. For the scenes of the fictional Russian location of Severnaya, and other effects, Derek Meddings built a number of miniature sets at Leavesden. Meddings had worked on the Bond films since Live and Let Die and died before the film's release; GoldenEye was dedicated to his memory.

The soundtrack to GoldenEye was composed and performed by Éric Serra. Prolific Bond composer John Barry turned down an offer by Barbara Broccoli to score the film. The theme song, "GoldenEye", was written by Bono and The Edge and was performed by Tina Turner. As Serra did not collaborate with Bono or The Edge, orchestral versions of the song did not appear throughout GoldenEye, as had been the case in previous James Bond films.

==== Tomorrow Never Dies (1997) ====
Before GoldenEye had been released in November 1995, MGM/UA started their preparations for Bond 18, intending for a release in early December 1997, leaving Eon Productions little time for pre-production. The producers were unable to convince Martin Campbell to return; his agent said that "Martin just didn't want to do two Bond films in a row". Instead, Roger Spottiswoode was chosen in September 1996. With Peter Lamont unavailable because he was committed to Titanic, Spottiswoode chose Allan Cameron in his place to provide sets; Spottiswoode and Cameron had previously worked together on Air America.

The story was based on a previously discarded treatment by Donald E. Westlake, which had been written before GoldenEye. The script was given a re-working by Bruce Feirstein, based on the return of Hong Kong to the Chinese. Feirstein's script was then contributed to by Nicholas Meyer before being reworked by Dan Petrie Jr. and David Campbell Wilson before Feirstein, who retained the sole writing credit, was brought in for a final polish. The script was finished a week before principal photography started, although Feirstein had to re-write sequences throughout production. The process was further hampered by poor relations between Feirstein and Spottiswoode.

With the Leavesden studios unavailable, and Pinewood not having sufficient capacity, Eon converted an abandoned grocery warehouse in Hertfordshire into a filming location. With the principal crew about to fly to location in Vietnam, the Vietnamese authorities revoked permission to film at the last minute, and alternative locations were quickly found in Thailand.

Second unit filming began on 18 January 1997 with Vic Armstrong directing; they filmed the pre-credits sequence at Peyresourde Airport in the French Pyrenees, before moving on to Portsmouth to film the scenes where the Royal Navy prepares to engage the Chinese. The main unit began filming on 1 April 1997 at the new studios, before filming at other UK locations; production then moved to Thailand in May. Filming completed three weeks over schedule in September 1997. Eon initially approached John Barry to score the film, but the two sides could not come to terms; the producers then approached David Arnold, whom Barry endorsed.

The delays in the production process and the rush to deliver the film by the MGM/UA-imposed deadline of December 1997 drove the costs upwards to $110 million, although the film recouped $338.9 million at the box office.

==== The World Is Not Enough (1999) ====
Joe Dante and then Peter Jackson were considered as directors for The World Is Not Enough. Barbara Broccoli enjoyed Jackson's Heavenly Creatures, and a screening of The Frighteners was arranged for her. She disliked the latter film, however, and showed no further interest in Jackson. Michael Apted was then selected to lead the film. Writers Neal Purvis and Robert Wade were hired after their work in Plunkett & Macleane, before Michael Apted and his wife, screenwriter Dana Stevens, undertook an uncredited rewrite. Pierce Brosnan was unhappy with some of Stevens' changes to his character, so Michael G. Wilson—who was also uncredited as screenwriter—and Bruce Feirstein undertook further revisions.

Production was centred at Pinewood Studios and principal photography began there on 11 January 1999 with scenes from inside the MI6 offices, designed by Peter Lamont. The pre-title sequence was shot in Bilbao, Spain, in February, with production moving to Chamonix, France, which doubled for the Caucasus scenes. The exterior of a Kazakh nuclear facility was shot at the Bardenas Reales, in Navarre, Spain, while the exterior of an oil refinery control centre was doubled by the Motorola building in Groundwell, Swindon. The exterior of the oil pipeline was filmed in Cwm Dyli, Snowdonia, Wales, while the production teams shot the oil pipeline explosion in Hankley Common, Elstead, Surrey. The production also visited Istanbul, Turkey; the scenes of villain Elektra King's Baku villa were filmed in the city, and the famous Maiden's Tower was used for the hideout of the second villain Renard. The underwater submarine scenes were filmed in the Bahamas.

David Arnold returned to score the music for The World Is Not Enough—the second Bond soundtrack he composed; Garbage sang the title song. For his work on the film, Arnold won an Ivor Novello Award.

==== Die Another Day (2002) ====
Lee Tamahori was hired to direct Die Another Day; Barbara Broccoli admired his film Once Were Warriors, calling it "a phenomenal piece of filmmaking". Broccoli noted that she and Wilson "sensed his genuine enthusiasm for Bond. It was simply great chemistry. Lee was the right guy and we were very, very lucky to get him". Screenwriters Neal Purvis and Robert Wade returned and began work in the summer of 2000 with the producers. They used a premise from Fleming's novel Moonraker as a basis, that of an industrialist villain who had two identities. With the planned release of the film being in the 40th anniversary year of the Bond film series, Tamahori named the Hong Kong hotel seen in the film the "Rubyeon Royale", for Eon's ruby anniversary, as well as Fleming's first novel, Casino Royale.

Second unit filming started on Christmas Day 2001 with Laird Hamilton, Dave Kalama and Darrick Doerner performing the surfing scene at the surf break known as Jaws in Peʻahi, Maui; the shore shots were later taken near Cádiz, Spain and Newquay, Cornwall. Principal photography of Die Another Day began on 11 January 2002 at Pinewood studios. The film was shot primarily in the United Kingdom, Iceland, and Cádiz. Filming in the UK took place at the Eden Project, the Reform Club and Pinewood Studios' 007 Stage, with the sets by production designer Peter Lamont, which included the ice palace. During June seven separate units were filming, including underwater, aerial and miniature; principal photography finished on 9 July, in time for the premiere in London on 20 November 2002.

The soundtrack was composed by David Arnold, while the title song "Die Another Day" was written and performed by Madonna, who also had a cameo appearance in the film as a fencing instructor. Die Another Day had a budget of $142 million and earned $431.9 million at the box office.

==== Casino Royale (2006) ====
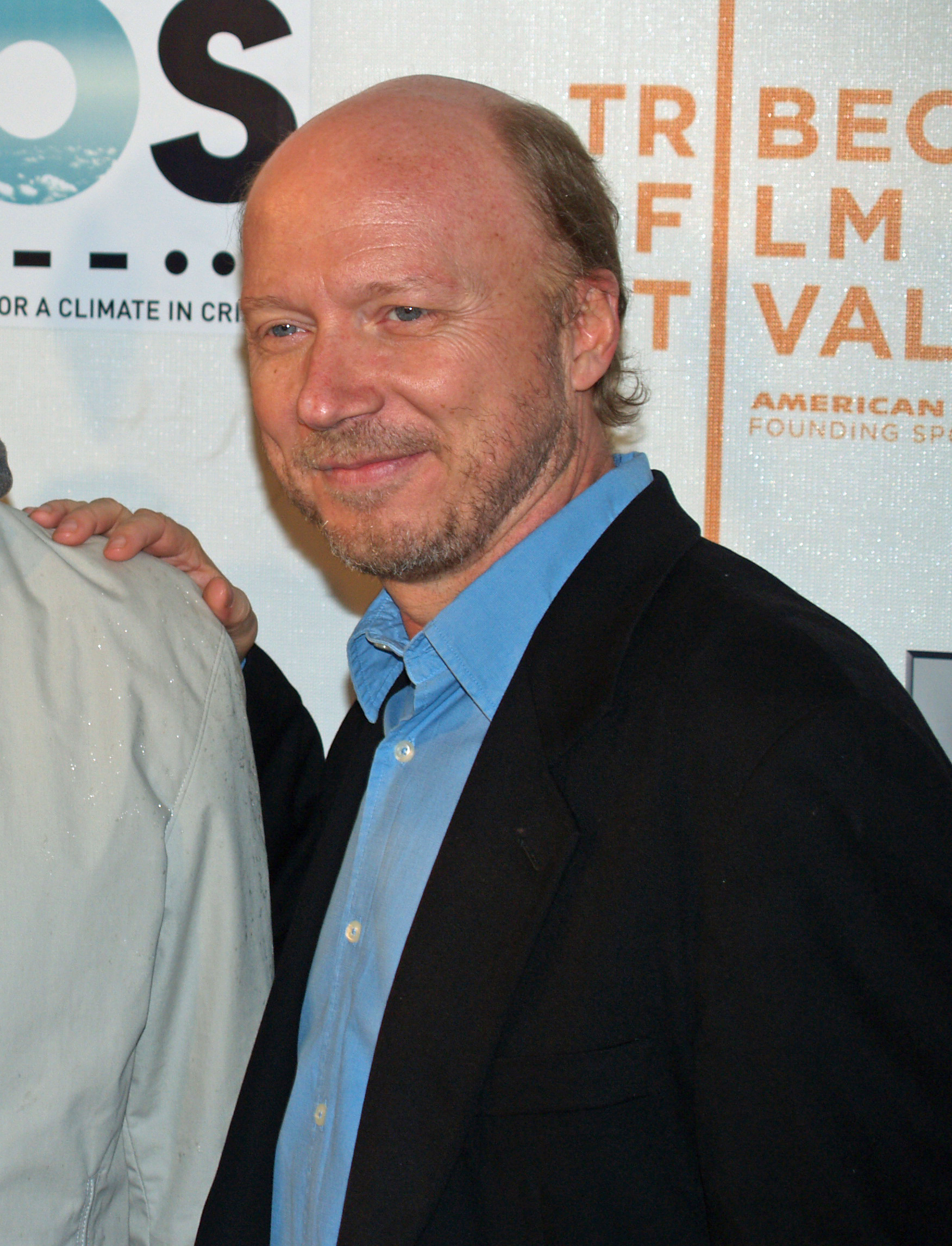
Paul Haggis, who co-wrote the scripts for Casino Royale and Quantum of Solace

In 1999 Metro-Goldwyn-Mayer obtained the rights to the 1967 film Casino Royale from Sony Pictures Entertainment for $10 million in the out-of-court settlement of a lawsuit. The case was brought by MGM after Sony had announced a deal with Kevin McClory to produce a third version of the Thunderball novel, for which McClory held the film rights. McClory had previously acted as producer with Eon on Thunderball and had licensed his rights for the production of Never Say Never Again in 1983. In 2004, following severe financial troubles, MGM was itself acquired by a consortium backed by Sony for $5 billion.

Casino Royale reboots the series, establishing a new timeline and narrative framework not meant to precede or succeed any previous Bond film. Barbara Broccoli stated that "For years, my father wanted to make Casino Royale—it's the Holy Grail ... We wanted to make a tougher film, the way it should have been made years ago". Fellow producer Michael G. Wilson agreed, commenting "We felt the last film was too fantastical, so we decided to go back to the basics and update". Neal Purvis and Robert Wade began writing a screenplay at the end of February 2004, while Pierce Brosnan was still Bond. Paul Haggis was brought in later, and his main contribution included rewriting the climax of the film. He explained that "the draft that was there was very faithful to the book and there was a confession, so in the original draft the character confessed and killed herself. She then sent Bond to chase after the villains; Bond chased the villains into the house. I don't know why but I thought that Vesper [Lynd] had to be in the sinking house and Bond has to want to kill her and then try and save her". In February 2005 Martin Campbell was announced as the film's director and the next Bond film was revealed to be Casino Royale, although the identity of the new Bond was still unknown; the producers had chosen not to renew Pierce Brosnan's contract, and in October Eon announced that the part of Bond would be taken by Daniel Craig.

Principal photography for Casino Royale commenced on 3 January 2006. The film was primarily shot at Barrandov Studios in Prague, with additional location shooting in the Bahamas, Italy and the United Kingdom. The shoot concluded at Pinewood Studios on 20 July 2006. In the Bahamas filming took place at Paradise Island and Albany House, an estate owned by golfers Ernie Els and Tiger Woods. Footage set in Mbale, Uganda, was filmed at Black Park, a Country Park in Buckinghamshire, with further UK location shooting taking place at the Dunsfold Aerodrome in Surrey and the Millbrook Vehicle Proving Ground in Bedfordshire.

For many of the effects in the film, Special Effects and Miniature Effects Supervisor Chris Corbould used a more realistic style of film making and significantly reduced digital effects compared with previous Bond films. Corbould noted that, "CGI is a great tool and can be very useful, but I will fight to the tooth and nail to do something for real. It's the best way to go". Corbould used the 007 stage at Pinewood for the sinking of the Venetian house at the climax of the film, which featured the largest rig ever built for a Bond film. Casino Royale featured music composed by David Arnold, his fourth soundtrack for the Bond film series. Producers Michael G. Wilson and Barbara Broccoli announced on 26 July 2006 that Chris Cornell would perform the title song, entitled "You Know My Name", which he co-wrote with Arnold.

==== Quantum of Solace (2008) ====
In July 2006, as Casino Royale entered post-production, Eon Productions announced that the next film would be based on an original idea by producer Michael G. Wilson. In June 2007 Marc Forster was confirmed as director. He was surprised that he was approached for the job, stating he was not a big Bond film fan through the years, and that he would not have accepted the project had he not seen Casino Royale prior to making his decision: he felt Bond had been humanised in that film, arguing that because travelling the world had become less exotic since the series' advent, it made sense to focus more on Bond as a character. Forster found Casino Royale's 144-minute running time too long, and wanted his follow-up to be "tight and fast ... like a bullet".

Neal Purvis and Robert Wade returned as screenwriters and completed a draft of the script by April 2007; Paul Haggis also worked on the script, completing it two hours before the 2007–2008 Writers Guild of America strike officially began. Further work on the script had to be undertaken by Forster and Daniel Craig, who said later, "We had the bare bones of a script and then there was a writers' strike and there was nothing we could do. We couldn't employ a writer to finish it. I say to myself, 'Never again', but who knows? There was me trying to rewrite scenes – and a writer I am not". Craig also admitted that the film was not initially meant to be a sequel, but it became one because of the re-writes undertaken by him and Forster. Haggis located his draft's climax in the Swiss Alps, but Forster wanted the action sequences to allude to the four classical elements of earth, water, air and fire. Michael G. Wilson decided on the film's title Quantum of Solace only "a few days" before its announcement on 24 January 2008. Forster hired Dennis Gassner as production designer, replacing Peter Lamont.

Quantum of Solace was shot in six countries, including Italy (Talamone and Siena), Chile (the Paranal Observatory), Austria (Bregenz), Mexico, Panama and the UK. In the UK interior and exterior airport scenes were filmed at Farnborough Airfield and the snowy closing scenes were filmed at the Bruneval Barracks in Aldershot, as well as ten stages at Pinewood and two theatres for ADR work. David Arnold, who composed the scores for the previous four Bond films, returned for Quantum of Solace. He said that Forster likes to work very closely with his composers and that, in comparison to the accelerated schedule he was tied to on Casino Royale, the intention was to spend a long time scoring the film to "really work it out". He also said he would be "taking a different approach" with the score. Jack White of The White Stripes and Alicia Keys collaborated on "Another Way to Die", the first Bond music duet.

==== Skyfall (2012) ====
The production of Skyfall was suspended throughout 2010 because of MGM's financial troubles. Eon resumed pre-production following MGM's exit from bankruptcy on 21 December 2010, and in January 2011 the film was given official approval, with production scheduled to start in late 2011. The film's budget is estimated to be between $150 million and $200 million, compared to the $200 million spent on Quantum of Solace.

Skyfall was directed by Sam Mendes, who first signed on to the project shortly after Quantum of Solace was released and remained on board as a consultant during the period of uncertainty surrounding MGM's financial situation. Speculation in the media suggested that Mendes had commissioned rewrites of the script to "[remove] action scenes in favour of 'characterful performances'", with the intention of bidding for an Academy Award. Mendes denied the reports, stating that the film's planned action scenes were an important part of the overall film.

The script was written by Bond screenwriting regulars Neal Purvis and Robert Wade, as well as John Logan. Roger Deakins signed on as cinematographer, while Dennis Gassner returned as production designer. Thomas Newman, who worked with Sam Mendes as composer for American Beauty, Road to Perdition, Jarhead and Revolutionary Road, replaced David Arnold as composer; British singer-songwriter Adele co-wrote and recorded the film's theme song with her regular songwriter, Paul Epworth.

Principal photography was scheduled to take 133 days and began on 7 November 2011 in and around London. Production moved to Turkey in April 2012, with parts of Istanbul—including the Spice Bazaar, Yeni Camii, the Main Post Office, Sultanahmet Square and the Grand Bazaar—closed for filming in April. Filming also took place in Shanghai. Although set in Scotland, Bond's family home of Skyfall was constructed on Hankley Common in Surrey using plywood and plaster to build a full-scale model of the building, with some exterior scenes shot in Glen Etive and Glencoe.

==== Spectre (2015) ====
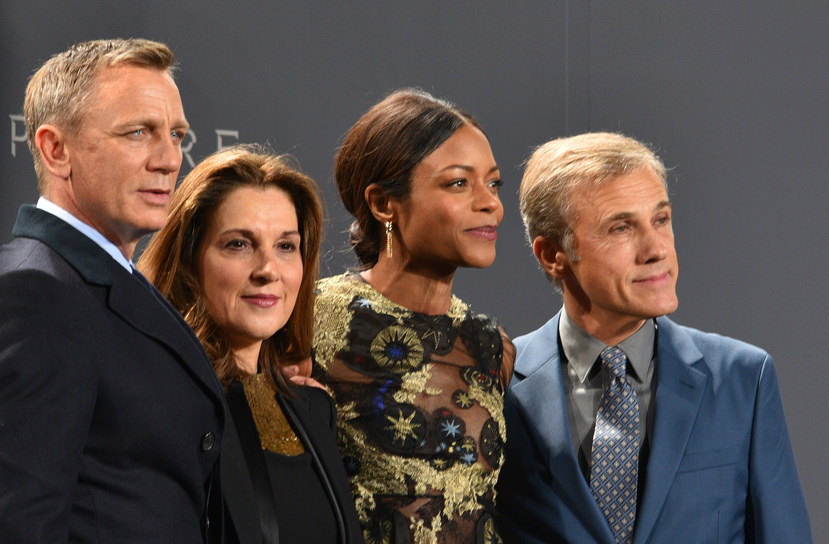
Daniel Craig (James Bond), producer Barbara Broccoli, actress Naomie Harris (Moneypenny) and actor Christoph Waltz (Blofeld) at the premiere for Spectre.

In September 2012 it was announced that Craig had signed to the role of Bond for the following two films, the first of which was Spectre, funded by MGM and Sony. In March 2013 Mendes announced he would not return to direct the next film in the series, although he later decided to return. In July 2013 it was revealed that John Logan would also return as writer, while in October 2014 it was announced that Léa Seydoux would play a Bond girl in the film. Filming started in December 2014 and the film was released into cinemas on 26 October 2015.

==== No Time to Die (2021) ====
No Time to Die, the twenty-fifth film in the Eon series, entered development in early 2016. Sony Pictures' contract to co-produce the series with MGM and Eon expired with the release of Spectre and the distribution rights to theatrically release the upcoming film were up for negotiation, until MGM announced a new international distribution agreement with Universal Pictures in May 2018. As part of the agreement, Universal handled the international and home video distribution for the film, while MGM retains the theatrical, digital, and television rights in the United States. The film was theatrically distributed by United Artists Releasing, the former joint venture between MGM and Annapurna Pictures.

In March 2017 Purvis and Wade were hired as co-screenwriters; that August, Craig was announced to be reprising his role as Bond. In March 2018 Danny Boyle signed on as director, for an original story co-written with John Hodge. That August, Boyle stepped down as director and co-writer because of creative differences; Hodge later left the project for similar reasons. By November, Paul Haggis had completed a rewrite of Purvis and Wade's draft of the script. In February 2019, it was confirmed that Scott Z. Burns was hired to rewrite an overhaul of the script.

In the search for a new director, the studio was reportedly considering Christopher McQuarrie, Jean-Marc Vallée, Edgar Wright, David Mackenzie, S. J. Clarkson, Bart Layton, and Yann Demange. But in September 2018, Cary Joji Fukunaga was announced as the film's director, the first American director of the Eon series.

Production was initially scheduled to begin on 3 December 2018 with a 25 October 2019 release date. However, production finally began in late March 2019 in Nittedal, Norway with its release date set for November 2019. It was originally set to release on 8 April 2020, but was eventually pushed back to 30 September 2021 due to the COVID-19 pandemic.

A report on the launch of the film on 25 April 2019 stated that Rami Malek had joined the cast as the villain. By that time, Daniel Craig had made it clear that this would be his final role as Bond. This film will begin with Bond no longer on active service and living in Jamaica, until Leiter requests his assistance in rescuing a kidnapped scientist. The final script was written by Purvis and Wade with the involvement of Scott Z. Burns and Phoebe Waller-Bridge. Parts of the film were to be undertaken in Jamaica, where much of the cast was present for the official announcement for Bond 25; other planned shooting locations included Matera, Italy, Norway and London, with interiors to be shot at Pinewood Studios.

=== Future ===
In February 2025, Amazon MGM and Michael G. Wilson and Barbara Broccoli of Eon Productions announced its intentions to form a joint venture to manage the franchise rights to James Bond. Following the closing of the transaction, Amazon MGM would have full creative control over the franchise. It was reported that Amazon MGM spent US$1 billion to acquire the creative rights to the franchise from Eon Productions.

In March 2025, Amazon MGM announced that Amy Pascal and David Heyman would oversee the franchise moving forward and produce future installments in the series through their Pascal Pictures and Heyday Films banners, respectively. In June 2025, Amazon MGM announced that Denis Villeneuve would direct the 26th James Bond film. In July, Amazon MGM announced that Steven Knight would write the film.

The casting search and auditions for the role of James Bond began in May 2026, with Nina Gold serving as casting director. According to Deadline, screen tests were scheduled in October 2026 with Jack Lowden, Josh O'Connor, and Callum Turner for the role of Bond. In November 2026, it was revealed that Robert Pattinson and Nicholas Hoult also auditioned for the role. That same month, Pattinson was announced as the new actor to play Bond. Pattinson reportedly signed to star in three James Bond films.

=== Core crew ===
Core crew on the Eon Productions film series
No.	Title	Director	Producer(s)	Writer(s)	Composer	Production or art designer	Editor or supervising editor	Cinematographer(s)	Title designer
1	Dr. No	Terence Young	Harry Saltzman & Albert R. Broccoli	Richard Maibaum, Johanna Harwood & Berkely Mather	Monty Norman	Ken Adam	Peter R. Hunt	Ted Moore	Maurice Binder
2	From Russia with Love	Terence Young	Harry Saltzman & Albert R. Broccoli	Richard Maibaum & Johanna Harwood	John Barry	Syd Cain	Peter R. Hunt	Ted Moore	Robert Brownjohn
3	Goldfinger	Guy Hamilton	Harry Saltzman & Albert R. Broccoli	Richard Maibaum & Paul Dehn	John Barry	Ken Adam	Peter R. Hunt	Ted Moore	Robert Brownjohn
4	Thunderball	Terence Young	Kevin McClory	Richard Maibaum & John Hopkins	John Barry	Ken Adam	Peter R. Hunt	Ted Moore	Maurice Binder
5	You Only Live Twice	Lewis Gilbert	Harry Saltzman & Albert R. Broccoli	Roald Dahl	John Barry	Ken Adam	Peter R. Hunt	Freddie Young	Maurice Binder
6	On Her Majesty's Secret Service	Peter R. Hunt	Harry Saltzman & Albert R. Broccoli	Richard Maibaum	John Barry	Syd Cain	John Glen	Michael Reed	Maurice Binder
7	Diamonds Are Forever	Guy Hamilton	Harry Saltzman & Albert R. Broccoli	Richard Maibaum & Tom Mankiewicz	John Barry	Ken Adam	Bert Bates & John W. Holmes	Ted Moore	Maurice Binder
8	Live and Let Die	Guy Hamilton	Harry Saltzman & Albert R. Broccoli	Tom Mankiewicz	George Martin	Syd Cain	Bert Bates, John Shirley & Raymond Poulton	Ted Moore	Maurice Binder
9	The Man with the Golden Gun	Guy Hamilton	Albert R. Broccoli & Harry Saltzman	Richard Maibaum & Tom Mankiewicz	John Barry	Peter Murton	John Shirley & Raymond Poulton	Ted Moore & Oswald Morris	Maurice Binder
10	The Spy Who Loved Me	Lewis Gilbert	Albert R. Broccoli	Christopher Wood & Richard Maibaum	Marvin Hamlisch	Ken Adam	John Glen	Claude Renoir	Maurice Binder
11	Moonraker	Lewis Gilbert	Albert R. Broccoli	Christopher Wood	John Barry	Ken Adam	John Glen	Jean Tournier	Maurice Binder
12	For Your Eyes Only	John Glen	Albert R. Broccoli	Richard Maibaum & Michael G. Wilson	Bill Conti	Peter Lamont	John Grover	Alan Hume	Maurice Binder
13	Octopussy	John Glen	Albert R. Broccoli	George MacDonald Fraser, Richard Maibaum & Michael G. Wilson	John Barry	Peter Lamont	John Grover (sup.), Peter Davies, Henry Richardson	Alan Hume	Maurice Binder
14	A View to a Kill	John Glen	Albert R. Broccoli & Michael G. Wilson	Richard Maibaum & Michael G. Wilson	John Barry	Peter Lamont	Peter Davies	Alan Hume	Maurice Binder
15	The Living Daylights	John Glen	Albert R. Broccoli & Michael G. Wilson	Richard Maibaum & Michael G. Wilson	John Barry	Peter Lamont	John Grover & Peter Davies	Alec Mills	Maurice Binder
16	Licence to Kill	John Glen	Albert R. Broccoli & Michael G. Wilson	Michael G. Wilson & Richard Maibaum	Michael Kamen	Peter Lamont	John Grover	Alec Mills	Maurice Binder
17	GoldenEye	Martin Campbell	Michael G. Wilson & Barbara Broccoli	Jeffrey Caine, Bruce Feirstein & Michael France	Éric Serra	Peter Lamont	Terry Rawlings	Phil Méheux	Daniel Kleinman
18	Tomorrow Never Dies	Roger Spottiswoode	Michael G. Wilson & Barbara Broccoli	Bruce Feirstein	David Arnold	Allan Cameron	Michel Arcand & Dominique Fortin	Robert Elswit	Daniel Kleinman
19	The World Is Not Enough	Michael Apted	Michael G. Wilson & Barbara Broccoli	Neal Purvis, Robert Wade & Bruce Feirstein	David Arnold	Peter Lamont	Jim Clark	Adrian Biddle	Daniel Kleinman
20	Die Another Day	Lee Tamahori	Michael G. Wilson & Barbara Broccoli	Neal Purvis and Robert Wade	David Arnold	Peter Lamont	Christian Wagner	David Tattersall	Daniel Kleinman
21	Casino Royale	Martin Campbell	Michael G. Wilson & Barbara Broccoli	Neal Purvis, Robert Wade & Paul Haggis	David Arnold	Peter Lamont	Stuart Baird	Phil Méheux	Daniel Kleinman
22	Quantum of Solace	Marc Forster	Michael G. Wilson & Barbara Broccoli	Paul Haggis and Neal Purvis and Robert Wade	David Arnold	Dennis Gassner	Matt Chessé & Rick Pearson	Roberto Schaefer	MK12
23	Skyfall	Sam Mendes	Michael G. Wilson & Barbara Broccoli	Neal Purvis, Robert Wade & John Logan	Thomas Newman	Dennis Gassner	Stuart Baird & Kate Baird	Roger Deakins	Daniel Kleinman
24	Spectre	Sam Mendes	Michael G. Wilson & Barbara Broccoli	John Logan & Neal Purvis, Robert Wade & Jez Butterworth	Thomas Newman	Dennis Gassner	Lee Smith	Hoyte van Hoytema	Daniel Kleinman
25	No Time to Die	Cary Joji Fukunaga	Michael G. Wilson & Barbara Broccoli	Neal Purvis, Robert Wade, Cary Joji Fukunaga & Phoebe Waller-Bridge	Hans Zimmer	Mark Tildesley	Elliot Graham & Tom Cross	Linus Sandgren	Daniel Kleinman
26	Bond 26 (upcoming)	Denis Villeneuve	Amy Pascal & David Heyman	Steven Knight	TBA	TBA	Joe Walker	TBA	TBA

== Non-Eon films ==
=== Charles K. Feldman (1967) ===
In March 1955 Ian Fleming sold the film rights of his novel Casino Royale to producer Gregory Ratoff for $6,000 ($72,112 in 2025 dollars). In 1956 Ratoff set up a production company with Michael Garrison to produce Casino Royale; Ratoff died in December 1960. After Ratoff's death, producer Charles K. Feldman represented Ratoff's widow and obtained the rights to film.

==== Casino Royale (1967) ====
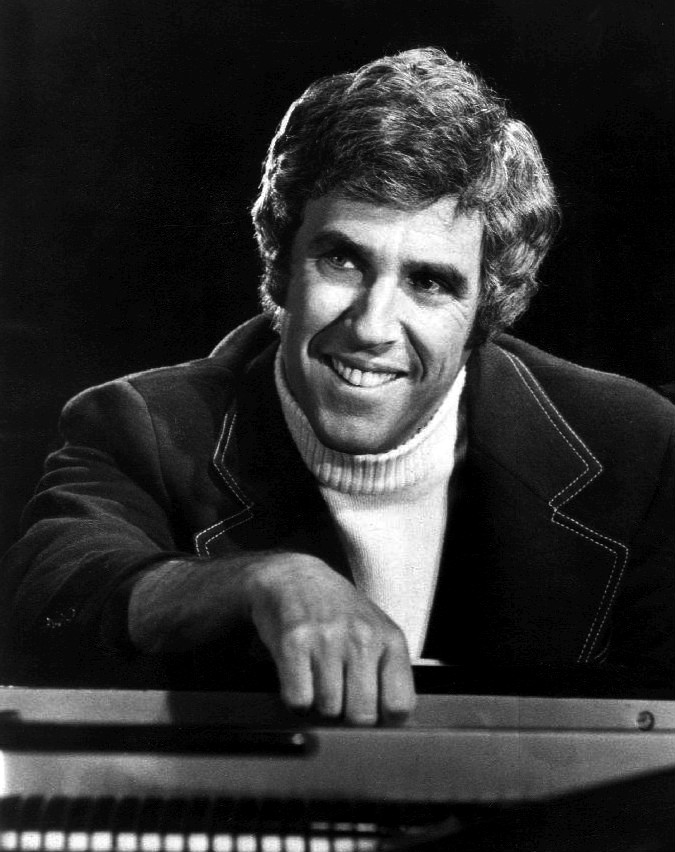
Burt Bacharach, who scored the 1967 film Casino Royale

Production on Casino Royale was troubled and chaotic, with five different directors being credited for helming different segments of the film: Ken Hughes, John Huston, Joseph McGrath, Robert Parrish and Val Guest. In addition, stunt director Richard Talmadge was uncredited as co-director of the final sequence. Ben Hecht was originally commissioned by Feldman as writer, and he provided a serious interpretation of Fleming's source novel, before it was decided to turn the film into a comedy. Three main screenwriters then worked on the project—Wolf Mankowitz, John Law, and Michael Sayers—and a further nine people provided uncredited additional material. Problems arose on set between Peter Sellers and director Joseph McGrath and between Sellers and Orson Welles. Sellers eventually demanded that he and Welles should not share the same set. Sellers left the film before his part was complete. A further agent's part was then written for Terence Cooper, to cover Sellers' departure, (Note: Various theories have been given about the animosity between the two actors, including Sellers trying to get Welles to laugh and Welles not responding; Sellers hearing a young woman comment that Welles was sexy; Sellers' comments about Welles' weight being objected to; and Sellers' jealousy at Welles' friendship with Princess Margaret, who was also a friend of Sellers. Sellers' biographer Peter Evans declared that, "the real reason for this ... hostility is still uncertain", while another biographer, Ed Sikov commented that others were as much to blame for problems with the film.) while re-writes, additional filming and post-production cutting compensated for the missing actor. Principal photography started on 11 January 1966 and was scheduled to take up to 26 weeks. Because of the delays and chaotic nature of the filming process, it finally finished ten months later in November.

Feldman asked Burt Bacharach and Hal David to provide the music for the film; David worked for a few months completing his part, while Bacharach took nearly two years. The pair produced the song "The Look of Love", which was sung by Dusty Springfield. Columbia Pictures approved a production budget of $6 million for the film, although this rose to $12 million at the end of production. The film performed well, with box office returns of $41.7 million.

=== Jack Schwartzman (1983) ===
Never Say Never Again had its origins in the early 1960s following the controversy over the 1961 Thunderball novel, which led to Kevin McClory becoming producer of the Eon Productions film of the same name. Part of the agreement between McClory and Eon was that McClory would not make any further version of the novel for a period of ten years following the release of the 1965 Thunderball.

In the mid-1970s McClory again started working on a project to bring a Thunderball adaptation to production and, with the working title Warhead (a.k.a. James Bond of the Secret Service) he brought writer Len Deighton together with Sean Connery to work on a script. The script ran into difficulties after accusations from Eon Productions that the project had gone beyond copyright restrictions, which confined McClory to a film based on the Thunderball novel only, and once again the project was deferred. Towards the end of the 1970s developments were reported on the project under the name James Bond of the Secret Service, but then producer Jack Schwartzman became involved and cleared a number of the legal issues that still surrounded the project and licensed the rights from McClory.

==== Never Say Never Again (1983) ====
With Connery still committed to the project, producer Jack Schwartzman asked him to play Bond: Connery accepted, asking for and receiving a fee of $3 million ($10 million in 2025 dollars), a percentage of the profits, as well as casting, script and director approval. Schwartzman then brought on board scriptwriter Lorenzo Semple Jr. to work on the screenplay. Connery was unhappy with some aspects of the work and asked British television writers Dick Clement and Ian La Frenais to undertake re-writes, although they went uncredited for their efforts because of a restriction by the Writers Guild of America.

The former Eon Productions editor and director of On Her Majesty's Secret Service, Peter Hunt, was approached to direct the film but declined due to his previous work with Eon. Irvin Kershner, who had achieved success in 1980 with The Empire Strikes Back, was then hired. A number of the crew from the 1981 film Raiders of the Lost Ark were also appointed, including first assistant director David Tomblin; director of photography Douglas Slocombe and production designers Philip Harrison and Stephen Grimes.

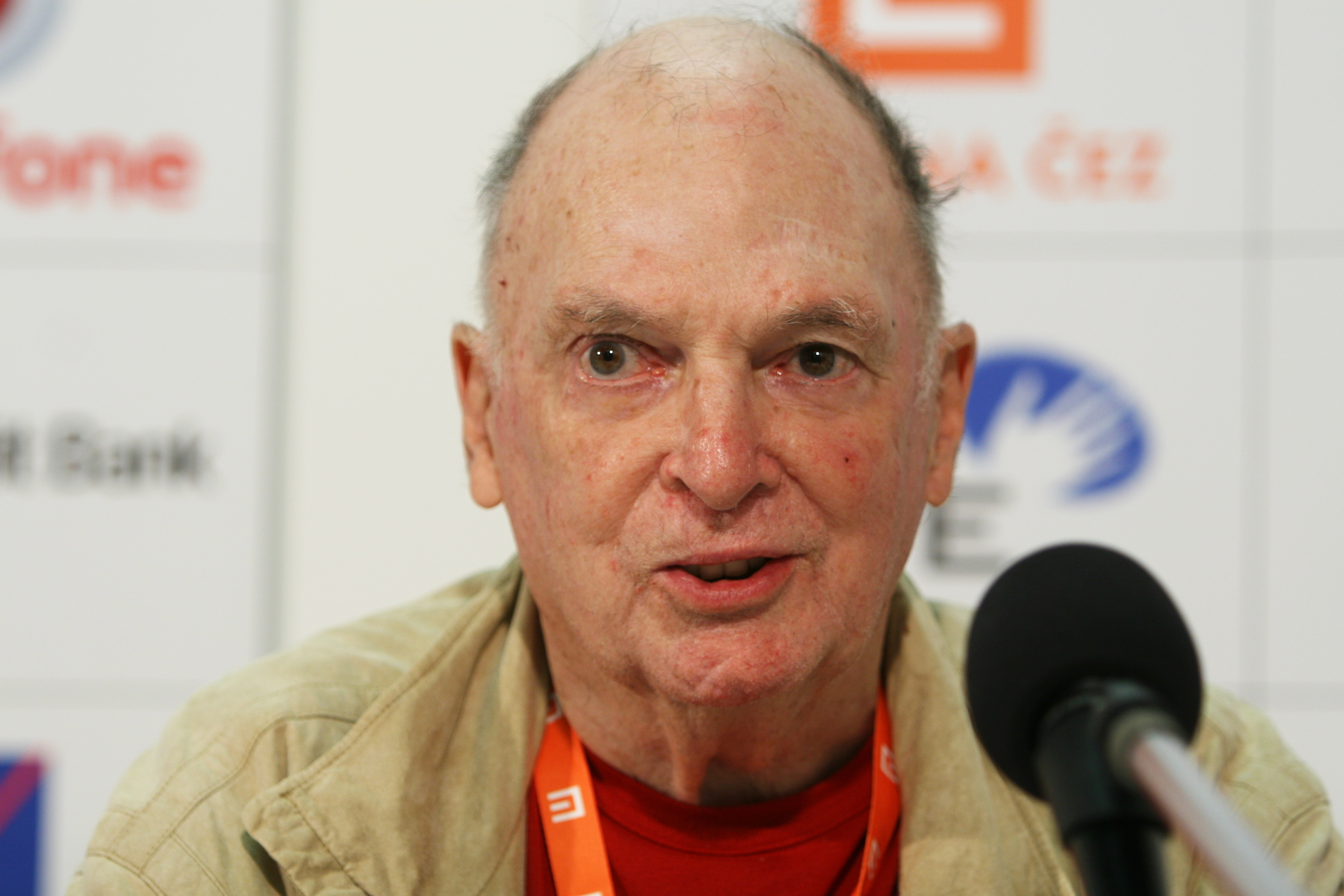
Lorenzo Semple Jr., who wrote the screenplay for Never Say Never Again

Filming for Never Say Never Again began on 27 September 1982 on the French Riviera for two months before moving to Nassau, the Bahamas in mid-November where filming took place at Clifton Pier, which was also one of the locations used in Thunderball. The Spanish city of Almería was also used as a location. Villain Maximillian Largo's Palmyran fortress was actually historic Fort Carré in Antibes. Principal photography finished at Elstree Studios where interior shots were filmed. Elstree also housed the "Tears of Allah" underwater cavern, which took three months to construct. Most of the filming was completed in the spring of 1983, although there was some additional shooting during the summer of 1983.

Production on the film was troubled with Connery taking on many of the production duties with assistant director David Tomblin. Director Irvin Kershner was critical of producer Jack Schwartzman, saying that whilst he was a good businessman "he didn't have the experience of a film producer". After the production ran out of money, Schwartzman had to fund further production out of his own pocket and later admitted he had underestimated the amount the film would cost to make.

The music for Never Say Never Again was written by Michel Legrand. Legrand also wrote the main theme "Never Say Never Again", which featured lyrics by Alan and Marilyn Bergman—who had also worked with Legrand in the Academy Award-winning song "The Windmills of Your Mind"—and was performed by Lani Hall.

Fleming's estate, financially backed by Eon Productions and MGM, made a final attempt to block the film in the High Courts in London in the spring of 1983, but this was thrown out by the court and Never Say Never Again was permitted to proceed. When Never Say Never Again was released, it grossed $9.72 million ($31 million in 2025 dollars) on its first weekend, which was reported to be "the best opening record of any James Bond film" up to that point and surpassing Octopussy's $8.9 million ($29 million in 2025 dollars) from June that year. From its budget of $36 million, Never Say Never Again grossed $160 million.

==== Cancelled sequel and reboot ====
Schwartzman had the option to license the film rights for a sequel to Never Say Never Again from McClory for $5 million. McClory even announced the planned next film S.P.E.C.T.R.E in February 1984 with a full-page advertisement in Screen International. However, Schwartzman decided against producing a second film when Sean Connery refused to work with him again as Bond.

McClory attempted to produce another Thunderball adaptation as Warhead 2000 AD following the success of GoldenEye in 1995. Liam Neeson and Timothy Dalton were considered for 007, while Roland Emmerich and Dean Devlin were developing the film at Columbia Pictures. MGM launched a $25 million lawsuit against Sony, and McClory claimed a portion of the $3 billion profits from the Bond series. After a prolonged lawsuit, Sony backed down, and McClory eventually exhausted all legal avenues to pursue. As part of the settlement, MGM paid $10 million for the rights to Casino Royale, which had come into Sony's possession.

=== Lisa Osborne (2012) ===
==== Happy and Glorious (2012) ====
Daniel Craig played Bond in a short film, Happy and Glorious, produced by Lisa Osborne for the BBC and directed by Danny Boyle as part of the opening ceremony of the 2012 Summer Olympics in London. In the film Bond is summoned to Buckingham Palace by Queen Elizabeth II—played by herself—and escorts her by helicopter to the Olympic Stadium, where they both jump from the helicopter into the stadium with Union Flag parachutes.

For the parachute jump, Bond and the Queen were played respectively by BASE jumpers and stuntmen Mark Sutton and Gary Connery. After the film was shown, the Queen entered the stadium via conventional means in the same outfit and formally opened the Games.

== See also ==
- Motifs in the James Bond film series
- List of recurring actors in the James Bond film series
- List of recurring characters in the James Bond film series
- List of James Bond films

== Notes and references ==
=== Sources ===
- Balio, Tino (1987). United Artists: the company that changed the film industry. Madison: University of Wisconsin Press. ISBN 978-0-299-11440-4.
- Barnes, Alan; Hearn, Marcus (2001). Kiss Kiss Bang! Bang!: the Unofficial James Bond Film Companion. London: Batsford Books. ISBN 978-0-7134-8182-2.
- Benson, Raymond (1988). The James Bond Bedside Companion. London: Boxtree Ltd. ISBN 978-1-85283-233-9.
- Black, Jeremy (2005). The Politics of James Bond: from Fleming's Novel to the Big Screen. Westport: University of Nebraska Press. ISBN 978-0-8032-6240-9.
- Block, Alex Ben; Autrey Wilson, Lucy (2010). George Lucas's Blockbusting: A Decade-by-Decade Survey of Timeless Movies Including Untold Secrets of Their Financial and Cultural Success. London: HarperCollins. ISBN 978-0-06-177889-6.
- Bouzerau, Laurent (2006). The Art of Bond. London: Macmillan Publishers. ISBN 978-0-7522-1551-8.
- Broccoli, Albert R (1998). When the Snow Melts. London: Boxtree. ISBN 978-0-7522-1162-6.
- Burlingame, Jon (2012). The Music of James Bond. Oxford: Oxford University Press. ISBN 978-0-19-986330-3.
- Chapman, James (2009). Licence to Thrill: A Cultural History of the James Bond Films. New York: I.B. Tauris. ISBN 978-1-84511-515-9.
- Cockburn, Alexander (1988). Corruptions of Empire: Life Studies & the Reagan Era. London: Verso Books. ISBN 978-0-86091-940-7.
- Cork, John; Scivally, Bruce (2002). James Bond: The Legacy 007. Harry N. Abrams. ISBN 978-0-8109-8252-9.
- Cork, John; Stutz, Collin (2007). James Bond Encyclopedia. London: Dorling Kindersley. ISBN 978-1-4053-3427-3.
- Dimare, Philip C. (2011). Movies in American History: An Encyclopedia. Santa Barbara: ABC-CLIO. ISBN 978-1-59884-296-8.
- Evans, Peter (1980). The Mask Behind the Mask. London: Severn House Publishers. ISBN 978-0-7278-0688-8.
- Fiegel, Eddi (1998). John Barry: a sixties theme: from James Bond to Midnight Cowboy. London: Constable & Robinson. ISBN 978-0-09-478530-4.
- Frayling, Christopher (2005). Ken Adam and the Art of Production Design. London: Faber and Faber. ISBN 978-0-571-22057-1.
- Goldsmith, Ben; O'Regan, Tom (2005). The Film Studio: Film Production in the Global Economy. Lanham: Rowman & Littlefield. ISBN 978-0-7425-3681-4.
- Guinness World Records 2014. Guinness World Records Ltd. 2013. ISBN 978-1-908843-15-9.
- Heard, Christopher (2000). Ten Thousand Bullets: The Cinematic Journey of John Woo. Los Angeles: Lone Eagle Publishing. ISBN 978-1-58065-021-2.
- Lewis, Roger (1995). The Life and Death of Peter Sellers. London: Arrow Books. ISBN 978-0-09-974700-0.
- LIFE: 50 Years of James Bond. Des Moines: Time Inc. 2012. ISBN 978-1-61893-031-6.
- Lindner, Christoph (2009). The James Bond Phenomenon: a Critical Reader. Manchester: Manchester University Press. ISBN 978-0-7190-6541-5.
- Lipp, Deborah (2006). The Ultimate James Bond Fan Book. New York: Sterling & Ross Publishers. ISBN 978-0-9766372-8-8.
- Lycett, Andrew (1996). Ian Fleming. London: Phoenix. ISBN 978-1-85799-783-5.
- Macintyre, Ben (2008). For Your Eyes Only. London: Bloomsbury Publishing. ISBN 978-0-7475-9527-4.
- Mayer, Geoff (2003). Guide to British Cinema. Westport: Greenwood Publishing Group. ISBN 978-0-313-30307-4.
- McGilligan, Patrick (1986). Backstory: Interviews with Screenwriters of Hollywood's Golden Age. Berkeley: University of California Press. ISBN 978-0-520-05689-3.
- Moore, Roger (2012). Bond on Bond. London: Michael O'Mara Books. ISBN 978-1-84317-861-3.
- Pfeiffer, Lee; Worrall, Dave (1998). The essential Bond. London: Boxtree Ltd. ISBN 978-0-7522-2477-0.
- Priggé, Steven (2004). Movie Moguls Speak: Interviews With Top Film Producers. Jefferson: McFarland & Company. ISBN 978-0-7864-1929-6.
- Reeves, Tony (2001). The Worldwide Guide to Movie Locations. Chicago: A Cappella. ISBN 978-1-55652-432-5.
- Rubin, Steven Jay (2003). The Complete James Bond Movie Encyclopedia. New York: Contemporary Books. ISBN 978-0-07-141246-9.
- Sellers, Robert (2008). The Battle for Bond. London: Tomahawk Press. ISBN 978-0-9557670-0-5.
- Sibley, Brian (2010). Peter Jackson: A Film-maker's Journey. London: HarperCollins. ISBN 978-0-00-736431-2.
- Sikov, Ed (2002). Mr Strangelove; A Biography of Peter Sellers. London: Sidgwick & Jackson. ISBN 978-0-283-07297-0.
- Simpson, Paul (2002). The Rough Guide to James Bond. London: Rough Guides. ISBN 978-1-84353-142-5.
- Smith, Jim; Lavington, Stephen (2002). Bond Films. London: Virgin Books. ISBN 978-0-7535-0709-4.
- Walker, Alexander (1981). Peter Sellers. Littlehampton: Littlehampton Book Services. ISBN 978-0-297-77965-0.
- Yeffeth, Glenn, ed. (2006). James Bond in the 21st century: why we still need 007. Dallas: BenBella Books. ISBN 978-1-933771-02-1.
