= Motifs in the James Bond film series =

James Bond film motifs

- The current official logo of the James Bond (007) Eon series
- Based on: James Bond by Ian Fleming
- Produced by: Harry Saltzman (1－3, 5－9); Albert R. Broccoli (1－3, 5－16); Kevin McClory (4); Michael G. Wilson (14－); Barbara Broccoli (17－)
- Starring: Sean Connery; George Lazenby; Roger Moore; Timothy Dalton; Pierce Brosnan; Daniel Craig (Full list below)
- Music by: Monty Norman; John Barry; David Arnold; Thomas Newman; Others
- Production companies: Eon Productions; United Artists; Danjaq; Les Productions Artistes Associés; Metro-Goldwyn-Mayer; Columbia Pictures; Babelsberg Studio; Stillking Films; Universal Pictures
- Distributed by: United Artists (1－12); Metro-Goldwyn-Mayer (13－20, U.S. only); United International Pictures (13－19, international); 20th Century Fox (20, international); Sony Pictures Releasing (21－24); Universal Pictures (25－, international); United Artists Releasing (25－, U.S. only)
- Countries: United Kingdom; United States
- Budget: Total (24 Eon films): $1,400,000,000
- Box office: Total (24 Eon films): $6,838,530,927

The James Bond series of films contain a number of repeating, distinctive motifs which date from the series' inception with Dr. No in 1962. The series consists of twenty five films produced by Eon Productions featuring the James Bond character, a fictional British Secret Service agent. The most recent installment is No Time to Die, released in UK cinemas on 30 September 2021. There have also been two independently made features, the satirical Casino Royale, released in 1967, and the 1983 film Never Say Never Again.

Whilst each element has not appeared in every Bond film, they are common threads that run through most of the films. These motifs vary from integral plot points, such as the assignment briefing sessions or the attempts to kill Bond, to enhancements of the dramatic narrative, such as music, or aspects of the visual style, such as the title sequences. These motifs may also serve to enhance excitement in the plot, through a chase sequence or for the climax of the film. Some of these—such as "Bond girls" or megalomaniac villains—have been present in all of the stories, whilst others—such as Q's gadgets or the role of M—have changed over time, often to shape or follow the contemporary zeitgeist. These elements are formulaic and the Bond films tend to follow a set pattern with only limited variety, often following within a strict order. A number of the elements were altered or removed in 2006 with the reboot of the series, Casino Royale.

Some of the elements involved are a result of the production crew used in the earliest films in the series, with the work of Ken Adam, the original production designer, Maurice Binder, title designer, and John Barry, composer, continually updated and adapted as the series progressed.

== Opening sequences ==
=== Gun barrel sequence ===
The gun barrel sequence

All of the Eon Bond films feature the unique gun barrel sequence, created by graphic artist Maurice Binder, which has been called by British media historian James Chapman "the trademark motif of the series". As Bond walks across the screen, he is viewed by the audience through the barrel of a gun trained on him by an unknown assailant. Bond wheels around and shoots directly at the gun/viewer, followed by the assassin's blood spilling down the barrel/screen. It was originally filmed in sepia by putting a pinhole camera inside an actual .38 calibre gun barrel, with stunt man Bob Simmons playing the part of Bond. (Note: As stuntman Bob Simmons played Bond for the first gun barrel sequence, which occurred before the film had started, he is technically the first cinematic Bond.) The remake of the sequence for the wide-screen Thunderball featured Connery as Bond. This is accompanied by the opening bars of the "James Bond Theme", composed by Monty Norman, orchestrated by trumpeter and composer John Barry and Burt Rhodes.

After Maurice Binder's death in 1991, Daniel Kleinman was responsible for the gun barrel sequence up to and including Casino Royale. Design house MK12 supervised the graphics for Quantum of Solace. Chapman has suggested that the sequence is a significant part of the James Bond mythos because it "foregrounds the motif of looking" that is central to the spy film genre. The gun barrel imagery sometimes carried over to the film posters used to promote Bond films, including as a familiarising element on the introduction of Timothy Dalton for The Living Daylights.

The sequence was traditionally placed at the start of each film until the 2006 instalment Casino Royale, where it appears at the end of the cold open and is incorporated into the plot; in the 2008 film, Quantum of Solace, the sequence was placed at the end of the film and incorporates the film's title in its design.

For Skyfall, director Sam Mendes had wanted to return the gun barrel to the start of the film but in editing realised that the sequence was similar to his opening shot of the film. Because of this, the sequence was placed at the end of the film fading into a 50th Anniversary logo. In Spectre the sequence returns to the start of the film and also returns to the classic Binder design. This time the barrel fades into a title card that reads "The Dead Are Alive" (a sentence which seems to be explained by the fact that the picture starts in Mexico City during the Day of the Dead, as remarked by the next subtitle/title card, but can be later explicated by the presence of the seemingly deceased character of Franz Oberhauser, alias "Ernst Stavro Blofeld"). The gun barrel remains at the opening for Craig's final film, No Time to Die, but with a difference: instead of blood following the shot taken by Bond, it instead has Bond fade into the background, possibly foreshadowing his fate at the end of the film.

=== Pre-title sequence ===
In the first film of the series, Dr. No, the gun barrel sequence is followed by the main titles, but starting with From Russia with Love and in all subsequent films, the titles are preceded by a pre-title sequence or "teaser". The contents of the sequence can relate to the main plot of the film in a number of ways, including being not at all related (as in Goldfinger), loosely connected (as with The Man with the Golden Gun or The World Is Not Enough) or fully related to the plot (as can be seen in Licence to Kill and On Her Majesty's Secret Service).

From Thunderball through to Die Another Day, the gun barrel sequence segues into the pre-title sequence by having the opening shot be sighted through the barrel. Beginning with The Spy Who Loved Me, the teasers emphasised not only action sequences but stunts, a practice that prevailed until Casino Royale. At over fourteen minutes, the sequence for The World Is Not Enough is two to three times the length of most others in the series. No Time to Die surpassed this in 2021 with a pre-title sequence that runs twenty minutes.

=== Title sequence ===
James Bond title sequences feature striking images often of women in provocative situations.

The main title sequences incorporate visual elements that often reflect each film's theme, often showing silhouettes of nude or provocatively clad women set against swirling images. For example, the 1965 film Thunderball features scenes of deep-sea diving and this is reflected in the associated opening sequence; similarly the opening sequence for the 1964 film Goldfinger shows clips from Bond films projected onto the gold-painted silhouette of actress Margaret Nolan: the titles have been described by Bond scholars Smith and Lavington as "Gorgeous, iconic, seminal."

The concept for the titles came from designer Robert Brownjohn, who worked on From Russia with Love and Goldfinger, before he fell out with producer Harry Saltzman and left the series. In creating the titles, Brownjohn was inspired by seeing light projecting on people's bodies as they got up and left a cinema; he was also influenced by constructivist artist László Moholy-Nagy projecting light on to clouds in the 1920s. Brownjohn also used the effect in the poster he created for Goldfinger. Designer Maurice Binder, who had worked on the first Bond film, Dr. No, had been unable to work on either From Russia with Love and Goldfinger, but returned for Thunderball, where he retained Brownjohn's concept for the titles. Binder eventually worked on thirteen Bond films and after his death in 1991, the opening credits were done by Daniel Kleinman. This changed for Quantum of Solace, with the studio MK12 taking control. However, Kleinman returned to direct the title sequences for the following three Craig films.

A contemporary artist usually sings during the title sequence and an instrumental version of the main track may also be featured as a leitmotif during the film, which repeats in various moods. Writing for Rolling Stone, Andy Greene says that "James Bond title songs, as a rule, have the name of the movie in the chorus," though he notes that this is not always the case. On Her Majesty's Secret Service has an entirely instrumental credit sequence, though the film features an alternate theme, "We Have All the Time in the World", sung by Louis Armstrong. Until the Daniel Craig era, only "Nobody Does It Better" and "All Time High" served as an opening theme without sharing a title with the movie. John Barry provided the title song music on ten of the eleven films for which he composed the musical score. Several of the songs produced for the films have been nominated for Academy Awards for Original Song and become pop hits, including Paul McCartney's "Live and Let Die", Carly Simon's "Nobody Does It Better" (for the film The Spy Who Loved Me), and Sheena Easton's "For Your Eyes Only" with Adele's "Skyfall" and Sam Smith's "Writing's on the Wall" (for Spectre) eventually winning the award.

== Plot elements ==
=== Flirting with Moneypenny ===
Lois Maxwell (twice), Samantha Bond and Caroline Bliss as Moneypenny

With the exception of the first two Daniel Craig films, Casino Royale and Quantum of Solace, every Bond film has a sequence in which Bond interacts with Miss Moneypenny, the personal assistant to M, Bond's superior. Lois Maxwell was the first to portray Moneypenny and did so for fourteen Eon-produced Bond films from Dr. No in 1962 to A View to a Kill in 1985 opposite Connery, Lazenby, and Moore. She was followed by Caroline Bliss, Samantha Bond and Naomie Harris, who played opposite Dalton, Brosnan and Craig respectively. The four have arguably divergent interpretations of Moneypenny's personality, as do the six actors who have played Bond.

A running joke throughout the film series is Moneypenny's unrequited love for Bond and his playful flirting with her. She flirts back, jokes and sometimes pouts, hoping to wrangle a proposal and a wedding ring out of him. A fantasy sequence in Die Another Day marks the only occasion in the Eon film series in which Moneypenny was actually shown in a romantic embrace with Bond, although this is only in Q-branch's virtual reality machine.

=== Receiving assignment from M ===
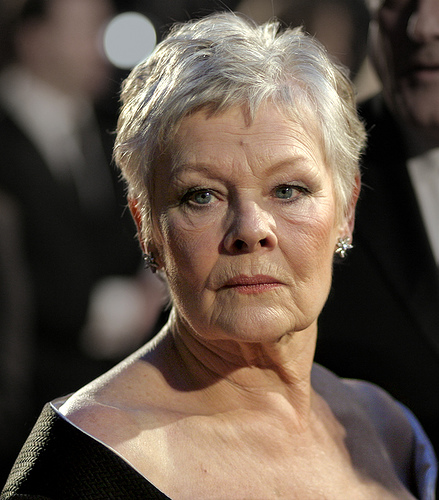
Judi Dench has played M seven times, the only woman in a role previously played by two men in the Eon films.

Early in most plots Bond is called in to see M, the head of the UK's Secret Intelligence Service (also known as MI6) in his or her office to receive his assignment. In several films, Bond receives the assignment outside the MI6 offices, or at a local secret office. Bond often finds M in a subdued state of agitation over a new threat to world peace. M typically shows confidence in the service's best agent but feels a need to rein in Bond for his risky methods and often chides him for his indiscretions.

The first actor to portray M was Bernard Lee, who appeared in all eleven Bond films from Dr. No in 1962 to Moonraker in 1979. With Lee's illness from stomach cancer in 1980–1981, he was unable to appear in his scenes for For Your Eyes Only; he died on 16 January 1981 and, out of respect, no new actor was hired to assume the role for the film. Instead, the script was re-written so that the character is said to be on leave, letting Chief of Staff Bill Tanner take over the role as acting head of MI6 and briefing Bond alongside the Minister of Defence.

Lee was replaced for four films between 1983 and 1989, by Robert Brown who had previously appeared in the series as Admiral Hargreaves. Judi Dench took over the role of M from 1995's GoldenEye until 2012's Skyfall. In Skyfall, Gareth Mallory, played by Ralph Fiennes, takes over as M at the end of the film after the death of Dench's character.

In the books, "Universal Export" (later "Transworld Corporation") serves as a cover for the British Secret Service. In the films, "Universal Exports" or variations thereof are used, such as the abbreviation "UnivEx" in From Russia with Love, a brass name plate in On Her Majesty's Secret Service, and Bond's helicopter in For Your Eyes Only. Academic Paul Stock argues that M's office—and Universal Exports by extension—is a metonym for England, whilst he sees M as being an iconic representative of England and Englishness.

=== Technical briefing with Q ===
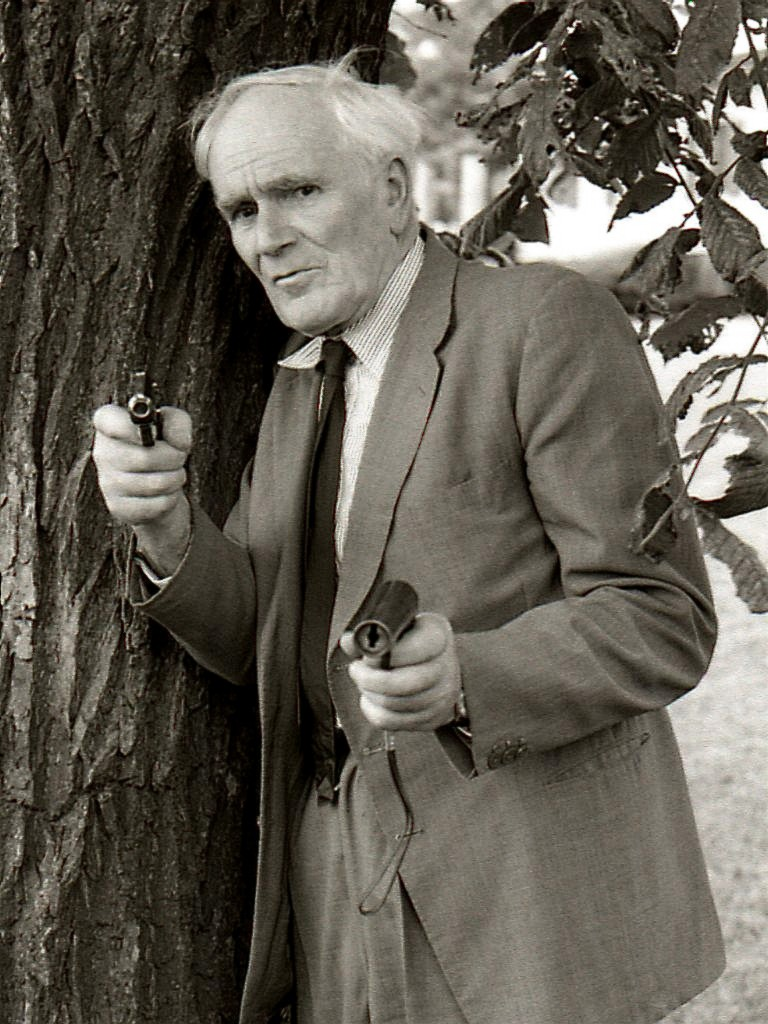
Desmond Llewelyn played Q seventeen times, the only actor to play opposite five different Bonds.

After getting his assignment, Bond is often sent to Q Branch for the technical briefing in which he receives special equipment to be used in his mission. The pre-mission briefings quickly became one of the motifs that ran through the Bond series. Dr. No provided no spy-related gadgets, although a Geiger counter was used. Industrial designer Andy Davey observed that the first ever onscreen spy-gadget was the attaché case shown in From Russia with Love, which he described as "a classic 007 product". The gadgets assumed a higher profile in the 1964 film Goldfinger and the film's success encouraged further espionage equipment from Q Branch to be supplied to Bond, although the increased use of technology led to an accusation that Bond was over-reliant on equipment, particularly in the later films.

Starting with From Russia with Love, the briefings with Q branch involve various gadgets and technology, although Boothroyd is not referred to in the credits as Q until the third film, Goldfinger. Each Bond film thereafter up until Die Another Day contains a technical briefing of some kind, usually given by Q, with the exception of Live and Let Die, in which Q does not appear and On Her Majesty's Secret Service in which Q does not brief 007 but is demonstrating to M.

Q is sometimes shown joining Bond in the field, taking with him a portable workshop and his staff. These workshops are established in unusual locations, such as an Egyptian tomb in The Spy Who Loved Me and a South American monastery in Moonraker. On three occasions, in Octopussy, Licence to Kill and Spectre, Q takes active roles in Bond's missions. For the 2006 Casino Royale reboot and the subsequent instalment, Quantum of Solace, the character of Q was, like Moneypenny, dropped, and although Bond still receives a supply of mission equipment, no technical briefing is shown on screen. The technical briefings resume, under the tutelage of Q, in Skyfall and Spectre.

If it hadn't been for Q Branch, you'd have been dead long ago!

— Q, to Bond,
Licence to Kill

There are several running jokes throughout the series. Established in Goldfinger is Q's continuing disgust at how his equipment is often lost, damaged or destroyed by Bond during missions. Another is how easily distracted Bond is in the lab ("Now pay attention") as Q rattles off details about the use of the equipment which Bond needs to commit to memory. Another part of the customary byplay between Q and Bond is Bond's amused reaction to the latest devices and the Quartermaster's indignant response ("I never joke about my work"). There are also sight gags showing prototype equipment. In the field, however, Bond always remembers the details and takes full advantage of the tools supplied.

Desmond Llewelyn played Q in seventeen Bond films, appearing in more Bond films than any other actor, where he worked with the first five James Bond actors. Llewelyn's first film was the second in the Eon series, From Russia with Love, after the actor who played the part in Dr. No, Peter Burton, was unavailable for the filming schedule. (Burton's character was not yet called Q, but "the Armourer", Major Boothroyd, who instructed Bond on a new firearm, the Walther PPK.) After appearing as Q's assistant 'R' in The World Is Not Enough, John Cleese appeared as Q in Pierce Brosnan and Desmond Llewelyn's last film, Die Another Day. For Daniel Craig's third film, Skyfall, the character was re-introduced, with Ben Whishaw playing the part.

=== Guns, cars and aircraft ===
Guns

The first Bond film, Dr. No, saw M ordering Bond to leave his Beretta behind and take up the Walther PPK, which the film Bond used in eighteen films. From Tomorrow Never Dies until Casino Royale, Bond's main weapon was the Walther P99 semi-automatic pistol, and starting in Quantum of Solace, Bond returned to using the PPK.

Cars

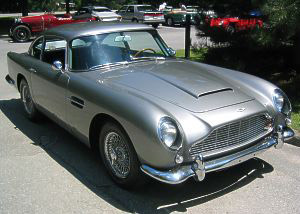
The Aston Martin DB5

Bond has driven a number of cars, including the Aston Martin V8 Vantage during the 1980s, the V12 Vanquish and DBS during the 2000s, as well as the Lotus Esprit; the BMW Z3, BMW 750iL and the BMW Z8. He has, however, also needed to drive a number of other vehicles, ranging from a Citroën 2CV to an AEC Regent III RT bus, amongst others.

Bond's most famous car is the silver grey Aston Martin DB5, first seen in Goldfinger; it later featured in Thunderball, GoldenEye, Tomorrow Never Dies, Casino Royale, Skyfall, Spectre, and No Time to Die. The films have used a number of different Aston Martins for filming and publicity, one of which was sold in January 2006 at an auction in the US for $2,090,000 to an unnamed European collector.

The features of the original DB5, as featured in Goldfinger, included an ejection passenger seat, operated by a pushbutton concealed in the shift lever; a metal pop-up shield in the rear; rotating licence plates; an on-demand oil slick; rotating blades concealed in each wheel hub that could be extended to shred an enemy's tyres; and a tracking device, with a dash-mounted display, that predated the modern GPS tracker. Some features are referenced in later films, such as Skyfall, in which M (Judi Dench) says to Bond, "Oh, go on, then, eject me. See if I care."

Aircraft

Bond also shows his taste for aircraft: a gyrocopter—Little Nellie—features in You Only Live Twice, a Cessna 185 Seaplane in Licence to Kill, an Acrostar Jet in Octopussy, the titular Space Shuttle in Moonraker and an Aero L-39 Albatros in Tomorrow Never Dies.

=== Meeting allies ===
Once in the field, Bond frequently meets up with a local ally upon arrival. These can be his foreign counterparts like Tiger Tanaka in Japan or CIA operatives like Felix Leiter, or his own staff in a secret location. Such characters can also be female, some of whom succumb to Bond's charms. Often these allies will provide Bond either with information to complete his mission, or with additional gadgets from Q. Some allies recur through a number of instalments, such as the Western-friendly KGB chief, General Gogol, Sir Frederick Gray, the Minister of Defence and René Mathis.

==== Felix Leiter ====
One of Bond's closest allies in both the novels and films is CIA operative Felix Leiter. Fleming wrote twelve novels, of which Leiter appears in six; in the second book, Live and Let Die, Leiter was attacked by a shark and lost his right arm and half his left leg and his subsequent appearances were with prosthetics. For the film series the shark attack occurred in Licence to Kill, the fifteenth instalment in the series. Following Licence to Kill, Leiter did not appear until the reboot of the franchise with Casino Royale.

In total Leiter appears in nine Eon Bond films: four out of the six Connery films, one film with Moore, both Dalton instalments and none with Brosnan (where Bond's CIA contact is Jack Wade), but returned for Craig's; he is also not in George Lazenby's sole Bond film. In the Eon series, there were no Leiter film appearances between 1973 and 1987 and no Leiter appearances between 1989 and 2006.

Although other recurring characters in the Eon series, such as M, Q and Moneypenny, had continuity within the actors, the character of Leiter has not. In the nine Eon films in which Leiter makes an appearance, there have been seven actors playing the role. Only two actors have played the part twice: David Hedison and Jeffrey Wright. Wright's first appearances also made him the first African-American actor to play the part in the Eon series, although Leiter was also played by Afro-American actor Bernie Casey in one of the non-Eon films, Never Say Never Again.

=== Chase scenes ===
Whether on foot or by car or on cello case, Bond is generally involved in a chase sequence.

Keeping with the greater Hollywood tradition, every Bond film features chase scenes, usually more than one per film. Bond and his allies evade their pursuers in a wide variety of vehicles, including custom air- and watercraft, to trucks and even tanks and moon-buggies. Although most chase sequences feature Bond getting chased by the villains, such as the Aston-Martin DB5 in Goldfinger and the ski sequence in On Her Majesty's Secret Service, some feature Bond chasing the villains, such as the tank pursuit in GoldenEye and all sequences in Casino Royale. As the Eon series has progressed, the chases have repeated themselves with some variations and have all increased in extravagance.

Among the more unusual chase sequences include the gondola sequence from Moonraker, which leaves the canals of Venice to continue on land, and the cello case chase in The Living Daylights, as well as a double-decker bus in Live and Let Die.

== International locations ==
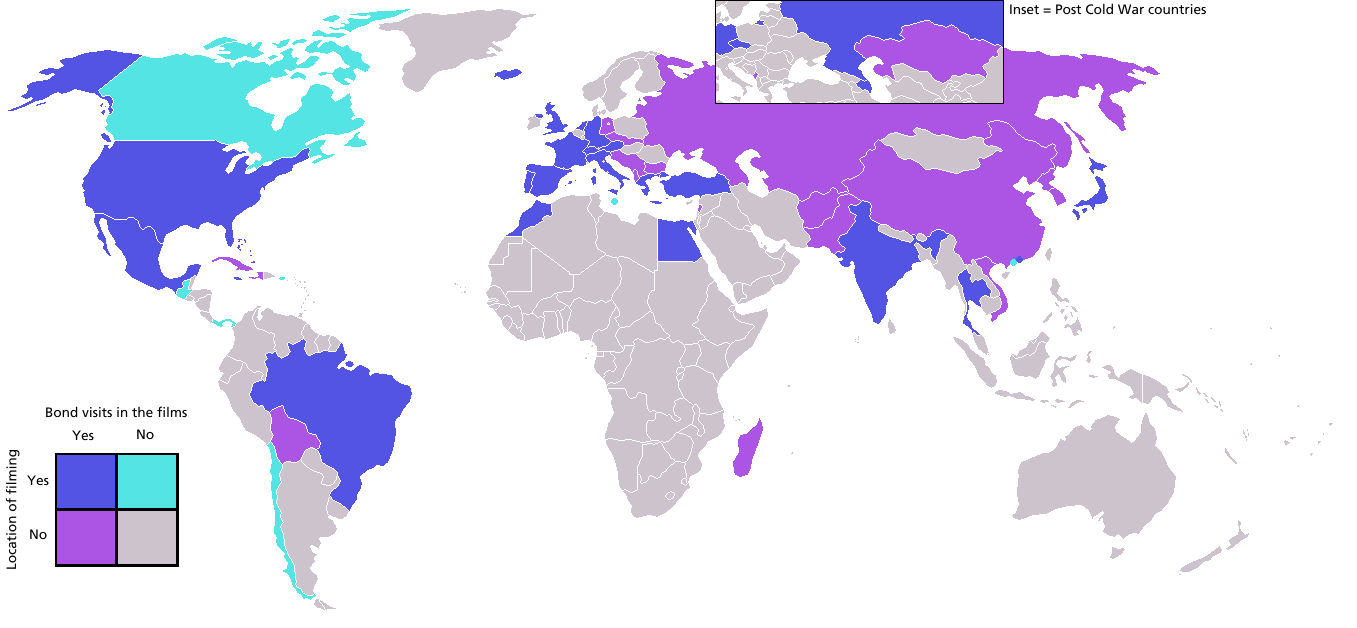
Countries James Bond has visited in the films

Bond's adventures have taken him to over sixty countries, as well as outer space, in locations mostly described as attractive and exotic. These locations are primarily real places, though on occasion—such as San Monique (Live and Let Die) and Isthmus (Licence to Kill)—the destinations have been fictional.

The locations used for filming have often altered because of the effects of Bond's presence: Scaramanga's hideout on Ko Tapu (Thai: เกาะตะปู) in The Man with the Golden Gun is often now referred to as James Bond Island both by locals and in tourist guidebooks. Similarly, the revolving restaurant, located atop the Schilthorn near the village of Mürren used in On Her Majesty's Secret Service has retained the name Piz Gloria since filming took place there.

Klaus Dodds has noted that there is a geopolitical aspect to the locations used, although this is often a pre-emption of an issue by the film. For example, in the first film, Dr. No, the title villain's disruption of the American Project Mercury space launch from Cape Canaveral with his atomic-powered radio beam mirrored claims that American rocket testing at Cape Canaveral had problems with rockets going astray. Similarly Bond's anti-heroin mission in Live and Let Die coincided with President Nixon's 1972 declaration of a war on drugs, whilst GoldenEye played against the backdrop of Ronald Reagan's Strategic Defense Initiative.

== Characters ==
=== Larger-than-life villains ===
For the series of Bond novels, Fleming realised that without threatening villains Bond seemed less heroic: this tradition of strong literary villain was brought across to the screen in the Eon series. The third Bond film, Goldfinger, set a pattern for having a main villain with a loyal and dangerous henchman, a model which was followed in subsequent films.

Whilst Bond scholar Glenn Yeffeth argues that there are only three Bond villains of note—Dr. No, Auric Goldfinger and Ernst Stavro Blofeld, fellow scholar Kerstin Jütting has identified a path of development of villains, all of whom adapt to a contemporary zeitgeist:

- Ernst Stavro Blofeld (1963–2021)—Model megalomaniac facing 007 eight times
- Francisco Scaramanga (1974)—the first "freelance" villain
- Aristotle Kristatos (1981)—the first false ally
- Franz Sanchez (1989)—the first villain with the already fulfilled operation
- Alec Trevelyan (1995)—the first MI6 villain
- Elliot Carver (1997)—the modern megalomaniac
- Elektra King (1999)—the first villainess
- Raoul Silva (2012)—the first attack on M

The list ignores the appearance of Rosa Klebb as first villainess already in 1963, portrayed by Lotte Lenya, who also is considered the first LGBT-Character of the series by some.

Many of Bond's adversaries are characterised by an unusual physical deformity; for example, Le Chiffre suffered haemolacria, causing his tear ducts to weep blood. Not all of the villains have unusual physical traits; Mathieu Amalric's Dominic Greene was depicted without such characteristics, instead being inspired by Tony Blair and Nicolas Sarkozy.

Many of the henchmen employed by the villains may have unique weapons; Oddjob, Auric Goldfinger's enforcer, carries a bowler hat with a razor-sharp blade concealed in the rim, while Xenia Onatopp is known to crush victims to death with her thighs during intercourse. In addition to these weapons, many of the henchmen are physically different; the over-large Tee Hee had an iron claw, Jaws, an assassin with steel teeth, was played by 2.18-metre (7 ft 2 in) actor Richard Kiel, whilst Renard (the henchman to the main villainess Elektra) survived being shot in the head, which progressively killed off his senses and his ability to feel pain.

Many of Bond's adversaries meet their deaths at the hands of Bond who often uses his environment or equipment to kill his opponent. Mr. Big was killed when Bond force-fed him a pellet of compressed gas, causing him to inflate and explode whilst Hugo Drax was ejected into outer space. Very few villains actually survive the course of Bond's assignment, and their deaths often come in the final scenes of the film. Lindner has noted that a number of the villains or henchmen have met their deaths through Bond using the technology of the villains against themselves and these include Alec Trevelyan being speared by part of the communications dish, Elliot Carver impaled by his sea-drill and Renard skewered by a nuclear fuel rod.

=== Bond girls ===
At some point on the mission, Bond meets the principal Bond girl, a character portraying Bond's love interest or one of his main sex objects. There is always one Bond girl central to the plot, and often one or two others who cross his path, helpful or not. They may be victims rescued by Bond, or else ally agents, villainesses, or henchwomen. Many partner with Bond on the assignment, while others such as Honey Ryder are solely passive participants in the mission. More generally, the degree to which Bond girls are pivotal to propelling the plot forward varies from one film to the next. Five of the Bond girls are "bad" girls (or at least working for the villain) who turn "good" (or switch sides) usually due to Bond's influence. Bond has fallen in love with only Tracy di Vicenzo in On Her Majesty's Secret Service, Vesper Lynd in Casino Royale, and Dr. Madeleine Swann in Spectre and No Time to Die. Both Tracy and Vesper die early in their relationships with Bond, and this reoccurring tragic outcome was used to create tension in No Time to Die regarding Swann's fate.

Roald Dahl, a screenwriter of You Only Live Twice, said he was given a formula to work to for the film: "you put in three girls ... Girl number one is pro-Bond. She stays around roughly through the first reel of the picture. Then she is bumped off by the enemy, preferably in Bond's arms." The next girl is anti-Bond and normally captures him, but Bond will save himself by using his charm and sexual potency: she is normally killed midway through the film. Girl number three will survive and end the film in Bond's embrace.

Academic Kimberly A. Neuendorf notes that James Bond promotes stereotypical, sex-typed male attitudes, especially when interacting with women and in doing so demonstrates Western society's patriarchal, individualistic culture. Academic Tricia Jenkins, meanwhile, sees that Bond as "hyperheterosexual", as he is "more masculine, more sexually desirable, more heterosexual than the others around him". Bond girls became a major theme in many Bond film posters, beginning with Dr. No; the suggestiveness of the images used had to be toned down in some countries.

Bond girls often have highly suggestive names, including Goldfinger's Pussy Galore, which the American censor refused to allow on promotional materials and for the US market she was subsequently referred to as "Miss Galore" or "Goldfinger's personal pilot"; however Honor Blackman took delight in embarrassing interviewers by repeatedly mentioning her character's name. Other double entendre names included Holly Goodhead from Moonraker, Mary Goodnight and Chew Mee from The Man with the Golden Gun, Honey Ryder from Dr. No, Plenty O'Toole from Diamonds Are Forever, Xenia Onatopp from GoldenEye, and Christmas Jones from The World Is Not Enough.

== Humour ==
One of the elements used throughout the Bond series is humour, particularly 'one-liners', delivered by Bond, either when killing an enemy, or at the end of the film when with a woman. The humour was present in the first film in the series, Dr. No, with Bond leaving a corpse in a car outside Government House and asking the Duty Sergeant to make sure he did not get away, whilst in Goldfinger, Bond electrocutes a man in a bath, before commenting, "Shocking, positively shocking".

During Sean Connery's Bond films, the humour was delivered by Connery to soften a violent situation, such as the electrification, or his shooting a villain with a spear gun and saying "I think he got the point". The humour changed towards innuendo and self-mockery during the Roger Moore films, with his jokes delivered with what media historian James Chapman considered to be a "wink at the audience", with the suggestion that the violence was all a joke. This was shown in Live and Let Die when he threw the villain, Tee Hee, out of a train, removing his prosthetic arm in the process, Moore commented that he was "Just being disarming, darling". When Timothy Dalton took the role, the humour was downplayed, bringing the character more in line with that of the novels. The humour returned for the Brosnan films, with Bond admitting between kisses that he "always enjoyed studying a new tongue". Similarly, Moneypenny called Bond a "cunning linguist" after she interrupted his lesson with his Danish-language teacher. Brosnan was not happy with some of the humour in the films, particularly the "stupid one-liners — which I loathed — and I always felt phony doing them".

The films often include a one-liner, often of a sexual nature, at the dénouement. At the close of The Spy Who Loved Me, Roger Moore's final line when caught with a woman, was that he was "Keeping the British end up, Sir!", something that Chapman considered to have "plumbed new depths of banality". Similarly, Moonraker closes with a distracted Q answering M's question of "What's he doing?" as they are watching a live broadcast of Bond having sex in space with "I think he's attempting re-entry, sir"; a line described by Barnes and Hearn as "sheer magnificence". Philosopher Rafael Holmberg suggested that the vulgarity of Bond's sexual innuendos contradicting with his stoic, gentlemanly position offers a way to understand Lacanian psychoanalysis.

The films also contain elements of visual humour: when Jaws is dropped into a shark pool in The Spy Who Loved Me, it is Jaws who bites the shark. The following film, Moonraker, sees Bond in a comic chase scene with a gondola that becomes a hovercraft, a continuation that Bond author Raymond Benson considered "so dumb that one wonders at what age group the film was really aimed". The music and sound effects are also used for comic effect in the films: the laboratory of Hugo Drax is opened by touchtones that play the tune of Close Encounters of the Third Kind, whilst when Bond and Anya are seen walking across the desert in The Spy Who Loved Me, the theme from Lawrence of Arabia is heard.

== Dénouement ==
=== Protracted attempt to kill Bond ===
In most of the films, the main villain often captures Bond and, rather than kill him quickly, attempts a slow and protracted death, from which Bond always escapes. This will often also come with a scene of the villain explaining his master plan to Bond. Goldfinger chained Bond to a nuclear bomb in the vault, while Alec Trevelyan tied an unconscious Bond to a helicopter that was programmed to fire its own missiles at itself. Francisco Scaramanga gave Bond lunch and then proposed a duel in his "fun room", while Hugo Drax trapped Bond beneath the exhaust of a rocket to burn to death. This convention within the Bond canon has been lampooned in spoof films, including the Austin Powers series (e.g "Begin the unnecessarily slow moving dipping mechanism").

=== Climax ===
The climax of most Bond films is the final confrontation with the villain and his henchmen, sometimes an entire army of cohorts, often in his hard-to-reach lair. The villain's retreat can be a private island (Dr. No, The Man with the Golden Gun), underwater (The Spy Who Loved Me), mountaintop retreat (On Her Majesty's Secret Service, For Your Eyes Only) volcano (You Only Live Twice), or underground base (Live and Let Die), a ship (Thunderball, Tomorrow Never Dies), an oil rig (Diamonds Are Forever) or even a space station (Moonraker)—among other variations. Bond usually sabotages the lair and, with time ticking down, dispatches the supervillain, rescues the principal Bond girl and they escape as the place blows up. In some cases, the villain or his primary henchman escapes to launch a final attack on Bond and his lover in the final scene.

=== Ending ===
The first twenty films of the Bond series, with the exception of On Her Majesty's Secret Service, end with Bond embracing, kissing, or making love with the film's Bond girl. Sometimes an embarrassed M catches Bond during these embraces. Most endings feature a double entendre and, in many of the films, the Bond girl purrs, "Oh, James." On Her Majesty's Secret Service subverts this motif by concluding with Bond's wife Tracy being killed immediately following their wedding. Other than Spectre, none of the Daniel Craig Bond films feature this traditional Bond girl ending. No Time to Die, the 25th film in the series, was the first to end with the death of James Bond.

Every Bond film from Thunderball through until Octopussy concludes with text reading "James Bond will return..." or "James Bond will be back" followed by the title of the next film to be produced. These were sometimes incorrect: The Spy Who Loved Me promised James Bond would return in For Your Eyes Only, but after the success of Star Wars, the producers decided to make Moonraker instead and For Your Eyes Only followed in 1981; similarly, the very first film to contain such a message ended with "The end of 'Goldfinger'," and "but James Bond will return in 'On Her Majesty's Secret Service'", which was replaced with the now-correct "but James Bond will be back in 'Thunderball'" for foreign releases. From A View to a Kill onward, these messages no longer included the title of the upcoming film. Despite the death of Daniel Craig's 007 in No Time to Die, the film still concludes with the declaration that "James Bond will return", confirming that the character will return with a new actor in the role.

== Quotations ==
Sean Connery introduces Bond to the cinematic world with "Bond, James Bond."

The first Bond film, Dr. No, included the introduction of the character of James Bond. Bond was introduced in an exchange near the beginning of the film with Sylvia Trench. It was Sean Connery's second line in the film. (Note: It is a misconception that this is Bond's introductory line, when in fact he has the following exchange with Sylvia Trench over a game of Chemin de Fer: James Bond: I admire your courage, Miss...? Sylvia Trench: Trench. Sylvia Trench. I admire your luck, Mr...? James Bond: Bond. James Bond.)

"Bond, James Bond"

— Bond to numerous people; first heard in Dr. No

Following the release of Dr. No, the quote "Bond ... James Bond", became a catch phrase that entered the lexicon of Western popular culture: writers Cork and Scivally said of the introduction in Dr. No that the "signature introduction would become the most famous and loved film line ever". In 2001 it was voted as the "best-loved one-liner in cinema" by British cinema goers. On 21 June 2005, the line was honoured as the 22nd historically greatest cinema quotation by the American Film Institute, in its 100 Years Series.

Not all the films contain the introduction, Quantum of Solace, for example and in others it is often mocked by others—in Thunderball, the villainous character Fiona Volpe mocks him by saying it to him while with Mr. Big in Live and Let Die interrupts Bond's introduction with: "Names is for tombstones, baby... waste him!" Likewise, in Goldfinger, Tilly Masterson cuts him off as he is offering his name by asking him to carry her luggage.

Bond's preferred drink is a vodka martini, which he asks to be "shaken, not stirred". This instruction quickly became another catchphrase. It was honoured by the AFI as the 90th most-memorable cinema quotation. In order to distance his version of Bond from Sean Connery's, Roger Moore did not order a martini. The martini was present in the first Ian Fleming novel, Casino Royale, where Bond eventually named it "The Vesper", after Vesper Lynd. The same recipe was then used for the 2006 film of the novel, with the martini ordered by Daniel Craig's Bond.

== See also ==
- James Bond music
- List of James Bond films
- Outline of James Bond
- Production of the James Bond films

== Bibliography ==
- Barber, Hoyt L.; Barber, Harry L. (1999). Book of Bond, James Bond. London: Atlantic Books. ISBN 978-1-890723-20-0.
- Barnes, Alan; Hearn, Marcus (2001). Kiss Kiss Bang! Bang!: the Unofficial James Bond Film Companion. Batsford Books. ISBN 978-0-7134-8182-2.
- Bennett, Tony; Woollacott, Janet (2009). "The Moments of Bond". In Lindner, Christoph (ed.). The James Bond Phenomenon: a Critical Reader. Manchester University Press. ISBN 978-0-7190-6541-5.
- Benson, Raymond (1988). The James Bond Bedside Companion. London: Boxtree Ltd. ISBN 978-1-85283-233-9.
- Black, Jeremy (2005). The Politics of James Bond: from Fleming's Novel to the Big Screen. University of Nebraska Press. ISBN 978-0-8032-6240-9. Archived from the original on 8 May 2021.
- Chancellor, Henry (2005). James Bond: The Man and His World. London: John Murray. ISBN 978-0-7195-6815-2.
- Chapman, James (2009). Licence to Thrill: A Cultural History of the James Bond Films. New York: I.B. Tauris. ISBN 978-1-84511-515-9.
- Comentale, Edward P; Watt, Stephen; Willman, Skip (2005). Ian Fleming & James Bond: the cultural politics of 007. Indiana University Press. ISBN 978-0-253-21743-1. Archived from the original on 9 October 2021.
- Cork, John; Scivally, Bruce (2002). James Bond: The Legacy. London: Boxtree. ISBN 978-0-7522-6498-1.
- Cork, John; Stutz, Collin (2007). James Bond Encyclopedia. London: Dorling Kindersley. ISBN 978-1-4053-3427-3.
- Feeney Callan, Michael (2002). Sean Connery. London: Virgin Books. ISBN 978-1-85227-992-9.
- Fleming, Ian (2006). Casino Royale. London: Penguin Books. ISBN 978-0-14-102830-9.
- Jütting, Kerstin (2007). "Grow Up, 007!" - James Bond Over the Decades: Formula Vs. Innovation. GRIN Verlag. ISBN 978-3-638-85372-9. Archived from the original on 9 October 2021.
- King, Emily; Fletcher, Alan (2005). Robert Brownjohn: Sex and Typography: 1925–1970 Life and Work. London: Laurence King. ISBN 978-1-85669-464-3.
- Lane, Andy; Simpson, Paul (2002). The Bond Files: The Unofficial Guide to the World's Greatest Secret Agent. Virgin Books. ISBN 978-0-7535-0712-4.
- Leach, Jim (2009). ""The world has changed":Bond in the 1990s—and beyond?". In Lindner, Christoph (ed.). The James Bond Phenomenon: a Critical Reader. Manchester: Manchester University Press. ISBN 978-0-7190-6541-5.
- Lindner, Christoph (2009). The James Bond Phenomenon: a Critical Reader. Manchester University Press. ISBN 978-0-7190-6541-5. Archived from the original on 21 May 2021.
- Lipp, Deborah (2006). The Ultimate James Bond Fan Book. New York: Sterling & Ross Publishers. ISBN 978-0-9766372-8-8.
- Lycett, Andrew (1996). Ian Fleming. London: Phoenix. ISBN 978-1-85799-783-5.
- Macintyre, Ben (2008). For Your Eyes Only. London: Bloomsbury Publishing. ISBN 978-0-7475-9527-4.
- Moore, Roger (2012). Bond on Bond. London: Michael O'Mara Books. ISBN 978-1-84317-861-3.
- Nourmand, Tony (2002). James Bond Movie Posters. San Francisco: Chronicle Books. ISBN 978-0-8118-3625-8.
- Packer, Jeremy (2009). Secret agents: popular icons beyond James Bond. Peter Lang. ISBN 978-0-8204-8669-7. Archived from the original on 7 November 2021.
- Pfeiffer, Lee; Worrall, Dave (1998). The Essential Bond. London: Boxtree Ltd. ISBN 978-0-7522-2477-0.
- Reynolds, Kev (2005). The Bernese Alps. Milnthorpe, Cumbria: Cicerone Press. ISBN 978-1-85284-451-6. Archived from the original on 7 November 2021.
- Rubin, Steven Jay (2003). The Complete James Bond Movie Encyclopedia. New York: McGraw-Hill. ISBN 978-0-07-141246-9.
- Simpson, Paul (2002). The Rough Guide to James Bond. Rough Guides. ISBN 978-1-84353-142-5. Archived from the original on 15 August 2021.
- Smith, Jim; Lavington, Stephen (2002). Bond Films. London: Virgin Books. ISBN 978-0-7535-0709-4.
- Stock, Paul (2009). "Dial 'M' for metonym: Universal Exports, M's office space and empire". In Lindner, Christoph (ed.). The James Bond Phenomenon: a Critical Reader. Manchester: Manchester University Press. ISBN 978-0-7190-6541-5.
- Yeffeth, Glenn, ed. (2006). James Bond in the 21st century: why we still need 007. Dallas, Texas: BenBella Books. ISBN 978-1-933771-02-1. Archived from the original on 25 January 2021.
