= Film title design =

Film company role or service

Film title design is the practice of creating motion picture title sequences and related on-screen credits. It originated in early cinema with static title cards used to identify films and present production information. During the twentieth century, title sequences developed into a specialized area of graphic and motion design, incorporating typography, illustration, film editing, and later digital techniques. In film studies, title sequences are often understood as paratextual works that frame the viewing experience by introducing themes, mood, and narrative expectations before the main film begins.

A title sequence designer is a graphic or motion designer responsible for the creation of a film’s opening title sequence and related credit design. Title sequence design is commonly associated with motion graphics and combines elements of graphic design, typography, animation, and film editing. Title sequences typically present animated visuals and kinetic typography while introducing the film’s credits and establishing tone and narrative context.

== History ==
Film title design developed from simple, static title cards in early cinema into a specialized discipline combining graphic design, typography, animation, editing, and motion graphics. Scholars generally describe its history as a progression from a purely informational function to an artistic and narrative one.

=== Early Cinema: Title Cards and Credits (1890s–1920s) ===
In the silent era, title sequences consisted primarily of static title cards that identified the film, studio, cast, and other production information. Before electronic and digital methods existed, these titles were drawn on paper, photographed, and manually incorporated into films. Designing title cards was often the responsibility of skilled artists working within film production companies.

=== Classical Hollywood and the Sound Era (1930s–1940s) ===
With the arrival of sound cinema, title sequences became more elaborate. Studios experimented with decorative typography, illustration, and themed artwork to create more engaging introductions. During this period, title sequences remained largely static but increasingly contributed to the audience's expectations of the film. Historical studies describe this era as one in which cultural, industrial, and technological factors shaped evolving title-design practices.

=== The Modernist Revolution: Saul Bass and the 1950s–1960s ===
The most influential turning point in film title design came with the work of Saul Bass. Although earlier title sequences could be highly inventive, Bass helped transform title design into a recognized artistic and graphic-design discipline. His work for films such as The Man with the Golden Arm, Vertigo, North by Northwest, and Psycho integrated typography, animation, symbolism, and narrative themes into unified visual statements.

=== Motion Graphics and Specialized Title Design (1970s–1990s) ===
Following Bass's influence, title design emerged as a specialized profession. Designers such as Maurice Binder, Dan Perri, and later Kyle Cooper expanded the use of animation, cinematography, visual effects, and kinetic typography. Dedicated studios specializing in title design became increasingly common. By this period, title sequences were frequently conceived as independent design works that could contribute significantly to a film's identity and marketing.

=== Digital Era and the Twenty-First Century ===
The adoption of digital production tools transformed title design. Computer animation, compositing, and motion graphics expanded the range of visual techniques available to designers. At the same time, Deborah Allison notes that a major trend in the twenty-first century has been the relocation of many credits to the end of films, resulting in shorter and often more minimalist opening title sequences.
