= Peter Lamont =

British art director (1929–2020)

- Born: Peter Curtis Lamont; 12 November 1929; London, England
- Died: 18 December 2020 (aged 91); Slough, England
- Occupations: Art decorator; set decorator; production designer
- Years active: 1950–2006
- Spouse: Ann Aldridge (m. 1952; died 2013)
- Children: 2

Signature
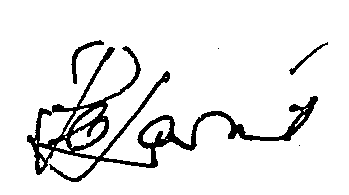

Peter Curtis Lamont (12 November 1929 – 18 December 2020) was a British set decorator, art director, and production designer most noted for his collaborations with filmmaker James Cameron, and for working on eighteen James Bond films, from Goldfinger (1964) to Casino Royale (2006). The only Bond film that he did not work on during that period was Tomorrow Never Dies (1997), as he was working on Cameron's Titanic (1997) at the time. He also worked extensively as a set dresser on the Carry On series in the 1960s.

== Background ==
Lamont was born in London on 12 November 1929, and was raised at Denham, Buckinghamshire. His father and uncle were signwriters, and his father often worked on film productions. Lamont was educated at High Wycombe Technical Institute.

In 1947, Lamont was hired as an assistant to Edward Carrick. He completed his national service with the Royal Air Force, and upon his return in 1950, was hired by Pinewood Studios.

Throughout his near 60-year career, Lamont was nominated for four Academy Awards for his work on Fiddler on the Roof (1971), The Spy Who Loved Me (1977), Aliens (1986), and Titanic (1997), winning for the latter film. His memoir, The Man With the Golden Eye: Designing the James Bond Films, was published in 2016. His last credit was Casino Royale (2006); though he had initially planned to work on the next Bond film, Quantum of Solace, he felt that his age and long affiliation with the franchise would make him incompatible with the director, Marc Forster. Due to these concerns, as well as the death of his brother around this time, he decided to retire from the film industry.

=== Personal life and death ===
In 1952, Lamont married Ann Aldridge; they had two children and were married until her death in 2013. He died from pneumonia and lung disease at Wexham Park Hospital on 18 December 2020, aged 91.

== Credits ==
=== James Bond series ===
==== Draftsman ====
- Goldfinger (1964) (uncredited)

==== Set decorator ====
- Thunderball (1965) (uncredited)
- You Only Live Twice (1967)
- On Her Majesty's Secret Service (1969)
- Diamonds Are Forever (1971)

==== Art director ====
- Live and Let Die (1973)
- The Man with the Golden Gun (1974)
- The Spy Who Loved Me (1977)
- Moonraker (1979) — Visual effects

=== Production designer ===
==== James Bond 007 ====
- For Your Eyes Only (1981)
- Octopussy (1983)
- A View to a Kill (1985)
- The Living Daylights (1987)
- Licence to Kill (1989)
- GoldenEye (1995)
- The World Is Not Enough (1999)
- Die Another Day (2002)
- Casino Royale (2006)

==== Works with James Cameron ====
- Aliens (1986)
- True Lies (1994)
- Titanic (1997)

=== Selected other filmography ===
- Chitty Chitty Bang Bang (1968) — Assistant set director
- Fiddler on the Roof (1971) — Set decorator
- Eve of Destruction (1991) — Production designer
- Wing Commander (1999) — Production designer
