= Peter Murton =

British film designer (1924–2009)

Peter William Murton (24 September 1924 – 15 December 2009) was a film art director and production designer.

His father Walter W. Murton was also an art director and production designer. His son Simon Murton is also an art director.

== Career ==
Murton worked as an art director for production designer Ken Adam on the Stanley Kubrick film Dr. Strangelove. Murton then did art direction on the next two James Bond films - Goldfinger and Thunderball - for which Adam also did the production design. Murton was promoted to production designer on the 1974 Bond film The Man with the Golden Gun. The production team chose Thailand as a primary location, following Murton's suggestion, after he saw pictures of the Phuket bay in a magazine. Bond film historian Steven Jay Rubin faults The Man with the Golden Gun for not making good use of Murton's sets, especially the solar energy room. "Murton's interiors were well up to the standards expected on a Bond film." Rubin believes that the responsibility for the film's artistic failure "lay elsewhere." Murton wrote an article discussing Bond film gimmicks.

Murton worked with producer Harry Saltzman on six films: three Bond films, the first two Harry Palmer films, and Saltzman's unmade pet project The Micronauts.

On King Kong Lives Murton had to create forty miniature sets, which proved a challenge. Never in his career had he to create so many miniatures at once. Further, few of the art department crew had any experience making models.

== Filmography ==
=== Art director ===
- Mr. Topaze (1961)
- Billy Budd (1962)
- Dr. Strangelove or: How I Learned to Stop Worrying and Love the Bomb (1964)
- Woman of Straw (1964)
- Goldfinger (1964)
- The Ipcress File (1965)
- Thunderball (1965)
- Funeral in Berlin (1966)
- Half a Sixpence (1967)
- The Lion in Winter (1968)
- Three Into Two Won't Go (1969)
- Night Watch (1973)
- The Black Windmill (1974)
- Ike (TV mini-series) (1979)
- Stargate (1994)

=== Production designer ===
- The Ruling Class (1972)
- The Possession of Joel Delaney (1972)
- The Man with the Golden Gun (1974)
- Man Friday (1975)
- The Eagle Has Landed (1976)
- Death on the Nile (1978)
- Dracula (1979)
- Superman II (1980) (Richard Lester directed scenes only)
- Superman III (1983)
- Sheena: Queen of the Jungle (1984)
- The Chain (1984)
- Spies Like Us (1985)
- King Kong Lives (1986)
- Just Ask for Diamond (1988)
- Blind Fury (1989)
- Popcorn (1991)
- Genghis Khan (1992)
- From Time to Time (short) (1992)

== Bibliography ==
- Morton, Ray (2005). King Kong: The History of a Movie Icon from Fay Wray to Peter Jackson. Hal Leonard Corporation (Applause Bks). ISBN 9781557836694.
- Rubin, Steven Jay (1981). The James Bond films: A Behind the Scenes History. Arlington House. ISBN 978-0-87000-523-7.
