= MK12 =

Graphic design company

MK12 is a graphic design company best known for creating the title sequences for the films of Marc Forster, such as Stranger than Fiction (2006) and Quantum of Solace (2008), as well as the interstitial videos in the 2009 rhythm game The Beatles: Rock Band. The company was founded in 2000 by Timmy Fisher, Ben Radatz, Matt Fraction, Shaun Hamontree, Chad Perry and Jed Carter, who met at the Kansas City Art Institute.
