= Maurice Binder =

American film title designer (1925–1991)

- Born: December 4, 1925; New York City, U.S.
- Died: April 9, 1991 (aged 65); London, England
- Occupation: Film title designer
- Known for: Work on 16 James Bond films, including the first, Dr. No (1962), and for Stanley Donen's films from 1958

Maurice Binder (December 4, 1925 – April 9, 1991) was an American film title designer best known for his work on 16 James Bond films, including the first, Dr. No (1962), and for Stanley Donen's films from 1958.

== Early work ==
Binder was born in New York City, but he mostly worked in Britain from the 1950s. In 1951, Binder directed two short films in the obscure Meet Mister Baby series; these films were preserved by the Academy Film Archive in 2015. He created his first film-title design for Stanley Donen's Indiscreet (1958). The James Bond producers first approached him after being impressed by his title designs for the Donen comedy film The Grass Is Greener (1960). Binder also provided sequences for Donen for Charade (1963) and Arabesque (1966), both accompanying music by Henry Mancini.

== James Bond ==
Binder created the signature gun-barrel sequence for the opening titles of the first Bond film, Dr. No (1962). Binder originally planned to employ a camera sighted down the barrel of a .38-calibre gun, but this caused some problems. Unable to fit the lens of a standard camera far enough down the barrel to bring the entire gun barrel into focus, his assistant Trevor Bond created a pinhole camera to solve the problem, and the barrel became clear.

Binder described the genesis of the gun-barrel sequence in his last interview in 1991:

That was something I did in a hurry, because I had to get to a meeting with the producers in twenty minutes. I just happened to have little white, price tag stickers and I thought I'd use them as gun shots across the screen. We'd have James Bond walk through and fire, at which point blood comes down onscreen. That was about a twenty-minute storyboard I did, and they said, "This looks great!"

At least one critic has also observed that the sequence recalls the gun fired at the audience at the end of The Great Train Robbery (1903). Binder is also known for featuring women dancing, jumping on trampolines and shooting weapons in his title sequences.

Binder was succeeded by Daniel Kleinman as the title designer for GoldenEye (1995). Prior to GoldenEye, the only James Bond films for which Binder did not create the opening title credits were From Russia with Love (1963) and Goldfinger (1964), both of which were designed by Robert Brownjohn.

== Other sequences ==
Binder shot opening and closing sequences involving a mouse (an animal that did not appear in either the novel or the film) for The Mouse That Roared (1959), a sequence of monks filmed as a mosaic explaining the history of the golden bell in The Long Ships (1963) and a sequence of Spanish dancers in The Day the Fish Came Out (1967).

He designed the title sequence for Sodom and Gomorrah (1963) that featured an orgy. The sequence, originally planned to take one day, spanned three days of work.

Binder also was a producer of The Passage (1979) and a visual consultant on Dracula (1979) and Oxford Blues (1984).

== Death ==
Binder died from lung cancer in London in 1991 at the age of 65.

== Filmography ==
=== James Bond ===
- Dr. No (1962)
- From Russia with Love – gun barrel sequence only (reused from Dr. No) (1963)
- Goldfinger – gun barrel sequence only (reused from Dr. No) (1964)
- Thunderball (1965)
- You Only Live Twice (1967)
- On Her Majesty's Secret Service (1969)
- Diamonds Are Forever (1971)
- Live and Let Die (1973)
- The Man with the Golden Gun (1974)
- The Spy Who Loved Me (1977)
- Moonraker (1979)
- For Your Eyes Only (1981)
- Octopussy (1983)
- A View to a Kill (1985)
- The Living Daylights (1987)
- Licence to Kill (1989)

=== Selected other films ===
- Indiscreet (1958)
- The Mouse That Roared (1959)
- Once More, with Feeling! (1960)
- Purple Noon (1960)
- The Grass Is Greener (1960)
- Road to Hong Kong (1962)
- Reach for Glory (1962)
- Charade (1963)
- Call Me Bwana (1963)
- The Running Man (1963)
- The Mouse on the Moon (1963)
- The Long Ships (1963)
- The 7th Dawn (1964)
- The Chase (1966)
- Caccia alla volpe (After the Fox) (1966)
- Arabesque (1966)
- Kaleidoscope (1966)
- Bedazzled (1967)
- Fathom (1967)
- Billion Dollar Brain (1967)
- Two for the Road (1967)
- Barbarella (1968)
- Battle of Britain (1969)
- The Private Life of Sherlock Holmes (1970)
- Young Winston (1972)
- Gold (1974)
- The Tamarind Seed (1974)
- Shout at the Devil (1976)
- The Wild Geese (1978)
- Dracula (1979)
- The Sea Wolves (1980)
- The Final Countdown (1980)
- Green Ice (1981)
- Max mon amour (1986)
- The Last Emperor (1987)
- The Sheltering Sky (1990)
