= Call Me Bwana =

1963 film by Gordon Douglas

- Theatrical release poster
- Directed by: Gordon Douglas
- Written by: Johanna Harwood; Nate Monaster
- Produced by: Albert R. Broccoli
- Starring: Bob Hope; Anita Ekberg; Edie Adams; Arnold Palmer
- Cinematography: Ted Moore
- Edited by: Peter R. Hunt
- Music by: Monty Norman
- Production company: Eon Productions
- Distributed by: Rank Film Distributors
- Release date: 4 April 1963 (UK)
- Running time: 102 minutes
- Country: United Kingdom
- Language: English
- Box office: $2.2 million

Call Me Bwana is a 1963 British Technicolor farce film starring Bob Hope and Anita Ekberg and directed by Gordon Douglas.

Largely set in Africa, it was the only film made by Eon Productions not about the fictional MI6 agent James Bond until the 2014 film The Silent Storm. It was made by most of the same crew as Dr. No.

== Plot ==
Bob Hope plays Matt Merriwether, a New York writer who has passed off his uncle's memoirs of explorations in Africa as his own. Merriwether lives his false reputation as a great white hunter to the point of living in a Manhattan apartment furnished to look like an African safari lodge complete with sound effects records of African fauna. Based on his false reputation as an "Africa Expert", he is recruited by the United States Government and NASA to locate a missing secret space probe before it can be located by hostile forces.

Hope's co-stars include Edie Adams and Anita Ekberg playing secret agents. Golfer Arnold Palmer also makes a brief cameo, playing a crazy round of golf with Hope—a scene revisited in the film Spies Like Us where Hope makes a cameo appearance and plays golf through a tent. A scene involving an unseen President John F. Kennedy in his famous rocking chair is parodied with his Russian counterpart Nikita Khrushchev rocking in a chair that squeaks loudly.

== Cast ==
- Bob Hope as Matt Merriwether
- Anita Ekberg as Luba (Anita Ekberg's spoken dialogue was dubbed by voice actress Nikki van der Zyl)
- Edie Adams as Frederica
- Lionel Jeffries as Ezra Mungo
- Arnold Palmer as himself
- Orlando Martins as Tribal chief
- Percy Herbert as First Henchman
- Paul Carpenter as Col. Spencer
- Al Mulock as Second Henchman
- Bari Jonson as Uta
- Peter Dyneley as Williams
- Mai Ling as Hyacinth
- Mark Heath as Koba
- Robert Nichols as American Major
- Neville Monroe as Reporter
- Mike Moyer as Reporter

== Production ==
According to Albert R. Broccoli's autobiography When the Snow Melts, Eon Productions was originally contracted by United Artists to make two films a year for them: one James Bond film and one non-Bond film. Many original suggestions were meant to showcase Sean Connery, who turned them all down, as he did not want his career totally in the hands of Eon.

When asked by journalist and close Broccoli affiliate Donald Zec if they had any ideas for their non-Bond film, Harry Saltzman, who had previously made The Iron Petticoat with Hope, suggested a Bob Hope movie. Zec replied that he had seen a British rock and roll group called The Beatles that had sellout crowds and thought about featuring them in a film. Saltzman laughed and asked why he would want to make a film about four young long-haired kids from Liverpool when he had Bob Hope. United Artists made the Beatles film with Walter Shenson and A Hard Day's Night was more successful than Call Me Bwana.

The film was originally intended to be shot entirely on location in Kenya but the problems of the Mau Mau Uprising led the producers to only have second unit cinematography led by John Coquillon.

Edie Adams thought that she was actually going to Africa and had painful inoculations. She remembered that the film seemed to be written as it went along; initially her character was a nuclear scientist, then a big-game hunter. One day on the set, she met a stuntwoman dressed like her character, throwing a male stuntman in a jiu jitsu throw; Adams realised that now her character was a secret agent. Adams' original role was given to Anita Ekberg, but as Hope had promised Adams a role, the script was rewritten to add a new female character.

In fact, the film was indeed being written during shooting. In October 1962, after being in production for two weeks, producer Broccoli hired novelist Paul Jarrico to do a "fast rewrite." Six writers had already worked on the script, "hundreds of jokes had been written about a bumbling explorer and a CIA agent searching for a U.S. space capsule in Africa, but no filmable story had emerged." Jarrico believed the script needed logic. Broccoli subsequently paid Jarrico $2,500 for four weeks' uncredited work.

Production director Syd Cain recalled that originally wild African animals from British zoos were to be released onto the golf course sequence but the idea was shelved when they caused expensive damage.

Spoofing a scene from Dr. No, Hope's character is asleep in a tent when a tarantula begins crawling up his leg. A similar thing had happened to James Bond in the first 007 film, played seriously, rather than for laughs.

Call Me Bwana is "plugged" in Eon Productions' 1963 Bond film From Russia with Love during a sequence where Ali Kerim Bey assassinates the Russian agent Krilencu with a sniper rifle. Krilencu attempts to escape through a window, which is situated in Anita Ekberg's mouth, on the wall-sized poster: "She should have kept her mouth shut," Bond says. In the original novel by Ian Fleming, published in 1957, the scene happens in a trapdoor situated in Marilyn Monroe's mouth on a poster for Niagara. Production of From Russia with Love actually began three days prior to the UK release of Call Me Bwana.

The next non-Bond Eon Productions release would not be until the 2014 film The Silent Storm, followed by Film Stars Don't Die in Liverpool in 2017.

== Soundtrack ==
The film was scored by Monty Norman, then contracted by Eon Productions.

John Barry claimed that Norman contacted him to orchestrate his theme The Big Safari, but the film's orchestration was eventually credited to Muir Mathieson. Barry released a recording of The Big Safari as well as another United Artists comedy The Mouse on the Moon under a pseudonym of "The Countdowns".

Bob Hope sang the title song over the end credits arranged by Johnnie Spence.

== Home media ==
Call Me Bwana was released to VHS by MGM/UA Home Video on 2 March 1993, which was available exclusively through Warner Home Video worldwide and was also released to DVD by 20th Century Fox Home Entertainment on 27 June 2011 via MGM Limited Edition Collection as a MOD (manufacture-on-demand) widescreen Region 1 DVD.
