= Johanna Harwood =

Irish screenwriter (born 1930)

- Born: 1930 (age 95–96); County Wicklow, Ireland
- Other names: J. M. Harwood
- Citizenship: Ireland
- Occupation: Screenwriter
- Years active: 1949–2000
- Spouse: René Clément (1986-1996)

Johanna Harwood (born 1930), sometimes billed as J. M. Harwood, is a retired Irish screenwriter. She is best known for co-writing the screenplays for the first three James Bond films; Dr. No (1962) and From Russia With Love (1963), and Goldfinger (1964), though she was uncredited for the latter. She was married to director René Clément.

== Life and career ==
Harwood entered the film industry in 1949. Fluent in the French language, she trained at Institut des hautes études cinématographiques ("I.D.H.E.C") in Paris, France.

According to the Irish Digest, Harwood also studied filmmaking in England, then returned to Dublin to work in the Irish film industry. She became a continuity supervisor on films during the early to mid-1950s including Everybody's Business (a.k.a. Gno Gach Einne); (Note: Credited as Siobhan Harwood.) Return to Glennascaul (shot in Ireland), starring Orson Welles; (Note: The film misspells her name as "Johanna Horward".) The Flying Eye; Knave of Hearts (shot in London and France); and Orson Welles's Mr. Arkadin. (Note: The film misspells her name as "Johanna Horward".) She also did assistant continuity on the Albert R. Broccoli productions The Red Beret and Hell Below Zero.

In an interview with Irish Digest magazine, Harwood claims that the shortage of Irish film work reluctantly forced her to move to London where she worked for a talent agent. This, at least, gave her sufficient time to write. Among the publications she contributed to during the late 1950s and early 1960s was Punch.

At some point, the agency closed its London office and Harry Saltzman took over. Harwood stayed on as his secretary and eventually his reader in the late 1950s. She eventually persuaded him to let her write a film script. Saltzman phoned her one night with an idea for a Bob Hope film and asked her to develop it into an outline. Writing as "J. M. Harwood", she wrote a spoof 1959 James Bond short story called Some Are Born Great.

Between 1960 and 1961 Harwood and Saltzman adapted the play The Marriage Game - originally by Mel Tolkin and Lucille Kallen - a comedy about "six girls in search of husbands." The play opened at the Kings Theatre, Southsea, on 25 September 1961. According to Plays and Players, the comedy was scheduled to visit Liverpool, Eastbourne and Brighton "before coming into the West End." Anthony Sharp directed with sets by Disley Jones. Broccoli and Saltzman subsequently hired Terry Southern to write the script which was never filmed.

According to the 1960 British Film and Television Yearbook, she wrote two unfilmed screenplays for Harry Saltzman's Woodfall Film Productions: City of Spades based on the 1957 Colin MacInnes novel to have been directed initially by Tony Richardson, (Note: Gavin Lambert re-wrote the script.) then by Peter Yates; (Note: Barry Reckord did a new re-write.) and Articles of War; of this script, Harry Saltzman said that it "is a war story with a tremendously different twist. I don't think that there has ever been a war story like this. It has no message and it isn't a documentary - it's pure entertainment."

Saltzman subsequently had her work on the first two James Bond films Dr. No and From Russia with Love, and the non-Bond Saltzman co-production Call Me Bwana.

Bond co-producer Albert R. Broccoli had originally hired Richard Maibaum and his friend Wolf Mankowitz to write the Dr. No screenplay. An initial draft of the screenplay was rejected because the scriptwriters had made the villain, Dr. No, a monkey. Mankowitz left the movie, and Maibaum then undertook a second version, more closely in line with the novel. Mankowitz eventually had his name removed from the credits after viewing early rushes, as he feared it would be a disaster. Johanna Harwood and thriller writer Berkely Mather then worked on Maibaum's script. The film's director Terence Young described Harwood as a script doctor who helped put elements more in tune with a British character.

Richard Maibaum felt "put out" that Harwood got an adaptation credit on From Russia with Love which he thought she did not deserve. Maibaum conceded that she worked "some with the director, Terence Young, and made several good suggestions." He claimed her adaptation credit was due to "studio politics".

Harwood stated in an interview in a Cinema Retro special on the making of the film that she had been a screenwriter of several of Harry Saltzman's projects, and noted both her screenplays for Dr. No and her screenplay for From Russia with Love had followed Fleming's novels closely.

Harwood also made uncredited contributions to the screenplay of Saltzman's The Ipcress File (1965).

== Other work ==
Harwood told the Irish Digest magazine in 1966 that she hoped to direct a film soon. "That's really what I want more than anything."

Harwood co-wrote the French film Ne jouez pas avec les Martiens (1967). She also translated into English three novels by French author Nicole Vidal: The Goddess Queen (1961), Nefertiti (1965) and Ring of Jade (1969). Harwood spent the next 20 years working for the Reader's Digest in Paris condensing French novels.

Harwood was married to the French film director René Clément whom she met on the set of Knave of Hearts (a.k.a. Monsieur Ripois). In 2007 she created the Fondation René Clement to commemorate her husband who died in 1996.

== Filmography ==
=== As writer only ===
- Dr. No (1962)
- Call Me Bwana (1963)
- From Russia with Love (1963)
- Ne jouez pas avec les Martiens (1967)

=== As herself ===
- Orson Welles in the Land of Don Quixote (2000)

== Bibliography ==
- Broccoli, Albert R. (1998). When the Snow Melts. London: Boxtree. ISBN 978-0-7522-1162-6.
- Helfenstein, Charles (2009). The Making of On Her Majesty's Secret Service. Frederick: Spies Publishing. ISBN 978-0-9844126-0-0.
- Hill, Lee (2010). A Grand Guy: The Art And Life of Terry Southern. HarperCollins. ISBN 978-0380977864.
- McGilligan, Patrick (1986). Backstory: Interviews with Screenwriters of Hollywood's Golden Age. University of California Press. ISBN 978-0-520-05689-3.
- Rockett, Kevin (1996). The Irish Filmography: Fiction Films, 1896-1996. Red Mountain Media. ISBN 9780952669807.
- Southern, Nile (2004). The Candy Men: The Rollicking Life and Times of the Notorious Novel Candy. Arcade Publishing. ISBN 155970604X.
- Williams, Melanie (2020). "Her Word Was Her Bond: Johanna Harwood, Bond's First Woman Screenwriter". In Gerrard, Steven (ed.). From Blofeld to Moneypenny: Gender in James Bond. Emerald Publishing. ISBN 978-1-83867-163-1.
