= The Silent Storm =

- Theatrical release poster
- Directed by: Corinna McFarlane
- Written by: Corinna McFarlane
- Produced by: Nicky Bentham
- Starring: Andrea Riseborough; Damian Lewis
- Cinematography: Ed Rutherford
- Edited by: Kate Baird
- Music by: Alastair Caplin
- Production companies: Neon Films; Cacti Films; Red & Black Films; British Film Company; Corniche Media; Eon Productions; Reel Roots
- Distributed by: Sony Pictures Releasing International
- Release dates: 14 October 2014 (London Film Festival); 20 May 2016 (United Kingdom)
- Running time: 102 minutes
- Country: United Kingdom
- Language: English
- Box office: $5,260

The Silent Storm is a 2014 British romantic drama film written and directed by Corinna McFarlane and starring Andrea Riseborough and Damian Lewis. It is the first non-James Bond film to be produced by Eon Productions, since Call Me Bwana.

== Cast ==
- Andrea Riseborough as Aislin
- Damian Lewis as Balor
- Ross Anderson as Fionn
- Kate Dickie as Mrs McKinnon
- John Sessions as Mr Smith
- Eric Robertson as Mr Stewart

== Release ==
The film premiered at the 2014 London Film Festival and was released in the United Kingdom on 20 May 2016.

== Reception ==
The film has a 28% rating on Rotten Tomatoes. Anna Smith of Empire awarded the film four stars. Tara Brady of The Irish Times awarded the film two stars out of five. Cath Clarke of Time Out also awarded the film two stars out of five. Trevor Johnston of Radio Times also awarded the film two stars out of five.
