= Mitchell Hooks =

American artist and illustrator

Peggy Mann's first novel, A Room in Paris (Doubleday, 1955) was adapted for The Philco Television Playhouse (August 7, 1955), and a few months later, the Popular Library paperback featured this cover by Mitchell Hooks.

Mitchell Hilary Hooks (April 2, 1923 – March 18, 2013) was an American artist and illustrator known for his artwork for paperback books and magazines.

== Biography ==
Hooks was born in Detroit, Michigan to Hilary M. and Marie (nee Andrews) Hooks. He attended Cass Technical High School and later joined the United States Army as an infantryman in 1944, where he deployed to Germany after World War II for occupation duty. He became a second lieutenant during the war, after which he began his freelance illustration career in New York City.

He painted paperback covers for Avon, Bantam Books, Dell Books, Fawcett Publications and others, and illustrated for magazines including Cosmopolitan, The Saturday Evening Post, The Ladies' Home Journal, Redbook, McCall's, and Woman's Day. He illustrated romance novels, science fiction and crime fiction, such as Ross Macdonald's Lew Archer, Peter Corris's Cliff Hardy and B.B. Johnston's Superspade series.

Hooks illustrated the 36-page booklet How to Respect and Display Our Flag for the U.S. Marine Corps. He also designed film posters, including the first James Bond movie, Dr. No — for which he painted "the iconic image of Sean Connery as Bond" — and The Face of Fu Manchu.

In later years he also illustrated hardcover books for The Franklin Library, Reader's Digest Books and Coronado Publishers, and did advertising art.

Hooks was 89 when he died.

== Awards ==
In 1999, he was inducted into the Society of Illustrators Hall of Fame.
