= Syd Cain =

- Born: Sydney Basil Cain; 16 April 1918; Grantham, Lincolnshire, United Kingdom
- Died: 21 November 2011 (aged 93); London, England, United Kingdom
- Occupation: Production designer
- Years active: 1958–1995

Sydney B. Cain (16 April 1918 – 21 November 2011) was a highly respected British production designer who worked on more than 30 films, including four in the James Bond series in the 1960s and 1970s.

== Biography ==
Cain was born in Grantham, Lincolnshire. After enlisting in the Royal Air Force, he survived a plane crash in Rhodesia during World War II, which broke his back, and also later survived being struck by lightning.

He entered the world of film after the war as a draughtsman. He worked his way up to being an assistant art director with Albert R. Broccoli's and Irving Allen's Warwick Films beginning with Cockleshell Heroes. He became one of Warwick's stock company working on several of Warwick's films including location work on Fire Down Below. He became a full-fledged art director after an injury to the planned art director just prior to the filming of Stanley Kubrick's Lolita (1962). After work on the final installment in the Road to ... series, Road to Hong Kong, Cain rejoined Broccoli's Eon Productions.

Cain's name was accidentally missed off the titles for Dr No, and the producer Cubby Broccoli instead gave him a solid gold pen as it would have cost too much to re-create the titles. For From Russia with Love, Cain designed a $150,000 set for a chess match which repeated the "chess pawn" motif throughout the room. He worked on a number of James Bond movies creating numerous gadgets.

Cain's name appears in documents in several films on which he worked. In Our Man in Havana where he was assistant art director his name features on the blueprints of a vacuum cleaner. Alfred Hitchcock's Frenzy features an in-joke of a racing form featuring the horse Jon Finch is to bet on is owned by a "Mrs S. Cain".

Cain was married three times and had eight children, three have excelled in the design industry; Maurice Cain as production designer in film and TV, Anthony Cain in illustration, and Leigh Cain in exhibition design.

In 2002 Cain wrote his autobiography "Not Forgetting James Bond" in which he lay down memories of working with hundreds of film directors, actors and crew, and also his interesting sporting family history. His father Tom Cain was an all-round athlete who played professional football for Queens Park Rangers and Tottenham Hotspur, and encouraged Fred Perry to switch from playing football to tennis and actually coached him for a while.

In his later years Cain resided at The Charterhouse in London. He died in the nearby University College Hospital on 21 November 2011, aged 93.

== Selected filmography ==
- The Inn of the Sixth Happiness (1958)
- Our Man in Havana (1959)
- Lolita (1962)
- Road to Hong Kong (1962)
- Dr. No (1962 – uncredited Art Director on Jamaica locations)
- Call Me Bwana (1963)
- Summer Holiday (1963)
- From Russia with Love (1963)
- Hot Enough for June (1964)
- The Amorous Adventures of Moll Flanders (1965)
- Fahrenheit 451 (1966)
- A Funny Thing Happened on the Way to the Forum (1966)
- Billion Dollar Brain (1967)
- On Her Majesty's Secret Service (1969)
- Frenzy (1972)
- Fear Is the Key (1972)
- Live and Let Die (1973)
- Aces High (1976)
- Shout at the Devil (1976)
- The Wild Geese (1978)
- The Sea Wolves (1980)
- The Final Option (1982)
- Wild Geese II (1985)
- Who Framed Roger Rabbit (1988) (storyboard artist)
- Tusks (1988)
- Alien 3 (1992)
- The Muppet Christmas Carol (1992)(storyboard artist)
- GoldenEye (1995) (storyboard artist)
