= Dr. No (film) =

1962 James Bond film directed by Terence Young

- British theatrical release poster by Mitchell Hooks
- Directed by: Terence Young
- Screenplay by: Richard Maibaum; Johanna Harwood; Berkely Mather
- Based on: Dr. No by Ian Fleming
- Produced by: Harry Saltzman; Albert R. Broccoli
- Starring: Sean Connery; Ursula Andress; Joseph Wiseman; Jack Lord; Anthony Dawson; Zena Marshall; John Kitzmiller; Eunice Gayson; Bernard Lee
- Cinematography: Ted Moore
- Edited by: Peter Hunt
- Music by: Monty Norman
- Production company: Eon Productions Limited
- Distributed by: United Artists
- Release date: 5 October 1962 (United Kingdom)
- Running time: 110 minutes
- Countries: United Kingdom; United States
- Language: English
- Budget: $1.1 million (£392,022)
- Box office: $59.5 million

Dr. No is a 1962 spy film and the first film in the James Bond series, starring Sean Connery as the fictional MI6 agent James Bond. Co-starring Ursula Andress, Joseph Wiseman and Jack Lord, it was directed by Terence Young and adapted by Richard Maibaum, Johanna Harwood, and Berkely Mather from the 1958 novel by Ian Fleming. The film was produced by Harry Saltzman and Albert R. Broccoli of Eon Productions, a partnership that continued until 1975. In the film, James Bond is sent to Jamaica to investigate the disappearance of a fellow British agent. The trail leads him to the underground base of Dr. No, who is plotting to disrupt an early American space launch from Cape Canaveral with a radio beam weapon.

Although it was the first of the Bond books to be made into a film, Dr. No was the sixth of Fleming's series, which began with Casino Royale. The film makes a few references to threads from earlier books, and later books in the series as well, such as the criminal organisation SPECTRE, which was not introduced until the 1961 novel Thunderball. Produced on a low budget, Dr. No was released by United Artists on 5 October 1962 and was a financial success. While the film received a mixed critical reaction upon release, it has gained a reputation over time as one of the series' best instalments. Dr. No also launched a genre of secret agent films that flourished in the 1960s. The film spawned a comic book adaptation and soundtrack album as part of its promotion and marketing.

Many aspects of a typical James Bond film were established in Dr. No. The film begins with an introduction to the character through the view of a gun barrel and a highly stylised main title sequence, both of which were created by Maurice Binder. It also introduced the iconic theme music written by the film's score composer Monty Norman. Production designer Ken Adam established an elaborate visual style that is one of the hallmarks of the film series. Dr. No was followed by From Russia with Love in 1963.

== Plot ==
John Strangways, the Station Chief of the British Secret Intelligence Service in Jamaica, is murdered, along with his secretary, by a trio of assassins. Strangways had been helping the CIA investigate radio jamming of rocket launches from Cape Canaveral. After the Service loses radio contact with the station, James Bond is sent to investigate by M, the head of the Service. Before leaving, Bond has an intimate encounter with Sylvia Trench, a woman he met while playing chemin de fer.

Landing in Jamaica, an enemy agent posing as a chauffeur meets Bond. During the ride, Bond overpowers the agent who commits suicide using a cyanide-laced cigarette. Bond arranges with the principal secretary Pleydell-Smith to meet those who last saw Strangways, including geologist Professor Dent. At Strangways' home, Bond finds a receipt from Dent and a picture of Strangways and Quarrel, who tailed Bond from the airport earlier. Bond finds Quarrel who is working with CIA agent Felix Leiter. Leiter says Quarrel has been helping him and Strangways search for the radio jamming source. One island in the area, Crab Key, is controlled by a mysterious man named Dr. No, and is generally off limits. Under the cover of night, Quarrel and Strangways had obtained rock samples from the island.

Bond visits Dent, who falsely claims that the radioactive samples were iron pyrites. Dent travels to Crab Key, where Dr. No instructs him to kill Bond with a tarantula. Bond kills the spider, then arranges to meet Pleydell-Smith's secretary Miss Taro, who is behaving suspiciously. On the drive to her home, assassins try to run Bond off the road, but they crash and die. Bond has sex with Taro, then has her arrested. Bond waits in ambush for Dent, whose attempt on his life ends with Dent dead.

Quarrel takes Bond to Crab Key, where they meet Honey Ryder, a shell diver. The trio trek through the jungle to avoid armed guards. At nightfall, the trio enter a radiation-contaminated swamp and encounter a flame tank, which kills Quarrel. Bond and Ryder are captured and taken to Dr. No's base, where they are decontaminated. They are taken to comfortable suites and given clothes and coffee. The coffee is drugged, and puts them to sleep.

That evening, Bond and Ryder dine with Dr. No, revealed to be a Chinese-German scientist with prosthetic metal hands. Dr. No was a member of a Chinese tong, but now works for the criminal organisation SPECTRE, which intends to disrupt a Project Mercury space launch at Cape Canaveral. When Bond refuses to join SPECTRE, Dr. No orders his guards to beat Bond, then imprisons Bond and Ryder separately. Bond escapes through an air vent and infiltrates the base's control centre.

Bond overloads the nuclear pool reactor as the launch commences. Dr. No fights him, but falls into the reactor pool and killed. As the base's personnel evacuate, Bond frees Ryder. They escape the island by boat moments before the base is destroyed. Felix finds the pair adrift at sea after their boat runs out of fuel, and has them towed by a Royal Navy ship. As Bond and Ryder kiss, Bond unhooks the towrope, setting their boat adrift again.

== Cast ==
- Sean Connery as James Bond: a British MI6 agent, codename 007
- Ursula Andress as Honey Ryder: a local shell diver, making a living by selling Jamaican seashells to dealers in Miami
  - Andress' spoken dialogue was dubbed by Nikki van der Zyl, and her singing voice was dubbed by Diana Coupland. Both were uncredited.
- Joseph Wiseman as Dr. No: a reclusive member of SPECTRE
- Jack Lord as Felix Leiter: a CIA operative sent to liaise with James Bond while he is in Kingston. This was Lord's only appearance as Leiter.
- Bernard Lee as M: the head of the British Secret Service
- Anthony Dawson as Professor R. J. Dent: a geologist with a practice in Kingston, who also secretly works for Dr. No
- John Kitzmiller as Quarrel: a Cayman Islander who was employed by John Strangways to secretly go to Crab Key to collect rock samples. He also worked with Felix Leiter before Bond's arrival.
- Zena Marshall as Miss Taro: the secretary to Mr. Pleydell-Smith at Government House in Kingston. She is actually a double agent working for Dr. No.
- Eunice Gayson as Sylvia Trench: a woman who meets Bond during a game of Baccarat at the London club Le Cercle
- Michel Mok as Sister Rose: another warden working at Dr. No's lair
- Lois Maxwell as Miss Moneypenny: the secretary to M
- Peter Burton as Major Boothroyd: the head of Q-Branch. Boothroyd is brought in by M to replace Bond's Beretta M1934 with a Walther PPK. This was Burton's only appearance as Q.
- Yvonne Shima as Sister Lily: a prison warden working at Dr. No's lair
- Louis Blaazer as Pleydell-Smith: Chief Secretary at Government House in Kingston
- Reginald Carter as Mr. Jones: a henchman of Dr. No who was sent to pick up 007 at the Palisadoes Airport
- Marguerite LeWars as Annabel Chung: a photographer and one of Dr. No's operatives who trails Bond
- Timothy Moxon as Strangways: the head of the Kingston station for the MI6, murdered by Dr. No's henchmen impersonating three blind men
  - Moxon's dialogue was dubbed by Robert Rietti. Neither Moxon nor Rietti were credited.

Additional cast members include William Foster-Davis as Police Superintendent Duff, Dolores Keator as Strangways' secretary, Lester Prendergast as Quarrel's friend Puss Feller, and Anthony Chinn as Chen, one of No's lab technicians who was impersonated by Bond. Byron Lee and the Dragonaires appear as themselves, performing at Puss Feller's nightclub. Milton Reid, who later acted in The Spy Who Loved Me, appears as one of Dr. No's guards.

== Production ==
Ian Fleming first wrote Dr. No as a television outline for film producer Henry Morgenthau III to promote the Jamaican tourism industry. After this project fell through Fleming began meeting with Canadian film producer Harry Saltzman about making a screen adaptation. Although Fleming was not a fan of the "kitchen-sink realist" genre Saltzman was known for producing, after seeing Saturday Night and Sunday Morning, Fleming sold him the rights to all of the James Bond novels except Casino Royale and Thunderball for $50,000. After Saltzman gained the rights for the novel, he initially had trouble financing the project. Screenwriter Wolf Mankowitz introduced Saltzman to Albert R. "Cubby" Broccoli, who wanted the rights to the novels and attempted to buy them from Saltzman. Saltzman did not want to sell the rights to Broccoli and instead, they formed a partnership to make the films. A number of Hollywood film studios did not want to fund the films, finding them "too British" or "too blatantly sexual". Eventually, the two received authorisation from United Artists to produce Dr. No, to be released in 1962. Saltzman and Broccoli created two companies: Danjaq, which was to hold the rights to the films, and Eon Productions, which was to produce them. The partnership between Broccoli and Saltzman lasted until 1975, when tensions during the filming of The Man with the Golden Gun led to an acrimonious split, and Saltzman sold his shares of Danjaq to United Artists.

Initially, Broccoli and Saltzman had wanted to produce the eighth Bond novel, 1961's Thunderball, as the first film, but there was an ongoing legal dispute between the screenplay's co-author, Kevin McClory, and Ian Fleming. As a result, Broccoli and Saltzman chose Dr. No: the timing was apposite, with claims that American rocket testing at Cape Canaveral had problems with rockets going astray.

The producers' first choice for the director was Phil Karlson, who asked for too high a salary. They offered Dr. No to Guy Green, Guy Hamilton, Val Guest and Ken Hughes to direct, but all of them turned it down. They finally signed Terence Young, who had a long background with Broccoli's Warwick Films as the director. Broccoli and Saltzman felt that Young would be able to make a real impression of James Bond and transfer the essence of the character from book to film. Young imposed many stylistic choices for the character, which continued throughout the film series. Young also decided to inject much humour, as he considered that "a lot of things in this film, the sex, and violence, and so on if played straight, a) would be objectionable, and b) we're never gonna go past the censors; but the moment you take the mickey out, put the tongue out in the cheek, it seems to disarm."

The producers asked United Artists for financing, but the studio would only put up $1 million. Later, the UK arm of United Artists provided an extra $100,000 to create the climax where Dr. No's base explodes. As a result of the low budget, only one sound editor was hired (normally there are two, one for sound effects and another for dialogue), and many pieces of scenery were made in cheaper ways, with M's office featuring cardboard paintings and a door covered in a leather-like plastic, the room where Dent meets Dr. No costing only £745 to build, and the aquarium in Dr. No's base being magnified stock footage of goldfish. Furthermore, when art director Syd Cain found out his name was not in the credits, Broccoli gave him a golden pen to compensate, saying that he did not want to spend money making the credits again. Production designer Ken Adam later told UK daily newspaper The Guardian in 2005:

The budget for Dr. No was under $1m for the whole picture. My budget was £14,500. I filled three stages at Pinewood full of sets while they were filming in Jamaica. It wasn't a real aquarium in Dr. No's apartment. It was a disaster to tell you the truth because we had so little money. We decided to use a rear-projection screen and get some stock footage of fish. What we didn't realise was because we didn't have much money the only stock footage they could buy was of goldfish-sized fish, so we had to blow up the size and put a line in the dialogue with Bond talking about the magnification. I didn't see any reason why Dr. No shouldn't have good taste so we mixed contemporary furniture and antiques. We thought it would be fun for him to have some stolen art so we used Goya's Portrait of the Duke of Wellington, which was still missing at the time. I got hold of a slide from the National Gallery – this was on the Friday, shooting began on the Monday – and I painted a Goya over the weekend. It was pretty good so they used it for publicity purposes but, just like the real one, it got stolen while it was on display.

=== Writing ===
Broccoli had originally hired Richard Maibaum and his friend Wolf Mankowitz to write Dr. No's screenplay, partly because of Mankowitz's help in brokering the deal between Broccoli and Saltzman. They wanted to rewrite the character of Dr. No since they saw him as little more than a "Fu Manchu with steel hooks". An initial draft of the screenplay was rejected because the scriptwriters had made the book's villain, Dr. No, a marmoset who is controlled by the real antagonist, a shipping magnate named Buckfield who plans to destroy the Panama Canal locks. Mankowitz left the film, and Maibaum then undertook a second version of the story, more closely in line with the novel. Mankowitz eventually had his name removed from the credits after viewing early rushes, as he feared it would be a disaster. Johanna Harwood and thriller writer Berkely Mather then worked on Maibaum's script. Terence Young described Harwood as a script doctor who helped put elements more in tune with a British character. Harwood stated in an interview in a Cinema Retro special on the making of the film that she had been a screenwriter of several of Harry Saltzman's projects; she said both her screenplays for Dr. No and her screenplay for From Russia with Love had followed Fleming's novels closely.

During the series' decades-long history only a few of the films have remained substantially true to their source material; Dr. No has many similarities to the novel and follows its basic plot, but there are a few notable omissions. Major elements from the novel that are missing from the film include Bond's fight with a giant squid, and the escape from Dr. No's complex using the dragon-disguised swamp buggy – although the film did use this as the inspiration behind the flame throwing vehicle that pursues Bond, Honey and Quarrel through the swamp. Elements of the novel that were significantly changed for the film include the use of a (non-venomous) tarantula spider instead of a centipede; Dr. No's secret complex being disguised as a bauxite mine instead of a guano quarry; Dr. No's plot to disrupt NASA space launches from Cape Canaveral using a radio beam instead of disrupting US missile testing on Turks Island; the method of Dr. No's death by boiling in overheating reactor coolant rather than a burial under a chute of guano, and the introduction of SPECTRE, an organisation that was not to be introduced in the books until Thunderball. The introduction of Dr. No's disruptions of NASA launches was added because of a perception that the United States was falling behind the Soviet Union in the Space Race. Additionally, although the series would be associated with the Cold War, Saltzman and Broccoli introduced SPECTRE as a substitute for the Soviet Union to avoid commenting on the international political situation. Components absent from the novel but added to the film include the introduction of the Bond character in a gambling casino, the introduction of Bond's semi-regular girlfriend Sylvia Trench, a fight scene with an enemy chauffeur, a fight scene to introduce Quarrel, the seduction of Miss Taro, Bond's recurring CIA ally Felix Leiter, Dr. No's partner in crime Professor Dent, and Bond's controversial cold-blooded killing of this character.

Sometimes episodes in the novel retained in the film's altered narrative introduce elements of absurdity into the plot. Bond's "escape" from his cell via the air shaft, for instance, originally conceived as a ruse of Dr. No's to test Bond's skill and endurance, becomes an authentic break-out in the film. Features carried over from the novel's obstacle course, however, such as the torrent of water and scalding surface, have no logical justification in the script. Such incongruities recurred in subsequent Bond films.

=== Casting ===
==== James Bond ====
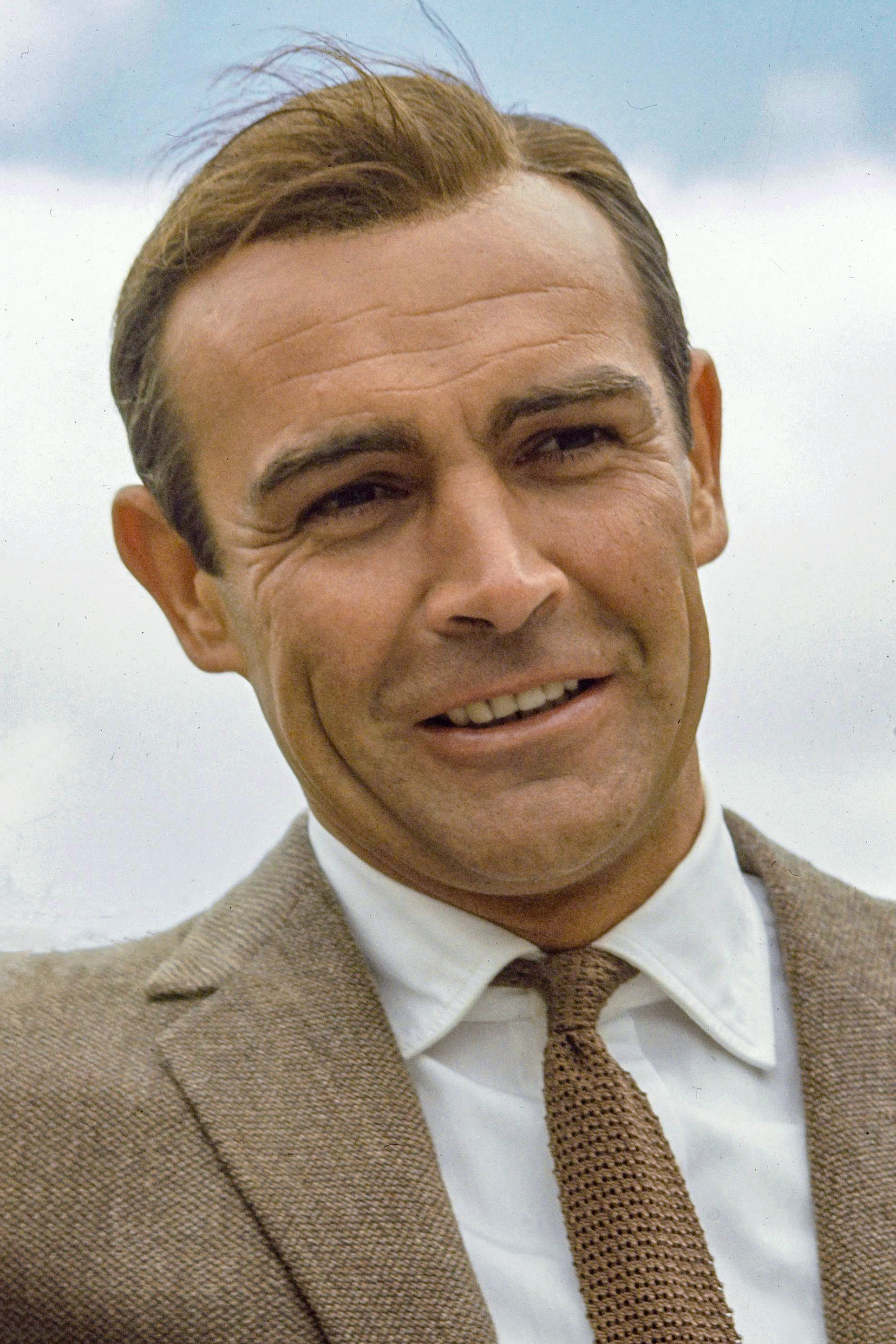
Sean Connery in 1964

While producers Broccoli and Saltzman originally sought Cary Grant for the role, they discarded the idea as Grant would be committed to only one feature film, and the producers decided to go after someone who could be part of a series. James Mason as Bond was discarded for similar reasons as he only wanted to do two films. Richard Johnson has claimed to have been the first choice of the director, but he turned it down because he already had a contract with MGM and was intending to leave. Another actor purported to have been considered for the role was Patrick McGoohan on the strength of his portrayal of spy John Drake in the television series Danger Man: McGoohan turned down the role on moral grounds as a Catholic. Another potential Bond included David Niven, who later played the character in the 1967 parody Casino Royale. Rod Taylor was also approached to screentest for the role, but he rejected the offer as he felt that the role was "beneath" him.

There are several apocryphal stories as to whom Ian Fleming personally wanted. Reportedly, Fleming favoured actor Richard Todd. Fleming's stepson Paul Morgan claims that Fleming preferred Edward Underdown. In his autobiography When the Snow Melts, Cubby Broccoli said Roger Moore had been considered, but had been thought "too young, perhaps a shade too pretty". In his autobiography, My Word Is My Bond, Moore says he was never approached to play the role of Bond until 1972, for Live and Let Die. Moore appeared as Simon Templar on the television series The Saint, airing in the United Kingdom for the first time on 4 October 1962, only one day before the premiere of Dr. No.

Ultimately, the producers turned to 31-year-old Sean Connery for five films. It is often reported that Connery won the role through a contest set up to "find James Bond". While this is untrue, the contest itself did exist, and six finalists were chosen and screen-tested by Broccoli, Saltzman and Fleming. The winner of the contest was a 28-year-old model named Peter Anthony, who, according to Broccoli, had a Gregory Peck quality, but proved unable to cope with the role. When Connery was invited to meet Broccoli and Saltzman he appeared scruffy and in unpressed clothes, but Connery "put on an act and it paid off" as he acted in the meeting with a macho, devil-may-care attitude. When he left, both Saltzman and Broccoli watched him through the window as he went to his car, both agreeing that he was the right man for Bond. After Connery was chosen, Terence Young took the actor to his tailor and hairdresser, and introduced him to the high life, restaurants, casinos and women of London. In the words of Bond writer Raymond Benson, Young educated the actor "in the ways of being dapper, witty, and above all, cool". The casting was announced on November 3, 1961.

==== Secondary cast ====
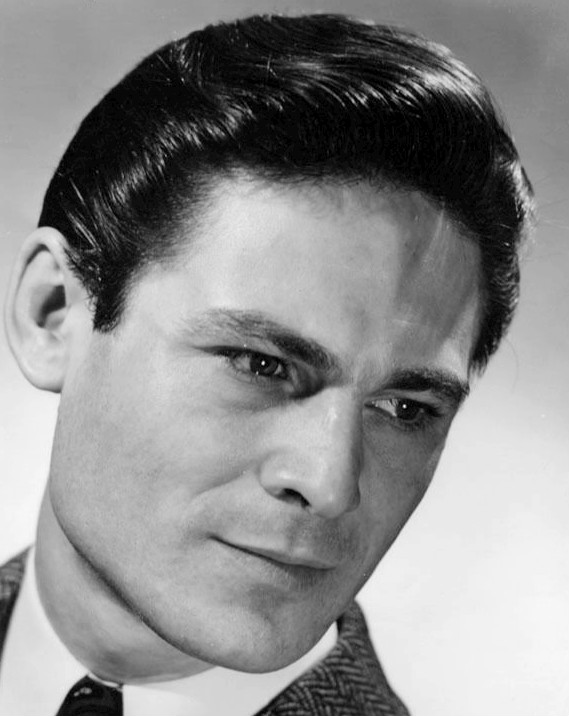
Ursula Andress (in 1963) and Joseph Wiseman (in 1950)

For the first Bond girl Honey Ryder, Julie Christie was considered, but producer Albert R. Broccoli reportedly thought her breasts were too small. Martine Beswick was also rejected for being too inexperienced as an actress, while Gabriella Licudi was rejected as too young. Just two weeks before filming began, Ursula Andress was chosen to play Honey after the producers saw a picture of her taken by Andress' then-husband John Derek. Kirk Douglas persuaded Andress to take the part at a party hosted by Derek. To appear more convincing as a Jamaican, Andress had a tan painted on her and ultimately had her lines redubbed by voice actress Nikki van der Zyl due to Andress' heavy Swiss-German accent. For Bond's antagonist Dr. No, Ian Fleming wanted his friend Noël Coward, and Coward answered the invitation with "No! No! No!" Fleming considered that his step-cousin, Christopher Lee, would be good for the role of Dr. No, although, by the time Fleming told the producers, they had already chosen Joseph Wiseman for the part. Harry Saltzman picked Wiseman because of his performance in the 1951 film Detective Story, and the actor had special make-up applied to evoke No's Chinese heritage. Swedish actor Max von Sydow was also offered the role as Dr. No, but turned it down. He was later to appear as Ernst Stavro Blofeld in the unofficial James Bond film Never Say Never Again.

The role as the first Felix Leiter was given to Jack Lord. This is Bond and Leiter's first time meeting each other on film and Leiter does not appear in the novel. Leiter returns for many of Bond's future adventures and in the 2006 reboot of the film series, Casino Royale, Leiter and Bond are seen meeting one another again for the first time. This was Lord's only appearance as Leiter, as he asked for more money and a better billing to return as Leiter in Goldfinger and was subsequently replaced.

The cast also included a number of actors who were to become stalwarts of the future films, including Bernard Lee, who played Bond's superior M for another ten films, and Lois Maxwell, who played M's secretary Moneypenny in fourteen instalments of the series. Maxwell received the part after beginning to look for film roles to support her family when her husband Peter Marriot suffered from a severe heart attack and was expected to die. Lee was chosen because of being a "prototypical father figure", and Maxwell after Fleming thought she was the perfect fit for his description of the character. Maxwell was initially offered a choice between the roles of Moneypenny or Sylvia Trench and opted for Moneypenny as she thought the Trench role, which included appearing in immodest dress, was too sexual. Eunice Gayson was cast as Sylvia Trench and it was planned that she would be a recurring girlfriend for Bond throughout six films, although she appeared only in Dr. No and From Russia with Love. She had been given the part by director Terence Young, who had worked with her in Zarak and invited Gayson, saying: "You always bring me luck in my films", although she was also cast due to her voluptuous figure. One role which was not given to a future regular was that of Major Boothroyd, the head of Q-Branch, which was given to Peter Burton. Burton was unavailable for the subsequent film, From Russia with Love, and the role was taken by Desmond Llewelyn.

Anthony Dawson, who played Professor Dent, was a veteran character actor who had notably played a murderer in Alfred Hitchcock film Dial M for Murder. Dawson also portrayed Ernst Stavro Blofeld, head of SPECTRE, in From Russia with Love and Thunderball, although his face was never seen and his voice was redubbed by Austrian actor Eric Pohlmann. Zena Marshall, who played Miss Taro, was mostly attracted by the humorous elements of the script, and described her role as "this attractive little siren, and at the same time I was the spy, a bad woman", whom Young asked to play "not as Chinese, but a Mid-Atlantic woman who men dream about but is not real". The role of Taro was previously rejected by Marguerite LeWars, the Miss Jamaica 1961 who worked at the Kingston airport, as it required being "wrapped in a towel, lying in a bed, kissing a strange man". Talitha Pol, Lina Margo and Violet Marceau were also considered for the part. Timothy Moxon, who played Strangways, met director Terence Young when he was working as a stage actor in London, but by the time of the film's shooting, he was working as a pilot and crop duster in Jamaica.

=== Filming ===
James Bond's Jamaica in Dr No

Dr. No is set in London, Jamaica, and Crab Key, a fictional island off Jamaica. Filming began on location at Palisadoes Airport in Kingston, Jamaica, on 16 January 1962. The primary scenes there were the exterior shots of Crab Key and Kingston, where an uncredited Syd Cain acted as art director and also designed the Dragon Tank. Shooting took place a few yards from Fleming's Goldeneye estate, and the author regularly visited the filming with friends. Location filming was largely in Oracabessa, with additional scenes on the Palisadoes strip and Port Royal in St Andrew. On 21 February, production left Jamaica with footage still unfilmed due to a change of weather. Five days later, filming began at Pinewood Studios, Buckinghamshire, England, with sets designed by Ken Adam, which included Dr. No's base, the ventilation duct and the interior of the British Secret Service headquarters. The studio was used on the majority of later Bond films. Adam's initial budget for the entire film was just £14,500 (£270,635 in 2025), but the producers were convinced to give him an extra £6,000 out of their own finances. After 58 days of filming, principal photography was completed on 30 March 1962. Filmmaker Brian Trenchard-Smith, who visited Pinewood with his Wellington College film society during the shooting of the film, noted that Bond's awakening and first sighting of Honey was a pick-up shot filmed in a ten-foot-long space on an otherwise empty soundstage, and that Adam's set for the nuclear reactor was "a lot smaller than it looks on the screen. That opened my eyes to the power of lenses when I saw the finished movie a year later." Costume designer Tessa Prendergast designed Honey's bikini, with a British Army webbing belt.

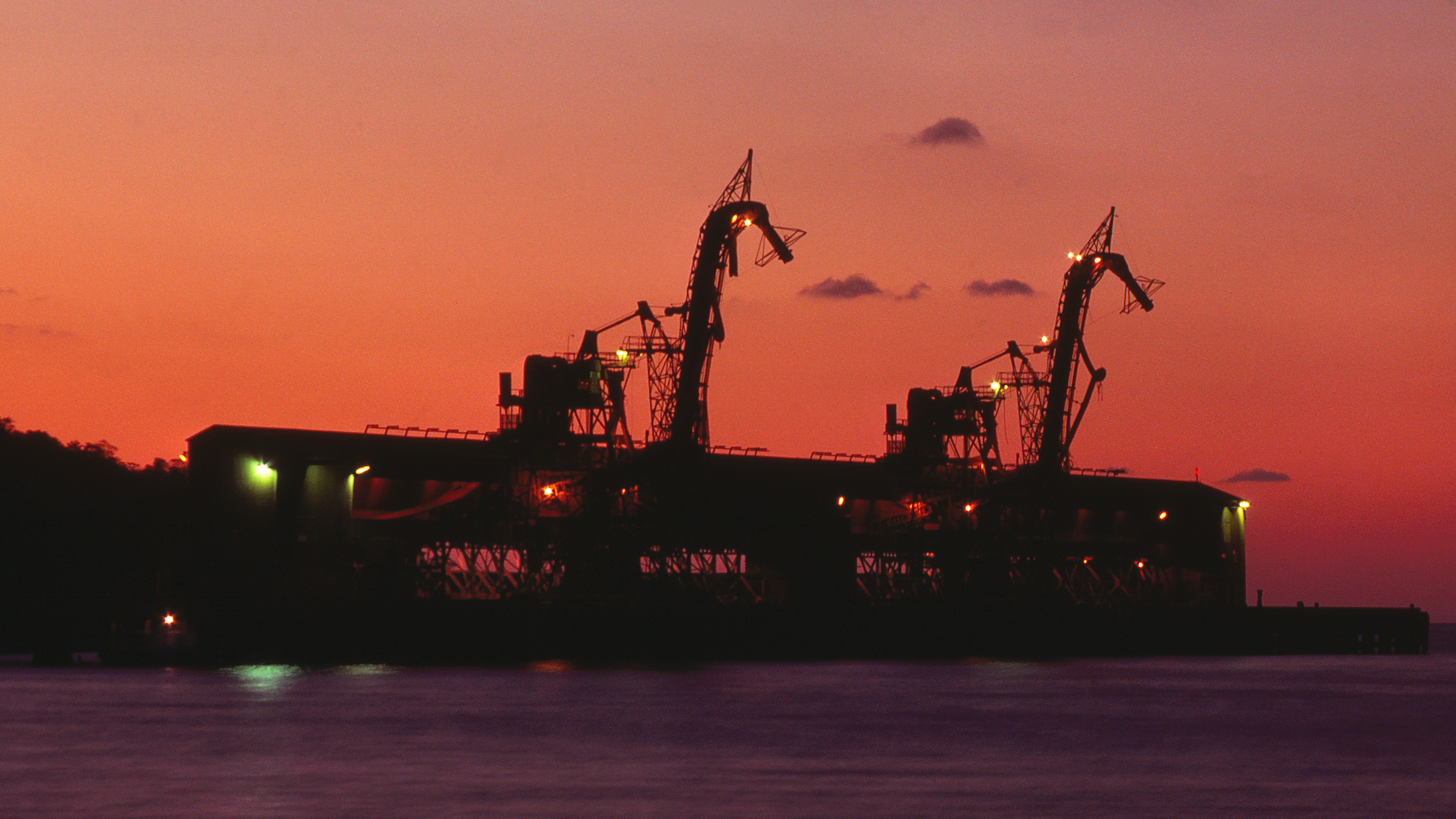
Dr. No's lair was the Reynolds Ocho Rios bauxite pier

The scene where a tarantula walks over Bond was initially shot by pinning a bed to the wall and placing Sean Connery over it, with a protective glass between him and the spider. Director Young did not like the final results, so the scenes were interlaced with new footage featuring the tarantula over stuntman Bob Simmons. Simmons, who was uncredited for the film, described the scene as the most frightening stunt he had ever performed. In line with the book, a scene was to feature Honey tied to the ground and left to be attacked by crabs, but since the crabs were sent frozen from the Caribbean, they moved little during filming, so the scene was altered to have Honey slowly drowning. During the car chase scene, Connery insisted on doing a stunt himself; he drove under a construction crane with only inches to spare, which nearly killed him. Simmons also served as the film's fight choreographer, employing a rough fighting style. The noted violence of Dr. No, which also included Bond shooting Dent in cold blood, caused producers to make adaptations to get an "A" rating—allowing minors to enter accompanied by an adult—from the British Board of Film Classification.

When Bond is about to have dinner with Dr. No, he is amazed to see Goya's Portrait of the Duke of Wellington. The painting had been stolen from the National Gallery by a 60-year-old amateur thief in London just before filming began. Ken Adam had contacted the National Gallery in London to obtain a slide of the picture, painting the copy over the course of the weekend, prior to filming commencing on the following Monday.

Editor Peter R. Hunt used an innovative editing technique, with extensive use of quick cuts, and employing fast motion and exaggerated sound effects on the action scenes. Hunt said his intention was to "move fast and push it along the whole time, while giving it a certain style", and added that the fast pacing would help audiences not notice any writing problems. As title artist Maurice Binder was creating the credits, he had an idea for the introduction that appeared in all subsequent Bond films, the James Bond gun barrel sequence. It was filmed in sepia by putting a pinhole camera inside an .38 calibre gun barrel, with Bob Simmons playing Bond. Binder also designed a highly stylised main title sequence, a theme that has been repeated in the subsequent Eon-produced Bond films. Binder's budget for the title sequence was £2,000 (£37,329 in 2025).

== Soundtrack ==
Monty Norman was invited to write the film score because Broccoli liked his work on the 1961 theatre production Belle, a musical about murderer Hawley Harvey Crippen. Norman was busy with musicals, and only agreed to do the music for Dr. No after Saltzman allowed him to travel along with the crew to Jamaica. The most famous composition in the soundtrack is the "James Bond Theme", which is heard in the gun barrel sequence and in a calypso medley over the title credits, and was written by Norman based on a previous composition of his. John Barry, who would later go on to compose the music for eleven Bond films, arranged the Bond theme but was uncredited—except for the credit of his orchestra playing the final piece. It has occasionally been suggested that Barry, not Norman, composed the "James Bond Theme". This argument has been the subject of two court cases, the most recent in 2001, which found in favour of Norman. The theme, as written by Norman and arranged by Barry, was described by another Bond film composer, David Arnold, as "bebop-swing vibe coupled with that vicious, dark, distorted electric guitar, definitely an instrument of rock 'n' roll ... it represented everything about the character you would want: It was cocky, swaggering, confident, dark, dangerous, suggestive, sexy, unstoppable. And he did it in two minutes."

The music for the opening scene is a calypso version of the nursery rhyme "Three Blind Mice", with new lyrics to reflect the intentions of the three assassins hired by Dr. No. Other notable songs in the film are the song "Jump Up", played in the background, and the traditional Jamaican calypso "Under the Mango Tree", famously sung by Diana Coupland (then Norman's wife), the singing voice of Honey Ryder, as she walked out of the ocean on Crab Key. Byron Lee and the Dragonaires appeared in the film performing "Jump Up" and also performed some of the music on the later soundtrack album. Lee and other Jamaican musicians who appear in the soundtrack, including Ernest Ranglin and Carlos Malcolm, were introduced to Norman by Chris Blackwell, the owner of then-small label Island Records who worked in the film as a location scout. The original soundtrack album was released by United Artists Records in 1963 as well as several cover versions of the "James Bond Theme" on Columbia Records. A single of the "James Bond Theme" entered the UK Singles Chart in 1962, reaching a peak position of number thirteen during an eleven-week spell in the charts. Ranglin, who had acted as arranger on several tracks, and Malcolm sued Eon for unpaid fees, both settling out of court; Malcolm and his band performed a year later at the film's premiere in Kingston.

== Release ==
=== Promotion ===
As soon as late 1961, United Artists started a marketing campaign to make James Bond a well-known name in North America. Newspapers received a box set of Bond's books, as well as a booklet detailing the Bond character and a picture of Ursula Andress. Eon and United Artists made licensing deals revolving around the character's tastes, having merchandising tie-ins with drink, tobacco, men's clothing and car companies. The campaign also focused on Ian Fleming's name due to the minor success of the books. After Dr. No had a successful run in Europe, Sean Connery and Terence Young did a cross-country tour of the US in March 1963, which featured screening previews for the film and press conferences. It culminated in a well-publicised premiere in Kingston, where most of the film is set. Some of the campaign emphasised the sex appeal of the film, with the poster artwork, by Mitchell Hooks, depicting Sean Connery and four scantily clad women. The campaign also included the 007 logo designed by Joseph Caroff with a pistol as part of the seven.

Dr. No had its worldwide premiere at the London Pavilion, on 5 October 1962, expanding to the rest of the United Kingdom three days later. The North American premiere on 8 May 1963 was more low-profile, with 450 cinemas in Midwest and Southwest regions of the United States. On 29 May, it opened in both Los Angeles and New York City – in the former as a double-bill with The Young and the Brave and the latter in United Artists' "Premiere Showcase" treatment, screening in 84 screens across the city to avoid the costly Broadway cinemas.

=== Home video ===
Dr. No has been distributed on CED Videodisc (1981), VHS (1982, unredacted), Betamax (1982, unredacted), LaserDisc, DVD, Blu-ray, Multi-Format streaming, and other formats.

== Reception ==
=== Critical response ===
Dr. No received a mixed critical reception. Time magazine called Bond a "blithering bounder" and "a great big hairy marshmallow" who "almost always manages to seem slightly silly". Stanley Kauffmann in The New Republic wrote that he felt the film "never decides whether it is suspense or suspense-spoof". He also did not like Connery, or the Fleming novels. The Vatican condemned Dr. No describing it as "a dangerous mixture of violence, vulgarity, sadism and sex", whilst the Kremlin stated that Bond was the personification of capitalist evil – both controversies helped increase public awareness of the film and greater cinema attendance. However, Leonard Mosely in the Daily Express wrote that "Dr. No is fun all the way, and even the sex is harmless", and Penelope Gilliatt in The Observer wrote it was "full of submerged self-parody". The Guardian's critic called Dr. No "crisp and well-tailored" and "a neat and gripping thriller".

In the years that followed its release, it became more popular. Writing in 1986, Danny Peary described Dr. No as a "cleverly conceived adaptation of Ian Fleming's enjoyable spy thriller ... Picture has sex, violence, wit, terrific action sequences, and colorful atmosphere ... Connery, Andress, and Wiseman all give memorable performances. There's a slow stretch in the middle and Dr. No could use a decent henchman, but otherwise, the film works marvelously." Describing Dr. No as "a different type of film", Peary notes that "Looking back, one can understand why it caused so much excitement."

In 1999, it was ranked forty-one on the BFI top 100 British films list compiled by the British Film Institute. The 2005 American Film Institute's '100 Years' series also recognised the character of James Bond himself in the film as the third greatest film hero. He was also placed at number eleven on a similar list by Empire. Première also listed Bond as the fifth greatest movie character of all time.

On Rotten Tomatoes, Dr. No holds a 95% "rating based on 63 reviews, with an average rating of 7.8/10. The site's critical consensus reads: "Featuring plenty of the humor, action and escapist thrills the series would be known for, Dr. No kicks off the Bond franchise in style."

=== Popular reaction ===
In the United Kingdom, playing in 168 cinemas, Dr. No grossed $840,000 in two weeks and wound up being the fifth most popular movie of the year there. The box office results in mainland Europe were also positive. The film ended up grossing $6 million, making it a financial success compared to its $1 million budget. The original North American gross rental was $2 million, increasing to $6 million after its first reissue in 1965, as a double feature with From Russia with Love. The following reissue was in 1966 paired with Goldfinger, to compensate the fact that the next Bond movie would only come out in the following year. The total gross of Dr. No ended up being $59.6 million worldwide, IGN listed it as sixth-best Bond film ever, Entertainment Weekly put it at seventh among Bond films, and Norman Wilner of MSN as twelfth best. The review aggregator website Rotten Tomatoes sampled 56 reviews and judged 95% of the reviews as positive. President John F. Kennedy was a fan of Ian Fleming's novels and requested a private showing of Dr. No in the White House.

In 2003, the scene of Andress emerging from the water in a bikini topped Channel 4's list of one hundred sexiest scenes of film history. The bikini was sold in 2001 at an auction for $61,500. Entertainment Weekly and IGN ranked her first in a top ten "Bond babes" list.

=== The introduction of James Bond ===
A seminal moment in cinema. Sean Connery introduces James Bond to the film world with his trademark statement, "Bond, James Bond."

The character James Bond was introduced towards, but not at, the beginning of the film in a "now-famous nightclub sequence featuring Sylvia Trench", to whom he makes his "immortal introduction". The introduction to the character in Le Cercle at Les Ambassadeurs, an upmarket gambling club, is derived from Bond's introduction in the first novel, Casino Royale, which Fleming had used because "skill at gambling and knowledge of how to behave in a casino were seen ... as attributes of a gentleman". After losing a hand of Chemin de Fer to Bond, Trench asks his name. There is the "most important gesture [in] ... the way he lights his cigarette before giving her the satisfaction of an answer. 'Bond, James Bond'." Once Connery says his line, Monty Norman's Bond theme plays "and creates an indelible link between music and character." In the short scene introducing Bond, there are portrayed "qualities of strength, action, reaction, violence – and this elegant, slightly brutal gambler with the quizzical sneer we see before us who answers a woman when he's good and ready." Raymond Benson, author of the continuation Bond novels, has stated that as the music fades up on the scene, "we have ourselves a piece of classic cinema".

Following the release of Dr. No, the quote "Bond ... James Bond", became a catch phrase that entered the lexicon of Western popular culture: writers Cork and Scivally said of the introduction in Dr. No that the "signature introduction would become the most famous and loved film line ever". In 2001, it was voted as the "best-loved one-liner in cinema" by British cinema goers. In 2005, it was honoured as the 22nd greatest quotation in cinema history by the American Film Institute as part of their 100 Years Series.

== Comic book adaptation ==
Around the time of Dr. No's release in October 1962, a comic book adaptation of the screenplay, written by Norman J. Nodel, was published in the United Kingdom as part of the Classics Illustrated anthology series. It was later reprinted in the United States by DC Comics as part of its Showcase anthology series, in January 1963. This was the first American comic book appearance of James Bond and is noteworthy for being a relatively rare example of a British comic being reprinted in a fairly high-profile American comic. It was also one of the earliest comics to be censored on racial grounds (some skin tones and dialogue were changed for the American market).

== Legacy ==
It is because of [Ken Adam] that people believe criminal masterminds operate from the insides of dormant volcanoes and travel between their sumptuously decorated lairs on chrome-plated monorails. It's his fault that we think gold bars are stacked in vast cathedral-tall warehouses and that secret agents escape capture by using jetpacks or ejector seats.

— Johnny Dee, writing in The Guardian (2005).

Dr. No was the first of 25 James Bond films produced by Eon, which have grossed just over $5 billion in box office returns alone, making the series one of the highest-grossing ever. It is estimated that since Dr. No, a quarter of the world's population have seen at least one Bond film. Dr. No also launched a successful genre of "secret agent" films that flourished in the 1960s. The UK Film Distributors' Association have stated that the importance of Dr. No to the British film industry cannot be overstated, as it, and the subsequent Bond series of films, "form the backbone of the industry".

Dr. No – and the Bond films in general – also inspired television output, with the NBC series The Man from U.N.C.L.E., which was described as the "first network television imitation" of Bond. The style of the Bond films, largely derived from production designer Ken Adam, is one of the hallmarks of the Bond film series, and the effect of his work on Dr. No's lair can be seen in another film he worked on, Dr. Strangelove.

As the first film in the series, a number of the elements of Dr. No were contributors to subsequent films, including Monty Norman's "James Bond Theme" and Maurice Binder's gun barrel sequence, variants of which all appeared in subsequent films. These conventions were also lampooned in spoof films, such as the Austin Powers series. The first spoof films happened relatively soon after Dr. No, with the 1964 film Carry On Spying showing the villain Dr. Crow being overcome by agents who included Charlie Bind (Charles Hawtrey) and Daphne Honeybutt (Barbara Windsor).

Sales of Fleming's novels rose sharply after the release of Dr. No and the subsequent films. In the seven months after Dr. No was released, 1.5 million copies of the novel were sold. Worldwide sales of all the Bond books rose throughout the 1960s as Dr. No and the subsequent films – From Russia with Love and Goldfinger – were released: in 1961 500,000 books had been sold, which rose to six million in 1964 and seven million in 1965. Between 1962 and 1967, a total of nearly 22.8 million Bond novels were sold.

The film influenced ladies' fashion, with the bikini worn by Ursula Andress proving to be a huge hit: "not only sent sales of two-piece swimwear skyrocketing, it also made Andress an international celebrity". Andress herself acknowledged that the "bikini made me into a success. As a result of starring in Dr. No as the first Bond girl I was given the freedom to take my pick of future roles and to become financially independent". It has been claimed that the use of the swimwear in Dr. No led to "the biggest impact on the history of the bikini".

Taschen published Paul Duncan's book James Bond: Dr. No in 2024 at the price of $US850 and $US1750.

=== Global James Bond Day ===
On 5 October 2012, fifty years after the release of the film, Eon Productions celebrated "Global James Bond Day", a series of events around the world. Events included a film festival of showings of the James Bond films, a documentary of the series, an online auction for charity and further events at the Museum of Modern Art and the Toronto International Film Festival. A concert of various music was held in Los Angeles in conjunction with the New York event. The day also saw the release of "Skyfall", the theme song of the 2012 James Bond film of the same name; the song was released at 0:07 BST.

== See also ==
- Outline of James Bond
