= Portrayal of James Bond in film =

James Bond
- James Bond character
- The gun barrel sequence from the Eon Productions film Dr. No
- First appearance: Dr. No (1962)
- Based on: James Bond by Ian Fleming
- Portrayed by: Sean Connery (1962–1967, 1971, 1983); David Niven (1967); George Lazenby (1969); Roger Moore (1973–1985); Timothy Dalton (1987–1989); Pierce Brosnan (1995–2002); Daniel Craig (2006–2021); Robert Pattinson (upcoming)

In-universe information
- Alias: 007
- Title: Commander (Royal Navy)
- Occupation: 00 Agent
- Nationality: British

James Bond is a fictional character created by the British novelist Ian Fleming in 1952. The character first appeared in a series of twelve novels and two short story collections written by Fleming and a number of continuation novels and spin-off works after Fleming's death in 1964. Bond's literary portrayal differs in some ways from his treatment in the James Bond films, of which there have been twenty-seven in total, produced and released between 1962 and 2021.

Fleming portrayed Bond as a tall, athletic, handsome secret agent in his thirties or forties. Bond has several vices, including drinking, smoking, gambling, automobiles and womanising. He is an exceptional marksman, and he is skilled in unarmed combat, skiing, swimming and golf. Bond kills without hesitation or regret; he usually kills only when carrying out orders or acting in self-defence, though occasionally for revenge.

Bond was first portrayed on screen by the American actor Barry Nelson, in a 1954 Climax! television adaptation, "Casino Royale". In 1961, Eon Productions began work on an adaptation of the 1958 novel, Dr. No. The result was a film that spawned a series of twenty-five films produced by Eon Productions and two independent films. After considering "refined" English actors such as Cary Grant and David Niven, the producers cast Sean Connery as Bond in the film. Fleming was appalled at the selection of the uncouth 31-year-old Scottish actor, considering him the antithesis of his character. However, Connery's physical prowess and sexual magnetism became closely identified with the character, with Fleming ultimately changing his view on Connery and incorporating aspects of his portrayal into the books.

Seven actors have portrayed Bond in film - Connery, Niven, George Lazenby, Roger Moore, Timothy Dalton, Pierce Brosnan, and Daniel Craig. These screen versions have retained many traits from Fleming's depiction, although some of Bond's less politically correct traits have been phased out (such as his treatment of women and smoking). Despite depicting the same character, there have been notable differences among the Bond portrayals. Connery and Moore have played the character the most times, appearing in seven films each (including Connery's non-Eon film portrayal in 1983's Never Say Never Again).

In November 2026, Robert Pattinson was announced as the eighth actor to portray Bond, beginning with the upcoming 26th film in the Eon series.

== Fleming's literary characterisation ==
A Secret Service agent, James Bond was a composite based on a number of commandos that author Ian Fleming had known during his service in the Naval Intelligence Division during World War II, to whom he added his own style and a number of his own tastes. Fleming appropriated his character's name from the American ornithologist of the same name. Bond's code number 007 (pronounced "double-O[/oʊ/]-seven") comes from one of British naval intelligence's key achievements of World War I: the breaking of the German diplomatic code. One of the German documents cracked and read by the British was the Zimmermann Telegram, which was coded 0075, and which was one of the factors that led to the US entering the war as an ally against the Central Powers. Subsequently, if material was graded 00 it meant it was highly classified. Fleming later told a journalist: "When I was at the Admiralty ... all the top-secret signals had the double-0 prefix ... and I decided to borrow it for Bond."

Although James Bond is in his mid-to-late thirties, he does not age in Fleming's stories. Fleming biographer Andrew Lycett noted that, "within the first few pages [of Casino Royale] Ian had introduced most of Bond's idiosyncrasies and trademarks", which included his looks, his Bentley and his smoking and drinking habits: Bond's penchant for alcohol runs throughout the series of books and he smokes up to 70 cigarettes a day. (Note: The cigarettes Bond smoked were the same as Fleming's, who had been buying his at Morland of Grosvenor Street since the 1930s; the three gold bands on the filter were added during the war to mirror his naval Commander's rank. Fleming himself smoked up to 80 cigarettes a day.)

Fleming decided to underplay Bond's character, observing: "Exotic things would happen to and around him, but he would be a neutral figure." On another occasion, he reinforced his point: "When I wrote the first one in 1953, I wanted Bond to be an extremely dull, uninteresting man to whom things happened; I wanted him to be a blunt instrument."

== Films ==
Timeline of James Bond films

Release timeline
| 1962 | Dr. No |
| 1963 | From Russia with Love |
| 1964 | Goldfinger |
| 1965 | Thunderball |
1966
| 1967 | Casino Royale |
| 1967 | You Only Live Twice |
1968
| 1969 | On Her Majesty's Secret Service |
1970
| 1971 | Diamonds Are Forever |
1972
| 1973 | Live and Let Die |
| 1974 | The Man with the Golden Gun |
1975
1976
| 1977 | The Spy Who Loved Me |
1978
| 1979 | Moonraker |
1980
| 1981 | For Your Eyes Only |
1982
| 1983 | Octopussy |
| 1983 | Never Say Never Again |
1984
| 1985 | A View to a Kill |
1986
| 1987 | The Living Daylights |
1988
| 1989 | Licence to Kill |
1990
1991
1992
1993
1994
| 1995 | GoldenEye |
1996
| 1997 | Tomorrow Never Dies |
1998
| 1999 | The World Is Not Enough |
2000
2001
| 2002 | Die Another Day |
2003
2004
2005
| 2006 | Casino Royale |
2007
| 2008 | Quantum of Solace |
2009
2010
2011
| 2012 | Skyfall |
2013
2014
| 2015 | Spectre |
2016
2017
2018
2019
2020
| 2021 | No Time to Die |
2022
2023
2024
2025
2026
2027
| 2028 | Bond 26 |

=== Sean Connery: 1961–1967, 1970–1971 and 1982–1983 ===
Sean Connery was the first actor to portray Bond in film in Dr. No (1962). A Scottish amateur bodybuilder, he had come to the attention of the Bond film producers after several appearances in British films from the late 1950s. At a muscular 6 ft 2 in (188 cm), Connery was initially met with disapproval from Fleming, who believed he was an overgrown stuntman lacking the finesse and elegance to play James Bond; he envisaged a suave actor, such as David Niven, playing the role. Producer Albert R. Broccoli—known to all as Cubby—disagreed with Fleming's view, later commenting that "I wanted a ballsy guy ... put a bit of veneer over that tough Scottish hide and you've got Fleming's Bond instead of all the mincing poofs we had applying for the job". Eon's choice of Connery was also based on his looks and sex appeal, an appeal that would later be echoed by Honor Blackman (who played Pussy Galore), who said, after appearing with Connery in Goldfinger, "He was exceedingly handsome, virile and sexy and that really was the tenor of what the script was always trying to display". After Connery was chosen, director Terence Young took the actor to his tailor and hairdresser, and introduced him to the high life, restaurants, casinos and women of London. In the words of Bond writer Raymond Benson, Young educated the actor "in the ways of being dapper, witty, and above all, cool".

Connery's interpretation of the character differed considerably from Fleming's, being more promiscuous and cold-blooded than the literary version. Connery described Bond as "a complete sensualist—senses highly tuned, awake to everything, quite amoral. I particularly like him because he thrives on conflict". Academic James Chapman observed that, for Dr. No, Connery's interpretation of the character, although not complete, showed the actor "should be credited with having established a new style of performance: a British screen hero in the manner of an American leading man". In his second film, From Russia with Love, Connery looked less nervous and edgy; he gave "a relaxed, wry performance of subtle wit and style". Pfeiffer and Worrall noted that Connery "personified James Bond with such perfection that even Ian Fleming ... admitted that it was difficult imagining anyone else in the part"; (Note: Fleming later adapted the background of the literary character in You Only Live Twice to have a Scottish heritage, although Fleming himself was part-Scottish. Correspondence dating back to 1960 shows that Fleming contacted a Scottish nobleman to help research Bond's family history, in particular seeking a Scottish Bond line.) academic Jeremy Black agreed, and declared that "Connery made the role his own and created the Bond audience for the cinema". Black also observed that Connery gave the character a "spare, pared-down character ... [with] inner bleakness along with the style". Connery played Bond with "the right mix of cool charisma, violence and arrogance ... against which all others are judged". Raymond Benson perceived that Connery "embodies a ruggedness and an intense screen presence this transcends any preconceived notions about the character". Benson also noted that Bond was witty, but contains "an assured toughness that epitomises the machismo male". Roger Moore agreed with Black and Benson, commenting that "Sean was Bond. He created Bond. He embodied Bond and because of Sean, Bond became an instantly recognisable character the world over—he was rough, tough, mean and witty ... he was a bloody good 007". However, despite his charm and virility, Connery was characteristically laconic in his delivery. Christopher Bray says of him that "in his single-minded, laconic, mocking, self-sufficient vanity, Connery's Bond was the epitome of sixties consumer culture".

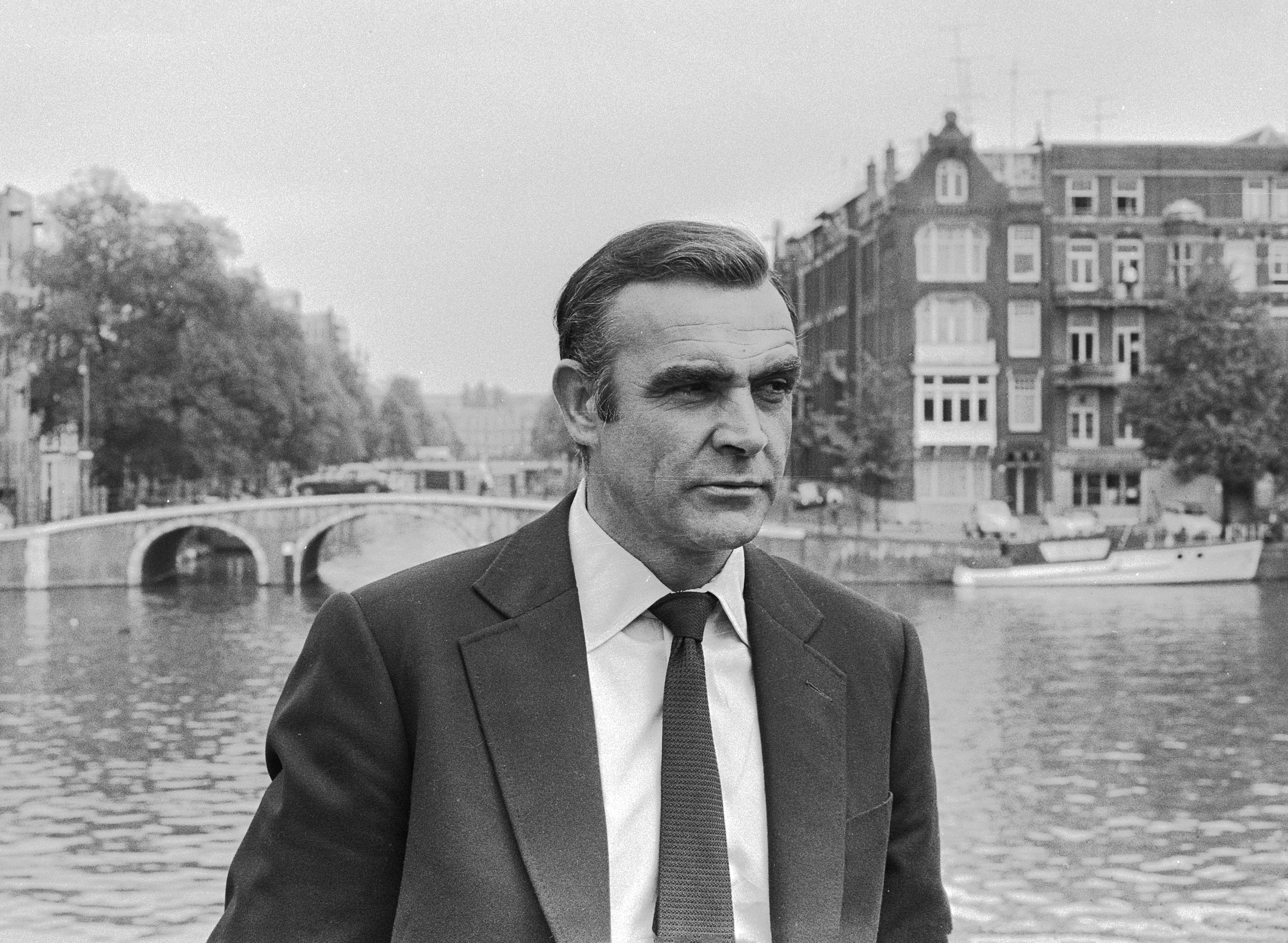
Connery in Amsterdam, July 1971, filming Diamonds Are Forever

Interviewed by Oriana Fallaci in 1965, Connery identified where he had altered the character for the films, saying "I said to the producers that the character had one defect, there was no humor about him; to get him accepted, they'd have to let me play him tongue-in-cheek, so people could laugh. They agreed, and there you are: today Bond is accepted to such an extent that even philosophers take the trouble to analyze him, even intellectuals enjoy defending him or attacking him. And even while they're laughing at him, people take him terribly seriously". Connery went on to add that "Bond is important: this invincible superman that every man would like to copy, that every woman would like to conquer, this dream we all have of survival. And then one can't help liking him". After the pressures of five films in six years, Connery left the role after the 1967 film You Only Live Twice saying, "It became a terrible pressure, like living in a goldfish bowl ... that was part of the reason I wanted to be finished with Bond. Also I had become completely identified with it, and it became very wearing and very boring".

After a hiatus of one film—On Her Majesty's Secret Service, in which George Lazenby played Bond—Connery returned to the role for Diamonds Are Forever after David V. Picker, the head of United Artists, made it clear that Connery was to be enticed back to the role and that money was no object. When approached about resuming the role of Bond, Connery demanded—and received—a fee of £1.25 million (£23 million in 2025 pounds), 12.5% of the gross profits and, as a further enticement, United Artists offered to back two films of his choice. (Note: After both sides agreed to the deal, Connery used the fee to establish the Scottish International Education Trust, where Scottish artists could apply for funding without having to leave their country to pursue their careers. Given that John Gavin, who had been signed to play Bond, was no longer required, Broccoli insisted that he be paid in full. The first film made under Connery's deal was The Offence, directed by his friend Sidney Lumet. The second was to be an adaptation of Macbeth by William Shakespeare using only Scottish actors and in which Connery himself would play the title role. This project was abandoned because another production of Macbeth (the Roman Polanski version) was already in production.) His performance received mixed reviews, with Raymond Benson considering that Connery "looks weary and bored ... he is overweight, slow-moving, and doesn't seem to be trying to create a credible character". Despite that, Benson considers that Connery "still radiates more screen presence than Roger Moore or George Lazenby". On the other hand, Pauline Kael said "Connery's James Bond is less lecherous than before and less foppish—and he's better this way".

Producer Jack Schwartzman moved ahead with a non-Eon Bond film in the early 1980s, following the controversy over the 1961 novel Thunderball and the subsequent long legal battle; the result was Never Say Never Again. Connery accepted an offer to play Bond once more, asking for (and receiving) a fee of $3 million ($10 million in 2025 dollars), a percentage of the profits, as well as casting, director and script approval. The script has several references to Bond's advancing years, playing on Connery being 52 years of age at the time of filming. David Robinson, reviewing the film for The Times, considered that "Connery ... is back, looking hardly a day older or thicker, and still outclassing every other exponent of the role, in the goodnatured throwaway with which he parries all the sex and violence on the way". In 2003, Bond, as portrayed by Connery, was selected as the third-greatest hero in cinema history by the American Film Institute.

Sean Connery as James Bond in:
| Year | Film | Salary $ (millions) |
|---|---|---|
| 1962 | Dr. No | 0.1 (Note: Balio sets Connery's compensation for Dr. No at $154,000: $54,000 as salary and $100,000 as a bonus.) |
| 1963 | From Russia with Love | 0.3 |
| 1964 | Goldfinger | 0.5 |
| 1965 | Thunderball | 0.8 |
| 1967 | You Only Live Twice | 0.8 + 25% net merchandise royalty |
| 1971 | Diamonds Are Forever | 1.2 + 12.5% of gross (Note: Balio claims Connery was paid a straight 12.5% of the gross. Diamonds Are Forever grossed $42 million in distributor rentals (i.e. the distributor's cut of the box-office gross), so Connery received over $5 million, from which he gave $1.25 million to the Scottish International Education Trust.) |
| 1983 | Never Say Never Again (Non-Eon) | 3.0 + unknown % of profits |

=== David Niven: 1967 ===
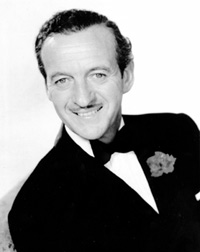
David Niven starred in the 1967 film Casino Royale

When Sean Connery had been cast in November 1961, David Niven had been Fleming's choice for the role; the actor reflected the author's image of the character. In 1965 producer Charles Feldman signed Niven to play Sir James Bond for Casino Royale, a film not made by Eon Productions. Connery and Peter Sellers had both turned down the role. Niven was 56 when he played Bond and his characterisation was that of an elderly man who had won the Victoria Cross at the siege of Mafeking, had a daughter by his lover, the spy Mata Hari, played Claude Debussy on the piano, ate royal jelly and cultivated black roses. The concept of Bond is that once Niven's Bond retired, his name and 007 designation was passed to another agent to keep the legend alive; James Chapman notes that the implication was that the "other Bond" was that played by Connery.

Chapman considered the concept of an elderly Bond interesting, with Bond referring to Connery's Bond as a "sexual acrobat who leaves a trail of beautiful dead women behind like blown roses". In line with the literary Bond, Niven's character drives a vintage Bentley, rather than the Aston Martin favoured by Connery. Bond scholar Steven Jay Rubin thought Niven perfectly cast as the retired Bond, and saw him as "a throw-back to the hell-for-leather adventure heroes" of the character, which paralleled Niven's own life and career. Barnes and Hearn describe this as a "perfectly fair interpretation", given the way Niven approached the role, while Raymond Benson thinks casting Niven was "intelligent". Jeremy Black questioned the use of Niven in the role, observing that he did not seem to be a killer, and did not have the "disconcerting edge" that Connery had.

David Niven as James Bond in:
| Year | Film | Salary $ (millions) |
|---|---|---|
| 1967 | Casino Royale (Non-Eon) | Unknown |

=== George Lazenby: 1968–1969 ===
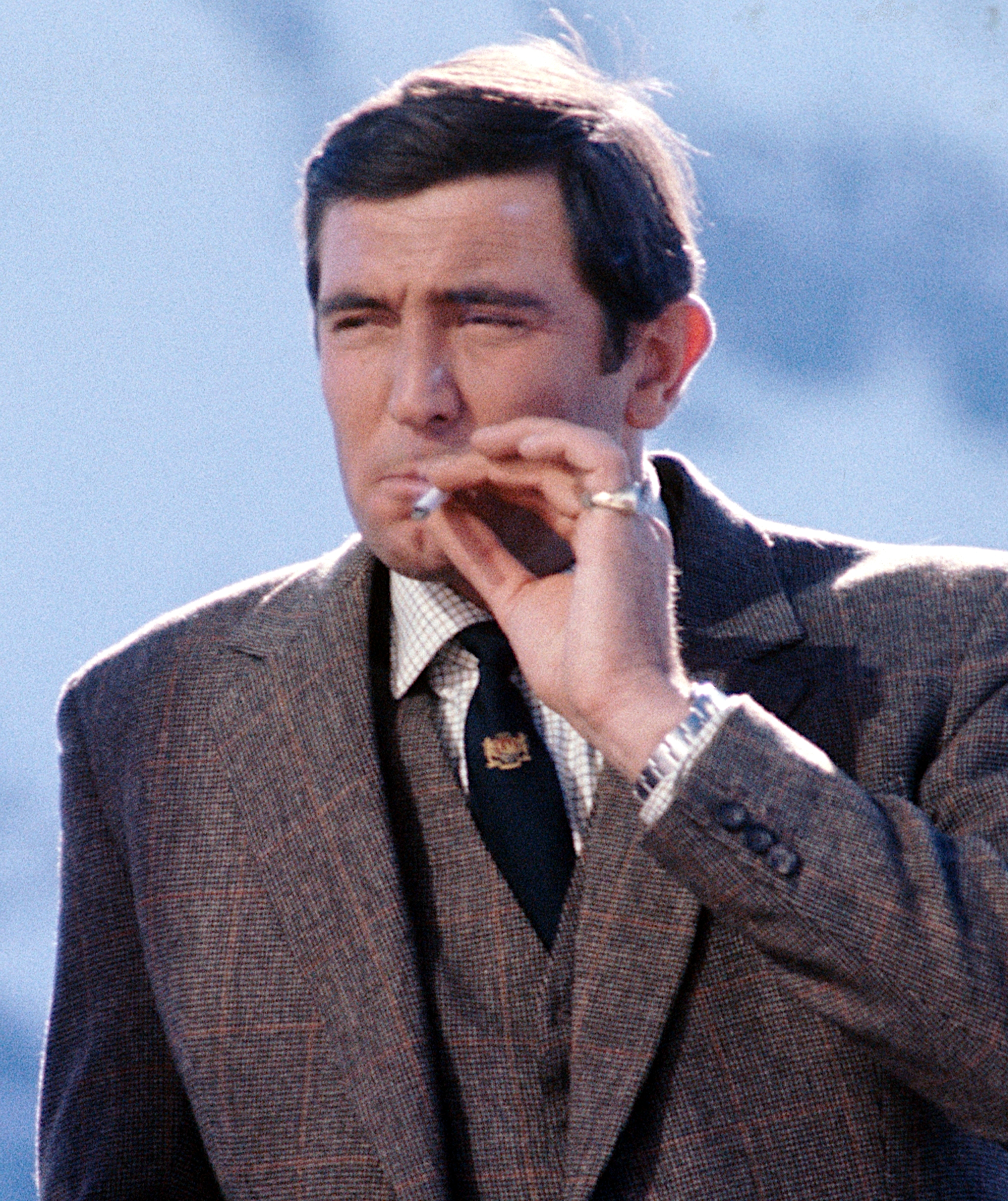
Australian actor George Lazenby in On Her Majesty's Secret Service

With the departure of Connery after You Only Live Twice (1967), Broccoli and director Peter R. Hunt chose little-known Australian actor George Lazenby (born 1939), to be the third major actor (following Sean Connery and David Niven) to play the role of Bond. He first came to their attention in a Fry's Chocolate Cream advertisement. Lazenby dressed the part by sporting several sartorial Bond elements such as a Rolex Submariner wristwatch and a Savile Row suit (ordered, but uncollected, by Connery), and going to Connery's barber at the Dorchester Hotel in London. Lazenby consolidated his claim during a screen test, when he accidentally punched a professional wrestler, who was acting as stunt coordinator, in the face, impressing Broccoli with his ability to display aggression. Lazenby never signed a contract, with negotiations dragging on during production, and he was subsequently convinced by his agent Ronan O'Rahilly that the secret agent character image would be archaic in the liberated 1970s; as a result he left the role of Agent 007 even before the release of On Her Majesty's Secret Service in 1969. For his performance as Bond, Lazenby was nominated for the Golden Globe Award for New Star of the Year – Actor at the following year's 27th Golden Globe Awards in February 1970.

Critical opinion was split about Lazenby; he has been considered to have been the worst Bond, and has variously been described as "laconic and humourless", "a little stiff" and "annoying and smug". Derek Malcolm of The Guardian was dismissive of Lazenby's performance, saying that he "is not a good actor and though I never thought Sean Connery was all that stylish either, there are moments when one yearns for a little of his louche panache". The New York Times critic AH Weiler also weighed in against Lazenby, saying that "Lazenby, if not a spurious Bond, is merely a casual, pleasant, satisfactory replacement". Pauline Kael called Lazenby "quite a dull fellow" in her otherwise positive review in The New Yorker magazine. However, Peter R. Hunt, director of On Her Majesty's Secret Service, stated that Lazenby should have undertaken more films in the role, saying "he would have made a very credible Bond and been very good indeed".

Smith and Lavington consider that Lazenby "had chosen to play Bond the same way as Sean Connery had, with perhaps more humility and humanity"; they went on to say that "Lazenby's inexperience rarely shows" in the film, and that "he invariably rises to the occasion". Alexander Walker in the Evening Standard of London, said that, "The truth is that George Lazenby is almost as good a James Bond as the man whom he humorously referred to in this film as 'this never happened to the other fellow'?!. Lazenby's voice is more suave than sexy-sinister and he could pass for the other fellow's twin on the shady side of the casino. Bond is now definitely all set for the Seventies". Judith Crist of New York Magazine commented that, "This time around there's less suavity and a no-nonsense muscularity and maleness to the role via the handsome Mr. Lazenby". Feminist film critic Molly Haskell wrote an approving review in the Village Voice: "Lazenby ... seems more comfortable in a wet tuxedo than a dry martini, more at ease as a donnish genealogist than reading (or playing) Playboy magazine, and who actually dares to think that one woman who is his equal is better than a thousand part-time playmates".

James Chapman considers that Lazenby looks the part of Bond, identifying his athleticism and "arrogant swagger", which "convey the snobbery of the character". Chapman also distinguished a more vulnerable and human characterisation in Bond—feeling exhausted and falling in love—as opposed to the "heroic superman" of Connery. Brian Fairbanks noted that "OHMSS gives us a James Bond capable of vulnerability, a man who can show fear and is not immune to heartbreak. Lazenby is that man, and his performance is superb". Ben Macintyre also observed that of all the Bonds, Lazenby's characterisation was closest to that of Fleming's original literary character envisioned in the 1950s era of spy novels.

George Lazenby as James Bond in:
| Year | Film | Salary $ (millions dollars) |
|---|---|---|
| 1969 | On Her Majesty's Secret Service | 0.1 |

=== Roger Moore: 1972–1985 ===
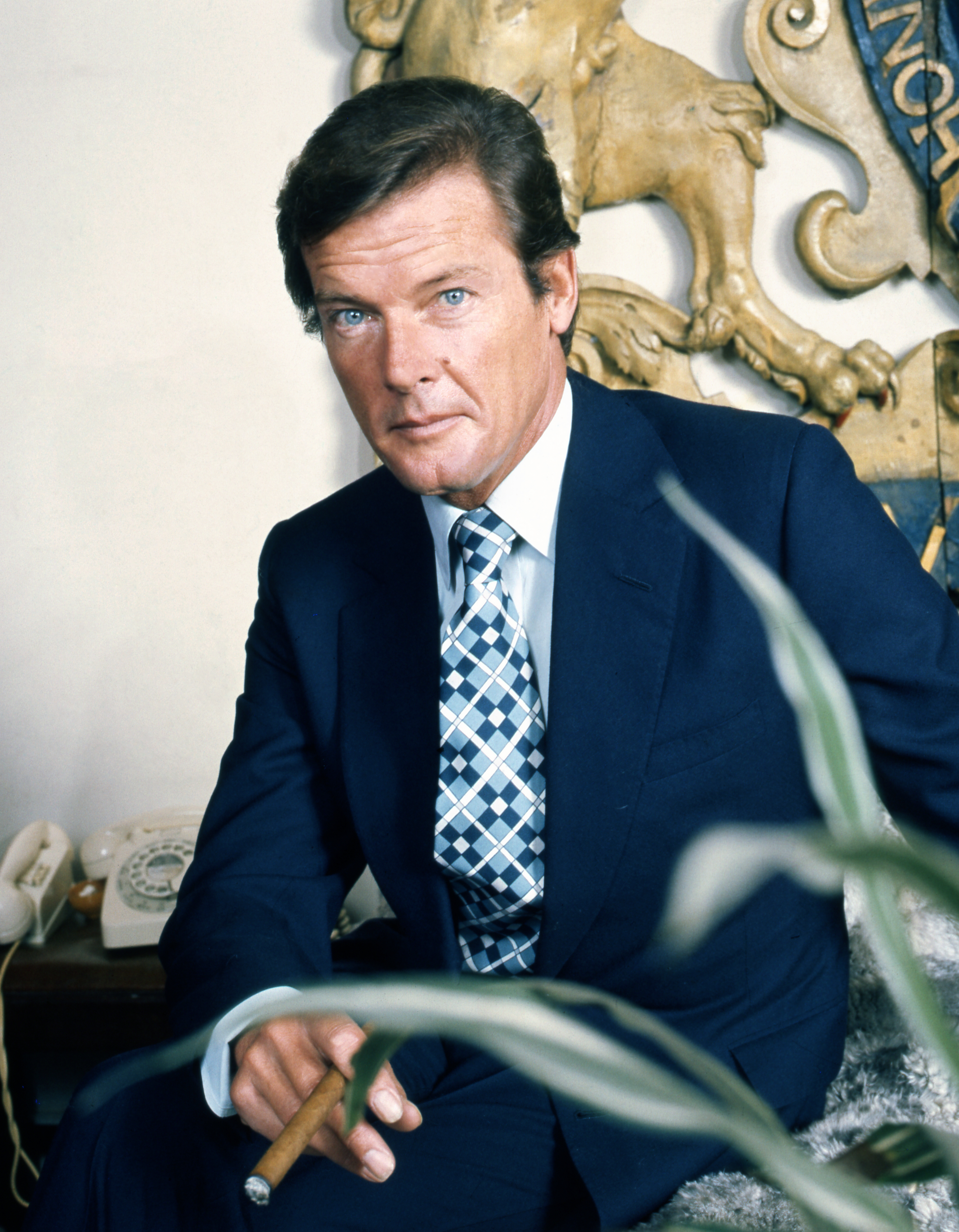
Roger Moore in 1973, photographed by Allan Warren

After Diamonds Are Forever, Broccoli and Saltzman tried to convince Sean Connery to return as Bond, but he declined. After considering Jeremy Brett, Michael Billington and Julian Glover, the two producers finally turned to Roger Moore, whom they had previously discussed for On Her Majesty's Secret Service, but who had been unavailable, and he was ultimately cast to play Bond in Live and Let Die. At the time Moore was an established television actor, known for his performances as Simon Templar in The Saint and Lord Brett Sinclair in The Persuaders!, in both of which he played a "charming, debonair, international playboy". When playing Bond, Moore tried not to imitate either Connery or his previous roles, and screenwriter Tom Mankiewicz fitted the screenplay around Moore's persona by giving more comedy scenes and a light-hearted feel to Bond, an approach that led Raymond Benson to describe Moore's Bond as "a rather smarmy, eyebrow-raising international playboy who never seemed to get hurt".

Film writer Andrew Spicer considered Roger Moore the most elegant and mannerly of the Bonds, with the voice and style of an English debonair country gentleman. Benson agreed, stating that Moore was, "too nice and well-mannered to be a James Bond of any real substance", while Doug Pratt said that "the writers worked out an amenable personality for Roger Moore and found a breezy balance between comedy and action". To make Moore's character appear tougher, a Smith & Wesson .44 Magnum — which at the time was associated with the macho image of the Clint Eastwood character, Dirty Harry — was chosen for Moore to use in Live and Let Die rather than Bond's usual choice of Walther PPK.

Spicer says "Roger Moore re-created Bond as an old-style debonair hero, more polished and sophisticated than Connery's incarnation, using the mocking insouciance he had perfected in his role as Simon Templar ... Moore's humour was a throwaway, and certainly in the later films, verged on self-parody. It was an essential strand in the increasingly tongue-in-cheek direction of the series which became more light-hearted, knowing and playfully intertextual". Chapman noted that Moore was the most comedic of the Bonds, with a more light-hearted approach to playing the character with a mocking wit and innuendo. Additionally, Moore's one-liners were delivered in a way to suggest that the violence inherent in the films was a joke, as opposed to Connery's, which was used to mitigate the violence. Moore explained his approach to the humour by saying "to me, the Bond situations are so ridiculous ... I mean, this man is supposed to be a spy, and yet everybody knows he's a spy ... it's outrageous. So you have to treat the humour outrageously as well".

Pauline Kael was a fairly vocal critic of Moore's, dismissing him as an "iceberg" in The Man with the Golden Gun. In reviewing For Your Eyes Only, she said that Moore's "idea of Bond's imperturbable cool is the same as playing dead". Reviewing Moonraker, she wrote "Roger Moore is dutiful and passive as Bond; his clothes are neatly pressed and he shows up for work, like an office manager who is turning into dead wood but hanging on to collect his pension". Only in The Spy Who Loved Me, one of Kael's favourite Bond films, did she praise him, describing him as self-effacing: "Moore gets the chance to look scared—an emotion that suits him and makes him more likable".

A number of Moore's personal preferences were transferred into his characterisation of Bond: his taste for Cuban cigars and his wearing of safari suits were assigned to the character. Moore's use of cigars in his early films put him in contrast to the cigarette-smoking Connery, Lazenby and Dalton. By the time of Moore's fifth film, For Your Eyes Only, released in 1981, his characterisation had come to represent an old-fashioned character, in contrast to the fashionability Connery had brought to the role in the 1960s.

In 1985 Moore appeared in his seventh and final film, A View to a Kill; he was 57 (he appeared alongside co-star Tanya Roberts, who was 30). Critics focused on Moore's age: The Washington Post said "Moore isn't just long in the tooth – he's got tusks, and what looks like an eye job has given him the pie-eyed blankness of a zombie. He's not believable anymore in the action sequences, even less so in the romantic scenes". When he was cast for the film, Moore recalled that he felt "a bit long in the tooth", and in December 2007 admitted that he "was only about four hundred years too old for the part". Like Connery, Moore appeared as Bond in seven films; by the time he retired in 1985, he was the oldest actor to play 007 in the Eon series, and his Bond films had earned over $1 billion at the box office.

Roger Moore as James Bond in:
| Year | Film | Salary $ (millions) |
|---|---|---|
| 1973 | Live and Let Die | 0.18 |
| 1974 | The Man with the Golden Gun | 0.24 + 2.5% |
| 1977 | The Spy Who Loved Me | 0.3 + 3.75% |
| 1979 | Moonraker | Unknown |
| 1981 | For Your Eyes Only | Unknown |
| 1983 | Octopussy | 4.0 |
| 1985 | A View to a Kill | 5.0 |

=== Timothy Dalton: 1986–1994 ===
With the retirement of Roger Moore in 1985, a search for a new actor to play Bond took place that saw a number of actors, including Sam Neill, Pierce Brosnan and Timothy Dalton, audition for the role in 1986. Bond co-producer Michael G. Wilson, director John Glen, Dana and Barbara Broccoli "were impressed with Sam Neill and very much wanted to use him", although Bond producer Albert R. Broccoli was not sold on the actor. Dalton and Brosnan were both considered by Eon, but after Brosnan was eventually ruled out by his Remington Steele contract, Dalton was appointed in August 1986 on a salary of $5.2 million. When he was either 24 or 25 years old Dalton had discussed playing Bond with Broccoli, but decided he was too young to accept the role, thinking Bond should be portrayed as being between 35 and 40 years old. In preparing for the role, Dalton, a green-eyed, dark haired, slender, 6 ft 2 in (188 cm) classically trained Shakespearean actor, was keen to portray the character as accurately as possible, reading up extensively on the books before his role in The Living Daylights (1987).

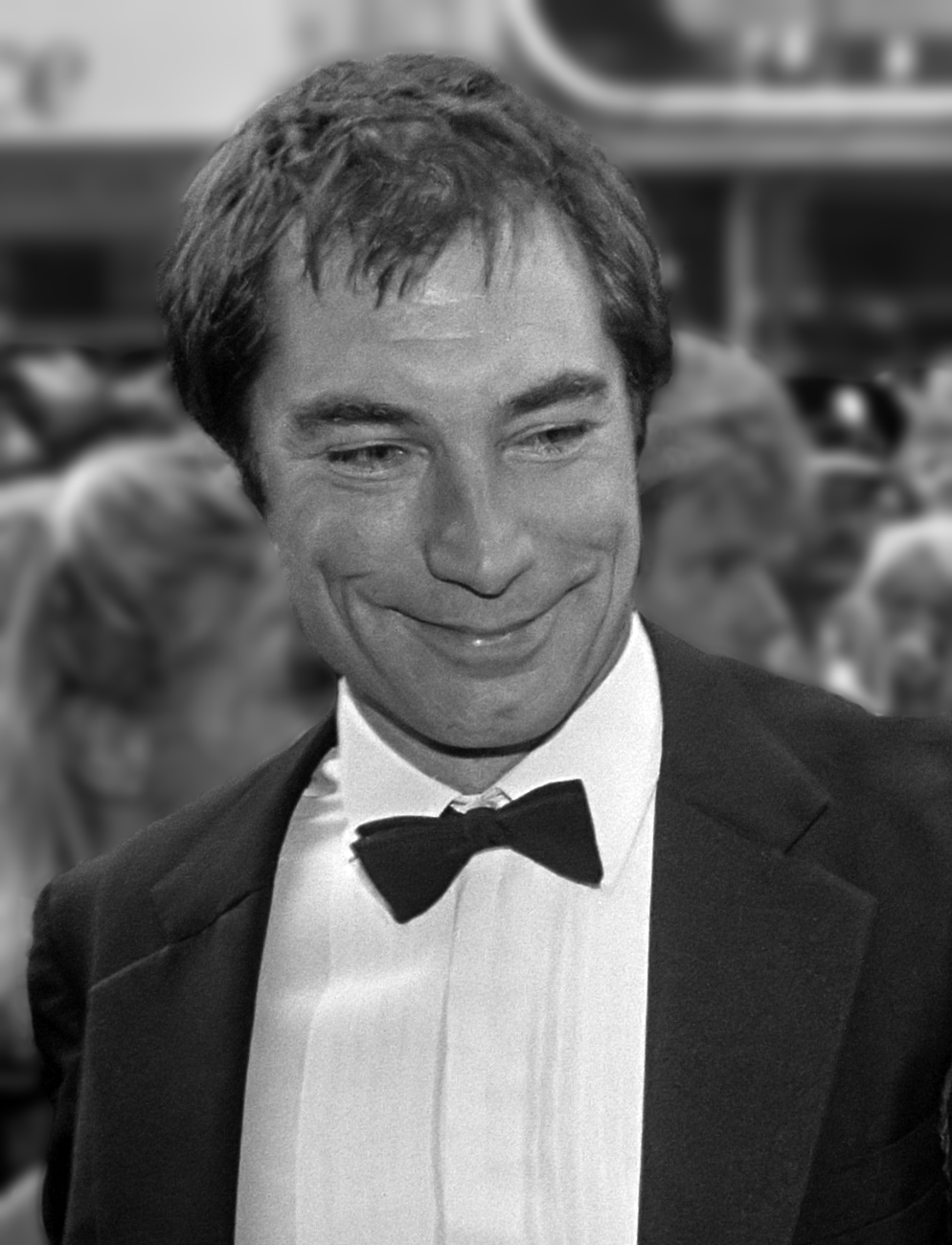
Timothy Dalton played Bond twice, in 1987 and 1989

Dalton's Bond was a serious one: dark, cold, stern, ruthless, showing little humour, and focused as a killer with little time for fun and indulgence. Dalton's interpretation of the character came from his "desire to see a darker Bond", one that was "less of a womaniser, tougher and closer to the darker character Ian Fleming wrote about". James Chapman also considered Dalton closer to Fleming's Bond than the previous actors, writing that Dalton was "clearly less comfortable ... with the witty asides and one-liners ... so he becomes something closer to the Bond of the books, who rarely develops a sense of humour". When reviewing Licence to Kill, Iain Johnstone of The Sunday Times disagreed, declaring that "any vestiges of the gentleman spy ... by Ian Fleming" have now gone; he went on to say that "this character is remarkably close both in deed and action to the eponymous hero of the new Batman film".

Not all viewers were taken with Dalton. Jay Scott of The Globe and Mail was entirely dismissive. "The new Bond has been widely described in feature stories as a throwback to the Ian Fleming original (studying the Fleming novels, Dalton was pleased to discover that Bond was a human being, he says), and that may be true, if the Fleming original lacked charm, sex appeal and wit. Timothy Dalton's Bond is a serious bloke who swallows his words and approaches his job with responsibility and humanity, and eschews promiscuity – Dirtless Harry. You get the feeling that on his off nights, he might curl up with the Reader's Digest and catch an episode of Moonlighting – he'd try to memorize the jokes – before nodding off under the influence of Ovaltine. The British reviews of The Living Daylights have been laudatory, perhaps because this Bond is the most British of all, if British is to be understood as a synonym for reserved".

Raymond Benson noted that Dalton "purposely played Bond as a ruthless and serious man with very little of the wit displayed by Connery, Lazenby or Moore", and considered him "the most accurate and literal interpretation of the role ... ever seen on screen". His character also reflected a degree of moral ambiguity; in Licence to Kill, for instance, he becomes a rogue agent, while Dalton himself saw the character as a "man, not a superhuman; a man who is beset with moral confusions and apathies and uncertainties, and who is often very frightened and nervous and tense". Smith and Lavington observed that during Dalton's portrayal in Licence to Kill, Bond appeared "self-absorbed ... reckless, brutal, prone to nervous laughter and ... probably insane, or at least seriously disturbed. In the light of Licence to Kill, one academic, Martin Willis, referred to Dalton's Bond as a "muscular vigilante". Steven Jay Rubin noted that Dalton's films had "a hard-edged reality and some unflinching violent episodes that were better suited to Dalton's more realistic approach to the character". Rubin considered Dalton's portrayal "Fleming's Bond ... the suffering Bond". In contrast to the previous incarnations of the character, Smith and Lavington identified Dalton's humour as "brooding rather than flippant"; combined with his heavy smoking, they considered him "an effective leading man". Although Bond screenwriter Richard Maibaum called Sean Connery the best Bond, he considered Dalton the best actor of the four he worked with. Screenwriter Tom Mankiewicz agreed with this view, praising Dalton's "androgynous... and evil" screen persona. Director John Glen also felt that Dalton was the best actor who portrayed Bond, and that he was ahead of his time, noting the comparisons between Daniel Craig's incarnation to that of Dalton's. Dalton was voted the second-best Bond, behind Connery, in a publicly conducted poll by Radio Times in anticipation to the 25th Bond film, No Time to Die. Dalton's films did not perform as well at the box office as most of the previous films. Commentators such as Screen International considered the Bond series had run its course in the age of series such as Indiana Jones and Lethal Weapon. Edward P. Comentale observed that "Dalton, for all his occasional flat northern vowels, was probably too much the stage actor to be convincing as an action hero in the age of Willis, Schwarzenegger and Stallone". After just two films—The Living Daylights and Licence to Kill—litigation ensued over the licensing of the Bond catalogue, delaying what would have been Dalton's third film by several years. His six-year contract expired in 1993 and he left the series in 1994.

Timothy Dalton as James Bond in:
| Year | Film | Salary $ (millions) |
|---|---|---|
| 1987 | The Living Daylights | 3.0 |
| 1989 | Licence to Kill | 5.0 |

=== Pierce Brosnan: 1994–2004 ===
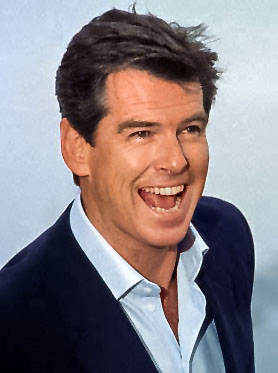
Pierce Brosnan at the 2002 Cannes Film Festival

After Timothy Dalton retired from the Bond role in 1994, Eon turned to the actor they had considered after A View to a Kill: Pierce Brosnan. He was offered a three-film contract, with an option on a fourth; his salary for his first film, GoldenEye, was $4 million, which rose to $16.5 million for his fourth and final outing, Die Another Day. Brosnan had first met Broccoli on the set of For Your Eyes Only, when Brosnan's wife, Cassandra Harris, was appearing in the film as Countess Lisl von Schlaf, and the couple lunched with Broccoli during filming. Brosnan went on to play a criminal-turned-private investigator in Remington Steele in the 1980s, where he captured some of the traits of previous Bonds in playing the role: like Moore, he exemplified a high degree of suavity, elegance, charm and wit, but displayed a masculinity and grittiness on occasion reminiscent of Connery's Bond, both successfully "combine the character's Englishness with a classless internationalism that is highly knowing". Andrew Spicer says that "Brosnan's frame carries the 'Armani look' with its refined understated Englishness, to perfection. His lithe, sinuous athleticism is well suited to the fast-paced action and state-of-the-art gadgetry that retains the series' core appeal". James Chapman also considered Brosnan's appearance striking, saying the actor had "old-fashioned, darkly handsome matinee idol looks".

With Brosnan, the Bond writers knew that because of the changes in public attitudes, he could not be as overtly sexual and dominant over women as Connery's Bond, and was denounced by M in GoldenEye as a "sexist, misogynist dinosaur, a relic of the Cold War". Brosnan was seen by many as the quintessential James Bond in appearance and manner; displaying an air of coolness, elegance and a grace which made him believable as an international playboy, if not purely as an assassin. John G. Stackhouse, for instance, argues that it is preposterous that any man as strikingly handsome as Brosnan, or Connery, could be a secret agent, saying, "When Sean Connery or Pierce Brosnan enters a room, everyone notices. Thus it is ridiculous to suppose that James Bond, looking like that, could be a secret agent for longer than about two seconds".

Brosnan's Bond was introduced in GoldenEye; James Chapman argues that the film works his portrayal of Bond into the history of the others in the series through the post-credits sequence use of the Aston Martin DB5, previously seen in Goldfinger and Thunderball, "thus immediately evoking the memory of [Sean] Connery". Brosnan's characterisation of Bond was seen by Jeremy Black as being "closer to the Fleming novels than Moore ... yet he is also lighter and less intense than Dalton". Black also commented that the shift in character in the first three films reflected changing social opinions, with Bond not smoking. Brosnan was clear he wanted to change Bond's smoking habit, saying "I don't give a damn about everyone's perception of the character: I think smoking causes cancer therefore he doesn't smoke", although he did smoke a Cuban cigar in Die Another Day. Brosnan continued with the use of humour prevalent with other portrayals, and provided a "mix of action and danger threaded through with the right amount of wit and humour"; Smith and Lavington saw the humour largely as puns that were "flippant, but not crass".

After four films in the role, Brosnan stated he wished to do one final Bond film. Although plans were made for a film to be released in 2004, negotiations stalled and Brosnan announced his intention to leave the franchise in July 2004.

Pierce Brosnan as James Bond in:
| Year | Film | Salary $ (millions) |
|---|---|---|
| 1995 | GoldenEye | 4.0 |
| 1997 | Tomorrow Never Dies | 8.2 |
| 1999 | The World Is Not Enough | 12.4 |
| 2002 | Die Another Day | 16.5 |

=== Daniel Craig: 2005–2021 ===
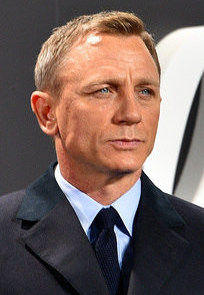
Daniel Craig at the Berlin premiere of Spectre in October 2015

On 14 October 2005, Eon Productions, Metro-Goldwyn-Mayer and Sony Pictures Entertainment introduced at a press conference in London Daniel Craig as the sixth actor to portray Bond in the Eon series. A tuxedo- and lifejacket-clad Craig arrived via a Royal Navy speedboat. Craig accepted the role based on the strength of the script for Casino Royale; he later recalled that "once I sat down and read the story, I just thought that I wanted to tell [it] ... I'm a big Bond fan, and I love what he represents". Significant controversy followed the decision, with some critics and fans expressing doubt the producers had made the right choice. Throughout the entire production period, Internet campaigns such as danielcraigisnotbond.com expressed their dissatisfaction and threatened to boycott the film in protest. Craig, unlike previous actors, was not considered by the protesters to fit the tall, dark, handsome and charismatic image of Bond to which viewers had been accustomed. Many disparagingly called him "James Blonde", believing the 5 ft 10 in (1.78 m) blond-haired, blue-eyed Craig far from the traditional tall, dark and suave actors who had earlier portrayed him. The Daily Mirror ran a front-page news story critical of Craig, with the headline, The Name's Bland – James Bland.

Craig first played Bond in the 2006 film Casino Royale, an adaptation of Fleming's novel of the same name and a reboot of the Eon series, which saw Bond earn his 00 status. Despite the negative press on his appointment, Craig was widely praised by critics and former Bonds after the release of the film, many of whom believed he was the first actor to truly nail the character as portrayed by Fleming. Todd McCarthy, reviewing the film for Variety, considered that "Craig comes closer to the author's original conception of this exceptionally long-lived male fantasy figure than anyone since early Sean Connery", and he went on to say that "Craig once and for all claims the character as his own". Steven Spielberg, who had directed Craig in the 2005 film Munich, called him "the perfect 21st-century Bond". Paul Arendt, writing for the BBC, agreed, observing that "Daniel Craig is not a good Bond. He's a great Bond. Specifically, he is 007 as conceived by Ian Fleming—a professional killing machine, a charming, cold-hearted patriot with a taste for luxury. Craig is the first actor to really nail 007's defining characteristic: he's an absolute swine". James Chapman commented on the realism and violence in the film, noting that Bond is seen to seriously bleed for the first time in the series; Chapman also identified a number of violent scenes which make Casino Royale notable in the series. In 2012 Skyfall was released; it was Craig's third outing as 007. Reviewing the film, Philip French, writing in The Observer, considered that Craig managed to "get out of the shadow of Connery", while the New Statesman thought that he had "relaxed into Bond without losing any steeliness".

Following the release of No Time to Die (2021), his fifth film as Bond, Craig retired from the role.

Daniel Craig as James Bond in:
| Year | Film | Salary $ (millions) |
|---|---|---|
| 2006 | Casino Royale | 3.4 |
| 2008 | Quantum of Solace | 8.9 |
| 2012 | Skyfall | 17 |
| 2015 | Spectre | 39 |
| 2021 | No Time to Die | 25 |

=== Robert Pattinson: 2026–present ===
Robert Pattinson in 2026

On 16 November 2026, Amazon MGM announced via social media that Robert Pattinson would become the eighth actor to portray Bond. Production of the next film is expected to begin in 2027 and set for release in 2028.
