= The Battle for Bond =

Book by Robert Sellers

The Battle for Bond – The Genesis of Cinema's Greatest Hero
- Author: Robert Sellers
- Language: English
- Subject: Film
- Genre: Non-fiction
- Publisher: Tomahawk Press Publishers
- Publication date: 1 July 2007
- Publication place: United Kingdom
- Media type: Print (paperback)
- Pages: 264 pp (first edition); 272 pp (second edition)
- ISBN: 0-9531926-3-6 (Tomahawk press)
- OCLC: 154708298

The Battle for Bond (2007), by Robert Sellers, is a cinema history book of how the literary character James Bond metamorphosed to the cinema James Bond. The book details the collaboration among film producer Kevin McClory, novelist Ian Fleming, screenwriter Jack Whittingham and others to create the film Thunderball.

After the film project's collapse, without his collaborators' permission, Fleming based his Thunderball (1961) novel upon their joint work. In 1963 McClory and Whittingham sued him for plagiarism. The Battle for Bond concerns the court case.

Kevin McClory won the film rights and chose a single co-production deal with Harry Saltzman and Albert R. Broccoli: Thunderball (1965) that was released at Christmas. McClory's court victory also entitled him to remake Thunderball (1965) as Never Say Never Again (1983), again with Sean Connery as James Bond, the cinematic competition Broccoli had tried to legally ban. With the remake, McClory attempted to continue with his own James Bond film series, but was stopped after legal action by Broccoli and MGM. In a later unsuccessful lawsuit, McClory went further and now claimed that he created the cinematic James Bond, and demanded a share of the three billion dollars earned by the official Eon film series.

== Legal ban of the first edition ==
The book features unpublished letters, private lawsuit documents and cast-crew interviews; there are also five Thunderball screenplays, two by Ian Fleming, three by Jack Whittingham, and two treatments by Fleming that document the creation and development of this James Bond project. The Ian Fleming estate, the Ian Fleming Will Trust, protested the inclusion of several Fleming letters in the book, which it said were used without permission. The book was subsequently withdrawn and unsold copies sent to the estate for disposal.

The publisher, Tomahawk Press, later published a second edition without the letters, which it claimed were not fundamental to the story.

== See also ==
- Outline of James Bond
