= Saskia Cohen-Tanugi =

French actress (1959–2020)

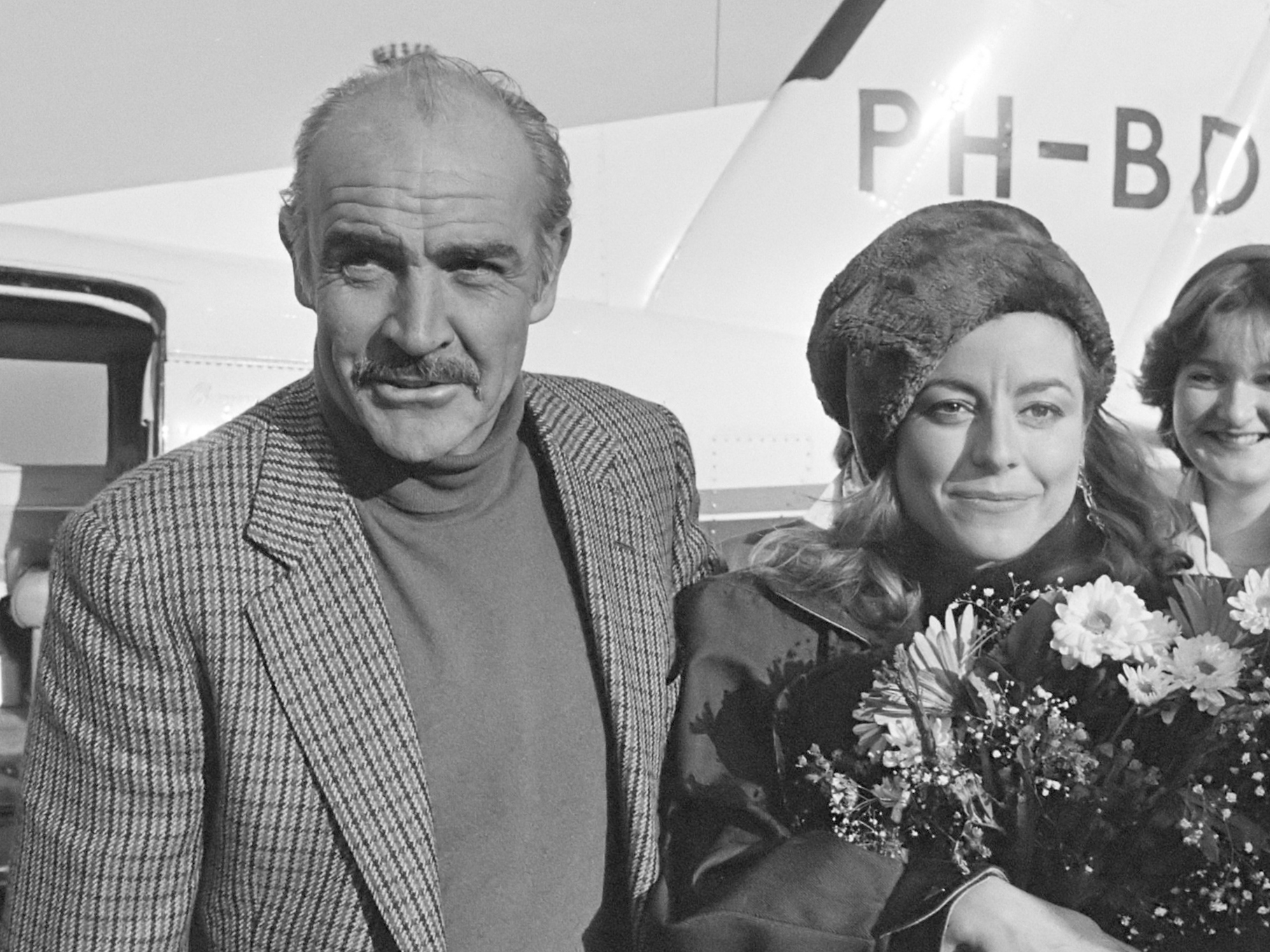
- Cohen-Tanugi (right) and Sean Connery in 1983
- Born: 24 November 1958; Tunis, Tunisia
- Died: 20 July 2020 (aged 61–62); Jerusalem, Israel
- Occupation: Theatre director

Saskia Cohen-Tanugi (24 November 1958 – 20 July 2020) was a Tunisian-born French theatre director, actress, educator, and arts administrator.

== Early life and education ==
Cohen-Tanugi was born to a Jewish family in Tunis, and attended Hebrew University of Jerusalem and the Sorbonne. She studied under Antoine Vitez at the National Conservatory of Dramatic Art in Paris.

== Career ==
Cohen-Tanugi was a theatrical director. Her 1983 production of The Merchant of Venice in Paris was described as "débordante, consolante, convaincante" ("overflowing, consoling, convincing") by one critic, who also admired the show's punk-inspired costumes. She appeared onstage in Frédéric Klepper's 1985 production of Marivaux's The Triumph of Love, as Princess Phocion. She translated and adapted Keter Malchut, a recitation by 11th-century poet Solomon ibn Gabirol, from Hebrew into French, as L'Orage et la Prière; Jean-Michel Dupuis performed her adaptation in Paris in 1997.

She acted in several films, including Never Say Never Again (1983), and wrote others, including Le Maître des Éléphants (The Elephant Master, 1996), with director Patrick Grandperret. She told interviewers that much of her role in Never Say Never Again was cut in the editing process, including a fight scene with Barbara Carrera.

Cohen-Tanugi taught at the Chaillot National Theatre School in Paris for several years; one of her students there was actor David Friszman. She directed an arts festival in New Caledonia in 1989, and programmed an arts festival in Paris from 1995 to 1999. In her last years, she lived in Israel, where she ran a theatre workshop and directed productions at Hebrew University.

She died in Jerusalem in 2020.

== Filmography ==
=== Actress ===
- Le Faucon (1983) as Carmen
- Never Say Never Again (1983) as Nicole
- Réveillon chez Bob (1984)
- 7P., cuis, s. de b...(à saisir) (1984, directed by Agnès Varda)

=== Screenwriting ===
- Veraz (1991)
- Little Buddha (1993)
- Le Maître des éléphants (1995)

== Theatre directing ==
- The Merchant of Venice (1983)
- Docteur X Hero ou le dernier client du Ritz (1984)
- Bastien und Bastienne (1987)
- Bréviaire d'amour d'un haltérophile (1987)
