= Danjaq =

Company that holds the materials related to James Bond

Danjaq, LLC
- Type: Holding company
- Industry: Entertainment; Film
- Founded: 1962; 64 years ago
- Founders: Albert R. Broccoli; Harry Saltzman
- Successor: London Operations, LLC (Note: Joint venture between Amazon MGM Studios and the Broccoli Family.)
- Headquarters: Santa Monica, California, United States
- Key people: Michael G. Wilson; Barbara Broccoli
- Products: James Bond films (before 2025)
- Owners: Michael G. Wilson; Barbara Broccoli
- Website: eon.co.uk

Danjaq, LLC (formerly Danjaq S.A. and Danjaq, Inc.) is a holding company formerly responsible for the copyright and trademarks to the characters, elements, and other material related to James Bond on screen before its acquisition by Amazon MGM Studios. It is currently owned and managed by the family of Albert R. Broccoli, the co-initiator of the film franchise.

== History ==
=== Founding ===
Danjaq S.A. was founded by Albert R. Broccoli and Harry Saltzman after the release of the first James Bond film Dr. No, in 1962, to ensure control of all future films in the series. The new company was named Danjaq from combining the names of Broccoli and Saltzman's respective wives (Dana Broccoli and Jacqueline Saltzman). The company was originally domiciled in the Canton of Vaud in Switzerland, hence the appearance of "S.A." letters in the first legal name of the company. In 1962, Danjaq began its association with United Artists.

=== Ownership ===
Due to a series of failed business interests, Harry Saltzman's personal financial difficulties forced him to sell his 50% share of Danjaq to United Artists in 1975.

In 1986, Albert and Dana Broccoli acquired United Artists' 50% stake in the company and so assumed complete control of Danjaq. John Cork claims that in exchange for the sale, MGM/UA received an exclusive distribution deal with Danjaq that is far more lucrative than when the shares were originally owned by Broccoli and Saltzman.

Danjaq's legal domicile was changed from Switzerland to Delaware in October 1992. The Delaware company's legal name was Danjaq, Inc. The company was converted to a limited liability company in January 1997. In 1999, as part of a settlement of a lawsuit between MGM and Sony, Sony acquired MGM's interest in the Spider-Man film rights, while Danjaq bought out the rights to the novel Casino Royale.

Following the death of Albert Broccoli in 1996 and Dana Broccoli in 2004, control of Danjaq was passed to Dana's son (and Albert's step-son), Michael G. Wilson.

=== Copyright status ===
Although the trademarks for material related to the Bond films are held by Danjaq, the copyrights to the first twenty film properties and No Time to Die are co-owned by Danjaq, LLC and Metro-Goldwyn-Mayer Studios Inc. (the technical successor to subsidiary United Artists). The copyrights to Casino Royale, Quantum of Solace, Skyfall and Spectre, are shared between Danjaq, LLC, Metro-Goldwyn-Mayer Studios Inc., and Columbia Pictures. Danjaq, LLC also credited as one of its present copyright owners of the 1967 film Casino Royale, the other being original production unit Famous Artists Productions.

=== Films made outside the control of Danjaq ===
Two Bond films have been made outside the control of Danjaq: The first was the 1967 film Casino Royale, with David Niven as Bond, and the second was the 1983 film Never Say Never Again, a remake of Thunderball. Never Say Never Again was the result of a legal dispute involving Kevin McClory, one of the credited co-writers of the story used for the novel Thunderball, who was awarded the film rights to the novel in a 1963 settlement with Ian Fleming.

=== Sale of James Bond Intellectual Property to Amazon MGM Studios ===
On February 20, 2025, Amazon MGM Studios announced that they closed a $20 million deal with the Broccoli family to form a joint venture to house the copyright and trademarks to the characters, elements, and other material related to James Bond in film. As a part of this deal, the Broccoli family ceded creative control of the film series to Amazon MGM Studios, but will will continue to financially benefit from future productions. By September of 2025, the name of the new joint venture London Operations, LLC had replaced Danjaq in copyright notices for merchandise related to James Bond film series.

== Litigation ==
=== Danjaq LLC v. James Bond Ltd ===
On 13 July 2009, Danjaq applied under s.69(1)(b) of the Companies Act 2006 for a change of name of James Bond Ltd, which had been registered since 12 June 2009. James Bond Ltd was ordered by the adjudicator at the Company Names Tribunal to change its name and to not register another company with an offending name. The respondent was also ordered to contribute toward Danjaq's costs.
