= Jack Whittingham =

British playwright and screenwriter (1910–1972)

- Born: 2 August 1910; Heaton, West Riding of Yorkshire, England
- Died: 3 July 1972 (aged 61); Valletta, Malta
- Occupations: Playwright, screenwriter
- Years active: 1939–1970
- Spouse: Margot Isobel Gough (m. 1942)

Jack Whittingham (2 August 1910 – 3 July 1972) was a British playwright and screenwriter.

== Early life ==
Whittingham was born in Heaton, West Riding of Yorkshire, England, and educated at Charterhouse between 1924 and 1929. He then went up Lincoln College, Oxford to read law. During the early 1930s he was briefly engaged to the Wrigley heiress, Ada Elizabeth Offield. Between 1932 and 1937, Whittingham worked for a number of newspapers and in 1937 joined Alexander Korda as a contract screenwriter. During the Second World War, he was based on Iceland with an artillery regiment.

== Film career ==
Beginning with the film Q Planes in 1938, Whittingham was a prolific screenwriter. Between 1937 and 1948, he wrote 14 screenplays for companies including RKO, Associated British Picture Corporation, British National and Ealing Studios.

=== Ealing Studios ===
In 1948 he was a contracted screenwriter for Ealing Studios. He wrote the original story and screenplay for Cage of Gold (1950), Pool of London (1951), Hunted (1952), The Divided Heart (1954) and the screenplay for I Believe in You (1954), Mandy (1952) and West of Zanzibar (1954).

=== British Lion ===
In 1956 he joined British Lion Films where he wrote The Birthday Present (1957).

=== Thunderball ===
Whittingham collaborated with Ian Fleming and producer Kevin McClory on a screenplay for a James Bond film. However, when Fleming developed cold feet about McClory as producer of this first James Bond screenplay, he novelised the work into his ninth official novel, Thunderball; however, the novel only credited Fleming.

McClory and Whittingham then sued Fleming, which led to a settlement in 1963 that gave McClory the film rights to the novel. During the lawsuit, Whittingham stepped down as 'co-plaintiff' and stood by McClory as 'principal witness', having previously signed away all his rights "of whatsoever nature" entirely when the screenplay was presumed finished. As a result of the settlement, future versions of the novel were forced to credit, based on the screen treatment by Kevin McClory, Jack Whittingham, and Ian Fleming (in that order). Two adaptations of Thunderball were subsequently made, the first being Thunderball in 1965 as part of the series of films from Eon Productions. The second adaptation was the film Never Say Never Again in 1983. Further adaptations had been planned at one point or another by McClory, but were scrapped due to lawsuits from MGM and United Artists.

In the film Thunderball, credits are somewhat complex. Like a good number of James Bond films, it was promoted as being "Ian Fleming's". The screenplay was credited to Richard Maibaum and John Hopkins. However, it was also credited as having been "based on an original screenplay by Jack Whittingham," which also was credited as being "based on the original story by Kevin McClory, Jack Whittingham, and Ian Fleming". Whittingham's sole original screenplay credit has been omitted from posters and other promotional materials.

=== Post-Thunderball ===
In his late fifties, Whittigham decided to take up sailing. He went to the Boat Show at Olympia and bought a boat; six books on how to sail, and spent a couple of weekends on his old friend Tom Farmiloe's boat before setting off for France.

In July 1965, his daughter, Sylvan, launched his new boat, "Domani", a 38-foot Atlantic Ketch, and, later that year Whittingham and his wife, Margo, his son Jonathan and one other crew member Christopher Smith. left the UK and set sail for Malta where they had built a villa overlooking the harbour at Marsaxlokk. During the six week voyage, they endured mechanical problems and a hurricane-force storm during the crossing of the Bay of Biscay. The ship's company were forced to heave to under bare poles for three days which fortunately pushed the vessel North East back out into the Atlantic rather than towards the coastline.

They put into Gibraltar for repairs where Christopher left the boat to return to England. Maltese authorities were concerned when the arrival of the boat was overdue and search parties made attempts to locate them. He finally limped into Valletta harbour, and, whilst retired and living in Malta, worked on screenplays about the lives of Ian Fleming (The Life of Ian Fleming) and Oleg Penkovsky.

== Personal life ==
In 1942 he married Margot Isobel Gough and they had a daughter, Suilven (Sylvan) born 2 December 1943, and boy, Jonathan, born 5 June 1946. Sylvan became a singer and photographer. References

== Death ==
Whittingham died of a heart attack in Valletta, Malta, on 3 July 1972.

== Selected filmography ==
- Q Planes (1939)
- Escape to Danger (1943)
- Welcome, Mr. Washington (1944)
- Twilight Hour (1945)
- Waltz Time (1945)
- Kiss the Bride Goodbye (1945)
- The Laughing Lady (1946)
- The Lisbon Story (1946)
- Green Fingers (1947)
- Counterblast (1948)
- The Dancing Years (1950)
- Cage of Gold (1950)
- Pool of London (1951)
- Mandy (1952)
- Hunted (1952)
- West of Zanzibar (1954)
- The Divided Heart (1954)
- I Believe in You (1954)
- The Birthday Present (1957)
- Thunderball (1965)
- Never Say Never Again (1983) - used Whittingham's original treatment

== Television scripts ==
- Danger Man (1964)
