= Cage of Gold =

1950 British film by Basil Dearden

- Original British quad format poster
- Directed by: Basil Dearden
- Screenplay by: Jack Whittingham
- Story by: Paul L. Stein; Jack Whittingham
- Produced by: Michael Balcon
- Starring: Jean Simmons; David Farrar; James Donald; Herbert Lom
- Cinematography: Douglas Slocombe
- Edited by: Peter Tanner
- Music by: Georges Auric
- Production company: Ealing Studios
- Distributed by: GFD (UK)
- Release date: 21 September 1950 (UK)
- Running time: 84 minutes
- Country: United Kingdom
- Language: English
- Box office: £192,000

Cage of Gold is a 1950 British drama film directed by Basil Dearden, and starring Jean Simmons, David Farrar, and James Donald. It was written by Paul L. Stein and Jack Whittingham.

== Plot ==
A young woman, Judith Moray, deserts her prospective fiancé, the nice doctor Alan Kearn, for an old flame the dashing, but roguish, former wing commander Bill Glennan. Glennan gets her pregnant and marries her, but leaves her on the morning after the wedding when he learns that her father cannot offer him financial support. Two years later, she having been told that Glennan is dead – has married Kearn, and they keep Glennan's son. But then, Glennan suddenly reappears and begins to blackmail her.

== Cast ==
- Jean Simmons as Judith Moray
- David Farrar as Bill Glennan
- James Donald as Dr Alan Kearn
- Herbert Lom as Rahman
- Madeleine Lebeau as Marie Jouvet
- Maria Mauban as Antoinette Duport
- Bernard Lee as Inspector Grey
- Grégoire Aslan as Duport
- Gladys Henson as Waddy
- Harcourt Williams as Dr Kearn senior
- Léo Ferré as Victor
- George Benson as Assistant Registrar
- Martin Boddey as Police Sergeant Adams
- Arthur Hambling as Jenkins
- Campbell Singer as Constable
- Sam Kydd as waiter
- Arthur Howard as Registry Office Bridegroom

== Production ==
Michael Relph was forced to do the movie at short notice at the request of Ealing.

== Release ==
Cage of Gold premiered on 21 September 1950 at Odeon Marble Arch in London, replacing the Burt Lancaster comedy Mister 880.

== Reception ==
The Monthly Film Bulletin wrote: "Cage of Gold is an unpretentious film, content to rely on its qualities as an absorbing story. That these are insufficient is the reason for its failure. It is indeed difficult to imagine just where the script writer imagined the chief interest of his narrative to lie; it is in no sense a study of character; the story develops extremely conventionally until the quite ingeniously staged murder; and the final mystery is no sooner propounded than it is (none too satisfactorily) cleared away. Basil Dearden has realised this abortive subject with his usual adroitmess, creating at moments at least the illusion of tension; too often, though, he carries his partiality for the shock cut, the vivid effect, into the region of self-caricature."

The reviewer for The Times wrote: "Ealing Studios normally know what they are about, and, in an admirably objective programme note, they frankly admit that Cage of Gold breaks completely away from what they call their 'semi-documentary' style, and is 'emotional melodrama'. The description can be accepted. ... It all runs efficiently to its rules and timetable, and, oddly enough, Miss Simmons acts better here than in So Long at the Fair."

Picture Show wrote that the film is "lavishly staged and efficiently directed, but the characters are somewhat stereotyped".

After the US première on 18 January 1952, The New York Times reviewer Howard Thompson wrote: "Cage of Gold ... is a polished, often suspenseful British version of the familiar old Enoch Arden yarn. The fact that it doesn't come off on the whole is not only disappointing, but downright annoying. For even with some serious shortcomings, here is a quality product, as might be expected from Michael Balcon, who has produced more than his share of top-notch imports. This one has, at least, all the top-notch trimmings. The photography is excellent, Basil Dearden's direction is slick as a whistle, and the acting of the cast, headed by Jean Simmons and David Farrar, is almost consistently good. ... Sadly, though, the picture as a whole is a letdown".

Variety wrote: "Affer a succession: of sophisticated hits, it is too bad to find Ealing Studios wasting their talents and a big cast on this obvious story. ... Technical qualities of the production are up to the high Ealing standard, but the story is an unsatisfactory vehicle. Nevertheless, Jean Simmons gives a moving study as the girl who was carried away by a man whom she had loved from her-youth. It is a tender performance. David Farrar takes the part of the no-good husband in his stride but it does not show him up to best advantage. James Donald does a good enough job as husband No. 2. Herbert. Tom, one of Britain's best character actors, is wasted in a minor role as the head man-of a:smuggling ring, Madeleine Lebeau is a disappointment as the French nightclub songstress." Basil Dearden's direction suffers from the limitations imposed by Jack Whittingham's script. Jim Morahan's London Parisian settings are very good and Douglas Slocombe's lensing is efficient."
