= Robert Sellers =

English author (born 1965)

- Born: 3 February 1965 (age 61); Leeds, UK
- Occupations: Writer; author

Robert Sellers (born 3 February 1965) is an English writer and author, primarily known for work on his show-business biographies and popular culture. He has written several books, including Cult TV, which covers the history of ITC, Lew Grade's television company, and The Battle for Bond, an analysis of the legal case regarding plagiarism in relation to Ian Fleming's James Bond character.

Sellers originally studied drama and pursued a career in stand-up comedy before transitioning to film journalism. Over the years, he has written for various publications, such as the Daily Mail, Empire, Total Film, The Independent, SFX and Cinema Retro. Sellers has conducted interviews with prominent figures in the entertainment industry, including Roger Moore, Christopher Lee, and Richard Dreyfuss.

Sellers has also authored books on the entertainment industry, notably Very Naughty Boys: The Amazing True Story of HandMade Films, which details the history of the British film company HandMade Films. His work has been featured in several television documentaries, including The 100 Best Family Films on Channel 4.

== Published works ==
- Sting: A Biography (1989)
- The Films of Sean Connery (1990)
- Sigourney Weaver: A Biography (1992)
- Harrison Ford: A Biography (1993)
- Tom Cruise: A Biography (1997)
- Sean Connery: A Celebration (1999)
- The Radio Times Guide To Film (contributor) (2000)
- The Radio Times Guide To Science Fiction (contributor) (2002)
- Very Naughty Boys: The Amazing True Story of HandMade Films (2003)
- Cult TV: The Golden Age of ITC (2006)
- The Battle for Bond (2006)
- Hellraisers: The Life and Inebriated Times of Burton, Harris, O'Toole and Reed (2008)
- James Robertson Justice – What's the Bleeding Time? (co-author) (2008)
- Hollywood Hellraisers: The Wild Life And Fast Times of Marlon Brando, Dennis Hopper, Warren Beatty and Jack Nicholson (2009)
- Little Ern: The Authorised Biography of Ernie Wise (co-author) (2011)
- The True Adventures of the World's Greatest Stuntman: My Life as Indiana Jones, James Bond, Superman and Other Movie Heroes (co-author) (2011)
- Hello, Darlings!: The Authorized Biography of Kenny Everett (co-author) (2013)
- Don't Let the Bastards Grind You Down: How One Generation of British Actors Changed the World (2011)
- What Fresh Lunacy Is This? – The Authorised Biography of Oliver Reed (2013)
- Peter O'Toole: The Definitive Biography (2015)
- Red Glory: Manchester United and Me (co-author) (2017)
- When Harry Met Cubby: The Story of the James Bond Producers (2019)
- The Remarkable Tale of Radio 1: The History of the Nation's Favourite Station, 1967–1982 (2021)
- Raising Laughter: How the Sitcom Kept Britain Smiling in the 70s (2021)
- Marquee: The Story of the World's Greatest Music Venue co-author (2022)
- The Secret Life of Ealing Studios: Britain's Favourite Film Studio (2022)
- When the British Musical Ruled the World (2023)
- 1971: 100 Films from Cinema's Greatest Year (2023)
- The Search for Bond: How the 007 Role Was Won and Lost (2024)
- The Real Pink Panther: Stories Behind the Classic Films (2025)
- The Royal Film Performance: A Celebration (2025)
- The Cambridge Footlights: A Very British Institution (2026)
- Still Laughing: How the Sitcom Kept Britain Smilling in the '80s (2026)
