= Never Say Never Again =

1983 James Bond film directed by Irvin Kershner

- British cinema poster by Renato Casaro
- Directed by: Irvin Kershner
- Screenplay by: Lorenzo Semple Jr.; Dick Clement (uncredited); Ian La Frenais (uncredited)
- Story by: Kevin McClory; Jack Whittingham; Ian Fleming
- Based on: Thunderball by Ian Fleming
- Produced by: Jack Schwartzman
- Starring: Sean Connery; Klaus Maria Brandauer; Max von Sydow; Barbara Carrera; Kim Basinger; Bernie Casey; Alec McCowen; Edward Fox
- Cinematography: Douglas Slocombe
- Edited by: Ian Crafford
- Music by: Michel Legrand
- Production company: Taliafilm
- Distributed by: Warner Bros. (North America); Columbia-EMI-Warner Distributors (United Kingdom); Producers Sales Organization (International)
- Release dates: 7 October 1983 (U.S.); 15 December 1983 (London)
- Running time: 134 minutes
- Countries: United States; United Kingdom; West Germany
- Language: English
- Budget: $36 million
- Box office: $160 million

Never Say Never Again is a 1983 spy film directed by Irvin Kershner. The film is based on the 1961 James Bond novel Thunderball by Ian Fleming, which in turn was based on an original story by Kevin McClory, Jack Whittingham, and Fleming. The novel had been previously adapted as the 1965 film Thunderball. Never Say Never Again is the second and most recent James Bond film not to be produced by Eon Productions (the usual producer of the Bond series) but instead by Jack Schwartzman's Taliafilm. The film was executive produced by Kevin McClory, one of the original writers of the Thunderball storyline. McClory had retained the filming rights of the novel following a long legal battle dating from the 1960s.

Sean Connery played the role of Bond for the seventh and final time, making his return to the character twelve years after Diamonds Are Forever (1971). The film's title is a reference to Connery's reported declaration in 1971 that he would "never again" play that role. As Connery was 52 at the time of filming, the script makes frequent reference to Bond as aging and past his prime – although Connery was three years younger than his Eon Productions replacement, Roger Moore. The storyline features Bond being reluctantly brought back into action to investigate the theft of two nuclear weapons by SPECTRE. Filming locations included France, Spain, the Bahamas, and Elstree Studios in England.

Never Say Never Again was released by Warner Bros. on 7 October 1983, and opened to positive reviews, with critics praising the cast's performances and Connery's return to the role. The film grossed $160 million at the box office, making it a commercial success, although it earned less overall than the Eon-produced Octopussy, released earlier the same year. Retrospective reception to Never Say Never Again has been mixed, and it is considered by several critics to be one of the weaker Bond films.

== Plot ==
After the MI6 agent James Bond fails a routine training exercise, his superior M sends him to a health clinic outside London to get back into shape. While there, Bond witnesses a nurse beating a male patient with a bandaged face. While the patient's eye is being scanned with a machine, she spots Bond and sends an assassin after him, whom he kills in a lengthy fight. An angry M is forced to pay for the damage the fight causes to the clinic, and he consequently suspends Bond from active duty.

The nurse is Fatima Blush, an agent of the criminal organisation SPECTRE, which is run by Ernst Stavro Blofeld. The man she was beating is Jack Petachi, a United States Air Force pilot who has undergone an operation on his eye to make it match the retinal pattern of the US President. He uses his altered retina to authorize the replacement of dummy warheads with live nuclear warheads in two cruise missiles. SPECTRE then steals the warheads, intending to extort billions of dollars from NATO. Blush covers up the crime by murdering Petachi.

M is ordered to reactivate the double-0 section, and Bond is tasked with tracking down the missing weapons. He follows a lead to the Bahamas and finds Domino Petachi, Jack's sister, and her wealthy lover Maximillian Largo, who is SPECTRE's top agent. Bond has sex with Blush aboard her boat, after which she tries to kill him. He then follows Largo's yacht to France, where he joins forces with his CIA ally Felix Leiter and his French contact Nicole. Posing as a masseur, Bond gives a massage to Domino, who reveals that Largo is hosting a charity event that evening. At the event, Bond beats Largo at a video game and wins money from him, but says he will accept a dance with Domino instead of a check. While dancing, Bond informs Domino that her brother was killed on Largo's orders.

Returning to his villa, Bond finds Nicole killed by Blush. He pursues her, but she captures him. She then demands that he declare in writing that she was his best sexual partner. Bond pulls out a pen to write, then shoots Blush with an explosive dart from the pen.

Bond boards Largo's yacht in search of the missing warheads. He finds Domino, and attempts to make Largo jealous by kissing her. Enraged, Largo traps Bond and takes him and Domino to Palmyra, his base of operations in North Africa. Largo punishes Domino for her betrayal by offering her to a group of men, but Bond escapes from captivity and rescues her.

Bond and Domino reunite with Leiter on a US Navy submarine. After the first warhead is found and defused in Washington, D.C., they track Largo to the Tears of Allah, a location on the coast. Bond and Leiter infiltrate the underground facility and a gun battle ensues between Leiter's team and Largo's men. Amidst the chaos, Largo flees with the second warhead. Bond catches and fights him underwater. As Largo is about to shoot Bond with a spear gun, Domino arrives and kills him. Bond defuses the warhead, then returns to the Bahamas with Domino. He vows he will never return to MI6, but she is skeptical.

== Cast ==
- Sean Connery as James Bond, MI6 agent 007.
- Klaus Maria Brandauer as Maximillian Largo, a billionaire businessman and SPECTRE Number 1, SPECTRE's senior-most agent. He is based on the character Emilio Largo in Thunderball
- Max von Sydow as Ernst Stavro Blofeld, the head of SPECTRE.
- Barbara Carrera as Fatima Blush; SPECTRE Number 12, assigned to hunt down and kill Bond. She is based on Fiona Volpe in Thunderball.
- Kim Basinger as Domino Petachi, sister of Jack Petachi and girlfriend/mistress of Maximillian Largo. The surname was changed to Petrescu for the Italian release of the film.
- Bernie Casey as Felix Leiter, Bond's CIA contact and friend.
- Alec McCowen as "Q" (aka Algy or Algernon), Double-0 section Quartermaster who issues specialised equipment to Bond.
- Edward Fox as "M", Bond's superior at MI6.
- Pamela Salem as Miss Moneypenny, M's secretary.
- Rowan Atkinson as Nigel Small-Fawcett, Foreign Office representative in the Bahamas.
- Saskia Cohen-Tanugi as Nicole, Bond's French contact
- Valerie Leon as Lady in Bahamas, whom Bond successfully seduces.
- Milow Kirek as Dr. Kovacs, a nuclear physicist working for SPECTRE.
- Pat Roach as Lippe, a SPECTRE assassin who tries to kill Bond at the clinic.
- Anthony Sharp as Lord Ambrose, Foreign Secretary who orders M to reactivate the Double-0 section.
- Prunella Gee as Nurse Patricia Fearing, a physiotherapist at the clinic.
- Gavan O'Herlihy as Captain Jack Petachi, a USAF pilot used by SPECTRE to steal the nuclear missiles, and Domino Petachi's brother.

== Production ==
Never Say Never Again had its origins in the early 1960s, following the controversy over the 1961 Thunderball novel. Fleming had worked with independent producer Kevin McClory and scriptwriter Jack Whittingham on a script for a potential Bond film, to be called Longitude 78 West, which was subsequently abandoned because of the costs involved. Fleming, "always reluctant to let a good idea lie idle", turned this into the novel Thunderball, for which he did not credit either McClory or Whittingham; McClory then took Fleming to the High Court in London for breach of copyright, and the matter was settled in 1963. After Eon Productions started producing the Bond films, it subsequently made a deal with McClory, who would produce Thunderball, and then not make any further version of the novel for a period of ten years, following the release of the Eon-produced version in 1965.

In the mid-1970s, McClory again started working on a second adaptation of Thunderball and, with the working title Warhead, he brought writer Len Deighton together with Sean Connery to work on a script. A lawsuit with Eon Productions ended in a ruling that McClory owned the sole rights to SPECTRE and Blofeld, forcing Eon to remove them from The Spy Who Loved Me (1977). The script initially focused on SPECTRE shooting down aircraft over the Bermuda Triangle, before taking over Liberty Island and Ellis Island as staging areas for an invasion of New York City through the sewers under Wall Street. The script was purchased by Paramount Pictures in 1978. The script ran into difficulties, after accusations from Danjaq and United Artists that the project had gone beyond copyright restrictions, which confined McClory to a film based only on the novel Thunderball; once again, the project was delayed.

Towards the end of the 1970s, developments were reported on the project under the name James Bond of the Secret Service, but when producer Jack Schwartzman became involved in 1980, and cleared a number of the legal issues that still surrounded the project, he decided against using Deighton's script. The project returned to the original nuclear terrorism plot of the original Thunderball, in order to avoid another lawsuit from Danjaq, and after McClory saw Jimmy Carter mention the issue in a 1980 presidential debate with Ronald Reagan. Schwartzman brought on board scriptwriter Lorenzo Semple, Jr. to work on the screenplay. Schwartzman wanted him to make the screenplay "somewhere in the middle" between his campier projects such as Batman, and his more serious projects such as Three Days of the Condor. Connery was unhappy with some aspects of the script, and asked Tom Mankiewicz, who had rewritten Diamonds Are Forever, to work on it; however, Mankiewicz declined, as he felt he was under a moral obligation to Albert R. Broccoli. Semple Jr. ultimately left the project, after Irvin Kershner was hired as director, and Schwartzman began cutting out the "big numbers" from his script to save on the budget. Connery then hired British television writers Dick Clement and Ian La Frenais to undertake re-writes, although they went uncredited for their efforts, despite much of the final shooting script being theirs. This was because of a restriction by the Writers Guild of America. Clement and La Frenais continued rewriting during the production, often altering it from day to day.

The film underwent one final change in title: after Connery had finished filming Diamonds Are Forever, he had pledged that he would "never again" play Bond. Connery's wife, Micheline, suggested the title Never Say Never Again, referring to her husband's vow, and the producers acknowledged her contribution by listing on the end credits "Title Never Say Never Again by Micheline Connery". A final attempt by Fleming's trustees to block the film was made in the High Court in London in the spring of 1983, but this was thrown out by the court and Never Say Never Again was permitted to proceed.

=== Cast and crew ===
When producer Kevin McClory had first planned the film in 1964, he held initial talks with Richard Burton for the part of Bond, although the project came to nothing because of the legal issues involved. When the Warhead project was launched in the late 1970s, a number of actors were mentioned in the trade press, including Orson Welles for the part of Blofeld, Trevor Howard to play M and Richard Attenborough as director.

In 1978, the working title James Bond of the Secret Service was being used and Connery was in the frame once again, potentially going head-to-head with the next Eon Bond film, Moonraker. By 1980, with legal issues again causing the project to founder, Connery thought himself unlikely to play the role, as he stated in an interview in the Sunday Express: "When I first worked on the script with Len I had no thought of actually being in the film." When producer Jack Schwartzman became involved, he asked Connery to play Bond; Connery agreed, negotiating a fee of $3 million ($10 million in 2025 dollars), casting and script approval, and a percentage of the profits. Subsequent to Connery reprising the role, Semple altered the script to include several references to Bond's advancing years – playing on Connery being 52 at the time of filming – and academic Jeremy Black has pointed out that there are other aspects of age and disillusionment in the film, such as the Shrubland's porter referring to Bond's car ("They don't make them like that anymore"), the new M having no use for the 00 section and Q with his reduced budgets. Originally, Semple wanted to emphasize Bond's age even further, writing the script to include him in semi-retirement working aboard a Scottish fishing trawler hunting Soviet Navy submarines in the North Sea. Connery's casting was formally announced in March 1982. He trained with Steven Seagal to help get in shape for the production.

For the main villain in the film, Maximillian Largo, Connery suggested Klaus Maria Brandauer, the lead of the 1981 Academy Award-winning Hungarian film Mephisto. Through the same route came Max von Sydow as Ernst Stavro Blofeld, although he still retained his Eon-originated white cat in the film. For the femme fatale, director Irvin Kershner selected former model and Playboy cover girl Barbara Carrera to play Fatima Blush – the name coming from one of the early scripts of Thunderball. Carrera said she modeled her performance on the Hindu goddess Kali, and to "mix that in with a little bit of black widow and a little bit of praying mantis." Carrera's performance as Fatima Blush earned her a Golden Globe Award nomination for Best Supporting Actress, which she lost to Cher for her role in Silkwood. Micheline Connery, Sean's wife, had met up-and-coming actress Kim Basinger at the Grosvenor House Hotel in London and suggested her to Connery; he agreed after Dalila Di Lazzaro refused the Domino role. For the role of Felix Leiter, Connery spoke with Bernie Casey, saying that, as the Leiter role was never remembered by audiences, using a black Leiter might make him more memorable. Others cast included comedian Rowan Atkinson, who would later parody Bond in his role of Johnny English in 2003. Atkinson's character was added by Clement and La Frenais after the production had already started, in order to provide the film with a comic relief. Edward Fox was cast as M in order to portray the character as a young technocrat in contrast to the older portrayal by Bernard Lee, and to parody the Thatcher ministry's budget cuts to government services.

Connery wanted to persuade Richard Donner to direct the film, but after their meeting, Donner decided he disliked the script. Former Eon Productions' editor and director of On Her Majesty's Secret Service, Peter R. Hunt, was approached to direct the film, but declined due to his previous work with Eon. Irvin Kershner, who had previously worked with Connery on A Fine Madness (1966), and had achieved success in 1980 with The Empire Strikes Back, was then hired. A number of the crew from the 1981 film Raiders of the Lost Ark were also appointed, including first assistant director David Tomblin, director of photography Douglas Slocombe, second unit director Mickey Moore and production designers Philip Harrison and Stephen Grimes.

=== Filming ===
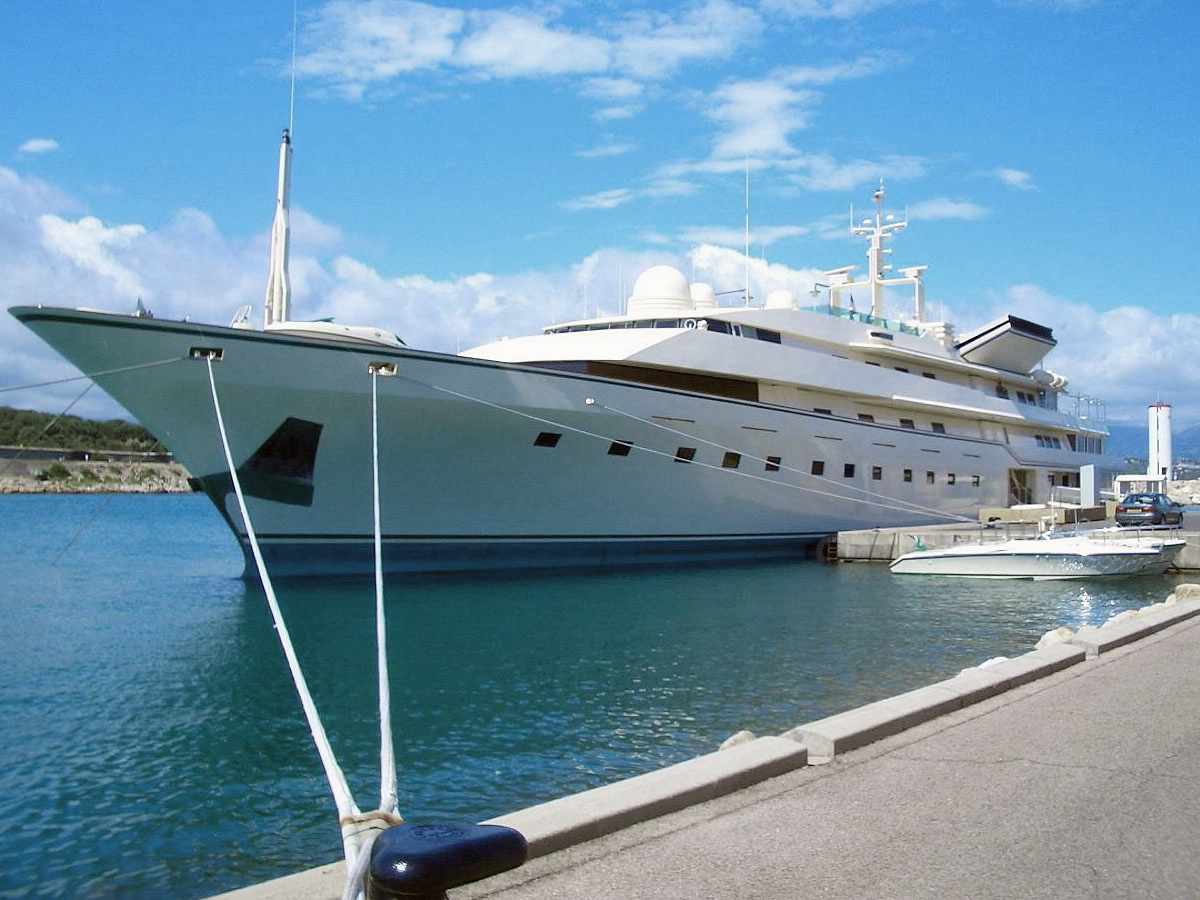
Kingdom 5KR which acted as Largo's ship, the Flying Saucer

Filming for Never Say Never Again began on 27 September 1982 on the French Riviera for two months, before moving to Nassau, the Bahamas in mid-November, where filming took place at Clifton Pier, which was also one of the locations used in Thunderball. Largo's Palmyran fortress was actually historic Fort Carré in Antibes. Largo's ship, the Flying Saucer, was portrayed by the yacht Kingdom 5KR, then owned by Saudi billionaire Adnan Khashoggi and called Nabila. The underwater scenes were filmed by Ricou Browning, who had coordinated the underwater scenes in the original Thunderball. Principal photography finished at Elstree Studios, where interior shots were filmed. Elstree also housed the Tears of Allah underwater cavern, which took three months to construct, while the Shrublands health spa was filmed at Luton Hoo. Most of the filming was completed in the spring of 1983, although there was some additional shooting during the summer of 1983.

Production on the film was troubled, with Connery taking on many of the production duties with assistant director David Tomblin. Director Irvin Kershner was critical of producer Jack Schwartzman, saying that, while he was a good businessman, "he didn't have the experience of a film producer". After the production ran out of money, Schwartzman had to fund further production out of his own pocket, and later admitted he had underestimated the amount the film would cost to make. There was tension on set between Schwartzman and Connery, who at times barely spoke to each other. Connery was unimpressed with the perceived lack of professionalism behind the scenes, and was on record as saying that the whole production was a "bloody Mickey Mouse operation!"

Steven Seagal, who was a martial arts instructor for this film, broke Connery's wrist while training. On an episode of The Tonight Show with Jay Leno, Connery revealed he did not know his wrist was broken until over a decade later.

=== Music ===
James Horner was both Kershner's and Schwartzman's first choice to compose the score, after they were impressed with his work on Star Trek II: The Wrath of Khan. Horner, who worked in London for most of the time, was unavailable, according to Kershner, though Schwartzman later claimed Sean Connery vetoed him. Frequent Bond composer John Barry was invited, but declined out of loyalty to Eon. The music for Never Say Never Again was ultimately written by Michel Legrand, who composed a score similar to his work as a jazz pianist. The score has been criticised as "anachronistic and misjudged", "bizarrely intermittent" and "the most disappointing feature of the film". Legrand also wrote the main theme "Never Say Never Again", which featured lyrics by Alan and Marilyn Bergman — who had also worked with Legrand on the Academy Award-winning song "The Windmills of Your Mind" — and was performed by Lani Hall after Bonnie Tyler, who disliked the song, had reluctantly declined.

Phyllis Hyman also recorded a potential theme song, with music written by Stephen Forsyth and lyrics by Jim Ryan, but the song — an unsolicited submission — was passed over, given Legrand's contractual obligations with the music.

=== Legal substitutions ===
This 007 motif takes the place of Eon's gun barrel sequence.

Many of the elements of the Eon-produced Bond films were not present in Never Say Never Again for legal reasons. These included the gun barrel sequence (although a similar graphic is used for the "shield" during the "video game" sequence). A screen full of 007 symbols appeared instead, and similarly there was no "James Bond Theme" to use, although no effort was made to supply another tune. A pre-credits sequence was filmed but not used; instead, the film opens with the credits running over the top of the sequence of Bond on a training mission.

== Release and reception ==
Never Say Never Again opened on 7 October 1983 in 1,550 theatres, grossing an October record $10,958,157 over the four-day Columbus Day weekend, which was reported to be "the best opening record of any James Bond film" up to that point, surpassing Octopussy's $8.9 million from June that year. The film had its UK premiere at the Warner West End cinema in London on 14 December 1983 with Prince Andrew in attendance before opening to the public in London the following day and across the UK on 16 December. It grossed $157,750 in its first 8 days in London from 8 screens in the West End, placing it at number one at the London box office. Worldwide, Never Say Never Again grossed $160 million, which was a solid return on the budget of $36 million. The film ultimately earned less than Octopussy, which grossed $187.5 million. It was the first James Bond film to be officially released in the Soviet Union, premiering in the summer of 1990 with a gala in Moscow.

Warner Bros. released Never Say Never Again on VHS and Betamax in 1984, and on laserdisc in 1995. After Metro-Goldwyn-Mayer purchased the distribution rights in 1997 (see Legacy, below), the company has released the film on both VHS and DVD in 2001, and on Blu-ray in 2009.

=== Contemporary reviews ===
Never Say Never Again was broadly welcomed and praised by the critics: Ian Christie, writing in the Daily Express, said that Never Say Never Again was "one of the better Bonds", finding the film "superbly witty and entertaining, ... the dialogue is crisp and the fight scenes imaginative". Christie also thought that "Connery has lost none of his charm and, if anything, is more appealing than ever as the stylish resolute hero". David Robinson, writing in The Times also concentrated on Connery, saying that: "Connery ... is back, looking hardly a day older or thicker, and still outclassing every other exponent of the role, in the goodnatured throwaway with which he parries all the sex and violence on the way". For Robinson, the presence of Connery and Klaus Maria Brandauer as Maximillian Largo "very nearly make it all worthwhile." The reviewer for Time Out summed up Never Say Never Again by saying: "The action's good, the photography excellent, the sets decent; but the real clincher is the fact that Bond is once more played by a man with the right stuff."

Derek Malcolm in The Guardian showed himself to be a fan of Connery's Bond, saying the film contains "the best Bond in the business", but nevertheless did not find Never Say Never Again any more enjoyable than the recently released Octopussy (starring Roger Moore), or "that either of them came very near to matching Dr. No or From Russia with Love". Malcolm's main issue with the film was that he had a "feeling that a constant struggle was going on between a desire to make a huge box-office success and the effort to make character as important as stunts". Malcolm summed up that "the mix remains obstinately the same – up to scratch but not surpassing it". Writing in The Observer, Philip French noted that "this curiously muted film ends up making no contribution of its own and inviting damaging comparisons with the original, hyper-confident Thunderball". French concluded that "like an hour-glass full of damp sand, the picture moves with increasing slowness as it approaches a confused climax in the Persian Gulf".

Writing for Newsweek, critic Jack Kroll thought the early part of the film was handled "with wit and style", although he went on to say that the director was "hamstrung by Lorenzo Semple's script". Richard Schickel, writing in Time, praised the film and its cast. He wrote that Klaus Maria Brandauer's character was "played with silky, neurotic charm", while Barbara Carrera, playing Fatima Blush, "deftly parodies all the fatal femmes who have slithered through Bond's career". Schickel's highest praise was saved for the return of Connery, observing "it is good to see Connery's grave stylishness in this role again. It makes Bond's cynicism and opportunism seem the product of genuine worldliness (and world weariness) as opposed to Roger Moore's mere twirpishness."

Janet Maslin, writing in The New York Times, was broadly praising of the film, saying she thought that Never Say Never Again "has noticeably more humor and character than the Bond films usually provide. It has a marvelous villain in Largo." Maslin also thought highly of Connery in the role, observing that "in Never Say Never Again, the formula is broadened to accommodate an older, seasoned man of much greater stature, and Mr. Connery expertly fills the bill." Writing in The Washington Post, Gary Arnold was fulsome in his praise, saying that Never Say Never Again is "one of the best James Bond adventure thrillers ever made", going on to say that "this picture is likely to remain a cherished, savory example of commercial filmmaking at its most astute and accomplished." Arnold went further, saying that "Never Say Never Again is the best acted Bond picture ever made, because it clearly surpasses any predecessors in the area of inventive and clever character delineation".

The critic for The Globe and Mail, Jay Scott, also praised the film, saying that Never Say Never Again "may be the only installment of the long-running series that has been helmed by a first-rate director." According to Scott, the director, with high-quality support cast, resulted in the "classiest of all the Bonds". Roger Ebert gave the film 3 1/2 out of four stars, and wrote that Never Say Never Again, while consisting of a basic "Bond plot", was different from other Bond films: "For one thing, there's more of a human element in the movie, and it comes from Klaus Maria Brandauer, as Largo." Ebert went on to add, "there was never a Beatles reunion ... but here, by God, is Sean Connery as Sir James Bond. Good work, 007." Gene Siskel of The Chicago Tribune also gave the film 3½ out of four stars, writing that the film was "one of the best 007 adventures ever made".

John Nubbin reviewed Never Say Never Again for Different Worlds magazine and stated that "Never Say Never Again is not great, but Connery is - and for a lot of people, including myself, that was enough. This time, anyway."

Colin Greenland reviewed Never Say Never Again for Imagine, and stated that "Never Say Never Again is a complacent male sexist fantasy, where women can be only femmes fatales or passive victims."

=== Retrospective reviews ===
Because Never Say Never Again is not an Eon-produced film, it has not been included in a number of subsequent reviews. Norman Wilner of MSN said that 1967's Casino Royale and Never Say Never Again "exist outside the 'official' continuity, [and] are excluded from this list, just as they're absent from MGM's megabox. But take my word for it; they're both pretty awful". Nevertheless, retrospective reviews of the film remain positive. Rotten Tomatoes sampled 55 critics and judged 71% of the reviews as positive, with a top critics' rating of 70%. The site's critical consensus reads: "While the rehashed story feels rather uninspired and unnecessary, the return of both Sean Connery and a more understated Bond make Never Say Never Again a watchable retread." The score is still more positive than some of the Eon films, with Rotten Tomatoes ranking Never Say Never Again 16th among all Bond films in 2008. On Metacritic, the film has a weighted average score of 68 out of 100 based on 15 critics, indicating generally favourable reviews. Empire gave the film three of a possible five stars, observing that "Connery was perhaps wise to call it quits the first time round". IGN gave Never Say Never Again a score of five out of ten, claiming that the film "is more miss than hit". The reviewer also thought that the film was "marred with too many clunky exposition scenes and not enough moments of Bond being Bond".

In 1995, Michael Sauter of Entertainment Weekly rated Never Say Never Again as the ninth best Bond film to that point, after 17 films had been released. Sauter thought the film "is successful only as a portrait of an over-the-hill superhero." He admitted that "even past his prime, Connery proves that nobody does it better". James Berardinelli, in his review of Never Say Never Again, thinks the re-writing of the Thunderball story has led to a film which has "a hokey, jokey feel, [it] is possibly the worst-written Bond script of all". Berardinelli concludes that "it's a major disappointment that, having lured back the original 007, the film makers couldn't offer him something better than this drawn-out, hackneyed story." Critic Danny Peary wrote that "it was great to see Sean Connery return as James Bond after a dozen years". He also thought the supporting cast was good, saying that Klaus Maria Brandauer's Largo was "neurotic, vulnerable ... one of the most complex of Bond's foes" and that Barbara Carrera and Kim Basinger "make lasting impressions." Peary also wrote that the "film is exotic, well acted, and stylishly directed ... It would be one of the best Bond films if the finale weren't disappointing. When will filmmakers realize that underwater fight scenes don't work because viewers usually can't tell the hero and villain apart and they know doubles are being used?"

Jim Smith and Stephen Lavington, in their 2002 retrospective Bond Films, lament: "The production chaos is visible on screen, with frequently mediocre editing, direction, stunt work and photography all emerging from the restricted budget. [...] At the time, Never Say Never Again got away with it, thanks to public and critical pleasure at seeing Connery again. Now it is dated, slow and (worst of all) looks cheap, faring badly when compared to even the poorest of the Eon films."

== Legacy ==
Originally, Never Say Never Again was intended to start a series of Bond films produced by Schwartzman and starring Connery as James Bond, with McClory announcing the next planned film, S.P.E.C.T.R.E, in a February 1984 issue of Screen International. When Connery announced that he would not reprise his role as Bond in another film produced by Schwartzman three weeks before the deadline to purchase the rights to another film for $5 million, Schwartzman said that he was unlikely to make another film without a deal from MGM/UA and Danjaq.

In the 1990s, McClory announced plans to make another adaptation of the Thunderball story starring Timothy Dalton entitled Warhead 2000 AD, but the film was eventually scrapped. In 1997, Sony Pictures acquired McClory's rights for an undisclosed amount, and subsequently announced that it intended to make a series of Bond films, as the company also held the rights to Casino Royale. This move prompted a round of litigation from MGM, which was settled out of court, forcing Sony to give up all claims on Bond (with MGM's acquisition of the rights to Casino Royale finally allowing Eon Productions to make a serious, non-satirical film adaptation of that novel in 2006, with Daniel Craig as James Bond); McClory still claimed he would proceed with another Bond film, and continued his case against MGM and Danjaq; on 27 August 2001, the court rejected McClory's suit. McClory died in 2006. In 2013, McClory's heirs sold the Thunderball rights to Eon, allowing the company to reintroduce Blofeld to the Eon series in the film Spectre.

On 4 December 1997, MGM announced that the company had purchased the rights to Never Say Never Again from the estate of Schwartzman's company Taliafilm. The company has since handled the release of both the DVD and Blu-ray editions of the film.

== See also ==
- Outline of James Bond

== Bibliography ==
- Barnes, Alan; Hearn, Marcus (2001). Kiss Kiss Bang! Bang!: the Unofficial James Bond Film Companion. Batsford Books. ISBN 978-0-7134-8182-2.
- Benson, Raymond (1988). The James Bond Bedside Companion. London: Boxtree Ltd. ISBN 1-85283-234-7.
- Black, Jeremy (2004). Britain Since the Seventies: Politics and Society in the Consumer Age. Guilford: Biddles Ltd. ISBN 978-1-86189-201-0.
- Black, Jeremy (2005). The Politics of James Bond: from Fleming's Novel to the Big Screen. University of Nebraska Press. ISBN 978-0-8032-6240-9.
- Burlingame, Jon (2012). The Music of James Bond. Oxford: Oxford University Press. ISBN 978-0-19-986330-3.
- Chancellor, Henry (2005). James Bond: The Man and His World. London: John Murray. ISBN 978-0-7195-6815-2.
- Chapman, James (2009). Licence to Thrill: A Cultural History of the James Bond Films. New York: I.B. Tauris. ISBN 978-1-84511-515-9.
- Lindner, Christoph (2003). The James Bond Phenomenon: a Critical Reader. Manchester University Press. ISBN 978-0-7190-6541-5. Archived from the original on 10 April 2023.
- Macintyre, Ben (2008). For Yours Eyes Only. London: Bloomsbury Publishing. ISBN 978-0-7475-9527-4.
- Mankiewicz, Tom; Crane, Robert (2012). My Life as a Mankiewicz. Lexington, KY: University Press of Kentucky. ISBN 978-0-8131-3605-9.
- Peary, Danny (1986). Guide for the Film Fanatic. Simon & Schuster. ISBN 978-0-671-61081-4.
- Pfeiffer, Lee; Worrall, Dave (1998). The Essential Bond. London: Boxtree Ltd. ISBN 978-0-7522-2477-0.
- Pratt, Douglas (2005). Doug Pratt's DVD: Movies, Television, Music, Art, Adult, and More!. London: UNET 2 Corporation. ISBN 978-1-932916-01-0.
- Reeves, Tony (2001). The Worldwide Guide to Movie Locations. Chicago: A Cappella. ISBN 978-1-55652-432-5.
- Smith, Jim (2002). Bond Films. London: Virgin Books. ISBN 978-0-7535-0709-4.
