= Eon Productions =

British film production company

Eon Productions Limited
- Type: Private (limited with share capital)
- Industry: Entertainment; Film
- Founded: 6 July 1961; 65 years ago
- Founders: Albert R. Broccoli; Harry Saltzman
- Headquarters: London, United Kingdom
- Area served: Worldwide
- Key people: Michael G. Wilson; Barbara Broccoli
- Products: James Bond film series
- Website: eon.co.uk

Eon Productions Limited is a British film production company that primarily and formerly produced the James Bond film series. The company is based in London's Piccadilly and also operates from Pinewood Studios in the UK.

== James Bond films ==
Eon was started by film producers Albert R. "Cubby" Broccoli and Harry Saltzman in July 1961, at the same time they became partners and sought financing for Dr. No. The year before they formed Danjaq, which for legal reasons became Eon's holding company, from which it licenses the rights to produce the Bond films.

Broccoli had been interested in the Bond novel rights for several years but was dissuaded from pursuing the project by his former partner. When they dissolved their relationship he was free to pursue the property, for which Saltzman, a novice to film production, had taken a gamble to acquire. The two were introduced by a New York writer who was acquainted with both, and formed a partnership within a week of meeting. The enterprise was and is still a family business, including both wives of the principal partners, as well as several of their progeny, the latter group now carrying on their parents' work. Albert almost immediately included Dana Broccoli's college-aged son Michael G. Wilson in the early films, doing various production jobs.

In 1975, after nine films, Harry Saltzman sold his shares of Danjaq to United Artists (UA). Although Albert R. Broccoli died in 1996, Eon Productions is still owned by the Broccoli family, specifically Albert R. Broccoli's daughter, Barbara Broccoli, and his stepson and her half-brother by actress Dana Wilson Broccoli, Michael G. Wilson, who are the current producers of the films.

In February 2025, Amazon MGM Studios and Michael G. Wilson and Barbara Broccoli announced the formation of a joint venture that would manage the franchise rights to James Bond, giving Amazon MGM full creative control from the Broccoli family.

Albert R. Broccoli's name has appeared in the opening "presents" credit of every Eon-produced James Bond film, and as the first name in the credits from The Spy Who Loved Me onwards. From Dr. No through The Man with the Golden Gun, the credit was "Harry Saltzman and Albert R. Broccoli present"; for some films Broccoli came first. After Saltzman left, the opening credit was "Albert R. Broccoli presents" through to GoldenEye, which was the last film produced before Broccoli's death, even after Barbara Broccoli and Michael G. Wilson replaced him as producers. On all films since Broccoli's death, the opening credit is "Albert R. Broccoli's Eon Productions presents", with "Ltd." usually added after "Productions" in the film proper.

The 1965 film Thunderball differs from the others in how it credits Saltzman and Broccoli; due to a legal agreement with Kevin McClory related to the rights to Ian Fleming's original novel, McClory received producer credit on the film, with Saltzman and Broccoli credited as executive producers. This agreement also gave McClory the rights to remake Thunderball in the future, resulting in the 1983 non-Eon production, Never Say Never Again. McClory would attempt to remake the story a second time in the 1990s, but was prevented from doing so. In 1999, Eon picked up the rights to the Casino Royale novel after a lawsuit between Metro-Goldwyn-Mayer (MGM) and Sony Pictures ended as part of a trade deal that saw Sony acquiring MGM's interest in the Spider-Man film rights.

The copyrights and trademarks for the film properties which began with Dr. No, are held by Danjaq and United Artists Corporation; United Artists was bought by MGM in 1981, but as an MGM subsidiary its name still appears in Bond copyright and trademark disclaimers. Casino Royale (2006), Quantum of Solace (2008), Skyfall (2012) and Spectre (2015) were co-distributed with Sony Pictures Releasing through its Columbia Pictures label. With the revival of United Artists – formed as a joint venture between MGM and Annapurna Pictures under the label United Artists Releasing – as well as the expiration of Columbia Pictures' deal with the Bond franchise, the distribution of No Time to Die (2021) is shared between United Artists Releasing (domestically) and Universal Pictures (internationally), while Danjaq retains the essential rights to the film.

The distribution rights for all of Eon's films are owned by MGM Home Entertainment, and were controlled by MGM's distributor Warner Bros. Home Entertainment (previously 20th Century Fox Home Entertainment). Sony Pictures Home Entertainment initially assumed the home video rights to Casino Royale, but the 2012 home video editions of this film were issued by MGM and 20th Century Fox. Since 2020, WBHE took over the home entertainment distribution rights to the Bond films after MGM ended their home media agreement with Fox in June 2020, excluding the home media release of No Time to Die (which was released in 2021 and was handled by Universal Pictures Home Entertainment, although both companies own a joint venture called Studio Distribution Services).

== List of Bond films ==
The Bond films produced by Eon Productions are:

1. Dr. No (1962)
2. From Russia with Love (1963)
3. Goldfinger (1964)
4. Thunderball (1965)
5. You Only Live Twice (1967)
6. On Her Majesty's Secret Service (1969)
7. Diamonds Are Forever (1971)
8. Live and Let Die (1973)
9. The Man with the Golden Gun (1974)
10. The Spy Who Loved Me (1977)
11. Moonraker (1979)
12. For Your Eyes Only (1981)
13. Octopussy (1983)
14. A View to a Kill (1985)
15. The Living Daylights (1987)
16. Licence to Kill (1989)
17. GoldenEye (1995)
18. Tomorrow Never Dies (1997)
19. The World Is Not Enough (1999)
20. Die Another Day (2002)
21. Casino Royale (2006)
22. Quantum of Solace (2008)
23. Skyfall (2012)
24. Spectre (2015)
25. No Time to Die (2021)

Other production companies were responsible for the Bond productions Casino Royale (1967) and Never Say Never Again (1983). Never Say Never Again is a remake of Thunderball.

== Other film productions ==
Since its first film, Dr. No in 1962, Eon has made eight non-Bond films. Saltzman and Broccoli produced other films separately: Broccoli produced the film Chitty Chitty Bang Bang, based on a book by Ian Fleming; Saltzman produced several non-Bond films during this time including The Ipcress File and Battle of Britain.

Other non-Bond projects from either 1963 or 1964 – The Marriage Game written by Terry Southern and to have been directed by Peter Yates and The Pass Beyond Kashmir based on the novel by Berkely Mather – did not go into production.

In 2008, Eon signed a deal with Columbia Pictures to develop fifteen thrillers and family films outside the Bond franchise, with budgets of up to $80 million (£40 million). The company hopes the move will allow more British writers to establish themselves in the United States.

Eon Productions produced the adaptation of Mark Burnell's first book in the Stephanie Patrick series, titled The Rhythm Section. Starring Blake Lively and directed by Reed Morano, and distributed by Paramount Pictures. The film was released on 31 January 2020.

The non-Bond films produced by Eon Productions are:

1. Call Me Bwana (1963)
2. The Silent Storm (2014)
3. Radiator (2014)
4. Film Stars Don't Die in Liverpool (2017)
5. Nancy (2018)
6. The Rhythm Section (2020)
7. Ear for Eye (2021)
8. Till (2022)
9. Chitty Chitty Bang Bang (TBA, in development)
10. The Fighter (TBA, in development)

== Theatre ==
Eon has made several theatre productions, including Chitty Chitty Bang Bang, based on a book by Ian Fleming, and Othello, starring Daniel Craig.

1. Chitty Chitty Bang Bang (2002)
2. Chariots of Fire (2012–2013)
3. Once (2012–2016)
4. Othello (2016–2017)
5. The Band's Visit (2017)
6. The Country Girls (2017)
7. Love Letters (2017)
8. The Kid Stays in the Picture (2017)
9. Strangers on a Train (2018)
10. Macbeth (2022)

== See also ==
- James Bond in video games – list of games authorised by Eon Productions and MGM Interactive
- Ian Fleming Publications – administers all of Ian Fleming's literary oeuvre as well as continuation novels by other authors
- Outline of James Bond
