= James Chapman (media historian) =

British professor and historian (born 1968)

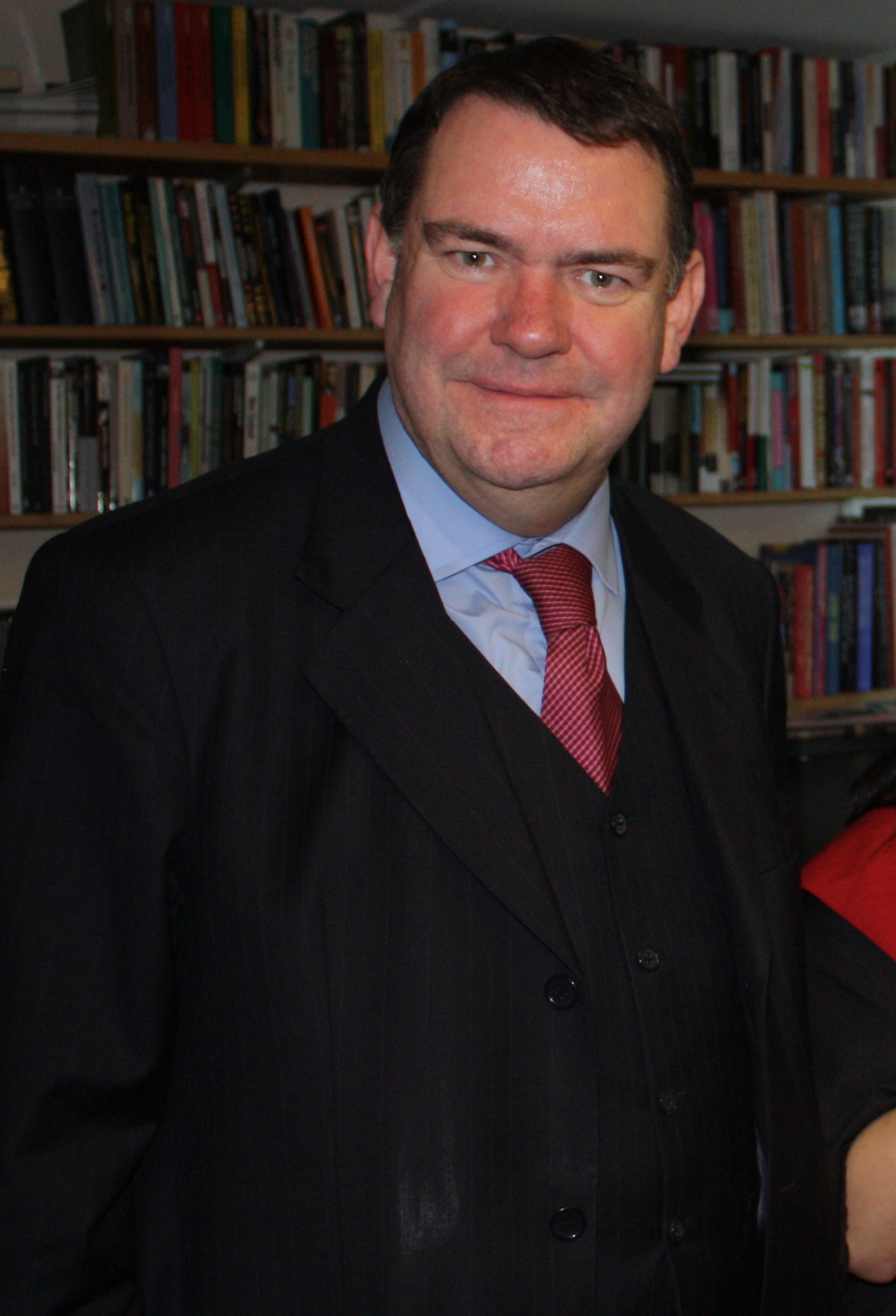
- Chapman in 2014
- Born: 1968 (age 57–58)
- Citizenship: British
- Spouse: Married
- Scientific career
- Fields: Media historian
- Institutions: University of Leicester
- Doctoral advisor: Jeffrey Richards

James Chapman (born 1968) is Professor of Film Studies at the University of Leicester. He has written several books on the history of British popular culture, including work on cinema, television and comics.

== Biography ==
James Chapman was born in Sheffield, South Yorkshire, and attended Wales High School during the 1980s. He took his BA (History) and MA (Film Studies) at the University of East Anglia and then undertook his doctoral research at Lancaster University, completing his thesis on the role of official film propaganda in Britain during the Second World War.

In 1996 he joined The Open University, where he taught a broad range of undergraduate and postgraduate courses and was principal contributing author to the university's first dedicated course on Film and Television History. He joined the University of Leicester as its founding Professor of Film Studies in 2005.

Chapman's research focuses on British popular culture, especially cinema and television in their historical contexts. He has written or edited ten books, including two which he has co-authored with Professor Nicholas J. Cull. His books include studies of the science fiction television series Doctor Who and the James Bond films. SFX magazine described his book Licence To Thrill as "thoughtful, intelligent, ludicrous and a bit snobby – bit like Bond really".

He is a Council member of the International Association for Media and History (IAMHIST) and is editor of the Historical Journal of Film, Radio and Television.

Chapman has also published articles in the following journals: Screen, Historical Journal of Film, Radio and Television, Journal of Popular British Cinema, Visual Culture in Britain, Journal of Contemporary History, Contemporary British History, Media History and European Journal of Cultural Studies.

== Bibliography ==
- The British at War: Cinema, State and Propaganda, 1939–1945, London: I.B. Tauris, 1998. ISBN 1-86064-158-X
- Licence To Thrill: A Cultural History of the James Bond Films, London: I.B. Tauris, 1999. ISBN 1-86064-387-6. 2nd edn 2007. ISBN 978-1-84511-515-9
- Windows on the Sixties: Exploring Key Texts of Media and Culture, co-edited with Anthony Aldgate and Arthur Marwick, London: I.B. Tauris, 2000.
- Saints and Avengers: British Adventure Series of the 1960s, London: I.B. Tauris, 2002. ISBN 1-86064-754-5
- Cinemas of the World: Film and Society from 1895 to the Present, London: Reaktion Books, 2003. ISBN 1-86189-162-8
- Past and Present: National Identity and the British Historical Film, London: I.B. Tauris, 2005. ISBN 1-85043-808-0
- Chapman, James (2006). Inside the Tardis : the worlds of Doctor Who : a cultural history. London: I.B. Tauris. ISBN 978-1-84511-163-2.
- Chapman, James; Glancy, Mark; Harper, Sue (2007). The New Film History: Sources, Methods, Approaches. London: Palgrave. ISBN 978-0-230-59448-7.
- Chapman, James (2008). War and Film. London: Reaktion. ISBN 978-1-86189-347-5.
- Chapman, James; Cull, Nicholas John (2009). Projecting Empire: Imperialism and Popular Cinema. London: I.B. Tauris. ISBN 9781441638472.
- Chapman, James (2011). British Comics: A Cultural History. London: Reaktion. p. 320. ISBN 978-1-86189-855-5.
- Chapman, James; Cull, Nicholas John (2013). Projecting Tomorrow: Science Fiction and Popular Cinema. London: I.B. Tauris. ISBN 978-1-78076-410-8.
