= Tiffany Case =

Character in James Bond novel and film Diamonds Are Forever

- James Bond character
- First appearance: Diamonds Are Forever (1957 novel)
- Last appearance: Diamonds Are Forever (1971 film)
- Created by: Ian Fleming
- Portrayed by: Jill St. John

In-universe information
- Gender: Female
- Affiliation: The Spangled Mob (novel); SPECTRE (unknowing) (film)
- Classification: Bond girl / Henchwoman

Tiffany Case is a fictional character in the 1956 James Bond novel Diamonds Are Forever and its 1971 film adaptation. A "Bond girl", she was portrayed by Jill St. John in the film. In the novel, the story of her name is that when she was born, her father Case was so embittered she was not a boy that he gave her mother a thousand dollars and a powder case from Tiffany's and walked out. In the film it is stated that she was named after her accidental preterm birthplace, Tiffany & Co., where her parents were going through a choice of wedding bands, to which James Bond (Sean Connery) dryly jokes that she was lucky that it had not happened at Van Cleef & Arpels.

== The novel ==
In Ian Fleming's novel Diamonds Are Forever, Tiffany Case is an American diamond smuggler working for The Spangled Mob, a ruthless American gang that is smuggling diamonds from Africa through an international pipeline. She receives orders from a telephone voice known to her only as "A B C" (actually Jack Spang, one of the mob's co-founders and the manager of its European operations), and keeps watch on couriers as they transport the diamonds from Europe to the United States. She also works as a blackjack dealer at the Tiara, a Las Vegas hotel and casino owned by Jack's brother Seraffimo that serves as the mob's American headquarters.

James Bond poses as a petty crook to make contact with Tiffany in London, using her professionally as a gateway into the pipeline even as he develops a personal interest in her. Felix Leiter, familiar with Tiffany's background, acquaints Bond with the fact that she was gang-raped as a teenager and, as a result, has developed a hatred of men. She is nevertheless attracted to Bond, and the two ultimately become lovers.

Tiffany turns against her former partners the Spangs and helps Bond escape from their clutches. In the novel, she is later kidnapped by Wint & Kidd on the Queen Elizabeth, but she is in turn rescued by Bond.

After this adventure, the two briefly live together, but, like many of Bond's women, she is out of his life by the next novel, From Russia, with Love. In this novel, Fleming writes that Tiffany found Bond too difficult to live with and returned to the United States with an American military officer, apparently intending to marry him.

== The film ==
The 1971 film adaptation of Diamonds are Forever substantially revised the plot and, with it, Tiffany (Jill St. John)'s character. In the film, she is a small-time smuggler unwittingly working for Bond (Sean Connery)'s nemesis Ernst Stavro Blofeld (Charles Gray) and his terrorist organisation, SPECTRE. Posing as gangster Peter Franks (Joe Robinson), Bond arranges a partnership with her, but this time it is to investigate her role in Blofeld's latest criminal scheme. She initially believes that she and "Franks" are going to make millions, but gets caught up in much more than she bargained for as Blofeld's henchmen, Mr. Wint (Bruce Glover) and Mr. Kidd (Putter Smith), begin eliminating all the links in the smuggling chain. When they accidentally kill Bond's casino conquest Plenty O'Toole (Lana Wood) after mistaking her for Tiffany, she helps Bond follow the path of the smuggled diamonds to Blofeld.

By the end of the film, Tiffany has helped Bond defeat Blofeld, and the two depart America on a romantic cruise together. On the first evening, they are interrupted by an assassination attempt by Wint and Kidd, but Bond foils it, and the two continue their cruise, conscious that Blofeld's diamond-encrusted satellite, now non-functional, is above them in space. Tiffany wonders aloud how they might get the diamonds back to earth again.

In an attempt to leave Las Vegas with the diamonds, Tiffany hires a red Ford Mustang Mach 1, which is later driven by Bond.

== Analysis ==
Boel Ulfsdotter argues that "Fleming's characterization of Case was found wanting when transposed from novel to screen": whereas she is portrayed as a "hardworking, independent, and single woman" in the novel, her character is watered down in the film. Ulfsdotter suggests that this is caused by the addition of Plenty O'Toole's character:

Mankiewicz introduced a second female character into the narrative despite Case's visual excess, pronounced female agenda through costuming, and self-reliant performativity, which all clearly indicate that she could have played O'Toole's part as well.
