= Mr. Wint and Mr. Kidd =

Fictional characters in the James Bond novel and film Diamonds Are Forever

- James Bond character
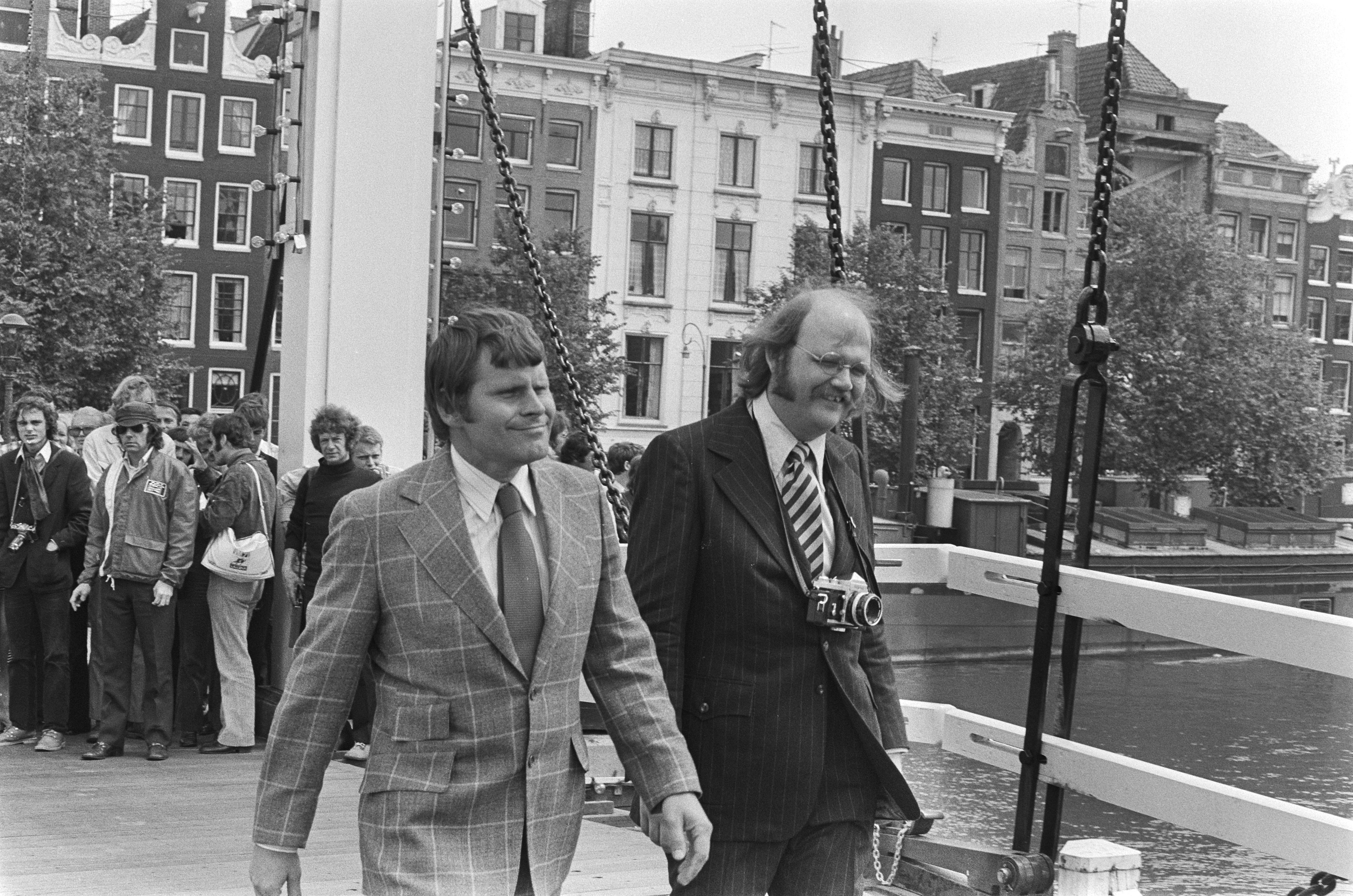
- Bruce Glover as Mr. Wint (left) and Putter Smith as Mr. Kidd (right) during filming of Diamonds Are Forever.
- First appearance: Diamonds Are Forever (1956 novel)
- Last appearance: Diamonds Are Forever (1971 film)
- Created by: Ian Fleming
- Portrayed by: Bruce Glover (Mr. Wint); Putter Smith (Mr. Kidd)

In-universe information
- Gender: Male (both)
- Affiliation: The Spangled Mob (novel); SPECTRE (film)
- Classification: Henchmen

Mr. Wint and Mr. Kidd are fictional characters in the James Bond novel and film Diamonds Are Forever. In the novel, Wint and Kidd are members of The Spangled Mob. In the film, it is assumed that they are main villain Ernst Stavro Blofeld (Charles Gray)'s henchmen, though the characters share no scenes with and are not seen taking instructions from Blofeld. One of their trademarks is trading quips after killing their targets; they also do so after a failed attempt to kill James Bond (Sean Connery). In the film, Wint is played by Bruce Glover and Kidd by jazz musician Putter Smith in a rare acting role.

== In novel ==
As killers and enforcers to the Spangled Mob, Wint and Kidd are tasked, among other things, to make sure the smuggling of the diamonds and everything connected to it go off without a hitch. They are not referred to as “Mr.” in the novel. If some error is made, Wint and Kidd are sent to "persuade" the perpetrators never to make a mistake again. They take sadistic pleasure in killing; this is particularly evident in a scene in which they pour boiling mud over the face of a jockey who they believe has prevented a Mob-owned horse from winning a race.

From London to New York City it is their job to tail whoever is smuggling the diamonds internationally to ensure that the smuggler does not get any ideas about going into business for himself. For this, the duo pose as American businessmen who call themselves "W. Winter" and "B. Kitteridge". Although they are both hardened assassins, Wint is pathologically afraid of traveling. When he must do so, he wears an identifying name tag and a sticker that says "My blood group is F." He also has to be paid a special bonus by his employers. Because of his phobia, Wint picked up the nickname "Windy", although no one would dare call him that to his face. Kidd is nicknamed "Boofy" due to his "pretty-boy" appearance. Felix Leiter suspects that they are both homosexual, a point emphasized in the film. Wint has a large red wart on one thumb, a detail that allows Leiter to confirm his involvement when Bond mentions it.

In a ghost town outside Las Vegas, the leading gangster, Seraffimo Spang, penetrates James Bond's cover and orders Wint and Kidd to torture Bond to learn his true identity. Wint and Kidd then perform a "Brooklyn stomping," kicking Bond into unconsciousness while wearing football cleats, after which smuggler Tiffany Case helps him escape. After they kidnap Tiffany on the Queen Elizabeth, Bond comes to her rescue by climbing down the side of the ship and diving into her cabin via the porthole. They have a fight, and Bond shoots and kills them both. To avoid trouble, he then fakes evidence in the cabin to make it look like a murder-suicide. After the killings, Bond considers his relationship with Tiffany and wonders if it will last forever. But he notices the dead eyes of the assassins staring at him. Bond imagines they say "nothing lasts forever, except what you did to me!" — a reference to the book's title.

== In film ==
In the 1971 film Diamonds Are Forever, Mr. Wint (Bruce Glover) and his partner Mr. Kidd (Putter Smith) are American assassins working for Ernst Stavro Blofeld (Charles Gray), although are never seen interacting with him. Their assignment is to dismantle Blofeld's diamond smuggling pipeline which, for almost two years, has been diverting diamonds to Blofeld, who is using them to construct a powerful laser satellite. With the satellite almost completed and both CIA and MI6 investigations showing too much interest in Blofeld's activities, the smuggling pipeline must be eliminated to cover Blofeld's trail. Wint and Kidd are sent to kill off anyone who comes into contact with the diamonds after they have done their part in the diamond smuggling operation. They follow the final shipment of diamonds through the pipeline running from South Africa to the United States via the Netherlands. As Mr. Wint says, "Curious how everyone who touches those diamonds seems to die."

The pair takes a sadistic pleasure in their work — for example, to Mr. Wint's amusement when Mr. Kidd photographs the body of Mrs. Whistler (Margaret Lacey), the old woman they have drowned in the canals of Amsterdam, joking about sending the pictures to the primary-age children to whom she was a school teacher. This is typical of an overtly morbid sense of humour they share, completing each other's sentences as a game and delighting in competing over laboured, blackly humorous puns. Thus an attempt to incinerate James Bond (Sean Connery), whom they thought was Peter Franks (Joe Robinson), alive in a crematorium is "a glowing tribute" and "heart-warming." They also amuse themselves with the twisted application of proverbs — for example, after blowing up a helicopter in flight Mr. Kidd begins the old quote, "If God had wanted man to fly ..." to which Mr. Wint concludes: "He would have given him wings, Mr. Kidd"; and Mr. Wint saying "If at first you don't succeed, Mr. Kidd", followed by Mr. Kidd's reply, "Try, try again, Mr. Wint."

Although working closely as partners, they never address each other by their first names, instead preferring the more courtly and conventional title of courtesy - "mister". It is strongly implied in the film that the two are lovers. They are seen holding hands in one scene; Mr. Wint also has a habit of putting on women's perfume; and at one point, Mr. Kidd remarks that Tiffany Case (Jill St. John) is attractive, "for a lady," after which Mr. Wint looks at him jealously.

The two use numerous and creative methods of killing their targets such as:

- Placing a scorpion down the shirt of Dr. Tynan (Henry Rowland), a South African dentist.
- Using a time bomb to blow up the helicopter piloted by Joe (Ray Baker) which was meant to pick up Dr. Tynan's merchandise.
- Drowning Mrs. Whistler in the Amstel River, and then joking about sending photographs of the corpse being recovered back to her schoolchildren in South Africa.
- Sealing Bond in a coffin mistaking him for Peter Franks, and sending him into a crematorium furnace. Bond escapes when his mob contacts Michael "Shady" Tree (Leonard Barr) and Morton Slumber (David Bauer) discover that the diamonds he had given them are fakes and retrieve the coffin from the furnace.
- Drowning Plenty O'Toole (Lana Wood) mistaking her for Tiffany Case, with her legs tied to a block of concrete, in a swimming pool just deep enough to cover her face, her hair seen floating at the surface is mistaken for a wig by Tiffany.
- Burying Bond alive by putting him into a length of pipeline to be buried in the desert outside Las Vegas — the second time he has been unconscious at their mercy, yet again they opt for an overly elaborate kill. Upon regaining consciousness, Bond escapes by short-circuiting a pipeline welding device, forcing some workers to inspect it.
- In a deleted scene made available on DVD releases, shooting the character Shady Tree (Leonard Barr) with a joke prop gun that first produces a flag with "BANG!" written on it, before a real bullet.

Their final attempt to kill Bond and Case takes place on the SS Canberra cruise liner after Bond foils Blofeld's plot. They pose as stewards in the couple's suite, serving them a romantic dinner which they claim is courtesy of Willard Whyte; the meal consists of Oysters Andaluz, shashlik, tidbits, prime rib au jus and Salade Utopia. Dessert is La Bombe Surprise — in the most literal sense, since it has an actual bomb hidden inside it. However, when Mr. Wint opens the wine bottle and gives Bond the cork to smell, Bond catches the scent of Mr. Wint's cologne, links it to his misadventure in the pipeline and quickly realizes that something is wrong. He comments on the cologne, describing it as "potent" and "strong enough to bury anything" (a reference to being deposited in the Las Vegas pipeline).

After tasting a glass of Mouton Rothschild '55, Bond casually remarks that he had expected a claret with such a grand dinner. When Mr. Wint replies that the ship's cellars are poorly stocked with clarets, Bond exposes the henchman's ignorance, replying that Mouton Rothschild in fact is a claret, before remarking "I've smelt that aftershave before, and both times I've smelt a rat", another reference to being abandoned in the Vegas pipeline. Realizing Bond is on to them, the pair drop the charade and attack him; Mr. Kidd ignites the shashlik skewers and moves to impale Bond with them, while Mr. Wint strangles him with the chain of his sommelier's tastevin. During the struggle, Bond first neutralizes Mr. Kidd by splashing Courvoisier on him and the flaming skewers, setting the assassin on fire. Within seconds, Mr. Kidd is engulfed in flames, and in desperation he jumps overboard into the ocean.

In an effort to help Bond, Case throws the dessert at Mr. Wint, but she misses and reveals the bomb hidden in the cake. Bond uses Wint's distraction over the bomb to shake him off, and using the villain's own coat-tails, he ties Wint's hands together. After attaching the bomb to Wint's coat, 007 vaults him overboard; the explosion kills Wint just before he hits the water. Looking on from the deck, Bond wryly comments, "Well, he certainly left with his tails between his legs."
