= Norman Burton =

American actor (1923–2003)

- Norman Burton in Wonder Woman, 1977
- Born: December 5, 1923; New York City, U.S.
- Died: November 29, 2003 (aged 79); Imperial, California, U.S.
- Occupation: Actor
- Years active: 1957–1993

Norman Burton (December 5, 1923 – November 29, 2003) was an American actor. He was occasionally credited as Normann Burton.

== Early life ==
Born in New York City, Burton was a student of the Actors Studio. After early work on stage, he broke into films with a minor role in Fright (1956).

== Career ==
His career in film and television was long and relatively successful, but he never achieved major recognition. He played the Hunt Leader, a gorilla, in the science fiction film Planet of the Apes, notable as being the first ape to be seen by both Taylor and the audience, and also appeared as a (human) army officer in the second sequel Escape from the Planet of the Apes (1971). In film, he is perhaps best known for his performance as Felix Leiter in the James Bond film Diamonds Are Forever (1971). He played Will Giddings, an ill-fated engineer, in the action film The Towering Inferno (1974), and his later films included The Gumball Rally (1976), Crimes of Passion (1984) and Deep Space (1988). He played Dennis Christopher's mean and ill-fated boss in the slasher Fade To Black (1980).

On television, he is best known for his performance as Inter-Agency Defense Command's supervisor Joe Atkinson during the second season of the DC Comics-based fantasy adventure drama series The New Adventures of Wonder Woman starring Lynda Carter. He also played Burt Dennis in the situation comedy The Ted Knight Show in the spring of 1978, and appeared as General George Marshall in the 1988 television miniseries War and Remembrance. Throughout his life, Burton was a devotee of the method school of acting, and taught method acting in Lakeside, California. He also known for playing the part of Dr. Green (Natalie’s father) in the television series The Facts of Life.

== Death ==
Burton died six days before his 80th birthday from the result of an auto accident while returning from Ajijic, Mexico near the California-Arizona state line.

== Selected filmography ==
- 1957 Fright as Reporter Thompkins
- 1960 Pretty Boy Floyd as Bill Courtney
- 1962 Hand of Death as Chief Homicide Investigator
- 1962 Womanhunt as Unknown
- 1965 Gunsmoke as Ed
- 1967 Wild Seed as Policeman
- 1967 Valley of the Dolls as Neely O'Hara's Director (uncredited)
- 1968 Planet of the Apes as Hunt Leader
- 1970 R. P. M. as Coach McCurdy
- 1971 Jud as Uncle Hornkel
- 1971 Simon, King of the Witches as Willard Rackum
- 1971 Escape from the Planet of the Apes as Army Officer
- 1971 Diamonds Are Forever as Felix Leiter
- 1972 Fuzz as Police Commissioner Nelson
- 1973 Save the Tiger as Fred Mirrell
- 1973 Hit! as Director
- 1974 The Terminal Man as Captain Anders
- 1974 The Towering Inferno as Will Giddings
- 1975 The Reincarnation of Peter Proud as Dr. Frederick Spear
- 1976 The Gumball Rally as Lieutenant Roscoe
- 1976 Scorchy as Chief Frank O'Brien
- 1977 Murder in Peyton Place as Jay Kamens
- 1980 Fade to Black as Marty Berger
- 1981 Amy as Caruthers
- 1983 Mausoleum as Dr. Simon Andrews
- 1984 Crimes of Passion as Lou Bateman
- 1985 Pray for Death as Lieutenant Anderson
- 1986 Bad Guys as Captain Watkins
- 1988 Bloodsport as CID Agent Helmer
- 1988 Deep Space General Randolph
- 1992 Live Wire as Senator Victor
- 1993 American Ninja V as U.S. Ambassador On Caracas Halden (final film role)

Preceded by Rik Van Nutter	Felix Leiter actor 1971	Succeeded by David Hedison
