= Studillac =

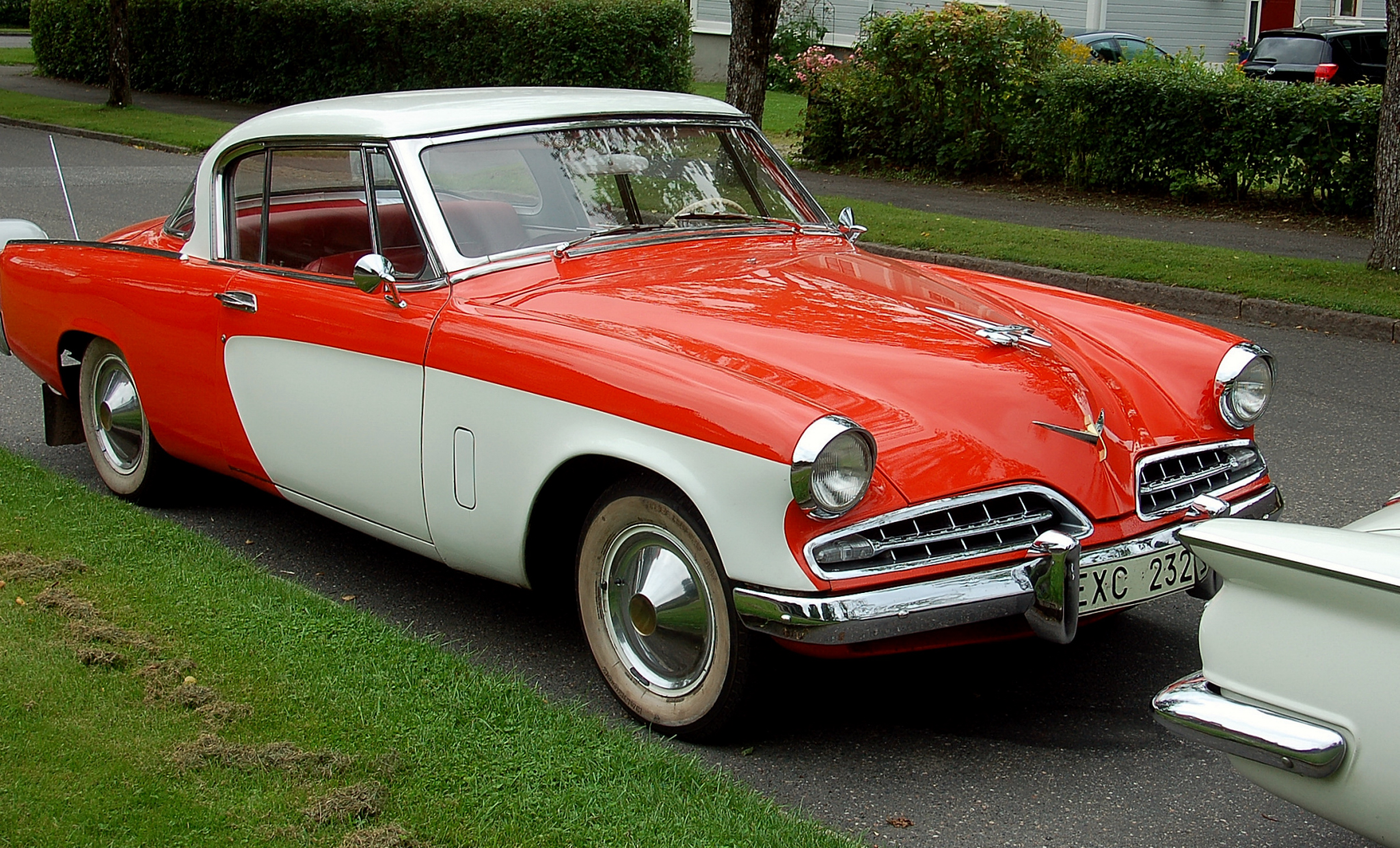
1954 Champion Starliner hard-top for five passengers

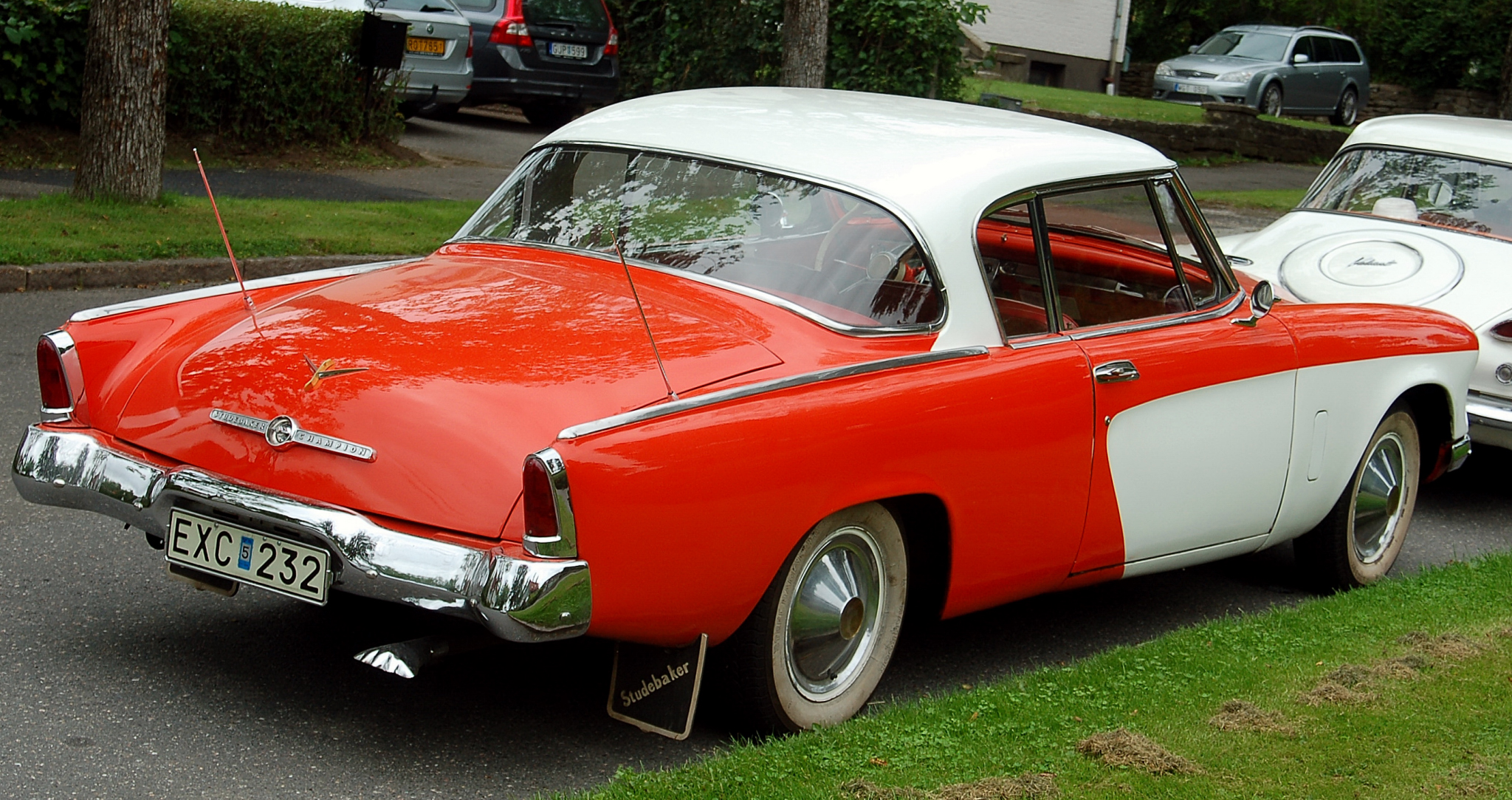

Studillac is a name given to an American customized aftermarket car assembled in Rockville Centre, New York between 1953 and 1955, comprising a hard-top Studebaker Starliner coupé fitted with an OHV 210–250 hp Cadillac V8 engine. Bill Frick Motors charged from $1500 to $1795 (manual 3-speed vs automatic) for the conversion or about $4500 to $5000 for a complete car. An option was a dual-range Hydra-Matic transmission. Other extras included leather, wire wheels (bolt-on or Borrani knock-off), electric tachometer, etc.

With top speed of 125–130 mph and 0 to 60 mph in 8.5 seconds, it was a very good value compared to the Aston Martin DB4 introduced five years later and costing £3967 including taxes ($19,835). The Aston Martin had 240 hp, a top speed of 139.3 mph and a 0 to 60 mph time of 9.3 seconds. Although the Studillac conversion included upgraded drum brakes, the DB4 had all-wheel disk brakes, and a very fine fit and finish.

Fictional CIA agent Felix Leiter, friend of James Bond, owned a black Studillac in the Ian Fleming novels Diamonds Are Forever and Goldfinger. Fleming himself had driven a Studillac when in the US.
