= Jud (film) =

1971 film by Gunther Collins

- Theatrical release poster
- Directed by: Gunther Collins
- Written by: Gunther Collins, Les Colodny
- Produced by: Edward Gruskin, Igo Kantor
- Starring: Joseph Kaufmann; Robert Deman; Claudia Jennings
- Cinematography: Isidore Mankofsky
- Edited by: James Henrickson
- Music by: Stu Phillips
- Distributed by: Maron Films
- Release date: 18 August 1971
- Running time: 80 minutes
- Country: United States
- Language: English

Jud is a 1971 American drama film directed by Gunther Collins and starring Joseph Kaufmann, Robert Deman and Claudia Jennings. The film was released on August 18, 1971 and tells the story of a Vietnam veteran adjusting back to civilian life. Joseph Kaufmann, a Green Beret who pursued an acting career after his discharge from the Marines, plays the main character.

== Cast ==
- Joseph Kaufmann as Jud
- Robert Deman as Bill
- Claudia Jennings as Sunny
- Alix Wyeth as Shirley Simon
- Norman Burton as Uncle Hornkel
- Maurice Sherbanee as Salvadore Javelli
- Vic Dunlop as Vincent Barber
- Bonnie Bittner as Kathy
- Jolivett Cato as Ben
- Paul Heslin as Dave
- Leigh Hemingway as Kitty
- Denise Lynn as Betty
- Valerie Fitzgerald as Cheryl
- John Cardos as Policeman #1
- Gene Jesso as Policeman #2
- Roger Lane as Car Lot Manager
- Janice Dryer as Mona
