= Robert Deman =

American actor

- Born: Robert Kurt Deman; November 1, 1946 (age 79); Detroit, Michigan, U.S.
- Occupation: Actor
- Years active: 1968-1982

Robert Kurt Deman (born November 1, 1946) is an American actor most famous for starring in the 1973 film Papillon as André Maturette. He also appeared in The Four Deuces (1975) starring Jack Palance and Carol Lynley, the TV movie Murder in Peyton Place (1977), and many popular television series of the 1970s, such as Cannon, starring William Conrad, The Blue Knight, starring George Kennedy and To Rome with Love, starring John Forsythe.

== Filmography ==
Year	Title	Role	Notes
1971	Jud	Bill Arness	
1973	Papillon	Andre Maturette	
1975	The Four Deuces	Blade	
