= Diamonds Are Forever (novel) =

1956 novel by Ian Fleming

- First edition cover
- Author: Ian Fleming
- Cover artist: Pat Marriott
- Series: James Bond
- Genre: Spy fiction
- Publisher: Jonathan Cape
- Publication date: 26 March 1956 (hardback)
- Publication place: United Kingdom
- Pages: 257
- Preceded by: Moonraker
- Followed by: From Russia, with Love

Diamonds Are Forever is the fourth novel by the British author Ian Fleming to feature his fictional British Secret Service agent James Bond. (Note: The novel's title is normally stylised as Diamonds are Forever.) Fleming wrote the story at his Goldeneye estate in Jamaica, inspired by a Sunday Times article on diamond smuggling. The book was first published by Jonathan Cape in the United Kingdom on 26 March 1956.

The story centres on Bond's investigation of a diamond-smuggling operation that originates in the mines of Sierra Leone and runs to Las Vegas. Along the way Bond meets and falls in love with one of the members of the smuggling gang, Tiffany Case. Much of Fleming's background research formed the basis for his non-fiction 1957 book The Diamond Smugglers. Diamonds Are Forever deals with international travel, marriage and the transitory nature of life.

As with Fleming's previous novels, Diamonds Are Forever received broadly positive reviews at the time of publication. The story was serialised in the Daily Express newspaper, first in an abridged, multi-part form and then as a comic strip. In 1971 it was adapted into the seventh Bond film in the series and was the last Eon Productions film to star Sean Connery as Bond.

== Plot ==
The British Secret Service agent James Bond is sent on an assignment by his superior, M. Acting on information received from Special Branch, M tasks Bond with infiltrating a smuggling ring transporting diamonds from mines in the Crown colony of Sierra Leone to the United States. Bond must infiltrate the smugglers' pipeline to uncover those responsible. Using the identity of "Peter Franks", a country house burglar turned diamond smuggler, he meets Tiffany Case, an attractive gang member who has developed an antipathy towards men after being gang-raped as a teenager.

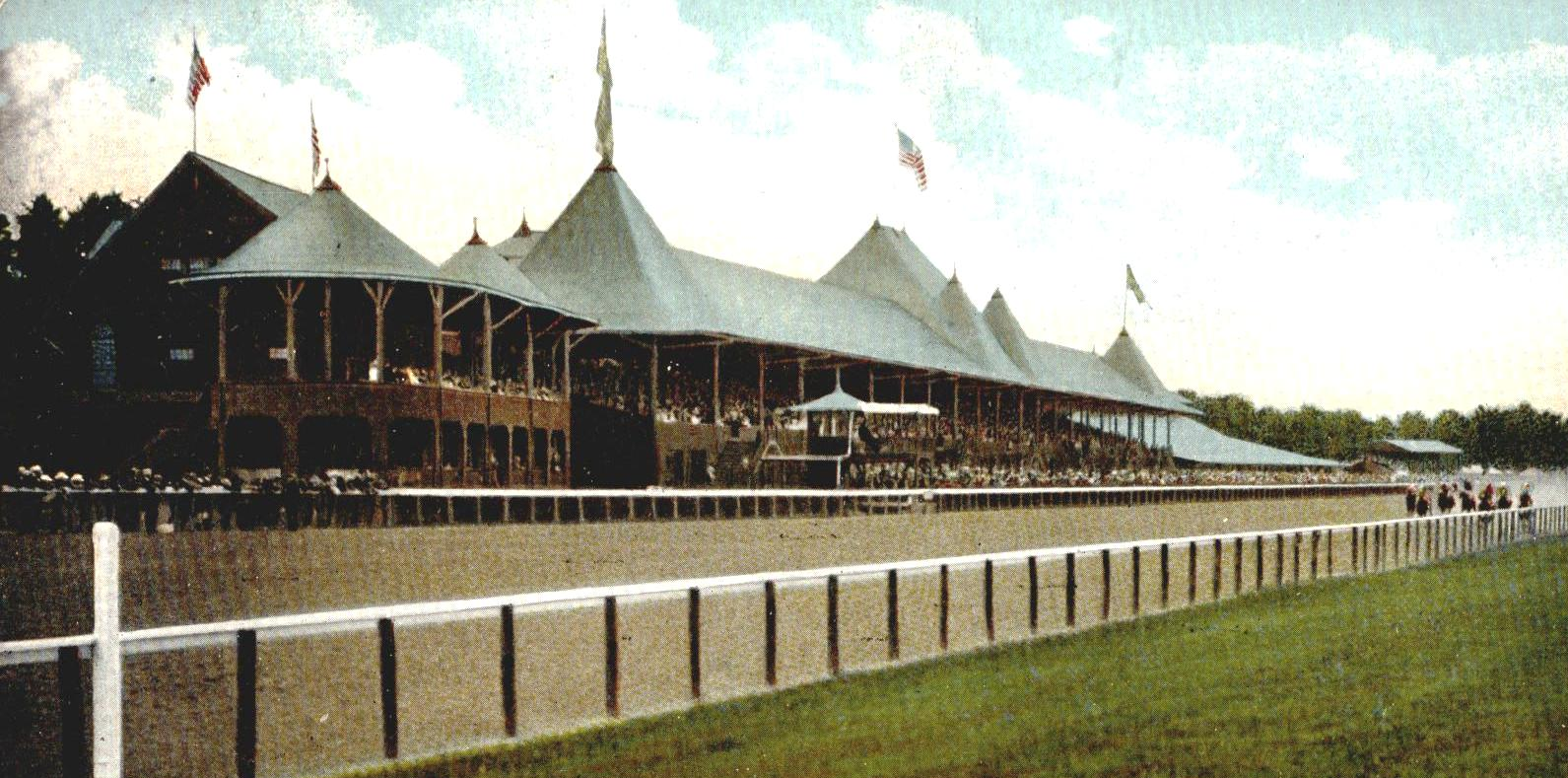
The main track of Saratoga Race Course (in 1907)

Bond discovers that the ring is operated by the Spangled Mob, a ruthless American gang run by the brothers Jack and Seraffimo Spang. He follows the trail from London to New York. To earn his fee for carrying the diamonds he is instructed by a gang member, Shady Tree, to bet on a rigged horse race in nearby Saratoga. There Bond meets his old friend Felix Leiter, a former CIA agent working at Pinkertons as a private detective investigating crooked horse racing. Leiter bribes the jockey to ensure the failure of the plot to rig the race, and asks Bond to make the pay-off. When he goes to make the payment, he witnesses two homosexual thugs, Wint and Kidd, attack the jockey.

Bond calls Tree to enquire further about the payment of his fee and is told to go to the Tiara Hotel in Las Vegas. The Tiara is owned by Seraffimo Spang and operates as the headquarters of the Spangled Mob. Spang also owns an old Western ghost town, named Spectreville, restored to be his own private holiday retreat. At the hotel Bond finally receives payment through a rigged blackjack game where the dealer is Tiffany. After winning the money he is owed he disobeys his orders from Tree by continuing to gamble in the casino and wins heavily. Spang suspects that Bond may be a 'plant' and has him captured and tortured at Spectreville. With Tiffany's help he escapes from Spectreville aboard a railway push-car with Seraffimo Spang in pursuit aboard an old Western train. Bond changes the railway points and re-routes the train onto a dead-end, and shoots Spang before the resulting crash. Assisted by Leiter, Bond and Tiffany go via California to New York, where they board the RMS Queen Elizabeth to travel to London, a relationship developing between them as they go. Wint and Kidd observe their embarkation and follow them on board. They kidnap Tiffany, planning to kill her and throw her overboard. Bond rescues her and kills both gangsters; he makes it look like a murder-suicide.

Tiffany subsequently informs Bond of the details of the pipeline. The story begins in Africa where a dentist bribes miners to smuggle diamonds in their mouths; he extracts the gems during routine appointments. From there, the dentist takes the diamonds to a rendezvous with a German helicopter pilot. Eventually the diamonds go to Paris and then on to London. There, after telephone instructions from a contact known as ABC, Tiffany meets a person who explains how the diamonds will be smuggled to New York City. After returning to London—where Tiffany moves into Bond's flat—Bond flies to Freetown in Sierra Leone, and then to the next diamond rendezvous. With the collapse of the rest of the pipeline, Jack Spang (who turns out to be ABC) shuts down his diamond-smuggling pipeline by killing its participants. Spang himself is killed when Bond shoots down his helicopter.

== Background and writing history ==
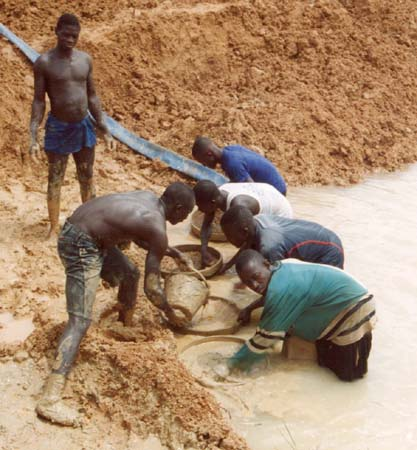
Sierra Leonean miners panning for diamonds

By mid 1954 the author Ian Fleming had published two novels—Casino Royale (1953) and Live and Let Die (1954)—and had a third, Moonraker, being edited and prepared for production. (Note: Moonraker was published in April 1955.) That year he read a story in The Sunday Times about diamond smuggling from Sierra Leone. He considered this story as the possible basis for a new novel and, through an old school friend, he engineered a meeting with Sir Percy Sillitoe, the ex-head of MI5, then working in a security capacity for the diamond-trading company De Beers. The material Fleming gathered was used in both Diamonds Are Forever and The Diamond Smugglers, a non-fiction book published in 1957. (Note: The Diamond Smugglers also contained information from Sillitoe's deputy, John Collard, whom Fleming interviewed in 1957.)

After Fleming's friend, Sir William Stephenson, sent him a magazine article about the spa town of Saratoga Springs, Fleming flew to the US in August 1954, where he met his friends Ivar Bryce and Ernest Cuneo; the three travelled to the town in New York State. There, Fleming and Cuneo visited a mud-bath: en route to an up-market establishment they took the wrong directions and ended up at a run-down outlet, which became the inspiration for the Acme Mud and Sulphur Baths scene in the book. Fleming met the rich socialite, William Woodward, Jr., who drove a Studillac—a Studebaker with a powerful Cadillac engine. According to Henry Chancellor, "the speed and comfort of it impressed Ian, and he shamelessly appropriated this car" for the book. Woodward was killed by his wife shortly afterwards—she claimed she mistook him for a prowler—and when Diamonds Are Forever was published, it was dedicated to Bryce, Cuneo and "the memory of W. W. Jr., at Saratoga, 1954 and 55".

Fleming also travelled to Los Angeles with Cuneo, visiting the Los Angeles Police Intelligence headquarters, where they met Captain James Hamilton, who provided Fleming with information on the Mafia organisation in the US. From Los Angeles Fleming travelled to Las Vegas, where he stayed at the Sands Hotel; he interviewed the hotel owner, Jack Entratter, where he learnt the background to the security systems and methods of cheating that he used in the novel.

Fleming wrote Diamonds Are Forever at his Goldeneye estate in Jamaica in January and February 1955. He followed his usual practice, which he later outlined in Books and Bookmen magazine, in which he said: "I write for about three hours in the morning ... and I do another hour's work between six and seven in the evening. I never correct anything and I never go back to see what I have written ... By following my formula, you write 2,000 words a day." On completion Fleming wrote to his friend Hilary Bray:

I baked a fresh cake in Jamaica this year which I think has finally exhausted my inventiveness as it contains every single method of escape and every variety of suspenseful action that I had omitted from my previous books—in fact everything except the kitchen sink, and if you can think up a good plot involving kitchen sinks, please send it along speedily.

He returned to London with the completed 183-page typescript in March that year; he had earlier settled on a title, which he based on an advertisement slogan "A Diamond is Forever" in the American edition of Vogue.

Although Fleming provides no dates within his novels, John Griswold and Henry Chancellor—both of whom have written books on behalf of Ian Fleming Publications—have identified different timelines based on events and situations within the novel series as a whole. Chancellor put the events of Diamonds Are Forever in 1954; Griswold is more precise, and considers the story to have taken place in July and August 1953.

== Development ==
=== Plot inspirations ===
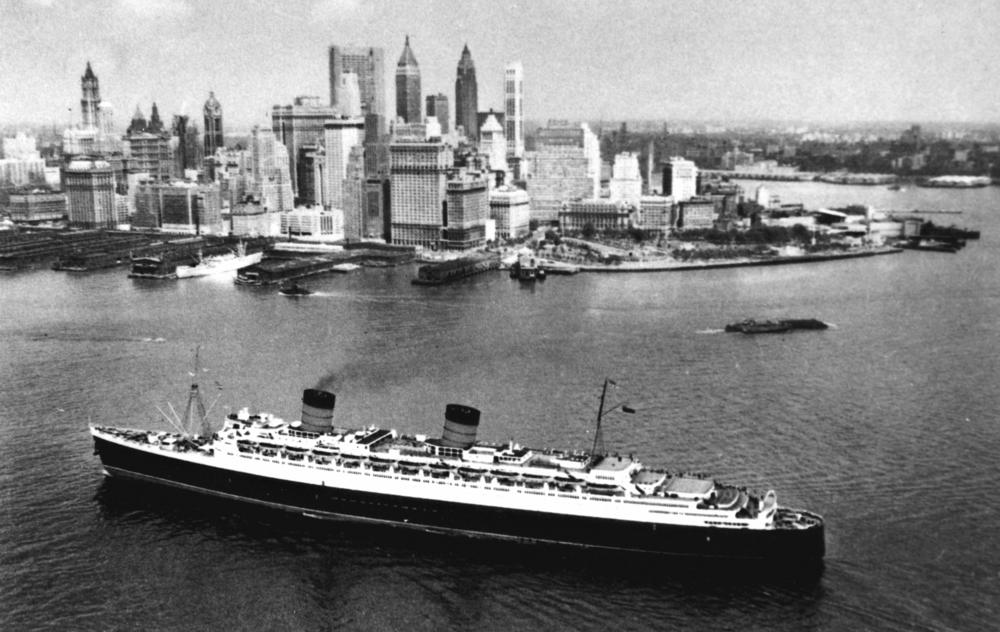
RMS Queen Elizabeth approaching New York; Fleming travelled to the US on board, Bond took the ship back to Britain.

Fleming had previously travelled to the US on the RMS Queen Elizabeth; the experience provided background information for the final four chapters of the novel. His trip had included a railway journey on the Super Chief, during which he and Cuneo had visited the cab to meet the driver and engineer, and an excursion on the 20th Century Limited, both of which gave information Fleming used for Spang's train, the Cannonball. Fleming had a long-standing interest in trains and following his involvement in a near-fatal crash associated them with danger. In addition to Diamonds Are Forever, he used them in Live and Let Die, From Russia, with Love and The Man with the Golden Gun.

As with several others of his works, Fleming appropriated the names of people he knew for the story's characters. The name of one of Fleming's two travelling companions from the US, Ernest Cuneo, was used as Ernie Cureo, Bond's taxi-driving ally in Las Vegas, (Note: The name of Fleming's other companion, Ivar Bryce, had already been used as an alias for Bond in Live and Let Die.) and one of the homosexual villains, "Boofy" Kidd, was named after one of Fleming's close friends—and a relative of his wife—Arthur Gore, 8th Earl of Arran, known to his friends as "Boofy". Arran, an advocate of the relaxation of the British laws relating to homosexuality, heard about the use of his name before publication and complained to Fleming about it, but was ignored and the name was retained for the novel. During his trip to America Fleming had come across the name Spang—old German for "maker of shoe buckles"—which he appropriated for the villainous brothers.

=== Characters ===
The writer Jonathan Kellerman's introduction to the 2006 edition of Diamonds Are Forever describes Bond as a "surprisingly ... complex" character who, in contrast with the cinematic representation, is "nothing other than human. ... Fleming's Bond makes mistakes and pays for them. He feels pain and regret." The novelist Raymond Benson—who later wrote a series of Bond novels—writes that the character develops in Diamonds Are Forever, building on Fleming's characterisation in his previous three novels. This growth arises through Bond's burgeoning relationship with the book's main female character, Tiffany Case. He falls in love; the first time he has done so since Vesper Lynd in Casino Royale. According to Benson, Tiffany is portrayed as tough, but lonely and insecure, and "is Fleming's first fully developed female character." The cultural historians Janet Woollacott and Tony Bennett write that many of the main female characters in Fleming's novels are uncommon, and Tiffany—along with Pussy Galore from Goldfinger and Honeychile Rider from Dr. No—has been "damaged ... sexually" having previously been raped. The effect of the trauma has led to Tiffany working for the villain, which allows Bond to complete his mission, and align her to a more honest lifestyle.

The literary analyst LeRoy L. Panek observes that Diamonds Are Forever along with Goldfinger and The Man with the Golden Gun have gangsters, rather than spies, as antagonists; the novel is the only one in the Bond canon without a connection to the Cold War. Panek, comparing the gangsters to Bond's normal adversaries, identifies them as "merely incompetent gunsels" when compared with the British agent, who can eliminate them with relative ease. The essayist Umberto Eco sees the Spangs as being a forerunner of the SPECTRE organisation Fleming uses in his later novels. Kingsley Amis, who later wrote a Bond novel, considered that there was "no decent villain", while Eco judges three of the villains—the two Spang brothers and Winter—as physically abnormal, as many of Bond's adversaries are. Anthony Synnott, in his examination of aesthetics in the Bond novels, also considers that the gangster Michael "Shady" Tree fits into the abnormal category, as he is a red-haired hunchback with "a pair of china eyes that were so empty and motionless that they might have been hired by a taxidermist".

== Style ==
Diamonds Are Forever opens with a passage in which a scorpion hunts and eats its prey, and is subsequently killed by one of the diamond couriers. Eco sees this "cleverly presented" beginning as similar to the opening of a film, remarking that "Fleming abounds in such passages of high technical skill". When the writer William Plomer was proof-reading the manuscript he saw literary merit, and wrote to Fleming that the passages relating to the racing stables at Saratoga were "the work of a serious writer". Kellerman considers that "Fleming's depiction of Las Vegas in the '50s is wickedly spot on and one of the finest renditions of time and place in contemporary crime fiction. The story is robust and complex."

Fleming used well-known brand names and everyday details to produce a sense of realism, which Amis called "the Fleming effect". Amis describes "the imaginative use of information, whereby the pervading fantastic nature of Bond's world ... [is] bolted down to some sort of reality, or at least counter-balanced." Benson considers that in Diamonds Are Forever the use of detail is "rich and flamboyant" which allows an "interesting and amusing" description of the US. Benson considers a weakness of the book to be a lack of structural development, although this is compensated by character development; Kellerman also believes the novel to be "rich in characterization".

Benson analyses Fleming's writing style and identifies what he describes as the "Fleming Sweep": a stylistic point that sweeps the reader from one chapter to another using 'hooks' at the end of chapters to heighten tension and pull the reader into the next: Benson feels that the sweep in Diamonds Are Forever was "at full force" in the novel, which "maintain[s] a constant level of excitement" as a result.

== Themes ==
According to Benson the main theme of Diamonds Are Forever is expressed in the title, with the permanency of the gemstones held in contrast to other aspects of the story, particularly love and life. Towards the end of the novel Fleming uses the lines "Death is forever. But so are diamonds", and Benson sees the gems as a metaphor for death and Bond as the "messenger of death".

The journalist and author Christopher Hitchens observes that "the central paradox of the classic Bond stories is that, although superficially devoted to the Anglo-American war against communism, they are full of contempt and resentment for America and Americans"; Benson sees that Diamonds Are Forever contains examples of Fleming's feelings of superiority towards American culture, including his description of the sleaziness of Las Vegas. Amis, in his exploration of Bond in The James Bond Dossier, pointed out that Leiter is

... such a nonentity as a piece of characterization ... he, the American, takes orders from Bond, the Britisher, and that Bond is constantly doing better than he, showing himself, not braver or more devoted, but smarter, wittier, tougher, more resourceful, the incarnation of little old England.

The cultural historian Jeremy Black points to the theme of international travel in Diamonds Are Forever, which was still a novelty to most people in Britain at the time. This travel between a number of a locations exacerbates one of the problems identified by Black: that there was no centre to the story. In contrast to the other novels in the Bond canon, where Casino Royale had Royale, From Russia, with Love had Istanbul and Dr. No had Jamaica, Diamonds Are Forever had multiple locations and two villains and there was "no megalomaniac fervour, no weird self-obsession, at the dark centre of the plot". (Note: Chancellor lists the locations in the book as French Guinea, London, New York, Saratoga, Las Vegas, Spectreville, Los Angeles, New York, the Atlantic and back to French Guinea.)

According to Fleming's biographer, Andrew Lycett, after the novel was completed, Fleming added four extra chapters "almost as an afterthought", detailing the events on the Queen Elizabeth. This introduced the question of marriage, and allowed Fleming to discuss matrimony through his characters, with Bond telling Case "Most marriages don't add two people together. They subtract one from the other." Lycett opines that the addition was because of the state of Fleming's own marriage which was going through a bad time.

== Publication and reception ==
=== Publication history ===
Diamonds Are Forever was published on 26 March 1956 by Jonathan Cape with a cover designed by Pat Marriott. As with the three previous Bond books, the first edition of 12,500 copies sold out quickly; the US edition was published in October 1956 by Macmillan. The novel was serialised in The Daily Express newspaper from 12 April 1956 onwards—the first of Fleming's novels he had sold to the newspaper—which led to an overall rise in the sales of the novels. From November 1956 sales of Diamonds Are Forever, and Fleming's other novels, all rose following the visit of the Prime Minister, Sir Anthony Eden, to Fleming's Goldeneye estate to recuperate following the Suez Crisis; Eden's stay was much reported in the British press. The book received boosts in sales in 1962 when Eon Productions adapted Dr. No for the cinema, and in 1971 when Diamonds Are Forever was produced for the big screen. In February 1958 Pan Books published a paperback version of the novel in the UK, which sold 68,000 copies before the end of the year. Since its initial publication the book has been issued in numerous hardback and paperback editions, translated into several languages and has never been out of print.

In 2023 Ian Fleming Publications—the company that administers all Fleming's literary works—had the Bond series edited as part of a sensitivity review to remove or reword some racial or ethnic descriptors. The rerelease of the series was for the 70th anniversary of Casino Royale, the first Bond novel.

=== Reception ===
Julian Symons, reviewing Diamonds Are Forever in The Times Literary Supplement, thought that Fleming had some enviable qualities as a writer, including "a fine eye for places ... an ability to convey his own interest in the mechanics of gambling and an air of knowledgeableness". Symons also saw defects in Fleming's style, including "his inability to write convincing dialogue". For Symons, the novel was Fleming's "weakest book, a heavily padded story about diamond smuggling", where "the exciting passages are few".

Milward Kennedy of The Manchester Guardian, thought that Fleming was "determined to be as tough as Chandler, if a little less lifelike", while Maurice Richardson, in The Observer, considered Bond "one of the most cunningly synthesised heroes in crime-fiction". Richardson wrote how "Fleming's method is worth noting, and recommending: he does not start indulging in his wilder fantasies until he has laid down a foundation of factual description." Elements of a review by Raymond Chandler for The Sunday Times were used as advertising for the novel; Chandler wrote that it was "about the nicest piece of book-making in this type of literature which I have seen for a long time ... Mr. Fleming writes a journalistic style, neat, clean, spare and never pretentious".

Writing in The New York Times, Anthony Boucher—described by Fleming's biographer John Pearson as "throughout an avid anti-Bond and an anti-Fleming man"—was mixed in his review, thinking that "Mr. Fleming's handling of America and Americans is well above the British average", although he felt that "the narrative is loose-jointed and weakly resolved", while Bond resolves his assignments "more by muscles and luck than by any sign of operative intelligence".

== Adaptations ==
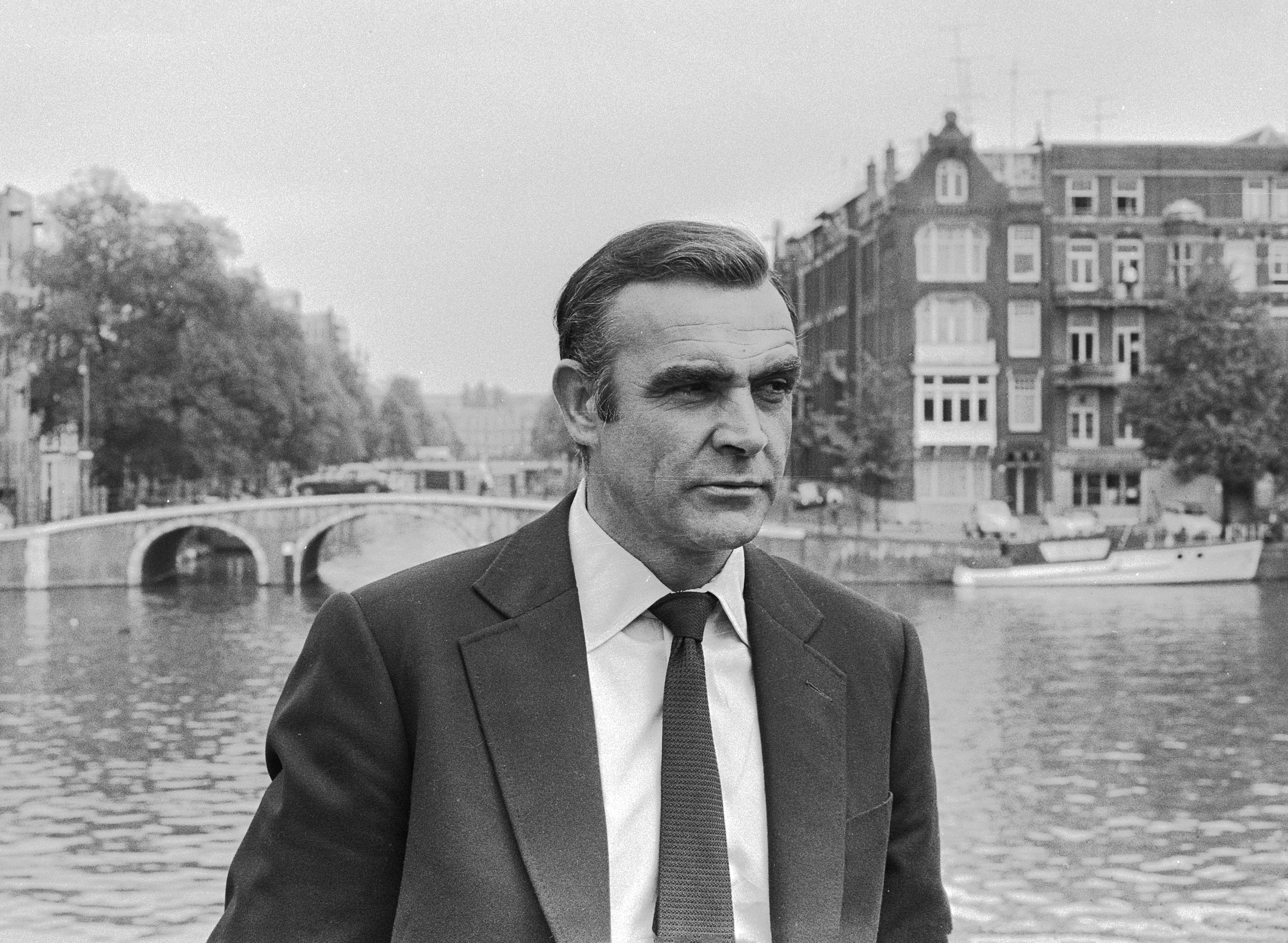
Sean Connery, in July 1971, during the filming of Diamonds Are Forever in Amsterdam

Diamonds Are Forever was adapted as a daily comic strip for the Daily Express newspaper, and syndicated around the world. The original adaptation ran from 10 August 1959 to 30 January 1960. The strip was written by Henry Gammidge and illustrated by John McLusky. (Note: Diamonds Are Forever was published again in 2005 as part of the Dr. No anthology by Titan Books.)

The novel was loosely adapted in a 1971 film starring Sean Connery and directed by Guy Hamilton. Diamonds Are Forever was the final Bond film undertaken by Sean Connery with Eon Productions, although he returned to the role of Bond twelve years later for Kevin McClory and Jack Schwartzman's Never Say Never Again.

In July 2015 Diamonds Are Forever was broadcast on BBC Radio 4, starring Toby Stephens as Bond; it was directed by Martin Jarvis.

== Notes and references ==
=== Sources ===
- Amis, Kingsley (1966). The James Bond Dossier. London: Pan Books. OCLC 154139618.
- Barnes, Alan; Hearn, Marcus (2001). Kiss Kiss Bang! Bang!: the Unofficial James Bond Film Companion. London: Batsford Books. ISBN 978-0-7134-8182-2.
- Bennett, Tony; Woollacott, Janet (2003). "The Moments of Bond". In Lindner, Christoph (ed.). The James Bond Phenomenon: a Critical Reader. Manchester: Manchester University Press. pp. 13–34. ISBN 978-0-7190-6541-5.
- Bennett, Tony; Woollacott, Janet (1987). Bond and Beyond: The Political Career of a Popular Hero. London: Routledge. ISBN 978-0-416-01361-0.
- Benson, Raymond (1988). The James Bond Bedside Companion. London: Boxtree Ltd. ISBN 978-1-85283-233-9.
- Black, Jeremy (2005). The Politics of James Bond: from Fleming's Novel to the Big Screen. Lincoln, NE: University of Nebraska Press. ISBN 978-0-8032-6240-9. Archived from the original on 23 March 2023.
- Butler, William Vivian (1973). The Durable Desperadoes. London: Macmillan. ISBN 978-0-333-14217-2.
- Chancellor, Henry (2005). James Bond: The Man and His World. London: John Murray. ISBN 978-0-7195-6815-2.
- Eco, Umberto (2009). "The Narrative Structure of Ian Fleming". In Lindner, Christoph (ed.). The James Bond Phenomenon: a Critical Reader. Manchester: Manchester University Press. pp. 34–56. ISBN 978-0-7190-6541-5.
- Faulks, Sebastian; Fleming, Ian (2009). Devil May Care. London: Penguin Books. ISBN 978-0-14-103545-1.
- Fleming, Ian; Gammidge, Henry; McLusky, John (1988). Octopussy. London: Titan Books. ISBN 978-1-85286-040-0.
- Fleming, Ian; Kellerman, Jonathan (2006). Diamonds Are Forever. London: Penguin Books. ISBN 978-0-14-102824-8.
- Griswold, John (2006). Ian Fleming's James Bond: Annotations and Chronologies for Ian Fleming's Bond Stories. Bloomington, IN: AuthorHouse. ISBN 978-1-4259-3100-1. Archived from the original on 9 July 2023.
- Lindner, Christoph (2009). The James Bond Phenomenon: a Critical Reader. Manchester: Manchester University Press. ISBN 978-0-7190-6541-5. Archived from the original on 10 April 2023.
- Lycett, Andrew (1996). Ian Fleming. London: Phoenix. ISBN 978-1-85799-783-5.
- Macintyre, Ben (2008). For Your Eyes Only. London: Bloomsbury Publishing. ISBN 978-0-7475-9527-4.
- McLusky, John; Gammidge, Henry; Hern, Anthony; Fleming, Ian (2009). The James Bond Omnibus Vol.1. London: Titan Books. ISBN 978-1-84856-364-3.
- Panek, LeRoy (1981). The Special Branch: The British Spy Novel, 1890–1980. Bowling Green, OH: Bowling Green University Popular Press. ISBN 978-0-87972-178-7.
- Parker, Matthew (2014). Goldeneye. London: Hutchinson. ISBN 978-0-09-195410-9.
- Pearson, John (1967). The Life of Ian Fleming: Creator of James Bond. London: Jonathan Cape. OCLC 463251270.
- Savoye, Daniel Ferreras (2013). The Signs of James Bond: Semiotic Explorations in the World of 007. Jefferson, NC: McFarland. ISBN 978-0-7864-7056-3.
