= Diamonds Are Forever (film) =

1971 James Bond film by Guy Hamilton

- Theatrical release poster by Robert McGinnis
- Directed by: Guy Hamilton
- Screenplay by: Richard Maibaum; Tom Mankiewicz
- Based on: Diamonds Are Forever; 1956 novel by Ian Fleming
- Produced by: Harry Saltzman; Albert R. Broccoli
- Starring: Sean Connery; Jill St. John; Charles Gray; Lana Wood; Jimmy Dean; Bruce Cabot
- Cinematography: Ted Moore
- Edited by: Bert Bates; John Holmes
- Music by: John Barry
- Production company: Eon Productions Limited
- Distributed by: United Artists
- Release dates: 14 December 1971 (West Germany); 17 December 1971 (USA); 30 December 1971 (UK, premiere)
- Running time: 120 minutes
- Countries: United Kingdom; United States
- Language: English
- Budget: $7.2 million
- Box office: $116 million

Diamonds Are Forever is a 1971 spy film and the seventh film in the James Bond series produced by Eon Productions. It is the sixth and final Eon film to star Sean Connery, who returned to the role as the fictional MI6 agent James Bond, having declined to reprise the role in On Her Majesty's Secret Service (1969).

The film is based on Ian Fleming's 1956 novel and is the second of four Bond films directed by Guy Hamilton. The story has Bond impersonating a diamond smuggler to infiltrate a smuggling ring and uncovering a plot by his old enemy Ernst Stavro Blofeld to use the diamonds to build a space-based laser weapon. Bond sets out to stop the smuggling but discovers he must defeat Blofeld before he destroys Washington, D.C., in his plan to blackmail the world with nuclear supremacy.

After George Lazenby left the series, the producers Harry Saltzman and Albert R. Broccoli tested other actors, but the studio United Artists wanted Connery back, paying a then-record US$1.25 million salary for him to return. The producers were inspired by Goldfinger; as with that film, Hamilton was hired to direct, and Shirley Bassey performed the title song. Locations included Las Vegas, California, and Amsterdam. Diamonds Are Forever was a commercial success and received positive reviews upon release. It was nominated for the Academy Award for Best Sound.

Diamonds Are Forever was followed by Live and Let Die in 1973, with Roger Moore succeeding Connery as Bond.

== Plot ==
To avenge Tracy, (Note: Whose death is depicted in the previous film.) James Bond hunts Ernst Stavro Blofeld. At a facility where Blofeld lookalikes are being created through plastic surgery, Bond kills a test subject and later the "real" Blofeld.

While the assassins Mr. Wint and Mr. Kidd kill people involved in a diamond-smuggling operation, M suspects that South African diamonds are being stockpiled to depress prices by dumping and assigns Bond to uncover the smuggling ring. Impersonating the smuggler Peter Franks, Bond travels to Amsterdam to meet the contact Tiffany Case. He kills the real Franks, then switches IDs to fake his own death and assume Franks's identity. He and Tiffany go to Los Angeles, smuggling the diamonds inside Franks's corpse.

At the airport, Bond meets his Central Intelligence Agency (CIA) contact Felix Leiter and travels to Las Vegas. At a funeral home operating in the smuggling ring, Franks's body is cremated, and the diamonds are passed on to the smuggler Shady Tree. The funeral home operator, Morton Slumber, double-crosses Bond, and Wint and Kidd try to cremate him alive. However, Tree stops the process after discovering that the diamonds in Franks's body were fake, planted by Bond and the CIA. Bond tells Leiter to ship the real diamonds. At the Whyte House, a casino and hotel owned by the billionaire Willard Whyte, Tree works as a stand-up comedian but is killed by Wint and Kidd, who do not know that the diamonds were fake.

At the craps table, Bond meets a woman named Plenty O'Toole, and later brings her to his room. Slumber's henchmen ambush them, throwing O'Toole out of the window and into the pool below. Bond instructs Tiffany to retrieve the diamonds at the Circus Circus casino. Tiffany reneges on her deal and flees, passing off the diamonds to the next smuggler. However, seeing that O'Toole was killed after being mistaken for her, she changes her mind and drives Bond to the airport, where they see the diamonds given to Whyte's casino manager, Bert Saxby. Saxby later keeps a rendezvous with a scientist who takes the diamonds. The scientist goes to a remote research laboratory owned by Whyte, where a satellite is being built by a laser refraction specialist. Bond sneaks into the laboratory and, after being caught, escapes by stealing a moon buggy, fights his way out of the facility and reunites with Tiffany. Later in the evening, Bond and Tiffany evade the police in Las Vegas.

Bond climbs to the Whyte House's top floor to confront Whyte. He is instead met by two identical Blofelds, who use an electronic voice synthesiser to sound like Whyte when communicating with the outside world. Bond kills one of the Blofelds, who turns out to be a look-alike. He is then knocked out by gas, picked up by Wint and Kidd, taken out to Las Vegas Valley, placed in a pipeline and left to die. He escapes, then calls Blofeld, using another voice synthesiser to pose as Saxby. He locates Whyte's desert home, defeats bodyguards, and rescues Whyte. Meanwhile, Blofeld abducts Tiffany.

With Whyte's help, Bond raids the laboratory and uncovers Blofeld's plot to use the diamonds to create a laser satellite, which has already been sent into orbit. With the satellite, Blofeld destroys nuclear weapons installations in the United States, the Soviet Union and China, then proposes an international auction for global nuclear supremacy.

Whyte identifies an oil rig off the coast of Baja California as Blofeld's base of operations. After Bond's attempt to change the cassette containing the satellite control codes fails, Leiter and the CIA launch a helicopter attack on the rig. Blofeld tries to escape in a midget submarine, but Bond gains control of its launch crane and uses it as a wrecking ball, destroying the satellite control room, the base and presumably killing Blofeld for good.

Bond and Tiffany head for Britain on an ocean liner, where Wint and Kidd pose as room-service waiters to serve them a dinner with a time-bomb hidden in a cake. However, Bond unravels their disguise and they attack him. He sets Kidd on fire, making him jump overboard, then throws Wint overboard holding the bomb which explodes seconds after. Seeing Blofeld's satellite still in orbit in the sky, Tiffany asks Bond if they can get the diamonds back to Earth.

== Cast ==
- Sean Connery as James Bond, MI6 agent 007.
- Jill St. John as Tiffany Case, a diamond smuggler and Bond's love interest.
- Charles Gray as Ernst Stavro Blofeld: The head of SPECTRE and Bond's archenemy. Gray had previously appeared in the series when he played Henderson in 1967's You Only Live Twice.
- Lana Wood as Plenty O'Toole, a woman Bond meets at a casino.
- Jimmy Dean as Willard Whyte, an entrepreneur, loosely based on Howard Hughes.
- Bruce Cabot as Albert R. "Bert" Saxby, Whyte's casino manager who is in cahoots with Blofeld. Cabot also provided the voice of Bond when he is imitating Saxby using Q's machine. His name is a reference to the producer Albert R. Broccoli.
- Bruce Glover and Putter Smith as Mr. Wint and Mr. Kidd, Blofeld's henchmen.
- Norman Burton as Felix Leiter, a CIA agent, and Bond's ally in tracking Blofeld.
- Joseph Fürst as Professor Dr. Metz, the world's leading expert on laser refraction, a scientist on Blofeld's payroll.
- Bernard Lee as M, head of MI6.
- Desmond Llewelyn as Q, head of MI6's technical department.
- Leonard Barr as Shady Tree, a stand-up comedian and smuggler.
- Lois Maxwell as Miss Moneypenny, M's secretary.
- Margaret Lacey as Mrs. Whistler, a teacher and diamond smuggler.
- Joe Robinson as Peter Franks, a diamond smuggler whose identity is taken by Bond.
- David de Keyser as Doctor.
- Laurence Naismith as Sir Donald Munger, a diamond expert who brings the case to MI6.
- David Bauer as Morton Slumber, the president of Slumber Incorporated, a funeral home.
- Marc Lawrence and Sid Haig as Slumber Inc. attendants.

In uncredited roles, Lola Larson (a stage name used by the gymnast Mary Hiller) and Trina Parks appeared as Bambi and Thumper, Whyte's bodyguards; Shane Rimmer as Tom, the director of Whyte's astronautics facility; Ed Bishop as Klaus Hergersheimer, a scientist involved with building the satellite; Henry Rowland as Doctor Tynan, and Cassandra Peterson as a dancer. Peterson says in her autobiography that she was in the film but believes she did not make the final edit. It has been rumoured that Peterson and later star Valerie Perrine played Shady Tree's "Acorns", the showgirls who support him during his standup routine. They were actually played by the performers Jennifer Castle and Pat Gill.

== Production ==
The producers originally intended to have Diamonds Are Forever re-create commercially successful aspects of Goldfinger, including hiring the director, Guy Hamilton. Peter R. Hunt, who had directed On Her Majesty's Secret Service and worked in all previous Bond films as editor, was invited before Hamilton, but due to involvement with another project could only work on the film if the production date was postponed, which the producers declined to do. As a condition for Hamilton directing after his difficulties with trade unions during the filming of Battle of Britain, Diamonds Are Forever was the first Bond production to be based primarily in the United States rather than the United Kingdom.

=== Writing ===
While On Her Majesty's Secret Service was in post-production, Richard Maibaum wrote several drafts about Bond avenging the death of his wife Tracy. The characters Irma Bunt and Marc-Ange Draco were set to return and Bond mourning his deceased wife Tracy while Louis Armstrong's "We Have All the Time in the World" played in the background. Harry Saltzman had suggested Thailand and India as potential filming locations. When George Lazenby departed from the role prior to the film's release, a complete rewrite was requested, in addition to Maibaum's script failing to impress Albert R. Broccoli and Saltzman. Following this, Maibaum wrote an original script with Auric Goldfinger's twin seeking revenge for the death of his brother. In this version, Goldfinger's brother was a Swedish shipping magnate armed with a laser cannon held within the hull of a supertanker. The idea was borrowed from an early draft of On Her Majesty's Secret Service in which Ernst Stavro Blofeld was to be Goldfinger's twin brother, with Gert Fröbe set to return. The film would have ended with a boat chase of Chinese junks and Roman galleys on Lake Mead. The plot was later changed after Broccoli had a dream, where his close friend Howard Hughes was replaced by an imposter. Hence, the character of Willard Whyte was created, and Tom Mankiewicz was chosen to rework the script.

Mankiewicz says he was hired because Broccoli wanted an American writer to work on the script, since so much of it was set in Las Vegas "and the Brits write really lousy American gangsters" – but it had to be someone who also understood the British idiom, since it had British characters. David Picker, then-president of United Artists, had seen the stage musical Georgy written by Mankiewicz, and recommended him; he was hired on a two-week trial and kept on for the rest of the film, as well as several subsequent Bond films. The idea of Goldfinger's brother was scrapped, and Blofeld was written back into the script. Mankiewicz later estimated the novel provided around 45 minutes of the film's final running time. The adaptation eliminated the main villains from the source Ian Fleming novel, mobsters called Jack and Seraffimo Spang, but used the henchmen Shady Tree, Mr. Wint and Mr. Kidd.

=== Casting ===
George Lazenby was originally offered a contract for seven Bond films but declined and left after just one, On Her Majesty's Secret Service, on the advice of his agent Ronan O'Rahilly. Producers contemplated replacing him with John Gavin, although the actors Clint Eastwood, Adam West, Burt Reynolds, Robert Wagner, Brett Halsey, Malcolm Roberts, and Ranulph Fiennes had also been considered; Eastwood, Reynolds, and West had stated that Bond should not be played by an American actor, with West stating he was doing "something else" at the time. Reynolds would later regret the decision to turn it down, stating he "could have done that". Michael Gambon rejected an offer, telling Broccoli that he was "in terrible shape". The producers Albert R. Broccoli and Harry Saltzman wanted to cast Roger Moore, but he was busy filming The Persuaders! The singer Tom Jones stated he was considered for the role, but Broccoli felt that he was too famous and people would not have believed him as Bond.

Picker was unhappy with this decision and made it clear that Connery was to be enticed back to the role and that money was no object. When approached about resuming the role of Bond, Connery demanded the fee of $1.25 million. To entice the actor to play Bond once more, United Artists offered two back-to-back films of his choice. After both sides agreed to the deal, Connery used the fee to establish the Scottish International Education Trust, where Scottish artists could apply for funding without having to leave their country to pursue their careers. Since John Gavin was no longer in the running for the role, his contract was paid in full by United Artists. The first film made under Connery's deal was The Offence, directed by his friend Sidney Lumet.

Charles Gray was cast as villain Ernst Stavro Blofeld, after playing a Bond ally named Dikko Henderson in You Only Live Twice (1967). The jazz musician Putter Smith was invited by Saltzman to play Mr. Kidd, after a Thelonious Monk Band show. Musician Paul Williams was originally cast as Mr. Wint. When he could not agree with the producers on compensation, Bruce Glover replaced him. Glover said he was surprised at being chosen, because at first producers said he was too normal and that they wanted a deformed, Peter Lorre-like actor. Bruce Cabot, who played the part of Bert Saxby, died the following year; Diamonds turned out to be his final film role. Jimmy Dean was cast as Willard Whyte after Saltzman saw a presentation of him. Dean was very worried about playing a Howard Hughes pastiche, because he was an employee of Hughes at the Desert Inn.

Jill St. John had originally been offered the part of Plenty O'Toole but landed the female lead after Sidney Korshak, who assisted the producers in filming in Las Vegas locations, recommended his client St. John, who became the first American Bond girl. Linda Thorson met with Cubby Broccoli, hoping to be considered for the part of Case, but he never considered her for the role, although he did briefly list her as a possibility for the part of Plenty O'Toole. Some time later, Broccoli told Thorson she was never cast in a Bond film because she did not have long hair. Lana Wood was cast as Plenty O'Toole, following a suggestion of screenwriter Tom Mankiewicz. Wood modelled her performance after Leigh Taylor-Young and Minnie Mouse. Denise Perrier, Miss World 1953, played "Marie", the woman in the pre-credit beach scene whom Bond throttles with the top of her bikini to disclose the location of Blofeld. Perrier has stated she asked Connery to go a little rough on her to make the strangling look more believable, and he complied.

A cameo appearance by Sammy Davis Jr. playing on the roulette table was filmed, but his scene was eventually deleted.

Initially, the character of Miss Moneypenny did not feature, partly because Lois Maxwell had held out for a pay increase, but it was decided during production to add the scene where, disguised as a customs officer, Moneypenny gives Bond his travel documents at the port of Dover. The additional scene was a last-minute rewrite, as the producers felt it important to incorporate Maxwell after her issue was resolved. Maxwell and Connery filmed their lines separately for the short scene.

=== Filming ===
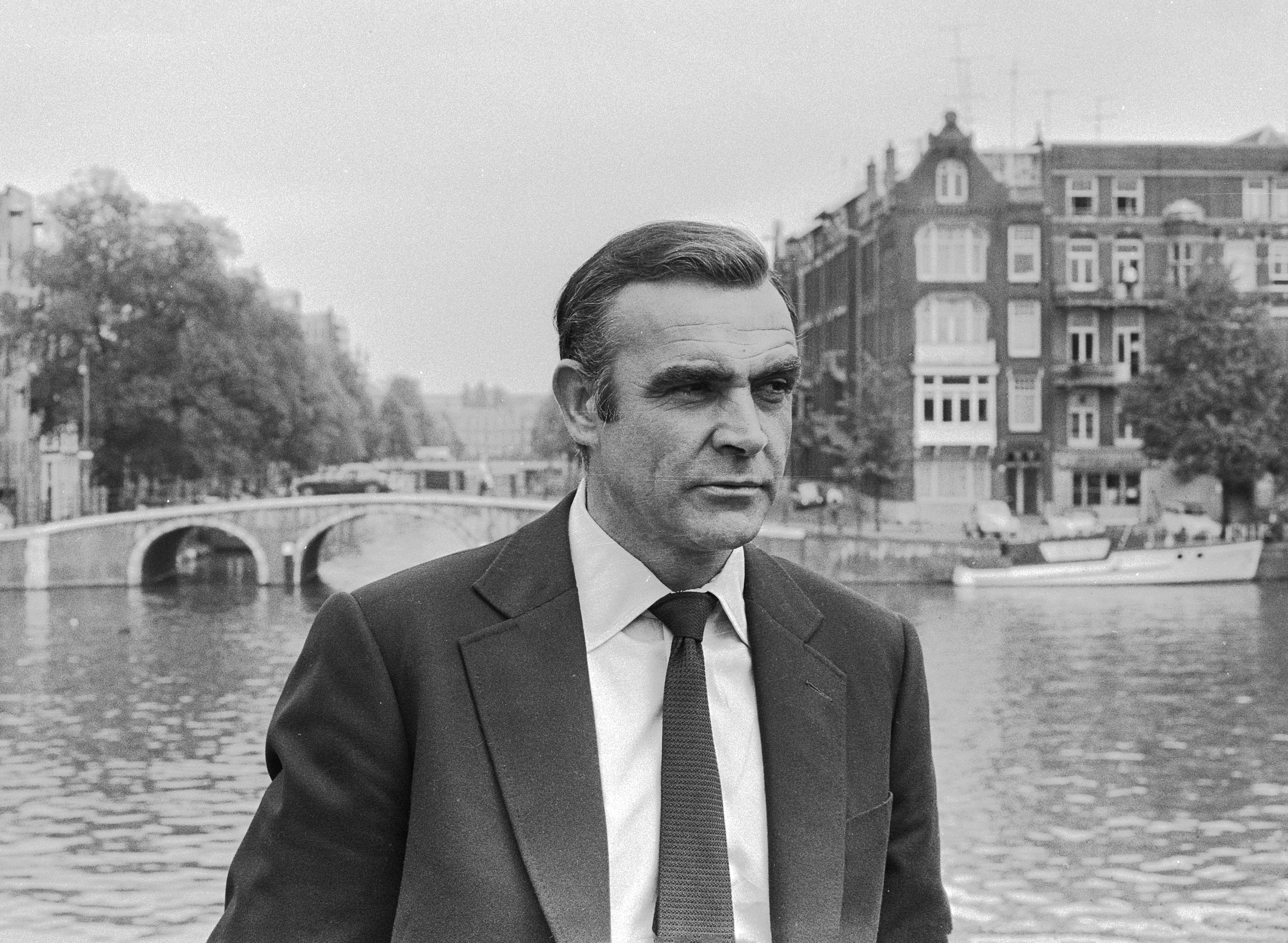
Sean Connery during filming in Amsterdam, 31 July 1971

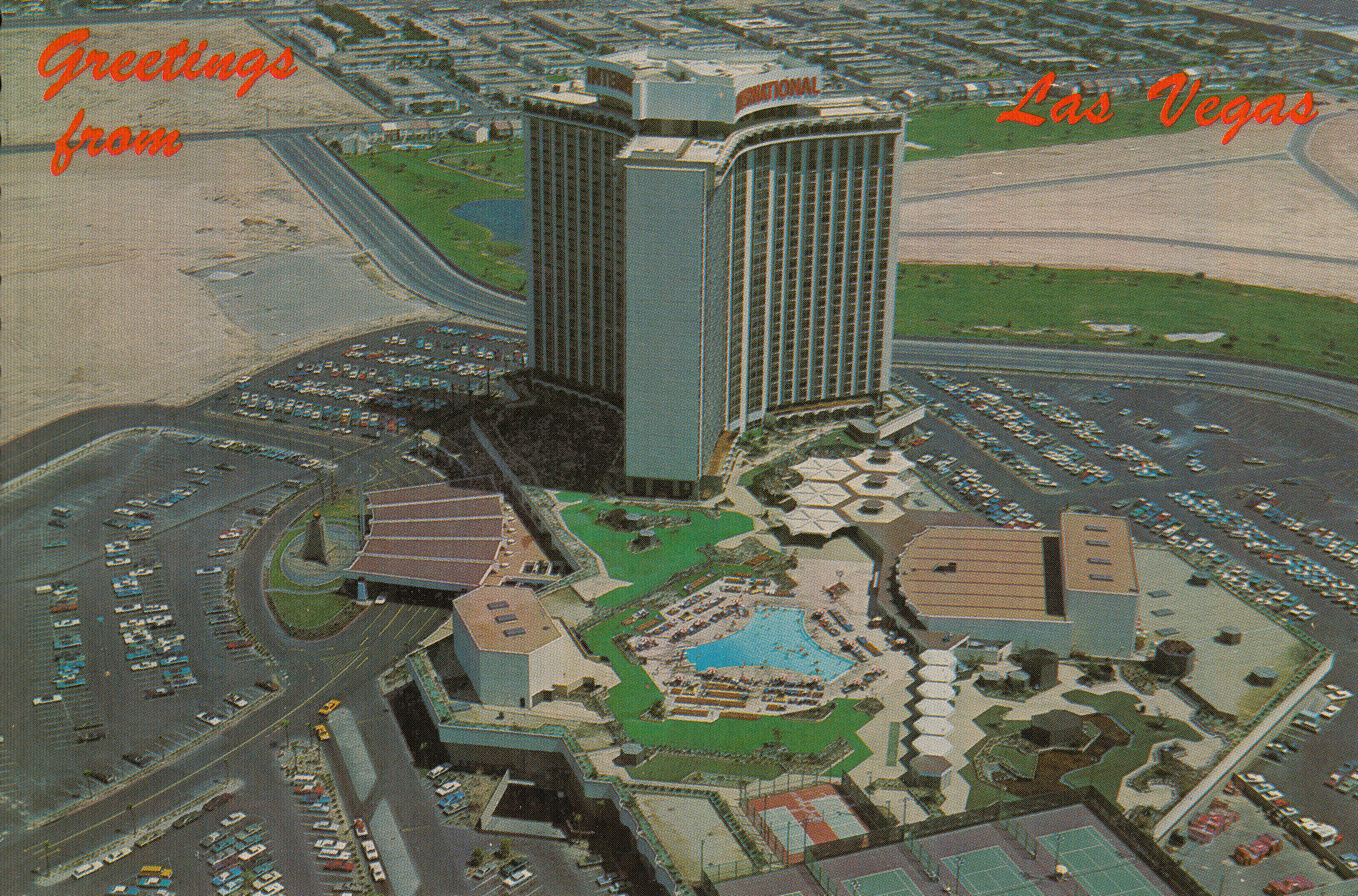
The International Hotel (now Westgate Las Vegas) doubled as The Whyte House

Filming began on 5 April 1971, with the South African scenes actually shot in the desert near Las Vegas. The scene was originally written to include Mr. Wint and Mr. Kidd killing Dr. Tynan by forcing a scorpion down his mouth, but it was rewritten in order to be approved by British censors. The film was shot primarily in the United States, with locations including Los Angeles International Airport, Universal City Studios and eight hotels of Las Vegas. Besides Pinewood Studios in Buckinghamshire, other places in England were Dover and Southampton. The climactic oil rig sequence was shot off the shore of Oceanside, California. Other filming locations included Cap D'Antibes in France for the opening scenes, Amsterdam and Frankfurt Airport. The exteriors for the finale on board the SS Canberra were filmed when the vessel was at the Port of Southampton.

Filming in Las Vegas took place mostly in hotels owned by Howard Hughes, for he was a friend of Cubby Broccoli's. Getting the streets empty to shoot was achieved through the collaboration of Hughes, the Las Vegas police, and the shopkeepers' association. The International Hotel doubled for the Whyte House, and since the owner of the Circus Circus was a Bond fan, he allowed the Circus to be used on film and even made a cameo. The cinematographers said filming in Las Vegas at night had an advantage: no additional illumination was required due to the high number of neon lights. Sean Connery made the most of his time on location in Las Vegas. "I didn't get any sleep at all. We shot every night, I caught all the shows and played golf all day. On the weekend I collapsed – boy, did I collapse. Like a skull with legs." He also played the slot machines, and once delayed a scene because he was collecting his winnings. While shooting in Las Vegas, Connery dated his co-stars Lana Wood and Jill St. John.

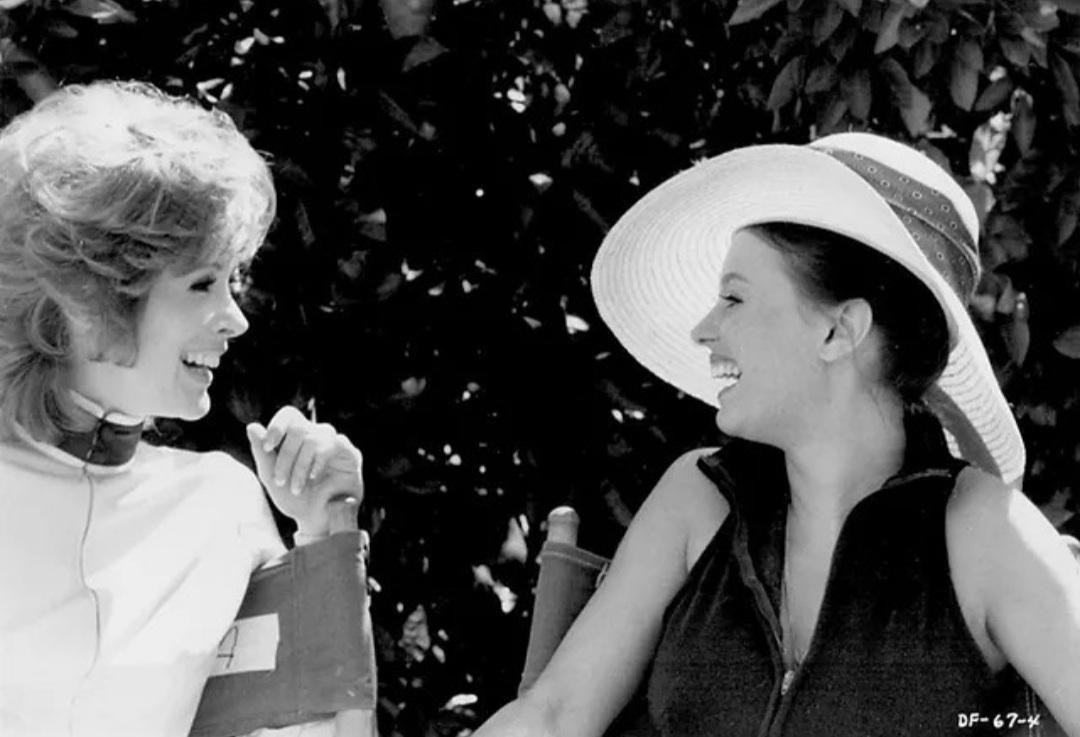
Jill St. John and Lana Wood during filming

The home of Kirk Douglas was used for the scene in Tiffany's house, while the Elrod House in Palm Springs, designed by John Lautner, became Willard Whyte's house. The exterior shots of the Slumber Mortuary were of the Palm Mortuary in Henderson, Nevada. The interiors were a set constructed at Pinewood Studios, where Ken Adam imitated the real building's lozenge-shaped stained glass window in its chapel. The Garden of Remembrance scene was shot at Palm Downtown Cemetery, Las Vegas. During location filming, Ken Adam visited several funeral homes in the Las Vegas area, and the inspiration behind the gaudy design of the Slumber Mortuary, for example the use of tasteless Art Nouveau furniture and Tiffany lamps, came from these experiences. Production wrapped with the crematorium sequence, on 13 August 1971.

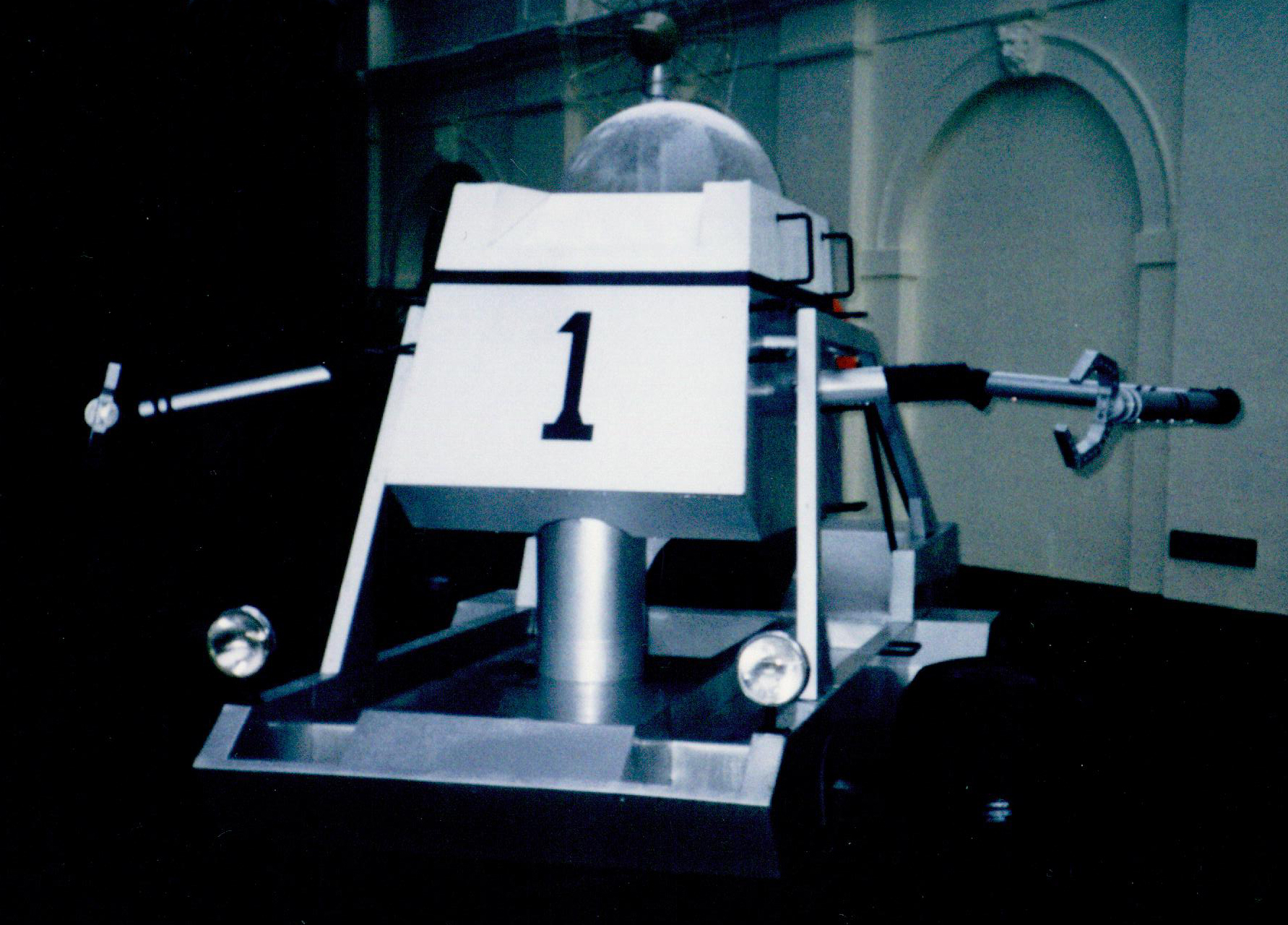
Moon Buggy from Diamonds Are Forever

Since the car chase in Las Vegas would have many car crashes, the filmmakers had a product placement arrangement with Ford to use their vehicles. Ford's only demand was that Sean Connery had to drive the 1971 Mustang Mach 1 which serves as Tiffany Case's car. A Mustang was used in Goldfinger and Thunderball, while a Mercury Cougar was used in On Her Majesty's Secret Service, and "Bond girls" drove each one. The moon buggy was inspired by the NASA lunar rover, but with additions such as flailing arms since the producers did not find the design "outrageous" enough. Built by the custom car fabricator Dean Jeffries on a rear-engined Corvair chassis, it was capable of road speeds. The fibreglass tyres had to be replaced during the chase sequence because the heat and irregular desert soil ruined them.

During a car chase scene, Bond drives a Ford Mustang up a ramp and then jumps it over several parked vehicles. The stunt driver hired for the jump could not perform it, and wrecked several cars in the process. With only one car left, the stunt team recruited the stunt driver Bill Hickman, who completed the jump in one take. A continuity mistake during the same scene appears in the finished film: when Bond drives the Mustang on two wheels through a narrow alley, the car enters the alley on its right side and exits driving on its left side.

While filming the scene of finding Plenty O'Toole drowned in Tiffany's swimming pool, Lana Wood actually had her feet loosely tied to a cement block on the bottom. Film crew members held a rope across the pool for her, with which she could lift her face out of the water to breathe between takes. The floor of the pool was sloped and the block would move deeper with each take. Eventually, Wood was submerged but was noticed by onlookers and rescued. Wood, a certified diver, took some water but remained calm during the ordeal, although she later said there had been some "very uncomfortable moments and quite some struggling until they pulled me out."

=== Music ===
The original soundtrack was once again composed by John Barry, his seventh time composing for a Bond film. The title song, "Diamonds Are Forever", was the second Bond title song to be performed by Shirley Bassey, after "Goldfinger" in 1964.

With Connery back in the lead role, the "James Bond Theme" was played by an electric guitar in the somewhat unusual, blued gun barrel sequence accompanied with prismatic ripples of light, in the pre-credits sequence, and in a full orchestral version during a hovercraft sequence in Amsterdam.

== Release and reception ==
Diamonds Are Forever was released on 14 December 1971 in Munich, West Germany, and on 16 December in Sydney and Melbourne, Australia, before opening in 44 other cities in the United States, Canada and Europe on 17 December and 11 more cities in Japan, New Zealand and Europe on 18 December 1971. It grossed $2,242,557 in its opening six days worldwide, including $1,569,249 in its opening weekend in the United States and Canada, where it finished number one at the box office for the week. The film had its UK premiere at the Odeon Leicester Square on 30 December 1971. In its first 17 days in the United States and Canada to 2 January 1972 it grossed $16,238,915 and had grossed $8,330,000 overseas to the same date, for a worldwide total of $24,568,915, which United Artists claimed was a record in such a short period. After 31 days, it had grossed a record $36,647,251.

Diamonds Are Forever was number one in the United States for seven consecutive weeks and went on to gross $116 million worldwide, of which $43 million was from the United States and Canada.

=== Contemporary reviews and accolades ===
Roger Ebert of the Chicago Sun-Times noted, in a positive review, the irrelevance of the plot and "moments of silliness", such as Bond driving a moon buggy. He praised the Las Vegas car chase scene, particularly the segment when Bond drives the Ford Mustang on two wheels. Vincent Canby of The New York Times enthusiastically praised the film as "great, absurd fun" and a "nostalgic journey" with quintessential Bond elements, including Bond's "triumphant" sexism. Peter Schjeldahl, also writing for The New York Times, described Diamonds Are Forever as "a pretty good movie – not great art, but fantastic packaging." In a review for Time, Jay Cocks said the film is "in some ways the best of the lot. It is by all odds the broadest – which is to say wackiest, not sexiest." He praised Connery as "a fine, forceful actor with an undeniable presence [who] turns his well-publicized contempt for the Bond character into some wry moments of self-parody ... whether he likes it or not, he is the perfect, the only James Bond."

Variety wrote that Bond "still packs a lethal wallop in all his cavortings" but asserted that Diamonds Are Forever does not have "the same quality or flair" as previous films. He praised the action sequences but criticized the story and felt there was a lack of suspense. In a negative review, Gene Siskel of the Chicago Tribune called Diamonds Are Forever weak. He complained about its "disjointed" script, dull female characters, and not-so-dangerous villains. Diamonds Are Forever was nominated for an Academy Award for Best Sound.

=== Retrospective reviews ===
Writing in 1986, Danny Peary called Diamonds Are Forever one of the most forgettable Bond films. He said that until the villain Blofeld reappears near the end, the film amounts to a dull melodrama without the spectacle that audiences expect from Bond. In a 1996 retrospective review for the film's 25th anniversary, James Berardinelli criticised the concept of a laser-shooting satellite and derided the performances of Jill St. John, Norman Burton and Jimmy Dean. Writing in 2007, Christopher Null called St. John's character, Tiffany Case, "one of the least effective Bond girls—beautiful, but shrill and helpless".

Total Film listed several of the supporting villains as the worst in the series—Mr. Wint and Mr. Kidd as the worst, and Bambi and Thumper as the second-worst. IGN chose Diamonds Are Forever as the third-worst James Bond film, behind The Man with the Golden Gun and Die Another Day. Diamonds Are Forever was more positively received by Xan Brooks of The Guardian, who said it was "oddly brilliant, the best of the bunch: the perfect bleary Bond film for an imperfect bleary western world."

On the review aggregator website Rotten Tomatoes, the film holds an approval rating of 64% based on 53 reviews with an average rating of 6.3/10. The website's consensus states, "Diamonds Are Forever is a largely derivative affair, but it's still pretty entertaining nonetheless, thanks to great stunts, witty dialogue, and the presence of Sean Connery."

== See also ==
- List of films set in Las Vegas
- Outline of James Bond

== Sources ==
- Mankiewicz, Tom; Crane, Robert (2012). My Life as a Mankiewicz. Lexington, KY: University Press of Kentucky. ISBN 978-0-8131-3605-9.
- Field, Matthew; Chowdbury, Ajay (2015). Some Kind of Hero: The Remarkable Story of the James Bond Films. Stroud, Gloucestershire: The History Press. ISBN 978-0-7509-6421-0. OCLC 930556527.
