= The Four Deuces =

1975 film by William H. Bushnell

- Theatrical release poster
- Directed by: William H. Bushnell
- Screenplay by: C. Lester Franklin
- Story by: Don Martin
- Produced by: Yoram Globus
- Starring: Jack Palance; Carol Lynley; Warren Berlinger; Adam Roarke; Gianni Russo; Hard Boiled Haggerty
- Cinematography: Stephen M. Katz
- Edited by: Aaron Stell
- Music by: Kenneth Wannberg
- Production company: AmeriEuro Pictures Corp
- Distributed by: Embassy Pictures
- Release date: July 3, 1975 (MIFF)
- Running time: 87 minutes
- Country: United States
- Language: English

The Four Deuces is a 1975 American crime comedy film directed by William H. Bushnell and written by C. Lester Franklin. The film stars Jack Palance, Carol Lynley, Warren Berlinger, Adam Roarke, Gianni Russo and Hard Boiled Haggerty. The film was released in January 1976, by Embassy Pictures.

== Plot ==
Gangster Vic Morano (Palance) owns the speakeasy nightclub The Four Deuces, and is embroiled in an ongoing gang war with rival mob boss and nightclub owner Chico Hamilton (Berlinger) during the 1930s Prohibition era.

== Cast ==
- Jack Palance as Vic Morono
- Carol Lynley as Wendy Rittenhouse
- Warren Berlinger as Chico Hamilton
- Adam Roarke as Russ Timmons
- Gianni Russo as Chip Morono
- Hard Boiled Haggerty as Mickey Navarro
- Johnny Haymer as Ben Arlen
- Martin Kove as Smokey Ross
- Cherie Latimer as Dolly Morono
- E.J. Peaker as Lori Rogers
- Damon Douglas as Buroughs
- Ben Frommer as George
- Mickey Morton as Book
- Jack O'Leary as Bull
- Sierra Bandit as Flame
- Robert Deman as Blade
- Carl Weathers as Taxi cab driver
- Lois Foraker as Blonde Singer
- Issac Goz as Boobury
- Lany Gustavson as Ma Hamilton
- James Jeter as Capt. 'Smitty' Baird
- David Jolliffe as Bud
- Richard Molinare as Shepherd
- Arnold Moreno as Priest Walker
- Brooke Palance as Hospital Nurse
- Rob Reece as Lake
- Robert Shayne as Vince

== Production ==
Shootings started on March 18, 1974; the film was shot at Culver City Studios and several Los Angeles locations. Carol Lynley designed all her costumes.

== Release ==
The film received a limited release between late summer and fall 1975.

== Reception ==
Author Tom Lisanti described the film as "a violent gangster yarn that tried to mix comic book humor with slam-bang action" but "just did not work".
