= Putter Smith =

American jazz bassist

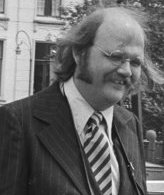
- Smith while filming Diamonds Are Forever in 1971

Background information
- Born: Patrick Verne Smith; January 19, 1941 (age 85); Bell, California, U.S.
- Genres: Jazz, cool jazz, bebop, pop, blues
- Occupations: Musician, music teacher, author, actor
- Instrument: Double bass
- Years active: 1960s–present
- Website: puttersmithmusic.com

Patrick Verne "Putter" Smith (born January 19, 1941) is an American jazz bassist, music teacher, author, and actor.

== Early life ==
Smith was born in Bell, California, near Los Angeles, and began playing the bass at the age of eight, inspired by his older brother, jazz musician Carson Smith. He made his performing debut aged 13 at the Compton Community Center.

== Career ==
He went on to perform with Thelonious Monk, Art Blakey, Duke Ellington, Billy Eckstine, Diane Schuur, Lee Konitz, Bruce Forman, Jackie and Roy, Carmen McRae, Gary Foster, Art Farmer, Blue Mitchell, Erroll Garner, Gerry Mulligan, Art Pepper, Alan Broadbent, Bob Brookmeyer, Warne Marsh, Ray Charles, Patrice Rushen, Jorge Rossy, John Mayall, Jimmy Wormworth, Mason Williams, Percy Faith, Burt Bacharach, The Manhattan Transfer, and Johnny Mathis. He works as a session musician, and has played on recordings by Beck, Smokey Hormel, Sonny and Cher, The Beach Boys, and The Righteous Brothers, among many others.

Smith taught at the Musician's Institute, and at the California Institute of the Arts.

Smith was playing with Monk at the Los Angeles jazz club Shelly's Manne-Hole when he was spotted by director Guy Hamilton, who cast him as the assassin Mr. Kidd (alongside Bruce Glover as Mr. Wint) in the 1971 James Bond film Diamonds Are Forever. He went on to have several other minor acting roles on film and television.

== Filmography ==
- Diamonds Are Forever (1971) – Mr. Kidd
- Win, Place or Steal (1974) – Kangaroo
- In the Mood (1987) – Minister
