= Felix Leiter =

Fictional character in James Bond media created 1953

- James Bond character
- First appearance: Casino Royale (1953)
- Created by: Ian Fleming
- Portrayed by: Michael Pate (as "Clarence Leiter") (1954); Jack Lord (1962); Cec Linder (1964); Rik Van Nutter (1965); Norman Burton (1971); David Hedison (1973 & 1989); Bernie Casey (1983); John Terry (1987); Jeffrey Wright (2006, 2008 & 2021)

In-universe information
- Gender: Male
- Occupation: CIA operative DEA agent Private investigator
- Spouses: Della Leiter (née Churchill) (wife, deceased)
- Children: Cedar Leiter (daughter); Kelsey Leiter (daughter)
- Nationality: American
- Classification: Ally

Felix Leiter is a fictional character created by Ian Fleming in the James Bond books, films, and other media. The character is an operative for the CIA and James Bond's friend. After losing a leg and a hand to a shark attack, Leiter joined the Pinkerton Detective Agency. The name "Felix" comes from the middle name of Fleming's friend Ivar Bryce, while the name "Leiter" was the surname of Fleming's friend Marion Oates Leiter Charles, the then wife of Thomas Leiter.

Leiter also appeared in novels by continuation authors, as well as ten films and one television episode, "Casino Royale", in which the character became a British agent, Clarence Leiter, played by Michael Pate. In the Eon Productions series of films, Leiter has been portrayed by Jack Lord, Cec Linder, Rik Van Nutter, Norman Burton, David Hedison, John Terry, and Jeffrey Wright; in the independent production Never Say Never Again, the part was played by Bernie Casey. Leiter has also appeared in the video game 007 Legends voiced by Demetri Goritsas.

== Novels ==
Felix Leiter, James Bond's CIA ally and friend, played a part in six of the Ian Fleming novels; he is introduced in Casino Royale as being thin, tall, about 35 years old and a former U.S. Marine who was working with the Joint Intelligence Staff of NATO. Kerstin Jütting describes Leiter as "a cool and quiet no-nonsense character who knows 007's strengths and weaknesses well". Physically, Fleming describes Leiter in Casino Royale: "a mop of straw-coloured hair lent his face a boyish look which closer examination contradicted".

Leiter is Bond's saviour in Casino Royale, providing him with 32 million francs when Bond has been cleaned out by SMERSH paymaster Le Chiffre, calling it "Marshall aid". Media historian James Chapman notes that Bond's relationship with Leiter represented the Special Relationship between Britain and America, although the American Leiter is in the subordinate position to the British Bond. Academic Jeremy Black agrees, although points out that the Bond and Leiter relationship suggested "a far smoother working of the Anglo-American alliance than was in fact the case." Academic and writer Kingsley Amis, in his exploration of Bond in The James Bond Dossier, considered that this view of Leiter was partly because of Fleming's writing, noting that "Leiter, such a nonentity as a piece of characterization ... he, the American, takes orders from Bond, the Britisher, and that Bond is constantly doing better than he". Bond scholars Bennett and Woollacott note that although the two men share adventures, it is Bond who leads, not Leiter. Leiter's role is to "suppl[y] Bond with technical support and hardware, add ... muscle where needed and money".

Fleming's second novel, Live and Let Die, reveals that in his early twenties, Leiter wrote a few pieces on Dixieland jazz for the New York Amsterdam News. He is kidnapped by the novel's villain, Mr. Big, who feeds him to a great white shark. Bond scholar John Griswold notes that in the original draft of the story, Fleming killed Leiter off in the shark attack; when Naomi Burton, Fleming's US agent with Curtis Brown, protested about the death of the character, Fleming relented and Leiter lived, albeit missing an arm and half a leg. Espionage scholar Rupert Allason, writing as Nigel West, noted that Leiter's involvement in a domestic U.S. matter was a breach of the CIA's charter, as laid out in the National Security Act of 1947.

After the shark attack, Leiter returned in Diamonds Are Forever with a hook for his missing hand and a prosthetic leg; as he had lost his gun hand, he was no longer with the CIA, but employed as a private detective by Pinkerton Detective Agency, although he was on the reserve of the CIA and was recalled for Goldfinger, Thunderball and The Man with the Golden Gun. Fleming had flown to the US in August 1954 to research the background to Diamonds Are Forever; his friend Ernest Cuneo introduced him to a rich socialite, William Woodward Jr., who drove a Studillac—a Studebaker with a powerful Cadillac engine. According to Bond scholar Henry Chancellor, "the speed and comfort of it impressed Ian, and he shamelessly appropriated this car" for Leiter to drive in the novel.

For the post-Fleming continuation Bond authors, Leiter has also appeared on a periodic basis. After John Gardner took over writing the James Bond novel series, Leiter made an occasional appearance and the novel For Special Services introduces his daughter, Cedar Leiter, who is also a CIA officer (and briefly Bond's romantic conquest). Raymond Benson also included Leiter's character in some of his novels, including The Facts of Death and Doubleshot. The 2008 Sebastian Faulks novel Devil May Care and the 2011 novel Carte Blanche by Jeffery Deaver both contain the character.

On March 26, 2025, Ian Fleming Publications announced the first-ever Felix Leiter novel, written by Raymond Benson. The Hook and the Eye will be set in Fleming's 1950s timeline and published first as a serial e-book followed by a print publication in 2025.

== Television ==
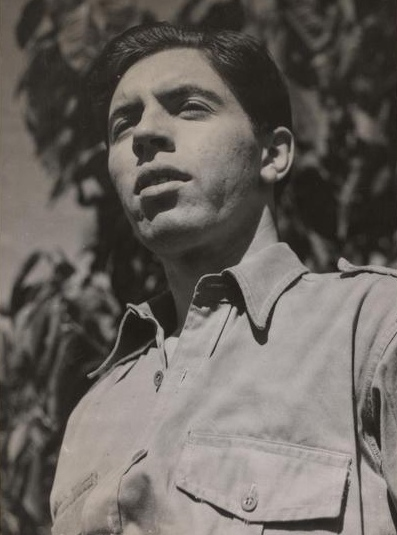
Michael Pate: "Clarence Leiter" from the British Secret Service.

=== Michael Pate: 1954 ===
The first screen interpretation of the Leiter character was in the 1954 CBS one-hour television adventure "Casino Royale", broadcast as part of the dramatic anthology series Climax Mystery Theater, which ran between October 1954 and June 1958. For the American audience the Bond character from Casino Royale was re-cast as an American agent—"Card Sense" Jimmy Bond, played by Barry Nelson—described as working for "Combined Intelligence", supported by the British agent, Clarence Leiter; "thus was the Anglo-American relationship depicted in the book reversed for American consumption", according to Jeremy Black. Leiter, who was an agent for Station S, was a combination of the novel's Felix Leiter and René Mathis and was played by the Australian actor Michael Pate.

== Films ==
=== Eon Productions films ===
Film	Year	Portrayed by
Dr. No	1962	Jack Lord
Goldfinger	1964	Cec Linder
Thunderball	1965	Rik Van Nutter
Diamonds Are Forever	1971	Norman Burton
Live and Let Die	1973	David Hedison
The Living Daylights	1987	John Terry
Licence to Kill	1989	David Hedison
Casino Royale	2006	Jeffrey Wright
Quantum of Solace	2008	Jeffrey Wright
No Time to Die	2021	Jeffrey Wright

==== Jack Lord: 1962 ====
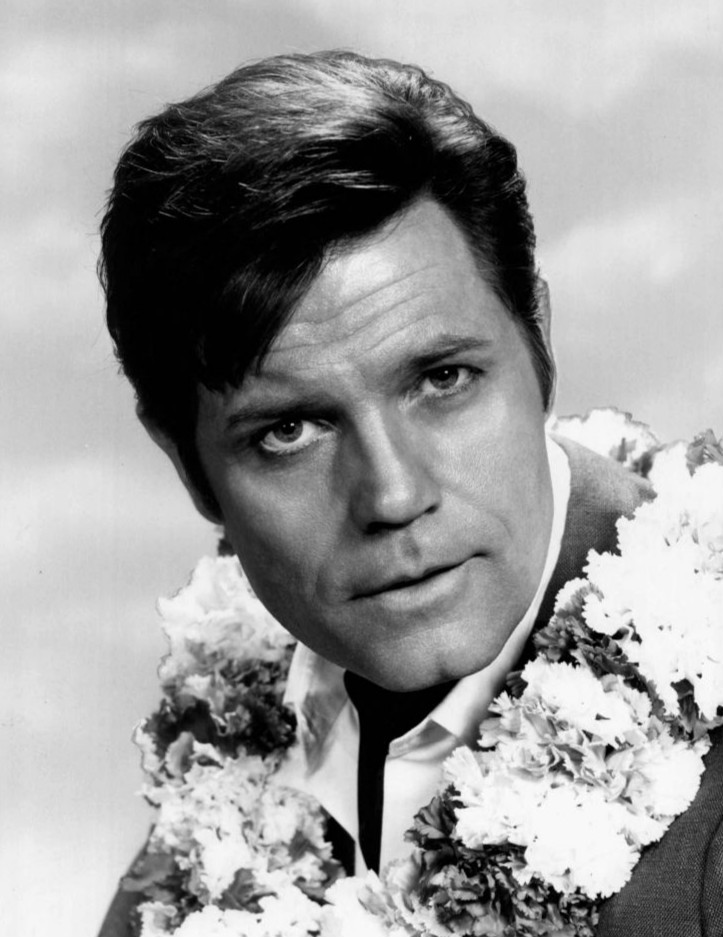
Jack Lord (pictured in 1968), the first actor of the role, appeared in only Dr. No (1962).

Jack Lord was the first Felix Leiter, appointed into the role for the first Bond film, Dr. No. Eon Productions started filming the series out of the order written by Fleming (Fleming had started with Casino Royale, with Dr. No being the sixth novel). Leiter was not present in the Fleming novel, but the writers added the character to the film. Bond scholars Jim Smith and Stephen Lavington consider Leiter to offer negligible help to Bond (Sean Connery), largely because there is no role for him in the novel, a point with which continuation Bond author Raymond Benson agrees, noting that he is "extraneous to the dramatic action". Jeremy Black agrees, although points out that the inclusion of Leiter was a sign of American influence in the Caribbean.

Lord played Leiter in a "swaggering" fashion, according to Smith and Lavington, and they considered him "excellent, an effective American version of James Bond." Bond scholars Lee Pfeiffer and Dave Worrall agree, stating that Lord's was "one of the most satisfying portrayals of Leiter".

Featured in

- Dr. No (1962)

==== Cec Linder: 1964 ====
When the role of Leiter was brought back for the third Bond film, Goldfinger, in 1964, Lord was again approached to play Leiter; according to screenwriter Richard Maibaum, Lord demanded co-star billing with Connery, a bigger role and more money to reprise the role. The producers instead decided to recast the role, initially with Austin Willis. At the last minute, Cec Linder switched roles with Willis, who was recast as Mr. Simmons, one of Auric Goldfinger (Gert Fröbe)'s opponents in a card game. Linder was the only actor actually on location in Miami. Raymond Benson considers that Linder was "miscast" as Leiter because he looked too old: "he looks like Bond's uncle rather than his best friend."

Featured in

- Goldfinger (1964)

==== Rik Van Nutter: 1965 ====
The fourth film in the Eon series, Thunderball, was the third to portray Leiter and the producers chose a third actor to play the role, Rik Van Nutter. Van Nutter was married to Swedish actress Anita Ekberg at the time and the couple had dined with Albert and Dana Broccoli after Ekberg had appeared in the Eon-produced Call Me Bwana. Van Nutter was subsequently offered the Leiter role without an audition, although he did have screen tests with some of the Bond girls.

According to Pfeiffer and Worrall, Leiter had a more proactive role in Thunderball and Van Nutter was "an inspired choice for the role". Smith and Lavington agree and consider that Van Nutter's "relaxed and charming performance works well." Benson also concurs, but complains that although Van Nutter is a piece of successful casting, "the script ... does not give the character any real depth".

Featured in

- Thunderball (1965)

==== Norman Burton: 1971 ====
For the 1971 instalment, Diamonds Are Forever, Eon chose Norman Burton. Burton's Leiter was more amusing and more exasperated than the previous incarnations of the role.

Raymond Benson again considers that the Leiter role was miscast and considered Burton to be "overweight and too old for the role". Smith and Lavington describe him as "an elderly, portly man in a government-issue suit ... anonymous, orthodox". Pfeiffer and Worrall agree, thinking that Burton was "the least likely incarnation" of Leiter.

Featured in

- Diamonds Are Forever (1971)

==== David Hedison: 1973, 1989 ====
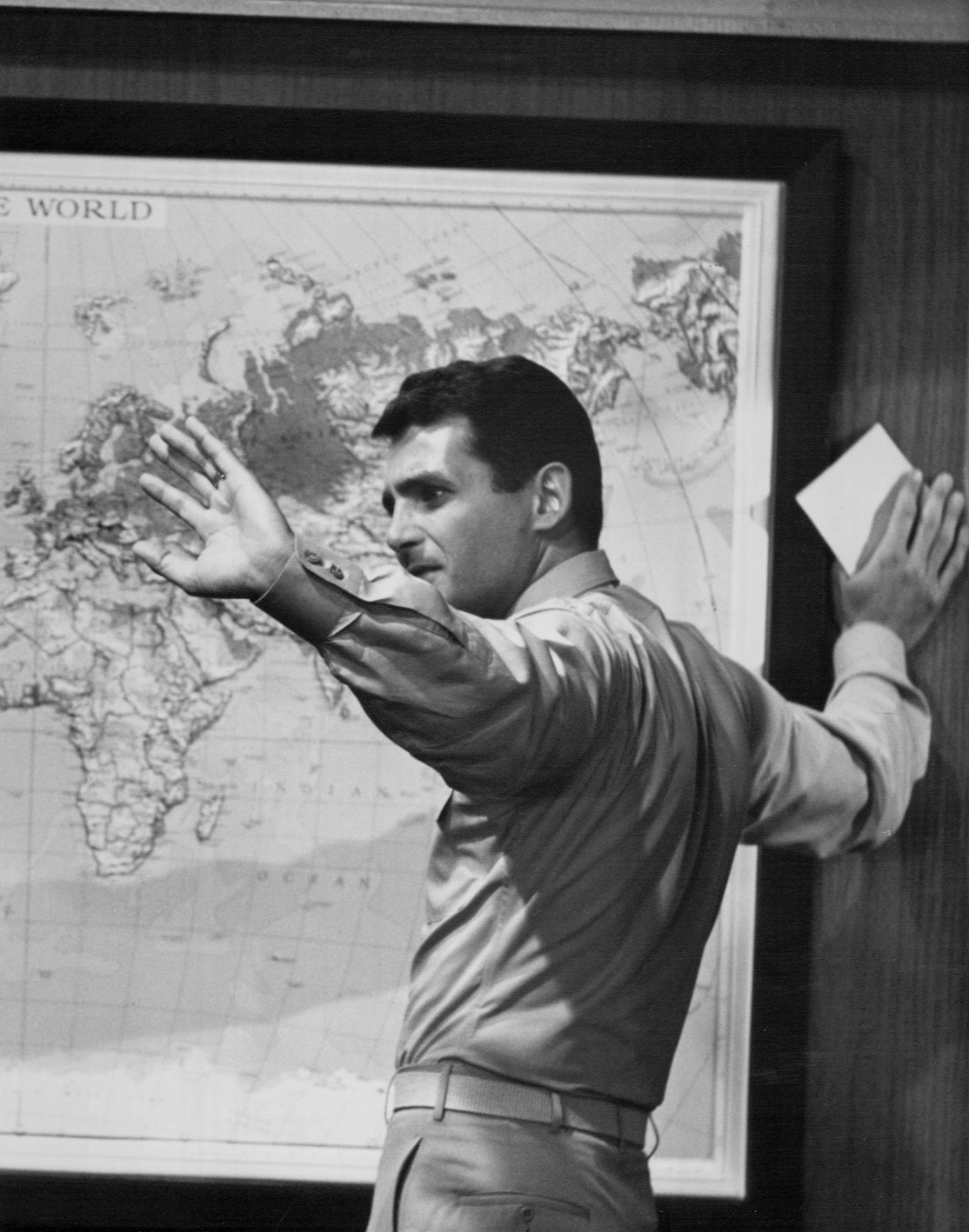
David Hedison portrayed Leiter in Live and Let Die and Licence to Kill

In 1973 the Bond franchise introduced a new main lead, Roger Moore, who played Bond for the next 12 years in seven films. David Hedison, an old friend of Moore's, was cast as Leiter in Live and Let Die. Pfeiffer and Worrall consider that this friendship comes through, with "genuine chemistry" between the two actors. Raymond Benson thought Hedison miscast, but acknowledged that "he's the best Leiter next to Rik Van Nutter."

Hedison returned to play Leiter 16 years later in Licence to Kill and after another actor had also been in the role. Hedison did not expect to return to the role, saying "I was sure that ... [Live and Let Die] would be my first – and last" and director John Glen was reluctant to cast the 61-year-old actor for the physically demanding role, which even included a parachuting scene. Hedison was the only actor to play Leiter in more than one film until Jeffrey Wright appeared in Casino Royale, Quantum of Solace and No Time to Die

Leiter, now working with the DEA, is central to the plot of Licence to Kill. He and Bond (Timothy Dalton) work together to capture the drug lord Franz Sanchez (Robert Davi) on the way to Leiter's wedding to Della Churchill (Priscilla Barnes), at which Bond serves as best man. After Sanchez escapes, he orders his men to murder Della and torture Leiter by lowering him into a tank containing a great white shark — an event transferred from the original plot of Live and Let Die. Bond finds Leiter maimed but alive, and seeks revenge on Sanchez, paving the way for the rest of the film's plot. At the film's end, Leiter is shown recovering in the hospital.

Featured in

- Live and Let Die (1973)
- Licence to Kill (1989)

==== John Terry: 1987 ====
Following Hedison's first outing in 1973 in Live and Let Die, the Leiter role did not appear again until the 1987 film The Living Daylights, by which time Bond was being played by Timothy Dalton; the role was taken up by John Terry.

Smith and Lavington consider that, although the scene between Bond and Leiter sees warmth in the relationship between them, "it is too fleeting to have any impact". Pfeiffer and Worrall agree on the briefness of Leiter's role in the film, although they consider that Terry has "virtually no chemistry with Dalton".

Featured in

- The Living Daylights (1987)

==== Jeffrey Wright: 2006–2021 ====
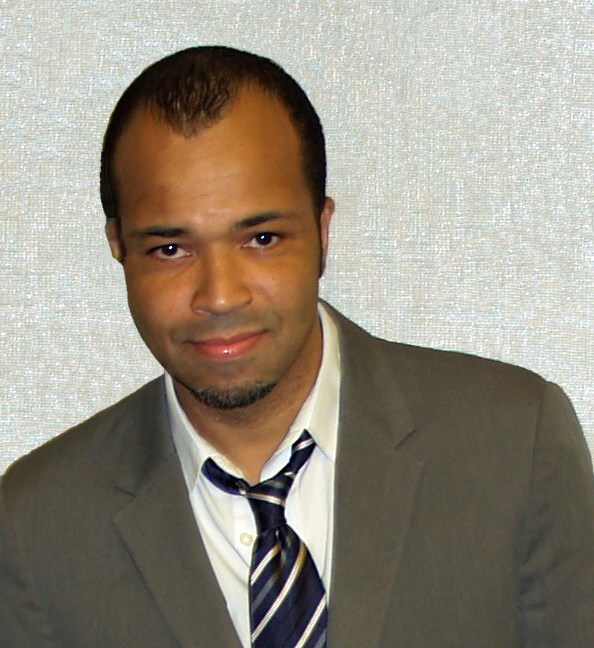
Jeffrey Wright (pictured in 2007), the incumbent actor of the role

Casino Royale rebooted the series, which allowed Leiter to re-appear; he and Bond meet for the first time in the film. This version of the character is revealed to be from Milwaukee. As in the novel, he goes undercover to a high-stakes card game with Bond (Daniel Craig) and Le Chiffre (Mads Mikkelsen), but quickly loses his money. He prevents Bond from killing Le Chiffre, and offers to stake Bond back-in, in exchange for letting the CIA take custody of Le Chiffre.

He appeared again in Quantum of Solace, in which he reluctantly helps his corrupt superior Gregg Beam (David Harbour) pursue Bond at the behest of Quantum leader Dominic Greene (Mathieu Amalric); he redeems himself, however, by helping Bond locate Greene and foil his plan to steal Bolivia's water rights. At the end of the film, M (Judi Dench) mentions that Beam has been fired and Leiter has replaced him. Early script drafts for Quantum of Solace gave Wright a larger role, but his screen time was restricted by on-set rewrites.

Bond mentions Leiter in Spectre as a friend he has called upon for help in hiding Lucia Sciarra (Monica Bellucci), the widow of Marco Sciarra (Alessandro Cremona), a SPECTRE agent whom the terrorist group is trying to assassinate. However, Leiter himself did not appear in the film.

The character (as portrayed by Wright) makes his final appearance in No Time to Die, in which he asks the retired Bond's help in finding Valdo Obruchev (David Dencik), a missing MI6 scientist who was kidnapped by terrorist Lyutsifer Safin (Rami Malek)'s men. Bond agrees, but he and Leiter are betrayed by Leiter's CIA colleague Logan Ash (Billy Magnussen), a double agent working for Safin. Ash shoots and mortally wounds Leiter, who dies in Bond's arms. Later on in the film, Bond avenges Leiter by killing Ash.

Featured in

- Casino Royale (2006)
- Quantum of Solace (2008)
- No Time to Die (2021)

=== Non-Eon films ===
==== Bernie Casey: 1983 ====
Bernie Casey as Felix Leiter from Never Say Never Again.

In 1983, Kevin McClory, one of the original writers of the novel Thunderball, produced Never Say Never Again, a re-make of the 1965 film Thunderball. McClory's rights to the film were held separate to those of Eon Productions, although he had been the producer for the first Thunderball adaptation. The film marked the return of Sean Connery to the Bond role; he spoke with Bernie Casey, saying that as the Leiter role was never remembered by audiences, casting a Black actor as Leiter might make the character more memorable. Smith and Lavington consider Casey to be "the most compelling Felix Leiter since Jack Lord", although again there was little in the script for him to do.

Featured in

- Never Say Never Again (1983)

== Video games ==
In the 2012 game 007 Legends, Canadian-American actor Demetri Goritsas provided his likeness and voice for the character of Leiter.

== Comics ==
Felix Leiter has made several appearances in multiple comic strips as well as comic books as a supporting character aiding Bond on joint assignments, some of them being adaptations of the novels and the films, while others maintaining original storylines. He briefly makes an appearance in Permission to Die (1989), later returning in A Silent Armageddon (1992), playing a rather large role in The Quasimodo Gambit (1995), a brief comeback in Eidolon (2016), and at the latest, in Black Box (2017).

In January 2017, Dynamite Comics published the first issue of a miniseries starring Felix, written by James Robinson and illustrated by Aaron Campbell, simply titled, Felix Leiter.

== Analysis ==
In The New York Times, Thomas Vinciguerra has referred to Leiter as James Bond's "sidekick" and documented that his evolving character has paralleled Bond's fortunes as both a cinematic icon and a hero of the Cold War and its aftermath.

== Bibliography ==
- Amis, Kingsley (1966). The James Bond Dossier. London: Pan Books. OCLC 752401390.
- Barnes, Alan; Hearn, Marcus (2001). Kiss Kiss Bang! Bang!: the Unofficial James Bond Film Companion. Batsford Books. ISBN 978-0-7134-8182-2.
- Bennett, Tony; Woollacott, Janet (1987). Bond and beyond: the political career of a popular hero. Oxford: Macmillan Education. ISBN 978-0-333-28620-3.
- Benson, Raymond (1988). The James Bond Bedside Companion. London: Boxtree Ltd. ISBN 978-1-85283-233-9.
- Black, Jeremy (2005). The politics of James Bond: from Fleming's novel to the big screen. University of Nebraska Press. ISBN 978-0-8032-6240-9.
- Chancellor, Henry (2005). James Bond: The man and his world. London: John Murray. ISBN 978-0-7195-6815-2.
- Chapman, James (2009). Licence to Thrill: A cultural history of the James Bond films. New York: I.B. Tauris. ISBN 978-1-84511-515-9.
- Cork, John; Stutz, Collin (2007). James Bond encyclopedia. London: Dorling Kindersley. ISBN 978-1-4053-3427-3.
- Dunbar, Brian (2001). Goldfinger. London: Longman. ISBN 978-0-582-45249-7.
- Griswold, John (2006). Ian Fleming's James Bond: annotations and chronologies for Ian Fleming's Bond stories. AuthorHouse. ISBN 1-4259-3100-6.
- Jütting, Kerstin (2007). "Grow Up, 007!" – James Bond over the decades: formula vs. innovation. GRIN Verlag. ISBN 978-3-638-85372-9.
- Lane, Andy; Simpson, Paul (2000). The Bond Files: An Unofficial Guide to the World's Greatest Secret Agent. London: Virgin Books. ISBN 978-0-7535-0712-4.
- Lipp, Deborah (2006). The Ultimate James Bond Fan Book. New York: Sterling & Ross Publishers. ISBN 978-0-9766372-8-8.
- Lycett, Andrew (1996). Ian Fleming. London: Phoenix. ISBN 978-1-85799-783-5.
- Moore, Roger (2008). My Word is My Bond. London: Michael O'Mara Books. ISBN 978-1-84317-318-2.
- Pfeiffer, Lee; Worrall, Dave (1998). The essential Bond. London: Boxtree Ltd. ISBN 978-0-7522-2477-0.
- Rubin, Steven Jay (2003). The complete James Bond movie encyclopedia. New York: McGraw-Hill. ISBN 0-07-141246-8.
- Simpson, Paul (2002). The rough guide to James Bond. Rough Guides. ISBN 978-1-84353-142-5.
- Smith, Jim; Lavington, Stephen (2002). Bond films. London: Virgin Books. ISBN 978-0-7535-0709-4.
- West, Nigel (2010). Historical dictionary of Ian Fleming's world of intelligence: fact and fiction. Lanham, Maryland: Scarecrow Press. ISBN 978-0-7524-2896-3.
