= Live and Let Die (soundtrack) =

Soundtrack album by George Martin
- Released: 2 July 1973
- Recorded: 1972–73
- Studio: AIR (London)
- Length: 31:14
- Label: United Artists
- Producer: George Martin

George Martin chronology
London by George (1967)	Live and Let Die (1973)	Beatles to Bond and Bach (1978)

Singles from Live and Let Die
- 1. "Live and Let Die" Released: 1 June 1973

Live and Let Die is the soundtrack to the eighth James Bond film of the same name, scored by George Martin. The title song was written by Paul and Linda McCartney and performed by Paul McCartney and Wings. It was the first Bond film score to not involve John Barry.

== History ==
The music for most of the James Bond films up until Diamonds Are Forever in 1971 had been scored by John Barry. Due to Barry's work on the musical Billy, and having fallen out with Bond producer Harry Saltzman over the last title song sung by Shirley Bassey, Barry was unavailable to score Live and Let Die.

Producers Saltzman and Albert Broccoli approached Paul McCartney to write the theme song and McCartney in turn asked George Martin to record it for him. Impressed with the orchestration for the finished track by Paul McCartney and Wings, "Live and Let Die", Saltzman and Broccoli considered Martin for the film's score.

Martin worked closely with director Guy Hamilton who described what the music should convey in each scene as it unfolds. Only very minor changes to the finished score were asked for by Hamilton. Martin felt that this was as much for Hamilton's accurate briefing.

The orchestra was conducted by Martin and recorded at AIR Studios. The soundtrack was also released in quadrophonic.

== Title song ==
Having recorded McCartney's performance, Martin was taken aback when Saltzman asked him who he thought should sing the film's title song, suggesting to him Thelma Houston. Saltzman had envisaged a female soul singer. Martin said that it should be McCartney. The recording contract had specified that McCartney would "perform the title song under the opening titles". Martin nonetheless scored a soul arrangement to accompany singer B. J. Arnau for a nightclub sequence in the film.

Live and Let Die was the first time that a rock music arrangement was used to open a Bond film. It was also the first time that McCartney and Martin had worked together since Abbey Road in 1969. McCartney had been considered as title song composer for the previous Bond film, Diamonds Are Forever. The song was nominated for an Academy Award for Best Original Song at the 46th Academy Awards but lost to "The Way We Were" from the film of the same name.

The ″Live and Let Die" single was a major success in the U.S. and UK and continues to be a highlight of McCartney's live shows. Chrissie Hynde covered the song for future Bond composer David Arnold's 1997 compilation album Shaken and Stirred: The David Arnold James Bond Project.

== Track listing ==
The original soundtrack LP ended with track 14, "James Bond Theme", and this version was released on CD in 1988. The digitally remastered CD re-release, 2003, as well as adding eight additional tracks, extended several of the original ones, such as "Bond Meets Solitaire". Except as noted, all tracks composed by George Martin. In 2023, La La Land Records released a 2 disc expanded edition for the 50th anniversary of the movie.

=== 1973 release ===
1. "Live and Let Die (Main Title) (Paul and Linda McCartney)" – Paul McCartney and Wings
2. "Just a Closer Walk with Thee (Trad. Arr. Milton Batiste) /New Second Line (Milton Batiste)" – Harold A. "Duke" Dejan & The Olympia Brass Band
3. "Bond Meets Solitaire" (Note: contains the "James Bond Theme", originally composed for the Dr. No soundtrack)
4. "Whisper Who Dares"
5. "Snakes Alive"
6. "Baron Samedi's Dance of Death"
7. "San Monique"
8. "Fillet of Soul – New Orleans/Live and Let Die/Fillet of Soul – Harlem" – B. J. Arnau
9. "Bond Drops In"
10. "If He Finds It, Kill Him"
11. "Trespassers Will Be Eaten"
12. "Solitaire Gets Her Cards"
13. "Sacrifice"
14. "James Bond Theme" (Monty Norman)

=== 2003 release ===
1. "Live and Let Die (Main Title) (Paul and Linda McCartney)" – Paul McCartney and Wings
2. "Just a Closer Walk with Thee (Trad. Arr. Milton Batiste) /New Second Line (Milton Batiste)" – Harold A. "Duke" Dejan & The Olympia Brass Band
3. "Bond Meets Solitaire"
4. "Whisper Who Dares"
5. "Snakes Alive"
6. "Baron Samedi's Dance of Death"
7. "San Monique"
8. "Fillet of Soul – New Orleans/Live and Let Die/Fillet of Soul – Harlem" – B. J. Arnau
9. "Bond Drops In"
10. "If He Finds It, Kill Him"
11. "Trespassers Will Be Eaten"
12. "Solitaire Gets Her Cards"
13. "Sacrifice"
14. "James Bond Theme" (Monty Norman)
15. "Gunbarrel/Snakebit"
16. "Bond to New York"
17. "San Monique (Alternate)"
18. "Bond and Rosie"
19. "The Lovers"
20. "New Orleans"
21. "Boat Chase"
22. "Underground Lair"

=== 2023 release ===
==== Disc 1 ====
1. "Gun Barrel / Voodoo Ceremony" (1:30)
2. "Live and Let Die (Main Title)" (Performed by Paul McCartney and Wings) (3:11)
3. "Bond to New York" (1:26)
4. "Whisper Who Dares" (1:44)
5. "Oh Cult Voodoo Shop" (1:18)
6. "James Bond Theme (Film Version)" (1:45)
7. "Bond Meets Solitaire (Extended Version)" (2:54)
8. "Baron Samedi's Dance of Death (Film Version)" (1:43)
9. "San Monique" (1:58)
10. "Snakes Alive (Film Version)" (2:41)
11. "Bond and Rosie" (1:04)
12. "Fortune Telling" (0:46)
13. "Rosie Flees" (2:05)
14. "Bond Drops In (Film Version)" (0:55)
15. "The Lovers" (2:18)
16. "If He Finds It, Kill Him" (1:21)
17. "Low Bridge" (0:59)
18. "New Orleans" (1:02)
19. "Just a Closer Walk with Thee / New Second Line" (Performed by Harold A. “Duke” Dejan & The Olympia Brass Band) (2:19)
20. "Fillet of Soul – New Orleans / Live and Let Die / Fillet of Soul" – Harlem (Performed by B.J. Arnau) (3:18)
21. "Bond's Watch" (0:58)
22. "Solitaire Gets Her Cards" (1:51)
23. "Trespassers Will Be Eaten (Extended Version)" (2:49)
24. "Boat Chase" (2:04)
25. "Sacrifice (Film Version)" (3:22)
26. "Underground Lair" (4:01)
27. "On the Train / Finale" (3:04)

==== Disc 2 ====
1. "Live and Let Die (Main Title)" (Performed by Paul McCartney and Wings) (3:11)
2. "Just a Closer Walk with Thee / New Second Line" (Performed by Harold A. “Duke” Dejan & The Olympia Brass Band) (2:19)
3. "Bond Meets Solitaire" (2:16)
4. "Whisper Who Dares" (1:44)
5. "Snakes Alive" (2:28)
6. "Baron Samedi's Dance Of Death" (1:14)
7. "San Monique" (1:58)
8. "Fillet of Soul – New Orleans / Live and Let Die / Fillet of Soul – Harlem" (Performed by B.J. Arnau) (3:18)
9. "Bond Drops In" (3:28)
10. "If He Finds It, Kill Him" (1:21)
11. "Trespassers Will Be Eaten" (2:46)
12. "Solitaire Gets Her Cards" (1:51)
13. "Sacrifice" (2:31)
14. "James Bond Theme" (1:29)
15. "San Monique (Early Version)" (2:47)
16. "Boat Chase Pt. 1 (Early Version)" (1:51)
17. "Fillet of Soul – New Orleans / Live and Let Die / Fillet of Soul – Harlem (Alternate)" (Performed by B.J. Arnau) (3:19)
18. "Underground Lair (Alternate Opening)" (0:37)
19. "Sacrifice (Extended Album Version)" (3:22)
20. "Baron Samedi's Dance of Death (Extended Album Version)" (1:43)

== See also ==
- Outline of James Bond
