= List of Jane Seymour performances =

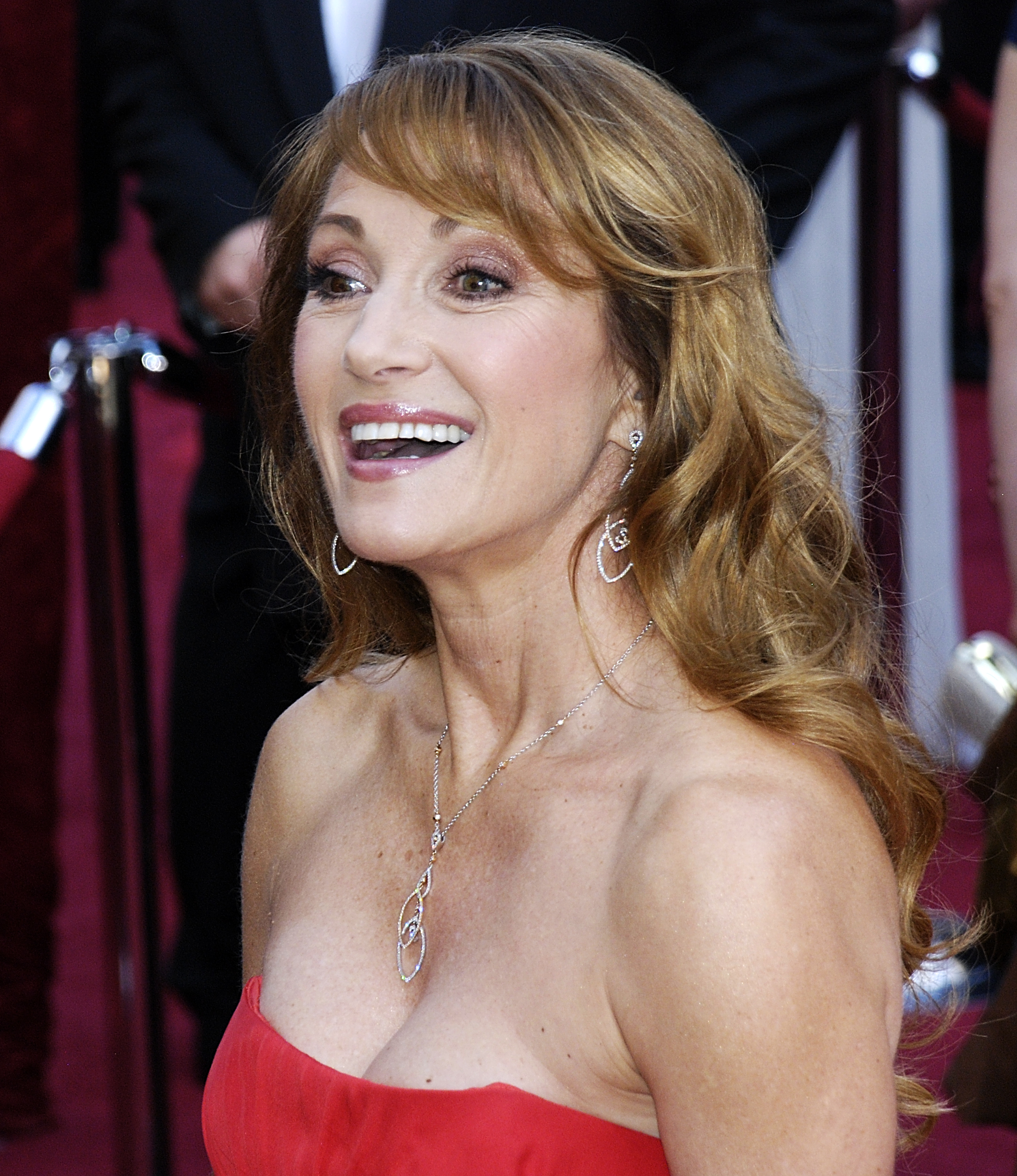
Jane Seymour at the 82nd Academy Awards in 2010.

Jane Seymour is an English-American actress. She rose to prominence in a leading role in the television series The Onedin Line (1972–1973) and as Bond girl Solitaire in the James Bond film Live and Let Die (1973). From 1993 to 1998, Seymour starred as Dr. Michaela Quinn in the television series Dr. Quinn, Medicine Woman, earning her two Primetime Emmy Award nominations and four Golden Globe nominations, winning once in 1995. For her role in the miniseries Captains and the Kings (1976), Seymour was awarded the Primetime Emmy Award for Outstanding Lead Actress in a Limited Series or Movie. In 1982, Seymour won her first Golden Globe for Best Actress in a Miniseries or Television Film for the miniseries East of Eden (1981). She received additional Golden Globe nominations in the same category for the television film The Woman He Loved (1988), in which she portrayed Wallis Simpson, and the miniseries War and Remembrance (1988–1989), for which she was nominated twice consecutively in addition to receiving another Emmy nomination. By this time, Seymour had won a Primetime Emmy Award for Outstanding Supporting Actress in a Limited Series or Movie for Onassis: The Richest Man in the World (1988), in which she played Maria Callas.

Seymour's other notable roles include in the films Somewhere in Time (1980), The Scarlet Pimpernel (1982), La Révolution française (1989), and Wedding Crashers (2005), as well as recurring roles in Battlestar Galactica (1978), Smallville (2004-2005), The Kominsky Method (2019, 2021) and B Positive (2021-2022).

== Filmography ==
=== Film ===
Year	Title	Role	Notes
1969	Oh! What a Lovely War	Chorus Girl	Uncredited
1970	The Only Way	Lillian Stein	
1972	Young Winston	Pamela Plowden	
1973	The Best Pair of Legs in the Business	Kim Thorn	
1973	Live and Let Die	Solitaire	
1973	Frankenstein: The True Story	Agatha/Prima	
1976	To Die... To Sleep... Perchance to Dream	Luisa	
1976	The Devil’s Model	Christine	
1977	Sinbad and the Eye of the Tiger	Princess Farah	
1977	Killer on Board	Jan	
1978	The Four Feathers	Ethne Eustace	
1978	Battlestar Galactica	Serina	
1980	Oh! Heavenly Dog	Jackie Howard	
1980	Somewhere in Time	Elise McKenna	Nominated—Saturn Award for Best Actress
1984	Lassiter	Sara Wells	
1986	Head Office	Jane Caldwell	
1988	El Túnel (The Tunnel)	Maria Iribarne	
1989	La Révolution française	Marie Antoinette	
1994	Count on Me	Unknown	
1997	California	Dr. Michaela 'Mike' Quinn	
1998	A Marriage of Convenience	Chris Winslow	
1998	Quest for Camelot	Lady Juliana	Voice
1998	The New Swiss Family Robinson	Anna Robinson	
2002	Touching Wild Horses	Fiona Kelsey	
2005	Wedding Crashers	Kathleen Cleary	
2006	The Beach Party at the Threshold of Hell	President Lauren Coffey	
2006	Blind Dating	Dr. Evans	
2007	After Sex	Janet	
2008	Dear Prudence	Prudence Macintyre	
2009	Wake	Mrs. Reitman	
2009	The Velveteen Rabbit	Sarah	Voice
2009	The Assistants	Sandy Goldman	
2011	Perfectly Prudence	Prudence Macintyre	
2011	Love, Wedding, Marriage	Betty	
2011	The Family Tree	Grandma Ilene	
2012	Freeloaders	Carolyn	
2012	Lake Effects	Vikki Tisdale	
2013	Austenland	Mrs. Wattlesbrook	
2013	An American Girl: Saige Paints the Sky	Miriam "Mimi" Copeland	
2014	Love by Design	Vivien	
2015	Bereave	Evelyn	
2015	About Scout	Gloria Prescott	
2016	Fifty Shades of Black	Claire	Nominated—Golden Raspberry Award for Worst Supporting Actress
2016	High Strung	Oksana	
2017	Becoming Bond	Maggie	
2017	Sandy Wexler	Cindy Marvelle	
2017	Pray for Rain	Olivia Gardner	
2017	The Female Brain	Cheryl	
2017	Just Getting Started	Delilah	
2018	Better Start Running	Mary Linson	
2018	Mistrust	Veronica Malloy	
2018	Little Italy	Corinne	
2018	High Strung: Free Dance	Oksana	
2018	Buttons: A Christmas Tale	Mrs. Browning	
2020	The War with Grandpa	Diane	
2020	Friendsgiving	Helen	
2022	Ruby's Choice	Ruby	
2022	A Christmas Spark	Molly	
2023	Puppy Love	Diane Matthews	
2024	Irish Wish	Rosemary Kelly	

=== Television movies ===
Year	Title	Role	Notes
1976	The Story of David	Bathsheba	
1977	Benny and Barney: Las Vegas Undercover	Margie Parks	
1977	Seventh Avenue	Eva Meyers	
1978	Love's Dark Ride	Diana	
1979	Dallas Cowboys Cheerleaders	Laura Cole	
1982	The Scarlet Pimpernel	Marguerite Blakeney	
1983	The Phantom of the Opera	Maria Gianelli/Elena Korvin	
1983	Jamaica Inn	Mary Yellan	
1983	The Haunting Passion	Julia Evans	
1984	Dark Mirror	Leigh Cullen/Tracy Cullen	
1984	The Sun Also Rises	Brett Ashley	
1985	Obsessed with a Married Woman	Diane Putnam	
1986	Crossings	Hillary Burnham	
1987	The Grand Knockout Tournament	Herself	Television special
1988	Keys to Freedom	Gillian	
1988	The Woman He Loved	Wallis Simpson	Nominated—Golden Globe Award for Best Actress in a Miniseries or Motion Picture Made for Television
1988	Onassis: The Richest Man in the World	Maria Callas	Primetime Emmy Award for Outstanding Supporting Actress in a Miniseries or a Special
1988	Jack the Ripper	Emma Prentiss	
1990	Angel of Death	Laura Hendricks	
1990	Matters of the Heart	Hadley Norman	
1991	Passion	Amanda Brooks	
1991	Memories of Midnight	Catherine Alexander	
1992	Are You Lonesome Tonight?	Adrienne Welles	
1992	Sunstroke	Teresa Winters	
1993	Praying Mantis	Linda Crandell	
1993	Heidi	Fräulein Rottenmeier	
1994	A Passion for Justice: The Hazel Brannon Smith Story	Hazel Brannon Smith	
1997	The Absolute Truth	Alison Reed	
1998	A Marriage of Convenience	Chris Winslow Whitney	
1999	A Memory in My Heart	Rebecca Vega	
1999	Dr. Quinn, Medicine Woman: The Movie	Dr. Michaela 'Mike' Quinn	
2000	Murder in the Mirror	Dr. Mary Kost Richland	
2000	Enslavement: The True Story of Fanny Kemble	Fanny Kemble Butler	
2000	Yesterday's Children	Jenny Cole/Mary Sutton	
2001	Blackout	Kathy Robbins	
2001	Dr. Quinn, Medicine Woman: The Heart Within	Dr. Michaela 'Mike' Quinn	
2002	Heart of a Stranger	Jill Maddox	
2008	Dear Prudence	Prudence Macintyre	
2013	Lovestruck: The Musical	Harper Hutton	
2013	An American Girl: Saige Paints the Sky	Mimi	
2014	Unknown Heart	Sally Haynes	
2014	A Royal Christmas	Isadora, Queen of Cordinia	

== Television ==
Year	Title	Role	Notes
1970	Here Come the Double Deckers	Alice	Episode: "Scooper Strikes Out"
1972	The Pathfinders	Shelia Conway	Episode: "Fly There, Walk Back"
1972	The Strauss Family	Karolin	4 episodes
1972	The Onedin Line	Emma Callon	10 episodes
1973	Orson Welles Great Mysteries	Veronique d' Aubray	Episode: "The Leather Funnel"
1975	The Hanged Man	Laura Burnett	Episode: "Ring of Return"
1976	Our Mutual Friend	Bella Wilfer	6 episodes
1976	Captains and the Kings	Marjorie Chisholm Armagh	4 episodes Nominated—Primetime Emmy Award for Outstanding Lead Actress in a Limited Series
1977	McCloud	Nidavah Ritzach	Episode: "The Great Taxicab Stampede"
1978	The Awakening Land	Genny Luckett	3 episodes
1978	Battlestar Galactica	Serina	5 episodes
1981	East of Eden	Cathy/Kate Ames	3 episodes Golden Globe Award for Best Actress in a Miniseries or Motion Picture Made for Television
1981	BBC2 Playhouse	—N/a	Episode: "Last Summer's Child"
1988–1989	War and Remembrance	Natalie Henry	12 episodes Nominated—Golden Globe Award for Best Actress in a Miniseries or Motion Picture Made for Television (1988–1989); Nominated—Primetime Emmy Award for Outstanding Lead Actress in a Miniseries or a Special
1993–1998	Dr. Quinn, Medicine Woman	Dr. Michaela "Mike" Quinn	149 episodes Golden Globe Award for Best Actress in a Television Series – Drama (1995); Nominated—Golden Globe Award for Best Actress - Television Series Drama (1993–1994, 1996); Nominated—People's Choice Award for Favorite Female Television Performer (1993); Nominated—Primetime Emmy Award for Outstanding Lead Actress in a Drama Series (1994, 1998); Nominated—Screen Actors Guild Award for Outstanding Performance by a Female Actor in a Drama Series (1994, 1996); Nominated—Viewers for Quality Television Award for Best Actress in a Quality Drama Series (1993–1994, 1997–1998)
1997	Diagnosis: Murder	Herself	Episode: "Must Kill TV"
1998	Dharma & Greg	Herself	Episode: "Dharma's Tangled Web"
1998-2000	Roxanne's Best Christmas Ever	Roxanne	movie
1999	Healthy Living	14 episodes	
2004	Law & Order: Special Victims Unit	Debra Connor	Episode: "Families"
2004–2005	Smallville	Genevieve Teague	6 episodes
2006	Modern Men	Dr. Victoria Stangel	7 episodes
2006	How I Met Your Mother	Professor Lewis	Episode: "Aldrin Justice"
2006	Justice	Karen Patterson	Episode: "Filicide"
2007	In Case of Emergency	Donna	3 episodes
2007	Agatha Christie's Marple	Rachel Argyle	Episode: "Ordeal by Innocence"
2008	My Name Is Earl	Jane Seymour	Episode: "Sold a Guy a Lemon Car"
2009	The Quitter Show	Mother	3 episodes
2011	Castle	Gloria Chambers	Episode: "One Life to Lose"
2012	Once Upon a Christmas	Narrator	Special
2012–2013	Franklin & Bash	Colleen Bash	2 episodes
2013	Ben and Kate	Wendy	Episode: "B-Squad"
2013	Newsreaders	Claire Clatter	Episode: "Unborn Again"
2014	Men at Work	Bridget	Episode: "Gigo-Milo"
2014	Back in the Game	Mrs. Crosby	Episode: "Who's on First"
2014	Rosamunde Pilcher	Sally Haynes	Episode: "Unknown Heart"
2014	Forever	Maureen Delacroix	Episode: "The Ecstasy of Agony"
2015–2016	Jane the Virgin	Amanda Elaine	3 episodes
2016	Hooten & the Lady	Lady Lindo-Parker	3 episodes
2018	Let's Get Physical	Janet	8 episodes
2018	I Feel Bad	Chewey's Mom	Episode: "My Kid Has to Grow Up"
2019	The Hypnotist's Love Story	Anne	Episode: "Pilot"
2019, 2021	The Kominsky Method	Madelyn	7 episodes Nominated—Screen Actors Guild Award for Outstanding Performance by an Ensemble in a Comedy Series (2019)
2021–2022	B Positive	Bette	Recurring role; 14 episodes
2022	The Guardians of Justice	Addison Walker	Main Role; 7 episodes
2022–present	Harry Wild	Harry Wild	Main Role, also Executive Producer
2025	Twelve Dates 'Til Christmas	Evelyn	Main Role; 6 episodes
