= Bottoms Up Club =

Girlie bar in Hong Kong

- 露臀夜總會
- Interactive map of Bottoms Up Club
- Address: 14 Hankow Road (1971–2004); 37–39 Lockhart Road (2004–2009); Hong Kong; China
- Coordinates: 22.2966°N 114.1710°E
- Type: Nightclub

Construction
- Opened: March 1971
- Closed: July 2009

The Bottoms Up Club (Chinese: 露臀夜總會) was a girlie bar in Hong Kong. The bar became famous for its appearance in the 1974 James Bond film The Man with the Golden Gun. The interior of the club evoked the interior of the club as seen in the film.

== History ==
The Club opened in the basement of Mohan's Building at 14 Hankow Road in Tsim Sha Tsui, Kowloon, in March or May 1971. One of its early managers was Pat Sephton, a former Windmill model. A 1994 court ruling requested it to remove its naked-buttocks neon sign, and to have its naked dancers wear bras or negligees. The Tsim Sha Tsui location closed in April 2004. Rising rents were cited as possible reasons for the closure. The Club re-opened at the first floor of David House, 37–39 Lockhart Road in Wan Chai in May 2004, this time mainly as a sports bar, with one of the original bars being recreated in a back room.

In July 2009 the club closed down.

== In popular culture ==
During the filming of The Man with the Golden Gun in 1974, the club was located in Tsim Sha Tsui, on the Kowloon side of Victoria Harbour. This gave rise to a movie blooper when James Bond, played by Roger Moore, is picked up outside the club by British agents posing as police, and is told he is being taken to a police station in Kowloon West Division, when he is in fact already there.

According to a former employee, while the film features footage of the exterior of the Club, the scenes inside the Club were actually filmed in a studio in the United Kingdom, where it had been recreated.

The club also appeared in the 1994 Wong Kar-wai movie Chungking Express. Takeshi Kaneshiro and Brigitte Lin have drinks there before going to a hotel room.

The club appears also in the book Zero Minus Ten by Raymond Benson (1997) where James Bond meets Sunni Pei (consume girl and striptease dancer), a member of the Hong Kong mafia "The Triads".
