= Garden Road =

Garden Road may refer to:

- Garden Road stop, the lower terminus of the Peak Tram line, Hong Kong
- Garden Road, Hong Kong, on Hong Kong Island
- Hankow Road, formerly Garden Road, in Tsim Sha Tsui, Kowloon, Hong Kong
- "Garden Road", an unreleased song by Rush intended for inclusion on the 1974 album Rush
