= The Man with the Golden Gun (film) =

1974 James Bond film by Guy Hamilton

- Theatrical release poster by Robert McGinnis
- Directed by: Guy Hamilton
- Screenplay by: Richard Maibaum; Tom Mankiewicz
- Based on: The Man with the Golden Gun; 1965 novel by Ian Fleming
- Produced by: Albert R. Broccoli; Harry Saltzman
- Starring: Roger Moore; Christopher Lee; Britt Ekland
- Cinematography: Ted Moore; Oswald Morris
- Edited by: Raymond Poulton; John Shirley
- Music by: John Barry
- Production company: Eon Productions Limited
- Distributed by: United Artists
- Release dates: 18 December 1974 (United States); 20 December 1974 (London)
- Running time: 125 minutes
- Countries: United Kingdom; United States
- Language: English
- Budget: $7 million
- Box office: $97.6 million

The Man with the Golden Gun is a 1974 spy film, the ninth in the James Bond series produced by Eon Productions and the second to star Roger Moore as the fictional MI6 agent James Bond. A loose adaptation of Ian Fleming's posthumously published 1965 novel of the same name, the film has Bond sent after the Solex Agitator, a breakthrough technological solution to contemporary energy shortages, while in a game of cat and mouse facing the assassin Francisco Scaramanga, the "Man with the Golden Gun". The action culminates in a duel between them that settles the fate of the Solex.

The Man with the Golden Gun was the fourth and final film in the series directed by Guy Hamilton. The script was written by Richard Maibaum and Tom Mankiewicz. The film was set in the face of the 1973 energy crisis, a dominant theme in the script; Britain had still not yet fully overcome the crisis when the film was released in December 1974. The film also reflects the then-popular martial arts film craze, with several kung fu scenes and a predominantly Asian location, being set and shot in Thailand, Hong Kong, and Macau. Part of the film is also set in Beirut, Lebanon, but it was not shot there.

The film received mixed reviews from critics, who described it as the lowest point in the canon up to that time. Christopher Lee's portrayal of Scaramanga as a villain of similar skill and ability to Bond was praised, but reviewers criticised the film as a whole, particularly its comedic approach as well as Roger Moore's and Britt Ekland's performances. Whilst profitable, the film is the fourth lowest-grossing in the series, and its relatively modest returns by comparison with those of Live and Let Die (1973) reportedly placed the continuation of the franchise in jeopardy.

The Man with the Golden Gun was the last Bond film to be co-produced by Harry Saltzman, who sold his 50% stake in Danjaq, LLC, the parent company of Eon Productions, after the release of the film. The series would go on a hiatus until The Spy Who Loved Me in 1977.

== Plot ==
An American gangster, Rodney, visits famed crack shot hitman Francisco Scaramanga to kill him and collect a bounty, but he is directed into a funhouse section of the estate, where Scaramanga eventually retrieves his golden gun and kills him.

In London, a golden bullet etched with "007" is received by MI6; it is believed to have been sent by Scaramanga. Because no one knows of his appearance outside of having a third nipple, M relieves Bond of his current mission involving the location of a solar energy scientist named Gibson.

At a hint from Moneypenny, Bond sets out unofficially to locate Scaramanga, first by retrieving a spent golden bullet from a belly dancer in Beirut. He traces this to a gun maker in Macau, and forces him to reveal how he ships the bullets. Bond follows the shipment carried to Hong Kong by Andrea Anders, Scaramanga's girlfriend. In her Peninsula Hotel room, he coerces her to expose information about Scaramanga, his appearance and his plans. She directs Bond to the Bottoms Up Club where Scaramanga kills Gibson when he steps outside, and Scaramanga's dwarf assistant Nick Nack steals a small device called the Solex Agitator off his body. Bond, who had pulled out his pistol outside the club, is arrested by Hong Kong police lieutenant Hip. However, instead of going to the station, he is transported to the wreck of RMS Queen Elizabeth in the harbour where he meets M and Q, and is assigned to work with Hip to retrieve the Solex.

Bond travels to Bangkok to meet Hai Fat, a wealthy Thai entrepreneur suspected of arranging Gibson's murder. He poses as Scaramanga by showing off a fake third nipple and is invited to dinner, but his plan backfires because, unbeknownst to him, Scaramanga himself is operating at Fat's estate. Bond is captured and taken to Fat's martial arts academy, where the students duel to the death and then are instructed to kill him, and he battles high-grade scholar Chula. Escaping with the aid of Hip and his nieces, Bond speeds away on a long-tail boat along the river and reunites with his assistant, Mary Goodnight. Scaramanga subsequently kills Fat with his golden gun and assumes control of his empire and the Solex.

Anders reveals to Bond that she sent the bullet to London. She wants him to kill Scaramanga, and promises to give him the Solex as they spend the night together. At a Muay Thai event the next day, Bond finds Anders sitting and staring silently, dead from a bullet to the heart. Scaramanga arrives and introduces himself to Bond, but Bond is able to smuggle the Solex to Hip, who gives it to Goodnight. When she follows Nick Nack to place a homing device on Scaramanga's car, Scaramanga traps her in its boot. Bond discovers Scaramanga driving off and steals an AMC Hornet from a showroom to give chase, coincidentally with the holidaying J.W. Pepper sitting inside. The chase concludes when Scaramanga's AMC Matador hides in a building and then transforms into a plane that flies off.

Tracking Goodnight's homing beacon, Bond takes an RC-3 Seabee seaplane and flies to Scaramanga's island in the Red Chinese waters. Scaramanga shows Bond the solar power plant facility that he has obtained from Hai Fat, the technology for which he intends to sell to the highest bidder. While demonstrating the equipment, Scaramanga uses the solar-powered energy beam to destroy Bond's seaplane, preventing him from escaping.

During lunch, Scaramanga proposes a pistol duel with Bond on the beach. With Nick Nack officiating, the two men take twenty paces, but when Bond turns and fires, Scaramanga has vanished. Nick Nack leads Bond into Scaramanga's manor and funhouse section. Bond eventually outwits and kills Scaramanga by posing as his mannequin. Goodnight kills Scaramanga's security chief Kra, whose fall into a liquid helium vat causes the plant's temperature to spiral out of control. Bond retrieves the Solex unit just before the plant is destroyed, and they escape unharmed in Scaramanga's Chinese junk. After fending off a final attack by Nick Nack, he romances Goodnight.

== Cast ==
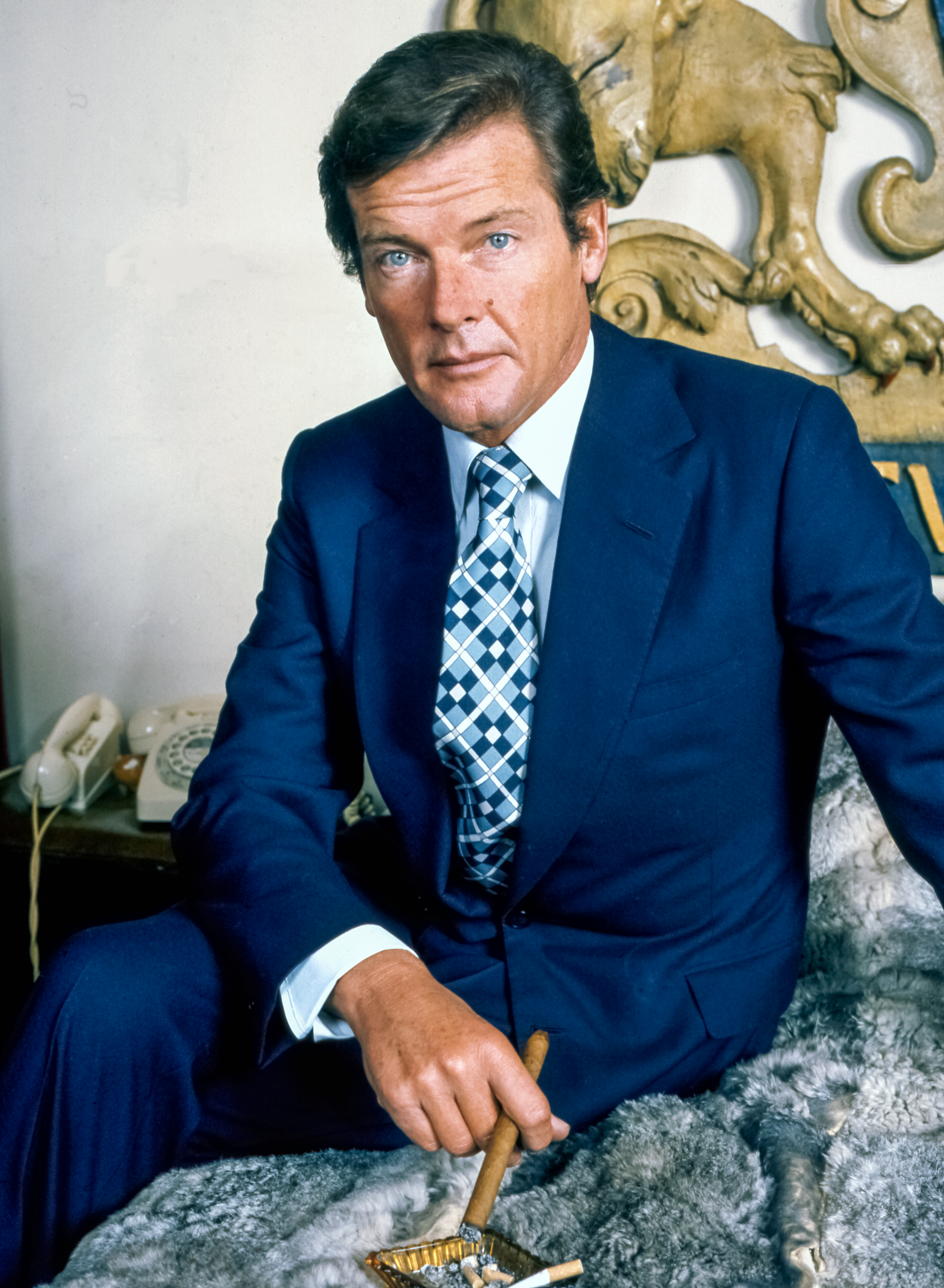
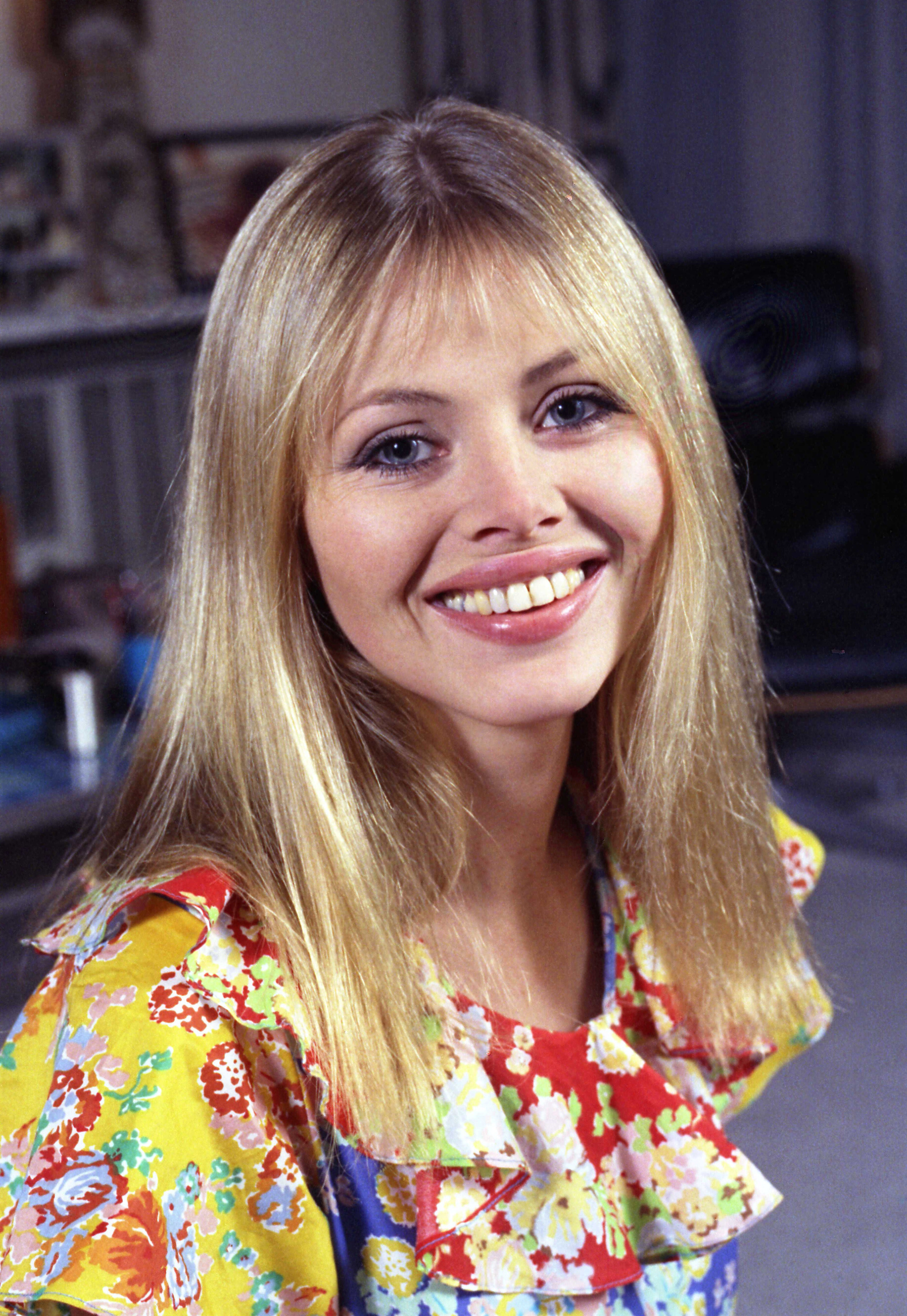
Roger Moore (left) in 1973, Christopher Lee in 1959 and Britt Ekland in 1972
- Roger Moore as James Bond – 007, an MI6 agent who receives a golden bullet, supposedly from Scaramanga, indicating that he is a target of Scaramanga.
- Christopher Lee as Francisco Scaramanga, an assassin who is identified by his use of a golden gun; he also has a 'superfluous papilla', or supernumerary nipple. Scaramanga plans to misuse solar energy for destructive purposes. Lee was Ian Fleming's step-cousin and regular golf partner. Scaramanga has been called "the best-characterised Bond villain yet."
- Britt Ekland as Mary Goodnight, Bond's assistant who is also a British agent.
- Maud Adams as Andrea Anders, Scaramanga's girlfriend. Adams described the role as "a woman without a lot of choices: she's under the influence of this very rich, strong man, and is fearing for her life most of the time; and when she actually rebels against him and defects is a major step." The Man with the Golden Gun was the first of two Bond films in which Maud Adams appeared; she played a different character, Octopussy, in the 1983 film of the same name: rumours that she also had a cameo as an extra in Roger Moore's last Bond film, A View to a Kill, are untrue.
- Hervé Villechaize as Nick Nack, Scaramanga's manservant and accomplice with dwarfism. Villechaize was later known to television audiences as Tattoo in the series Fantasy Island.
- Clifton James as Sheriff J.W. Pepper, a Louisiana sheriff who happens to be on holiday in Thailand. Hamilton liked Pepper in the previous film, Live and Let Die, and asked Mankewicz to write him into The Man with the Golden Gun as well.
- Richard Loo as Hai Fat, a Thai millionaire industrialist who was employing Scaramanga to assassinate the inventor of the "Solex agitator" (a revolutionary solar energy device) and steal the device. He himself is later killed by Scaramanga. This was Loo's final film role before his death in 1983.
- Soon-Taik Oh as Lieutenant Hip, Bond's local contact in Hong Kong and Bangkok. Soon-Taik Oh trained in martial arts for the role, and his voice was partially dubbed over.
- Marc Lawrence as Rodney, an American gangster who attempts to outshoot Scaramanga in his funhouse, and loses, being shot in the head by Scaramanga. Lawrence also appeared in Diamonds Are Forever.
- Lois Maxwell as Miss Moneypenny, M's secretary.
- Marne Maitland as Lazar, a Portuguese gunsmith based in Macau who manufactures golden bullets for Scaramanga.
- Desmond Llewelyn as Q, the head of MI6's technical department.
- James Cossins as Colthorpe, an MI6 armaments expert who identifies the maker of Scaramanga's golden bullets. The first draft of the script originally called the role Boothroyd until it was realised that was also Q's name and it was subsequently changed.
- Chan Yiu-lam as Chula, the black-belt student at Hai Fat's dojo
- Bernard Lee as "M", the head of MI6.
- Carmen Sautoy as Saida, a Beirut belly dancer. Saida was originally written as overweight and wearing excessive make-up, but the producers decided to cast a woman closer to the classic Bond girl.
- Francoise Therry as Chew Mee, Hai Fat's mistress, whom Bond memorably finds swimming nude in a swimming pool. She is voiced by Nikki van der Zyl, who has voiced a number of Bond girls.

Other, uncredited cast members include Michael Goodliffe as Bill Tanner, MI6's Chief of Staff; Sonny Caldinez as Kra, Scaramanga's security chief; Joie Vejjajiva and Yuen Qiu as Hip's nieces Cha and Nara, and Thohsaphol Sitiwatjana as a martial arts student.

== Production ==
Albert R. Broccoli and Harry Saltzman intended to follow You Only Live Twice with The Man with the Golden Gun, inviting Roger Moore to the Bond role. However, filming was planned in Cambodia, and the Samlaut Uprising combined with Moore's commitments in The Saint, made filming impractical, leading to the production being canceled. On Her Majesty's Secret Service was produced instead with George Lazenby as Bond. Lazenby's next Bond film, Saltzman told a reporter, would be either The Man with the Golden Gun or Diamonds Are Forever. The producers chose the latter title, with Sean Connery returning as Bond after Lazenby's resignation.

United Artists greenlit another James Bond film after viewing dailies of Moore's performance in Live and Let Die. Broccoli and Saltzman then decided to start production on The Man with the Golden Gun after Live and Let Die. This was the final Bond film to be co-produced by Saltzman as his partnership with Broccoli was dissolved after the film's release. Saltzman sold his 50% stake in Eon Productions's parent company, Danjaq, LLC, to United Artists to alleviate his financial problems. The resulting legalities over the Bond property delayed production of the next Bond film, The Spy Who Loved Me, for three years.

The novel is mostly set in Jamaica, a location which had been already used in the earlier films, Dr. No and Live and Let Die; The Man with the Golden Gun saw a change in location to put Bond in either the Far East or the Middle East for the second time. After considering Beirut, where part of the film is set; Israel; Iran, where the location scouting was done but eventually discarded because of the Yom Kippur War; and the Hạ Long Bay in North Vietnam; the production team chose Thailand as a primary location, following a suggestion of production designer Peter Murton after he saw pictures of the Phuket bay in a magazine. Saltzman was happy with the choice of the Far East for the setting as he had always wanted to go on location in Thailand and Hong Kong. During the reconnaissance of locations in Hong Kong, Broccoli saw the wreckage of the former RMS Queen Elizabeth and came up with the idea of using it as the base for MI6's Far East operations.

=== Writing and themes ===
Tom Mankiewicz wrote the first draft for the script in 1973, delivering a script that was a battle of wills between Bond and Scaramanga, who he saw as Bond's alter ego, "a super-villain of the stature of Bond himself". Tensions between Mankiewicz and Guy Hamilton and Mankiewicz's growing sense that he was "feeling really tapped out on Bond" led to the re-introduction of Richard Maibaum as the Bond screenwriter.

Maibaum, who had worked on six Bond films previously, delivered his own draft based on Mankiewicz's work. Much of the plot involving Scaramanga being Bond's equal was sidelined in later drafts. For one of the two main aspects of the plot, the screenwriters used the 1973 energy crisis as a backdrop to the film, allowing the MacGuffin of the "Solex agitator" to be introduced; Broccoli's stepson Michael G. Wilson researched solar power to create the Solex.

While Live and Let Die had borrowed heavily from the blaxploitation genre, The Man with the Golden Gun borrowed from the martial arts genre that was popular in the 1970s through films such as Fist of Fury (1972) and Enter the Dragon (1973). However, the use of the martial arts for a fight scene in the film "lapses into incredibility" when Lt Hip and his two nieces defeat an entire dojo.

=== Casting ===
Originally, the role of Scaramanga was offered to Jack Palance, but he turned the opportunity down. Christopher Lee, who was eventually chosen to portray Scaramanga, was Ian Fleming's step-cousin and Fleming had suggested Lee for the role of Dr. Julius No in the 1962 series opener Dr. No. Lee noted that Fleming was a forgetful man and by the time he mentioned this to Broccoli and Saltzman they had cast Joseph Wiseman in the part. Due to filming on location in Bangkok, his role in the film affected Lee's work the following year, as director Ken Russell was unable to sign Lee to play The Specialist in the 1975 film Tommy, a part eventually given to Jack Nicholson.

Two Swedish models were cast as the Bond girls, Britt Ekland and Maud Adams. Ekland had been interested in playing a Bond girl since she had seen Dr. No, and contacted the producers about the main role of Mary Goodnight. Hamilton met Adams in New York, and cast her because "she was elegant and beautiful that it seemed to me she was the perfect Bond girl". When Ekland read the news that Adams had been cast for The Man with the Golden Gun, she became upset, thinking Adams had been selected to play Goodnight. Broccoli then called Ekland to invite her for the main role, as after seeing her in a film, Broccoli thought Ekland's "generous looks" made her a good contrast to Adams. Hamilton decided to put Marc Lawrence, whom he had worked with on Diamonds Are Forever, to play a gangster shot dead by Scaramanga at the start of the film because he found it an interesting idea to "put sort of a Chicago gangster in the middle of Thailand".

=== Filming ===
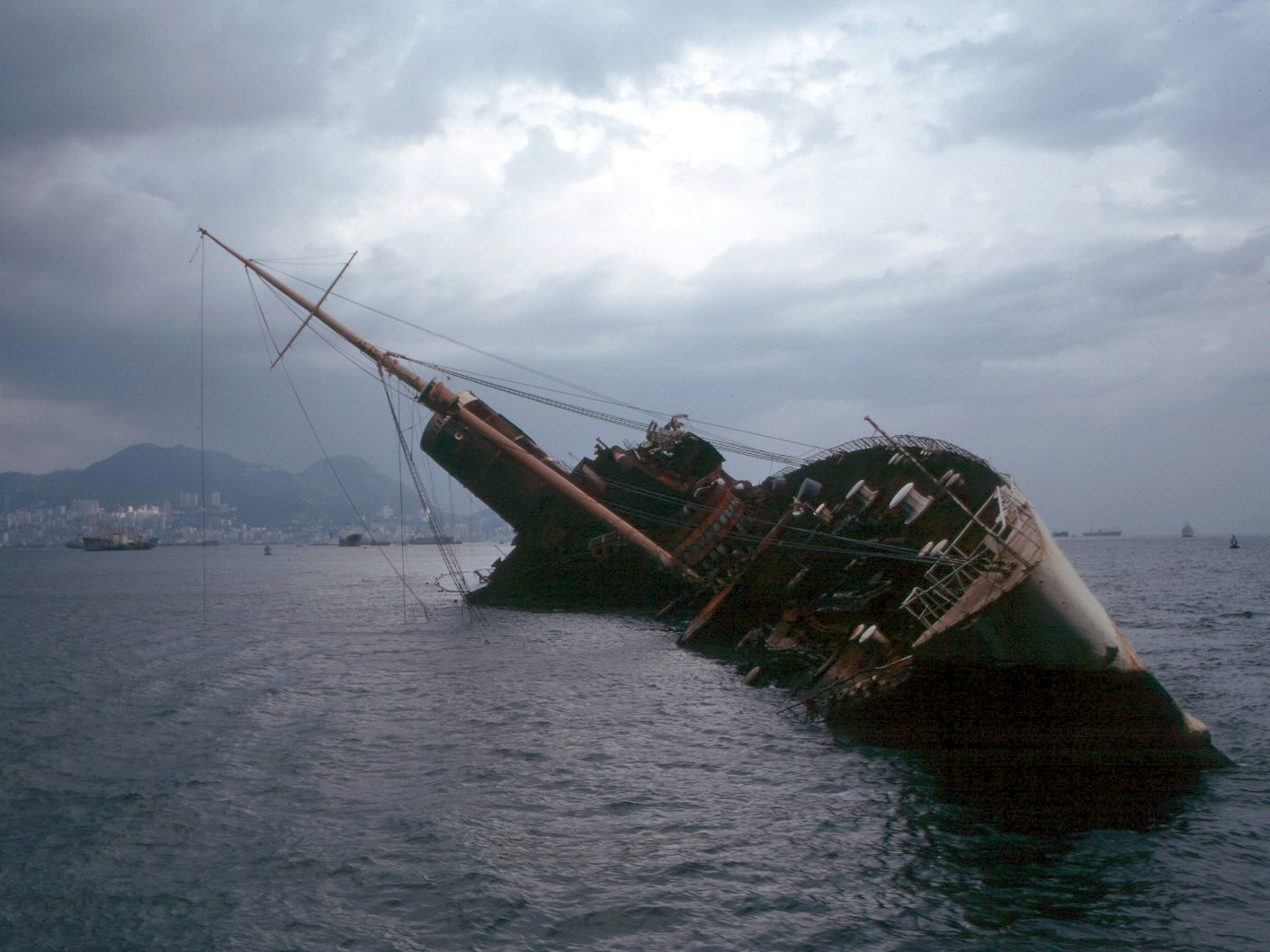
1972: The wreck of the Seawise University, the former RMS Queen Elizabeth, in Victoria Harbour, Hong Kong

Filming commenced on 6 November 1973 at the partly submerged wreck of the RMS Queen Elizabeth, which acted as a top-secret MI6 base grounded in Victoria Harbour in Hong Kong. The crew was small, and a stunt double was used for James Bond. Other Hong Kong locations included the Hong Kong Dragon Garden as the estate of Hai Fat, which portrayed a location in Bangkok. The major part of principal photography started on 18 April 1974 in Thailand. Thai locations included Bangkok, Thonburi, Phuket and nearby Phang Nga Province, on the islands of Ko Khao Phing Kan (Thai: เกาะเขาพิงกัน) and Ko Tapu (Thai: เกาะตะปู). Scaramanga's hideout is on Ko Khao Phing Kan, and Ko Tapu is often now referred to as "James Bond Island" both by locals and in tourist guidebooks. The scene during the boxing match used an actual Muay Thai fixture at Lumpinee Boxing Stadium. The car chase in Bangkok was filmed near the khlong on Krung Kasem Road.

Production returned in late-April to Hong Kong, followed by filming in Macau for its famous casinos, which Hong Kong lacks. Some scenes in Thailand had to be finished, and production had to move to studio work in Pinewood Studios; this included sets such as Scaramanga's solar energy plant and island interior. Academy Award-winning cinematographer Oswald Morris was hired as a replacement for Ted Moore, who fell ill during the shoot. Morris was initially reluctant, as he did not like his previous experiences with taking over other cinematographers' work, but accepted after dining with Broccoli. Production wrapped in Pinewood in August 1974.

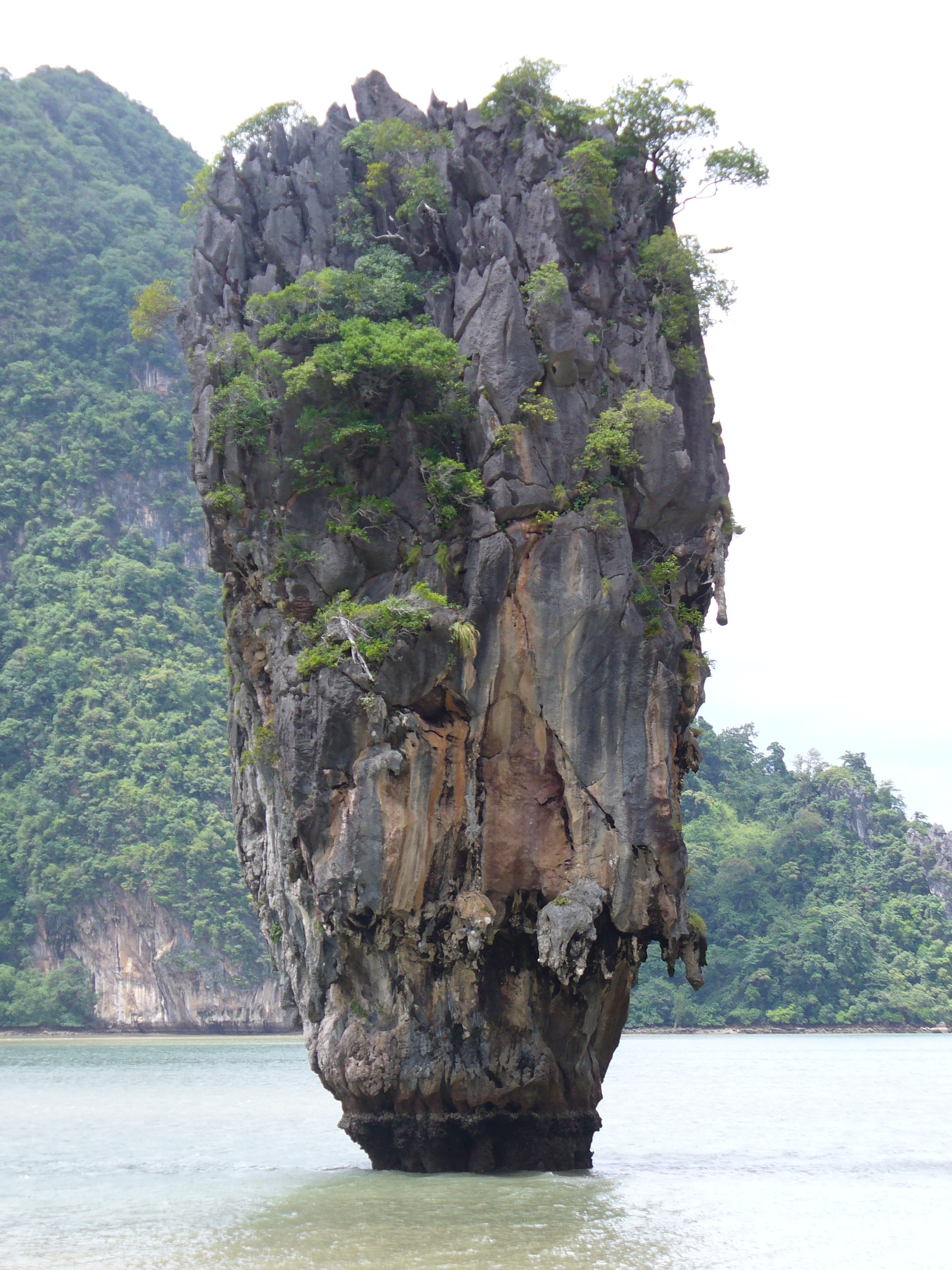
One of Scaramanga's Island's outcrops (high tide)

Bond's duel with Scaramanga, which Mankewicz said was inspired by the climactic faceoff in Shane, was shortened as the producers felt it was causing pacing problems. The trailers featured some of the cut scenes.

Hamilton adapted an idea of his involving Bond in Disneyland for Scaramanga's funhouse. The funhouse was designed to be a place where Scaramanga could get the upper hand by distracting the adversary with obstacles, and was described by Murton as a "melting pot of ideas" which made it "both a funhouse and a horror house". While an actual wax figure of Roger Moore was used, Moore's stunt double Les Crawford was the cowboy figure, and Ray Marione played the Al Capone figure. The canted sets such as the funhouse and the Queen Elizabeth had inspiration from German expressionist films such as The Cabinet of Dr. Caligari. For Scaramanga's solar power plant, Hamilton used both the Pinewood set and a miniature projected by Derek Meddings, often cutting between each other to show there was no discernible difference. The destruction of the facility was a combination of practical effects on the set and destroying the miniature. Meddings based the island blowing up on footage of the Battle of Monte Cassino.

==== Golden Gun prop ====
The Golden Gun

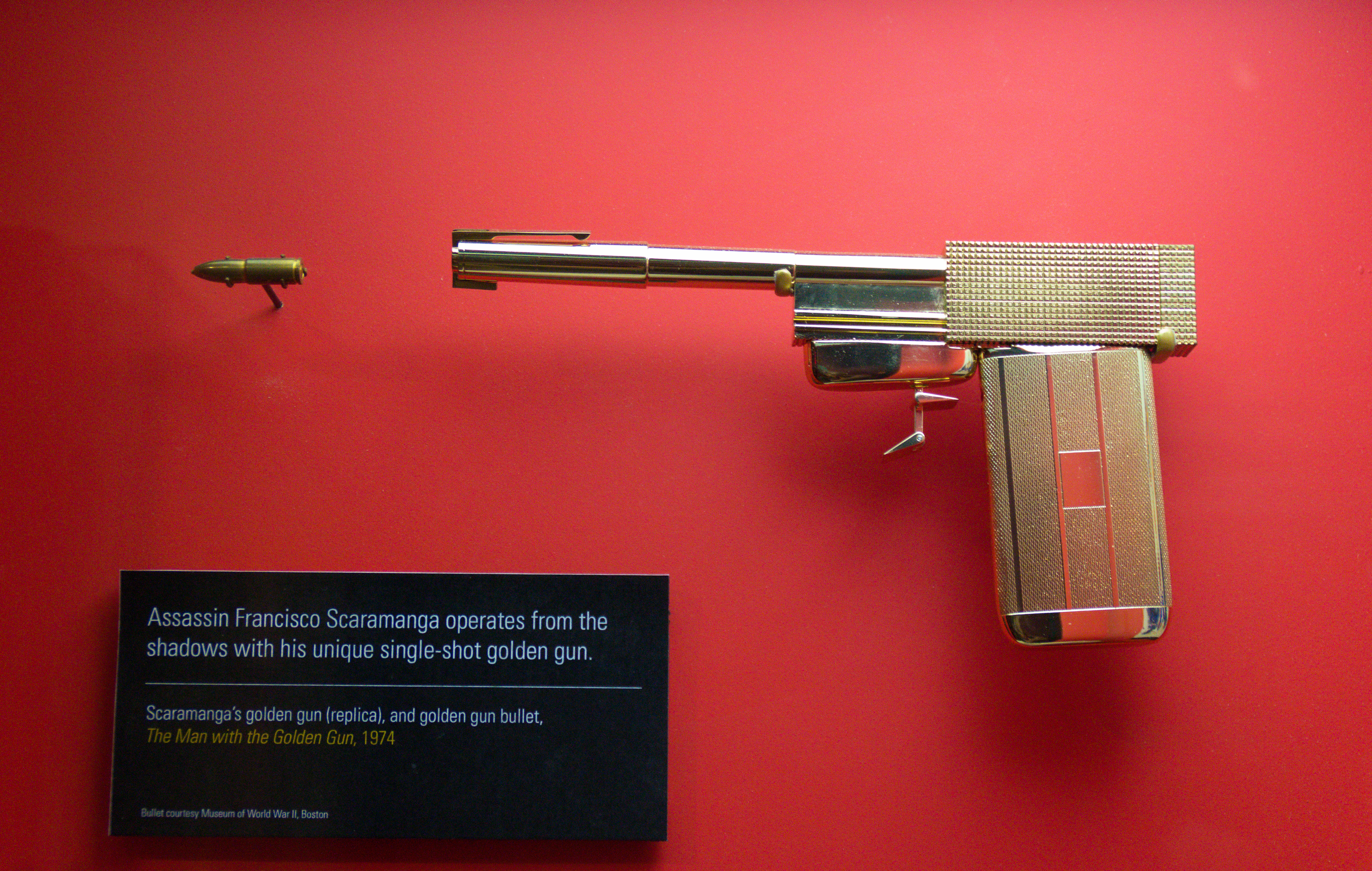
Scaramanga's Golden Gun (2010 Factory entertainment replica)

Three Golden Gun props were made: a solid piece, one that could be fired with a cap, and one that could be assembled and disassembled, although Christopher Lee said that the process "was extremely difficult". The gun was "one of the more memorable props in the Bond series" and consisted of an interlocking fountain pen (the barrel), cigarette lighter (the bullet chamber), cigarette case (the handle) and cufflink (the trigger) with the bullet secured in Scaramanga's belt buckle. In the film, the gun was designed to accept a single 4.2-millimetre, 23-carat gold bullet produced by Lazar, a gunsmith in Macau who specialized in custom weapons and ammunition. The Golden Gun ranked sixth in a 2008 20th Century Fox poll of the most popular film weapons, which surveyed approximately 2,000 film fans.

On 10 October 2008, it was discovered that one of the golden guns used in the film, which is estimated to be worth around £80,000, was missing (suspected stolen) from Elstree Props, a company based at Hertfordshire studios.

==== Car stunts ====
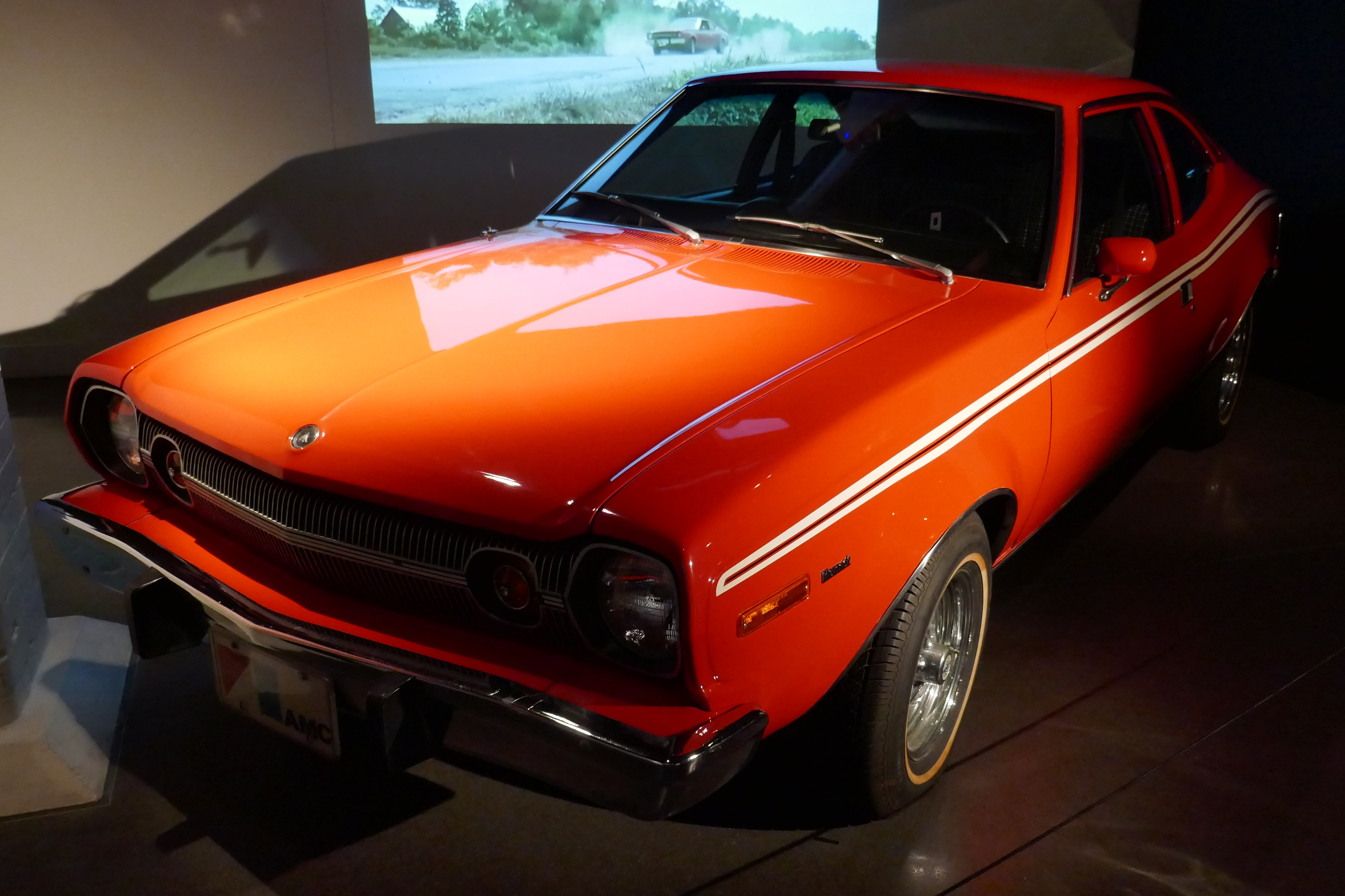
The 1974 AMC Hornet X used for the "astro spiral" jump, on display at the London Film Museum

The film became famous for two vehicle stunts, one which made the Guinness Book of Records.

As part of a significant product placement strategy, a number of vehicles from American Motors Corporation were featured in the movie. The flying car was the newly introduced AMC Matador Brougham Coupe in the Oleg Cassini edition, used by Francisco Scaramanga, along with Nick Nack, to kidnap Mary Goodnight. With the wings, the stunt car was 9.15 m (30 ft) long, 12.80 m (42 ft) wide, and 3.08 m (10 ft) high. A stuntman drove the "car plane" to a runway. It was not airworthy, so a 1 m (39 in)-long remote controlled model, built by John Stears, was used for the aerial sequences. The scene was shot at Bovington Camp.

A 1974 AMC Hornet X was used for the "corkscrew" stunt which was first tested as a computer-simulation (the first of its kind) by Cornell Aeronautical Laboratory. It was then performed as a live-action stunt, successfully filmed in one take.

The stunt was performed by Loren "Bumps" Willert (as James Bond) driving an AMC Hornet leaping a broken bridge and spinning around 360 degrees in mid-air about the longitudinal axis, doing an "aerial twist"; Willert successfully completed the jump on the first take, and was given a $30,000 bonus on the spot. The stunt was shown in slow motion, for the scene was otherwise too fast. Composer John Barry added a slide whistle sound effect over the stunt, which Broccoli kept in despite thinking that it "undercouped the stunt". Barry later regretted his decision, thinking the whistle "broke the golden rule" as the stunt was "for what it was all worth, a truly dangerous moment, ... true James Bond style". The sound effect was described as "simply crass". The writer Jim Smith suggested that the stunt "brings into focus the lack of excitement in the rest of the film and is spoilt by the use of 'comedy' sound effects". Eon Productions had licensed the stunt, which had been designed by Raymond McHenry. It was initially conceived at Cornell Aeronautical Laboratory (CAL) in Buffalo, New York as a test for their vehicle simulation software. After development in simulation, ramps were built and the stunt was tested at CAL's proving ground. It toured as part of the All American Thrill Show as the Astro Spiral before it was picked up for the film. The television programme Top Gear attempted to repeat the stunt in June 2008, but failed.

The corkscrew stunt made the Guinness Book of Records as the first "astro spiral" jump on film.

=== Music ===
The theme tune to The Man with the Golden Gun, released in 1974, was performed by Scottish singer Lulu and composed by John Barry. Tony Bramwell, who worked for Harry Saltzman's music publishing company Hilary Music, wanted Elton John or Cat Stevens to sing the title song. However, by this time, the producers were taking turns producing the films; Albert Broccoli—whose turn it was to produce—rejected Bramwell's suggestions. The lyrics to the Lulu song were written by Don Black and have been described variously as "ludicrous", "inane" and "one long stream of smut", because of their sexual innuendo. Bramwell subsequently dismissed the Barry-Lulu tune as "mundane".

Alice Cooper wrote a song titled "Man with the Golden Gun" to be used by the producers of the film, but they opted for Lulu's song instead. Cooper released his song in his album Muscle of Love.

Barry had only three weeks to score The Man with the Golden Gun and the theme tune and score are generally considered by critics to be among the weakest of Barry's contributions to the series, an opinion shared by Barry himself: "It's the one I hate most ... it just never happened for me." The Man with the Golden Gun was also the first to drop the distinctive plucked guitar from the theme heard over the gun barrel opening. A sample from one of the songs, "Hip's Trip", was used by The Prodigy in the "Mindfields" track on the album The Fat of the Land.

== Release and reception ==
The James Bond 007 pistol, produced by Lone Star Toys

The Man with the Golden Gun opened in the United States and Canada on 18 December 1974. It opened to the public at the Odeon Leicester Square in London on 20 December 1974, following its Royal premiere the night before. Over the holiday period, United Artists had 1,240 prints of the film in release worldwide. The film was made with an estimated budget of $7 million. Despite initial good returns from the box office, including a gross of $3,441,228 in its first 3 to 5 days from 603 theaters in the United States and Canada, The Man with the Golden Gun grossed a total of $97.6 million at the worldwide box office, with $21 million in the US and Canada, making it the fourth lowest-grossing Bond film in the series. Its relatively modest returns by comparison with those of Live and Let Die (1973) reportedly placed the continuation of the franchise in jeopardy.

The promotion of the film had "one of the more anaemic advertising campaigns of the series" and there were few products available, apart from the soundtrack and paperback book, although Lone Star Toys produced a "James Bond 007 pistol" with a gold finish; this differed from the weapon used by Scaramanga in the film as it was little more than a Walther P38 with a silencer fitted.

=== Contemporary reviews ===
The Man with the Golden Gun met with mixed reviews upon its release. Derek Malcolm in The Guardian savaged the film, saying that "the script is the limpest of the lot and ... Roger Moore as 007 is the last man on earth to make it sound better than it is." There was some praise from Malcolm, although it was muted, saying that "Christopher Lee ... makes a goodish villain and Britt Ekland a passable Mary Goodnight ... Up to scratch in production values ... the film is otherwise merely a potboiler. Maybe enough's enough." Tom Milne, writing in The Observer, was even more caustic, writing that "This series, which has been scraping the bottom of the barrel for some time, is now through the bottom ... with depressing borrowings from Hong Kong kung fu movies, not to mention even more depressing echoes of the 'Carry On' smut." He summed up the film by saying it was "sadly lacking in wit or imagination".

David Robinson, the film critic at The Times, dismissed the film and Moore's performance, saying that Moore was "substituting non-acting for Connery's throwaway", while Britt Ekland was "his beautiful, idiot side-kick ... the least appealing of the Bond heroines". Robinson was equally damning of the changes in the production crew, observing that Ken Adam, an "attraction of the early Bond films," had been "replaced by decorators of competence but little of his flair." The writers "get progressively more naive in their creation of a suburban dream of epicureanism and adventure". Writing for The New York Times, Nora Sayre considered the film to suffer from "poverty of invention and excitement", criticising the writing and Moore's performance and finding Villechaize and Lee as the only positive points for their "sinister vitality that cuts through the narrative dough."

The Sunday Mirror critic observed that The Man with the Golden Gun "isn't the best Bond ever" but found it "remarkable that Messrs. Saltzman and Broccoli can still produce such slick and inventive entertainment". Arthur Thirkwell, writing in the Sunday Mirror's sister paper, the Daily Mirror, concentrated more on lead actor Roger Moore than the film itself: "What Sean Connery used to achieve with a touch of sardonic sadism, Roger Moore conveys with roguish schoolboy charm and the odd, dry quip." Thirkwell also said that Moore "manages to make even this reduced-voltage Bond a character with plenty of sparkle". Judith Crist of New York magazine gave a positive review, saying "the scenery's grand, the lines nice and the gadgetry entertaining", also describing the production as a film that "capture[s] the free-wheeling, whooshing non-sense of early Fleming's fairy tale for grown-ups orientation".

Jay Cocks, writing in Time, focused on the gadgets such as Scaramanga's flying car, as what was wrong with both The Man with the Golden Gun and the more recent films in the Bond series, calling them "Overtricky, uninspired, these exercises show the strain of stretching fantasy well past wit." Cocks also criticised the actors, saying that Moore "lacks all Connery's strengths and has several deep deficiencies", while Lee was "an unusually unimpressive villain".

=== Retrospective reviews ===
Opinion on The Man with the Golden Gun has for the most part remained the same as it was in 1974. On Rotten Tomatoes, 40% out of 52 critical reviews about the film were positive, with an average rating of 5.3/10. The website's critical consensus states, "A middling Bond film, The Man With the Golden Gun suffers from double entendre-laden dialogue, a noteworthy lack of gadgets, and a villain that overshadows 007." Metacritic gave the film a weighted average score of 43 out of 100 based on 11 reviews from critics, which indicates "mixed or average reviews".

Some critics saw the film as uninspired, tired and boring. Roger Moore was also criticised for playing Bond against type, in a style more reminiscent of Sean Connery, although Lee's performance received acclaim. Danny Peary wrote that The Man with the Golden Gun "lacks invention ... is one of the least interesting Bond films" and "a very laboured movie, with Bond a stiff bore, Adams and Britt Ekland uninspired leading ladies". Peary believes that the shootout between Bond and Scaramanga in the funhouse "is the one good scene in the movie, and even it has an unsatisfying finish" and also bemoaned the presence of Clifton James, "unfortunately reprising his unfunny redneck sheriff from Live and Let Die."

Chris Nashawaty of Entertainment Weekly argues that Scaramanga is the best villain of the Roger Moore James Bond films, while listing Mary Goodnight among the worst Bond girls, saying that "Ekland may have had one of the series' best bikinis, but her dopey, doltish portrayal was a turnoff as much to filmgoers as to fans of Ian Fleming's novels". The Times put Scaramanga as the fifth best Bond villain in their list, and Ekland was the third in their list of the top 10 most fashionable Bond girls. Maxim listed Goodnight at fourth in their Top Bond Babes list, saying that "Agent Goodnight is the clumsiest spy alive. But who cares as long as she's using her perfect bikini bottom to muck things up?"

== See also ==
- Outline of James Bond
- My Dinner with Hervé, HBO movie which recreates several scenes from The Man with the Golden Gun

== Sources ==
- Barnes, Alan; Hearn, Marcus (2001). Kiss Kiss Bang! Bang!: the Unofficial James Bond Film Companion. Batsford Books. ISBN 978-0-7134-8182-2.
- Benson, Raymond (1988). The James Bond Bedside Companion. London: Boxtree Ltd. ISBN 1-85283-234-7.
- Black, Jeremy (2004). Britain Since the Seventies: Politics and Society in the Consumer Age. Guilford: Biddles Ltd. ISBN 978-1-86189-201-0. Archived from the original on 20 April 2021.
- Black, Jeremy (2005). The Politics of James Bond: from Fleming's Novel to the Big Screen. University of Nebraska Press. ISBN 978-0-8032-6240-9.
- Bramwell, Tony; Kingsland, Rosemary (2006). Magical Mystery Tours: My Life with the Beatles (reprint ed.). Macmillan Publishers. ISBN 978-0-312-33044-6.
- Cork, John; Stutz, Collin (2007). James Bond Encyclopedia. London: Dorling Kindersley. ISBN 978-1-4053-3427-3.
- Fu, Poshek; Desser, David (2000). The Cinema of Hong Kong. Cambridge University Press. ISBN 978-0-521-77235-8.
- Greene, Bob (1974). Billion dollar baby. Athéneum. ISBN 978-0-689-10616-3.
- Mankiewicz, Tom; Crane, Robert (2012). My Life as a Mankiewicz. Lexington, KY: University Press of Kentucky. ISBN 978-0-8131-3605-9.
- Peary, Danny (1986). Guide for the Film Fanatic. Simon & Schuster. ISBN 978-0-671-61081-4.
- Pfeiffer, Lee; Worrall, Dave (1998). The Essential Bond. London: Boxtree Ltd. ISBN 978-0-7522-2477-0.
- Smith, Jim (2002). Bond Films. London: Virgin Books. ISBN 978-0-7535-0709-4.
