= Live and Let Die (film) =

1973 James Bond film by Guy Hamilton

- Theatrical release poster by Robert McGinnis
- Directed by: Guy Hamilton
- Screenplay by: Tom Mankiewicz
- Based on: Live and Let Die; 1954 novel by Ian Fleming
- Produced by: Harry Saltzman; Albert R. Broccoli
- Starring: Roger Moore; Yaphet Kotto; Jane Seymour
- Cinematography: Ted Moore
- Edited by: Bert Bates; Raymond Poulton; John Shirley
- Music by: George Martin
- Production company: Eon Productions Limited
- Distributed by: United Artists
- Release dates: 27 June 1973 (United States); 12 July 1973 (United Kingdom)
- Running time: 121 minutes
- Countries: United Kingdom; United States
- Language: English
- Budget: $7 million
- Box office: $161.8 million

Live and Let Die is a 1973 spy film, the eighth film in the James Bond series produced by Eon Productions, the first to star Roger Moore as the fictional MI6 agent James Bond, and the third in the series directed by Guy Hamilton. It was produced by Harry Saltzman and Albert R. Broccoli, and written by Tom Mankiewicz.

It is based on Ian Fleming's 1954 novel. The storyline involves a drug lord in Harlem, New York City, known as Mr. Big, who plans to distribute two tons of heroin for free to put rival drug lords out of business and then become a monopoly supplier. Mr. Big is revealed to be the alter ego of Dr. Kananga, a corrupt Caribbean dictator who rules San Monique, a fictional island where opium poppies are secretly farmed. Bond is investigating the deaths of three British agents, leading him to Kananga, and he is soon trapped in a world of gangsters and voodoo as he fights to put a stop to Kananga's scheme.

Released during the height of the blaxploitation era in American cinema, Live and Let Die depicts many of the genre's archetypes and clichés, including derogatory racial epithets ("honky"), black gangsters, and pimpmobiles. It departs from the former plots of the Bond films about megalomaniacal supervillains, and instead focuses on drug trafficking, a common theme of blaxploitation films of the period. It is set in African American cultural centres such as Harlem and New Orleans, as well as Caribbean islands. It was also the first Bond film featuring an African American Bond girl romantically involved with 007: Rosie Carver, portrayed by Gloria Hendry.

It was a box-office success and received generally positive reviews from critics. Its title song, written by Paul and Linda McCartney and performed by their band Wings, was also nominated for the Academy Award for Best Original Song.

Live and Let Die was followed by The Man with the Golden Gun the following year in 1974.

== Plot ==
Three MI6 agents are killed under mysterious circumstances within 24 hours—one in the United Nations headquarters in New York City, one in New Orleans, and one in the small Caribbean nation of San Monique, while monitoring the operations of the island's dictator, Dr. Kananga. James Bond, Agent 007, is sent to New York to investigate. Kananga too is in New York—visiting the United Nations. After Bond arrives, his driver is killed by Whisper, one of Kananga's men, whilst driving Bond to visit Felix Leiter of the Central Intelligence Agency (CIA). Bond is nearly killed in the ensuing car crash.

Glastron speedboats in the Louisiana boat chase. The boat chase scene was filmed in the Bayou Des Allemands.

The killer's licence plate leads Bond to Harlem, where he meets Mr. Big, a mob boss who runs a chain of restaurants throughout the United States, but Bond and the CIA do not understand why the most powerful black gangster in New York is working with an unimportant island's leader. Bond meets Solitaire, a tarot reader who has the power of the Obeah and can see both the future and remote events in the present. Mr. Big demands that his henchmen kill Bond, but Bond overpowers them and escapes with the help of CIA agent Strutter. Bond flies to San Monique, where he meets Rosie Carver, a local CIA agent. They meet up with Bond's ally Quarrel Jr., who takes them by boat near Solitaire's home. When Bond suspects Rosie of being a double agent for Kananga, Rosie tries to escape but is killed remotely by Kananga. Bond then uses a stacked deck of tarot cards that show only "The Lovers" to trick Solitaire into thinking that fate is meant for them; Bond then seduces her. Having lost her virginity and thereby her ability to foretell the future, Solitaire realises she will be killed by Kananga, so she agrees to co-operate with Bond. The next day, Bond and Solitaire discover that Kananga has large poppy fields hidden from view.

Bond and Solitaire escape by boat and fly to New Orleans. There, Bond is captured by Mr. Big, who removes a prosthetic face and reveals himself to be Kananga. He has been producing heroin and is protecting the poppy fields by exploiting the San Monique locals' fear of the occult and the voodoo priest Baron Samedi. As Mr. Big, Kananga plans to distribute the heroin free of charge at his restaurants, which will increase the number of addicts. He intends to bankrupt other drug dealers with his giveaway, then charge high prices for his heroin later in order to capitalise on the huge drug dependencies he has cultivated.

Furious at Solitaire for having sex with Bond and losing her ability to read tarot cards, Kananga turns her over to Baron Samedi to be sacrificed. Kananga's henchmen, one-armed Tee Hee and tweed-jacketed Adam, leave Bond to be eaten by crocodilia at his farm in the Deep South backwoods. Bond uses the backs of the reptiles to escape to safety. After setting their drug laboratory on fire, he steals a speedboat and escapes, pursued by Kananga's men under Adam's order, and later Sheriff J.W. Pepper and the Louisiana State Police. Most pursuers get wrecked or left behind, and Adam is killed in a boat crash by Bond.

Bond travels to San Monique and with the help of Quarrel Jr. sets timed explosives throughout the poppy fields. He rescues Solitaire from the voodoo sacrifice just as the explosives destroy the fields, and whilst fighting Samedi, Bond punches him and he falls into a coffin of venomous snakes. Bond and Solitaire escape below ground into Kananga's lair. Kananga captures them both and proceeds to lower them into a shark tank. However, Bond escapes and forces Kananga to swallow a compressed-gas pellet used in shark guns, causing him to inflate and explode.

Leiter puts Bond and Solitaire on a train leaving for New York. Tee Hee sneaks aboard and attempts to kill Bond, but Bond cuts the wires of his prosthetic arm and throws him out of the window. As the film ends, a laughing Samedi is revealed to be riding on the front of the train.

== Cast ==
Promotional image of the main cast of Live and Let Die. From left: Julius Harris, Jane Seymour, Geoffrey Holder, Roger Moore, Yaphet Kotto and Earl Jolly Brown

- Roger Moore as James Bond – 007, a British MI6 agent
- Yaphet Kotto as Dr. Kananga / Mr. Big, a corrupt Caribbean Prime Minister who doubles as a drug lord
- Jane Seymour as Solitaire, Kananga's psychic
- Clifton James as Sheriff J.W. Pepper, a Louisiana sheriff
- Julius W. Harris as Tee Hee Johnson, Kananga's primary henchman, with a pincer-tipped prosthetic arm
- Geoffrey Holder as Baron Samedi, a Kananga henchman with ties to Voodoo occult
- David Hedison as Felix Leiter, Bond's CIA colleague
- Gloria Hendry as Rosie Carver, a junior CIA agent in San Monique
- Bernard Lee as M, the Head of the Secret Intelligence Service
- Lois Maxwell as Miss Moneypenny, M's secretary
- Tommy Lane as Adam, a Kananga henchman
- Earl Jolly Brown as Whisper, a Kananga henchman who only whispers
- Roy Stewart as Quarrel Jr., Bond's ally in San Monique and son of Quarrel from Dr. No
- Lon Satton as Harry Strutter, a CIA agent in New York
- Arnold Williams as Cab Driver 1, a New York taxi driver
- Ruth Kempf as Mrs. Bell, a student pilot
- Joie Chitwood as Charlie, a CIA agent
- Madeline Smith as Miss Caruso ("Beautiful Girl"), an Italian agent
- Michael Ebbin as Dambala, a Kananga henchman in San Monique
- Kubi Chaza as Sales Girl, a cashier in a New York voodoo shop
- B. J. Arnau as a cabaret singer

== Production ==
=== Writing ===
During the filming of Diamonds Are Forever, Live and Let Die was chosen as the next Ian Fleming novel to be adapted because the screenwriter Tom Mankiewicz thought it would be daring to use black villains, for the Black Panthers and other racial movements were active at this time.

Guy Hamilton was again chosen to direct and, given that he was a jazz enthusiast, Mankiewicz suggested he film in New Orleans. Hamilton did not want to use Mardi Gras, for Thunderball (1965) had featured Junkanoo, a similar festivity; so after more discussions with the writer and location scouting with helicopters, he decided to use two well-known features of the city, the jazz funerals and the canals.

To develop a better feel of how Voodoo was practised, Saltzman and Broccoli escorted Hamilton, Mankiewicz, and production designer Syd Cain to scout New Orleans further and then the islands of the West Indies. Haiti was an important destination of the tour: not only had Fleming connected it with the religion, but there were many practitioners available to witness. Despite viewing actual Voodoo demonstrations, it was decided not to film in Haiti because of political unrest in the country at that time. Instead, they chose to film in Jamaica.

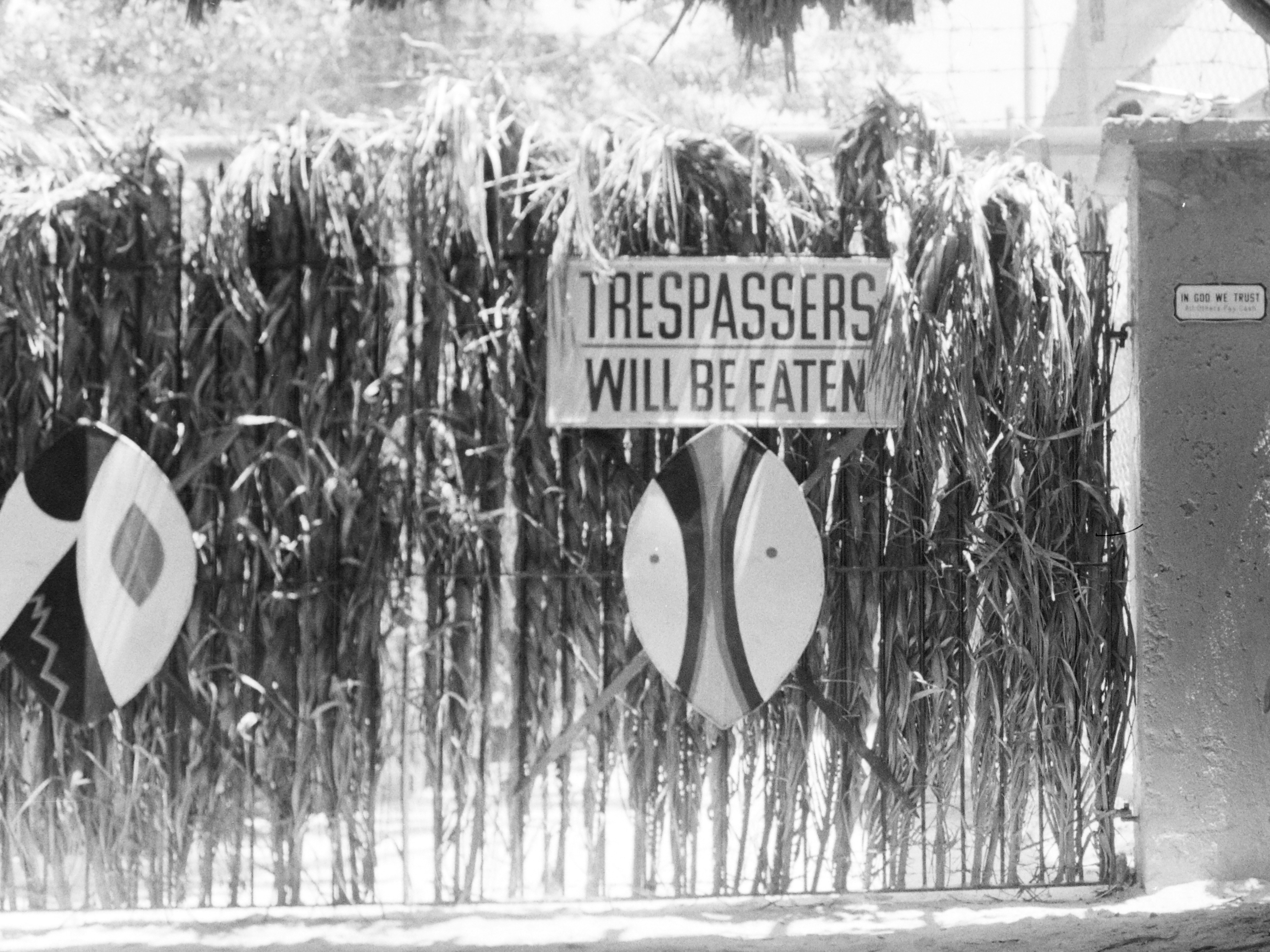
"Trespassers Will Be Eaten" – Gate to Jamaica Safari Village in Falmouth, Jamaica, film location of the crocodile farm/drug lab (photo taken in 1974)

While searching for locations in Jamaica, the crew discovered a crocodile farm in Falmouth, owned by Ross Kananga, after passing a sign warning that "trespassers will be eaten". The crocodile farm was put into the script and also inspired Mankiewicz to name the film's villain after Kananga.

Richard Maibaum later claimed he was asked to write the film but declined because he was too busy. He disliked the completed film, and said that "to process drugs in the middle of the jungle is not a Bond caper."

=== Casting ===
Broccoli and Saltzman tried to convince Sean Connery to return as James Bond, but he declined. At the same time, United Artists considered Steve McQueen and Paul Newman for the role. According to Burt Reynolds, Broccoli subsequently approached him for the role, but Reynolds felt Bond should be played by a British actor and turned the offer down. Among the actors to test for the part of Bond were Julian Glover – who went on to portray Aristotle Kristatos in For Your Eyes Only (1981) – John Gavin, Jeremy Brett, Simon Oates, John Ronane, and William Gaunt. The frontrunner for the role was Michael Billington. Broccoli met Anthony Hopkins to discuss the role, but Hopkins did not think he was right for it. Dick Van Dyke was also approached but declined the role, citing his ability to perform a convincing British accent.

Meanwhile, United Artists was still pushing to cast an American to play Bond, but Broccoli insisted that the part should be played by a British actor and put forward Roger Moore. Moore, who had been considered for the role in Dr. No (1962) and On Her Majesty's Secret Service (1969), was ultimately hired. After Moore was chosen, Billington remained on the top of the list in the event that Moore declined to come back for the next film. Billington played a brief role in the pre-credit sequence of The Spy Who Loved Me (1977). Moore tried not to imitate either Connery's or his own prior performance as Simon Templar in The Saint, and Mankiewicz fitted the screenplay into Moore's persona by giving more comedic scenes and a light-hearted approach to Bond.

Mankiewicz had thought of turning Solitaire into a Black woman, and Diana Ross was his first choice. Broccoli and Saltzman decided to stick to Fleming's description of a white woman and, after considering Catherine Deneuve, cast Jane Seymour, who was in the television series The Onedin Line. After Solitaire was cast with a white actress, the character of Rosie Carver was switched to be a black woman and cast with Gloria Hendry. Yaphet Kotto was cast while doing another film for United Artists, Across 110th Street (1972). Kotto reported one of the things he liked in the role was Kananga's interest in the occult, "feeling like he can control past, present and future".

Mankiewicz created the character Sheriff J. W. Pepper to add comic relief. Clifton James reprised the role in The Man with the Golden Gun the following year. Live and Let Die is also the first of two films featuring David Hedison as Felix Leiter; the actor reprised the role in Licence to Kill (1989). Hedison later said that at the time of Live and Let Die he was sure that it "would be my first—and last" appearance as the character.

Madeline Smith, who played Miss Caruso, sharing Bond's bed in the film's opening, was recommended for the part by Roger Moore after he had appeared with her on television. Smith said that Moore was polite and pleasant to work with, but she felt very uncomfortable being clad in only blue bikini panties while Moore's wife was on set overseeing the scene.

Live and Let Die was the only Bond film until Casino Royale (2006) not to feature the character Q, portrayed by Desmond Llewelyn. He was then appearing in the television series Follyfoot, but was written out of three episodes so that he could appear in the film. By then Saltzman and Broccoli had decided not to include the character, feeling that "too much was being made of the films' gadgets" and deciding to downplay this aspect of the series; this caused Llewelyn much annoyance.

Bernard Lee considered not reprising his role as M due to the death of his wife Gladys Merredew, and was nearly recast with Kenneth More. However, he ultimately returned to the role.

Lois Maxwell had only been included in Diamonds Are Forever (1971) during filming as a late addition, as she had asked for a pay increase. For Live and Let Die, she returned for the same fee, but due to a technical error, the filming of her scenes in Bond's home at the start extended to two days, costing the production more than if they had paid the increase she requested. Moore later wrote that Maxwell celebrated the double-payday by purchasing a fur coat.

=== Filming ===
Principal photography began on 13 October 1972 in New Orleans, Louisiana. For a while, after Moore was diagnosed with kidney stones, only the second unit was shooting. Hamilton initially wanted to film in Haiti, which the fictional San Monique was modelled after, but could not because of the political instability under the regime of François "Papa Doc" Duvalier. In November, the production moved to Jamaica, which represented San Monique. In December, production was divided between interiors in Pinewood Studios in Iver Heath and location shooting in Harlem in New York City. The producers were reportedly required to pay protection money to a local Harlem gang to ensure the crew's safety. When the money ran out, they were forced to leave. Some exteriors were in fact shot on the Upper East Side of Manhattan as a result of the difficulties of using real Harlem locations. The street chase was shot at FDR Drive. Ross Kananga suggested the stunt of Bond jumping on crocodiles, and was enlisted by the producers to perform it. The scene took five attempts to complete. In one attempt, the last crocodile caught Kananga's heel and tore his trousers.

The production had trouble with snakes during the voodoo ceremony scene in Jamaica. The script supervisor was so afraid that she refused to be on set with them; an actor fainted while filming a scene where he is killed by a snake; Jane Seymour became terrified as a snake was held up to her face; and Geoffrey Holder only agreed to fall into the snake-filled casket because Princess Alexandra was visiting the set. Despite being told by the prop supervisor that the snakes had all been defanged, Holder told Moore that it did not feel like they had. During filming, Seymour was tied up to a stake while a dancer was to approach her with a snake. The snake bit him and he dropped it, drawing everyone's attention to him. Meanwhile the snake headed for Seymour, who was saved by the film's snake handler grabbing it when it was inches from Seymour's feet.

The boat chase was filmed in Louisiana around the Irish Bayou area, with some interruption caused by flooding. 26 boats were built by the Glastron boat company for the film. 17 were destroyed during rehearsals. The speedboat jump scene over the bayou – filmed with the assistance of a specially-constructed ramp – unintentionally set a Guinness World Record at the time with 110 feet (34 m) cleared. The waves created by the impact caused the following boat to flip over.

The escape in a double-decker bus was filmed using a modified former London bus that had had its top deck removed and remounted on rollers so it would slide off on impact with the low bridge. The top deck was bolted in position for all other filming. The stunts involving the bus were performed by Maurice Patchett, a London Transport bus driving instructor.

Salvador Dalí was approached in 1973 to design a Surrealist tarot deck for the film. However, his fee was too high for the film budget. At the end, the deck used in the film was designed by Fergus Hall. Dalí kept working at his design of the deck, and released it in 1984.

=== Music ===
Harold Dejan's Olympia Brass Band

John Barry, who had worked on the previous seven films, was unavailable during production as he was working on the stage musical Billy. Broccoli and Saltzman instead asked Paul McCartney to write the theme song. Saltzman, mindful of his decision not to produce A Hard Day's Night (1964), was especially eager to work with McCartney. Most of their $25,000 music budget went to McCartney's fee. The remainder was not enough to hire a composer of Barry's stature. They settled on George Martin, who had been the Beatles' producer, to score the film.

"Live and Let Die", written by McCartney along with his wife Linda and performed by their group Wings, was the first true rock and roll song used to open a Bond film, and became a major success in the UK (where it reached number nine in the charts) and the US (where it reached number two, for three weeks). It was nominated for an Academy Award, but lost to "The Way We Were". Saltzman and Broccoli hired B. J. Arnau to record and perform the title song, not realising that McCartney intended to perform it. Arnau's version was featured in the film, when the singer performs it in a night club that Bond visits.

In the pre-titles sequence, the Olympia Brass Band is seen performing "Just a Closer Walk with Thee" as a funeral march, then the more lively "New Second Line" (also known as "Joe Avery's Piece"), created by Milton Batiste.

== Release and reception ==
The film was released in the United States on 27 June 1973. The world premiere was at Odeon Leicester Square in London on 6 July 1973, with general release in the United Kingdom on the same day. From a budget of around $7 million ($51 million in 2025 dollars), the film grossed $161.8 million ($1,173 million in 2025 dollars) worldwide.

It holds the record for the most-viewed broadcast film on television in the United Kingdom by attracting 23.5 million viewers when premiered on ITV on 20 January 1980.

=== Contemporary reviews ===
Roger Ebert of the Chicago Sun-Times stated that Moore "has the superficial attributes for the job: The urbanity, the quizzically raised eyebrow, the calm under fire and in bed". However, he felt that Moore was not satisfactory in living up to the legacy left by Sean Connery in the preceding films. He rated the villains "a little banal", adding that the film "doesn't have a Bond villain worthy of the Goldfingers, Dr. Nos and Oddjobs of the past." Richard Schickel, reviewing for Time magazine, described the film as "the most vulgar addition to a series that has long since outlived its brief historical moment — if not, alas, its profitability." He also criticised the action sequences as excessive, but noted that "aside an allright speedboat spectacular over land and water, the film is both perfunctory and predictable—leaving the mind free to wander into the question of its overall taste. Or lack of it."

Roger Greenspun of The New York Times praised Moore as "a handsome, suave, somewhat phlegmatic James Bond—with a tendency to throw away his throwaway quips as the minor embarrassments that, alas, they usually are." He was critical of Jane Seymour and Yaphet Kotto, the latter of whom he felt "does not project evil." In summary, he remarked the film was "especially well photographed and edited, and it makes clever and extensive use of its good title song, by Paul and Linda McCartney." Charles Champlin of the Los Angeles Times likened Moore as "a handsome and smoothly likable successor to Sean Connery as James Bond." He further noted that the script "uses only the bare bones of Fleming's story about evil doings which link Harlem with a mysterious Caribbean island. The level of invention is high, but now and again you do sense the strain of always having to try harder because you're No. 1. If one menacing viper is good, three or a coffinful full are not inevitably better. But the action never slumps, and the series never seemed more like a real cartoon."

Arthur D. Murphy of Variety wrote that Moore was "an okay replacement for Sean Connery. The Tom Mankiewicz script, faced with a real-world crisis in the villain sector, reveals that plot lines have descended further to the level of the old Saturday afternoon serial, and the treatment is more than ever like a cartoon. Unchanged are the always-dubious moral values and the action set pieces. Guy Hamilton's direction is good."

=== Retrospective reviews ===
Chris Nashawaty, reviewing for the BBC, argues that Dr. Kananga/Mr. Big is the worst villain of the Moore Bond films. Also from the BBC, William Mager praised the use of locations, but said that the plot was "convoluted". He stated that "Connery and Lazenby had an air of concealed thuggishness, clenched fists at the ready, but in Moore's case a sardonic quip and a raised eyebrow are his deadliest weapons".

Danny Peary, in his book Guide for the Film Fanatic, noted that Seymour portrays "one of the Bond series' most beautiful heroines", but had little praise for Moore, whom he described as making "an unimpressive debut as James Bond in Tom Mankiewicz's unimaginative adaptation of Ian Fleming's second novel ... The movie stumbles along most of the way. It's hard to remember Moore is playing Bond at times — in fact, if he and Seymour were black, the picture could pass as one of the black exploitation films of the day. There are few interesting action sequences — a motorboat chase is trite enough to begin with, but the filmmakers make it worse by throwing in some stupid Louisiana cops, including pot-bellied Sheriff Pepper."

Ian Nathan of Empire wrote "This is good quality Bond, managing to reinterpret the classic moves — action, deduction, seduction — for a more modern idiom without breaking the mould. On one side we get the use of alligators as stepping stones and the pompous pitbull of rootin' tootin' Sheriff Pepper caught up in the thrilling boat chase. On the other, the genuine aura of threat through weird voodoo henchman Tee Hee and the leaning toward — what's this? — realism in Mr Big's plot to take over the drug trade from the Mafia." He concluded that "Moore had got his feet under the table."

In November 2006 Entertainment Weekly listed Live and Let Die as the third-best Bond film. MSN chose it as the thirteenth-best Bond film and IGN listed it as the twelfth-best. IGN ranked Solitaire as the 10th in a Top 10 Bond Babes list.

On the review aggregator website Rotten Tomatoes, the film has an approval rating of 67% from 54 reviews, with an average rating of 5.7/10. The website's critical consensus reads: "While not one of the highest-rated Bond films, Live and Let Die finds Roger Moore adding his stamp to the series with flashes of style and an improved sense of humor." On Metacritic, the film has a score of 55 based on 9 reviews, indicating "mixed or average reviews".

=== Accolades ===
Award	Category	Recipients	Result
Academy Awards	Best Original Song	"Live and Let Die"; Music and Lyrics by Paul McCartney and Linda McCartney	Nominated
Evening Standard British Film Awards	Best Film	Guy Hamilton	Won
Grammy Awards	Album of Best Original Score Written for a Motion Picture or a Television Special	Live and Let Die – Paul McCartney, Linda McCartney and George Martin	Nominated
Satellite Awards	Best Classic DVD Release	The James Bond DVD Collection (Volumes: 2 and 3)	Nominated
Saturn Awards	Best DVD Collection	James Bond Ultimate Edition	Won

In 2004 the American Film Institute nominated the title song for AFI's 100 Years...100 Songs.

== See also ==
- List of American films of 1973
- List of drug films
- Outline of James Bond

== Bibliography ==
- Burlingame, Jon (2014). The Music of James Bond. Oxford University Press. ISBN 978-0-199-35885-4.
- Field, Matthew; Chowdhury, Ajay (2015). Some Kind of Hero: The Remarkable Story of the James Bond Films. The History Press. ISBN 978-0-7509-6421-0. OCLC 930556527.
