= Lockhart Road =

Street in Wan Chai, Hong Kong

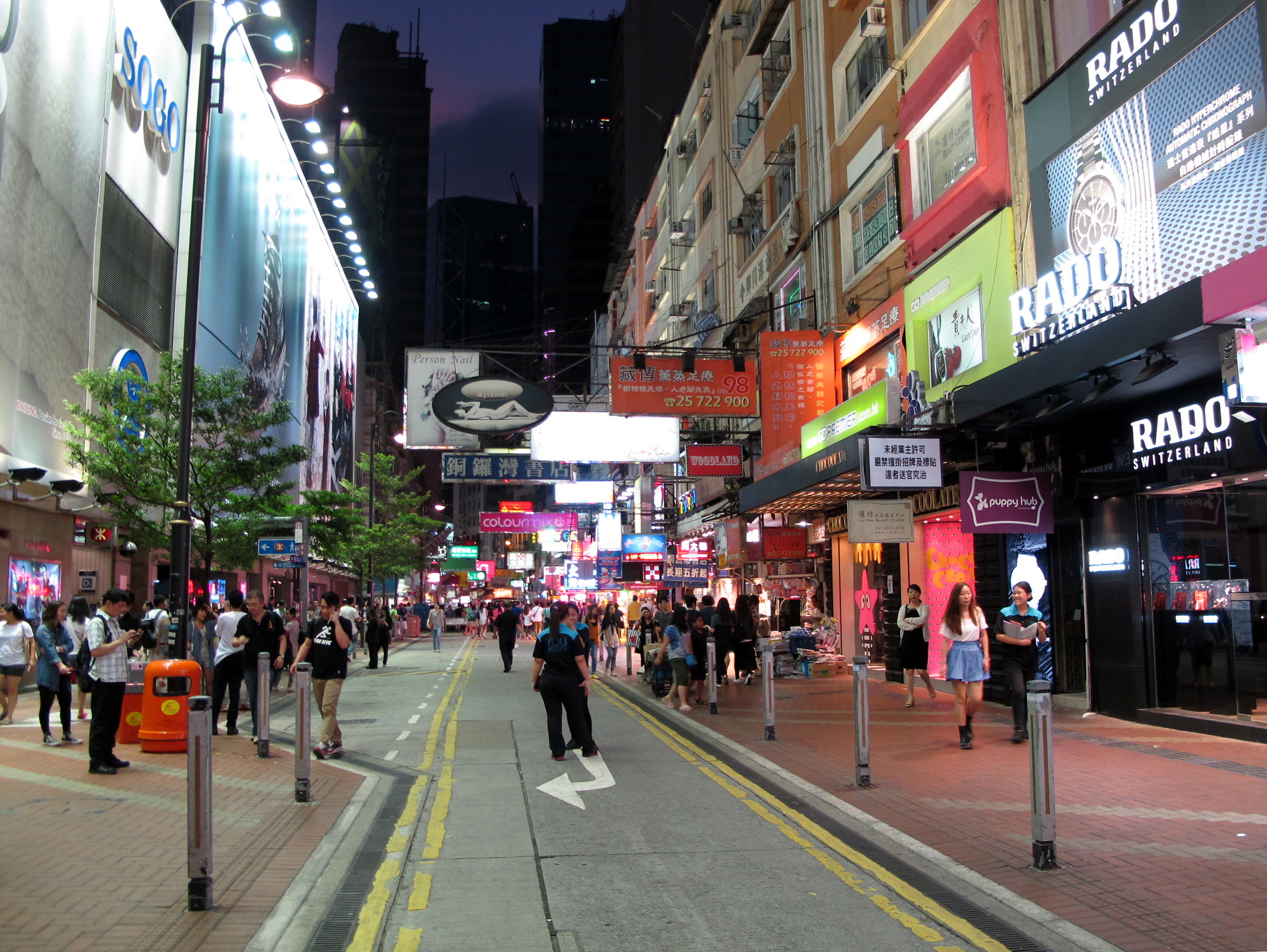
- The eastern tip of Lockhart Road, with the Sogo department store on the left
- Interactive map of Lockhart Road
- Native name: 駱克道 (Yue Chinese)
- Namesake: Sir James Stewart Lockhart
- Length: 1.7 km (1.1 mi)
- Location: Hong Kong
- Coordinates: 22.27818°N 114.17340°E

Lockhart Road
- Traditional Chinese: 駱克道
- Simplified Chinese: 骆克道
Transcriptions
Standard Mandarin
- Hanyu Pinyin: Luòkè Dào
Yue: Cantonese
- Jyutping: lok3 hak1 dou6

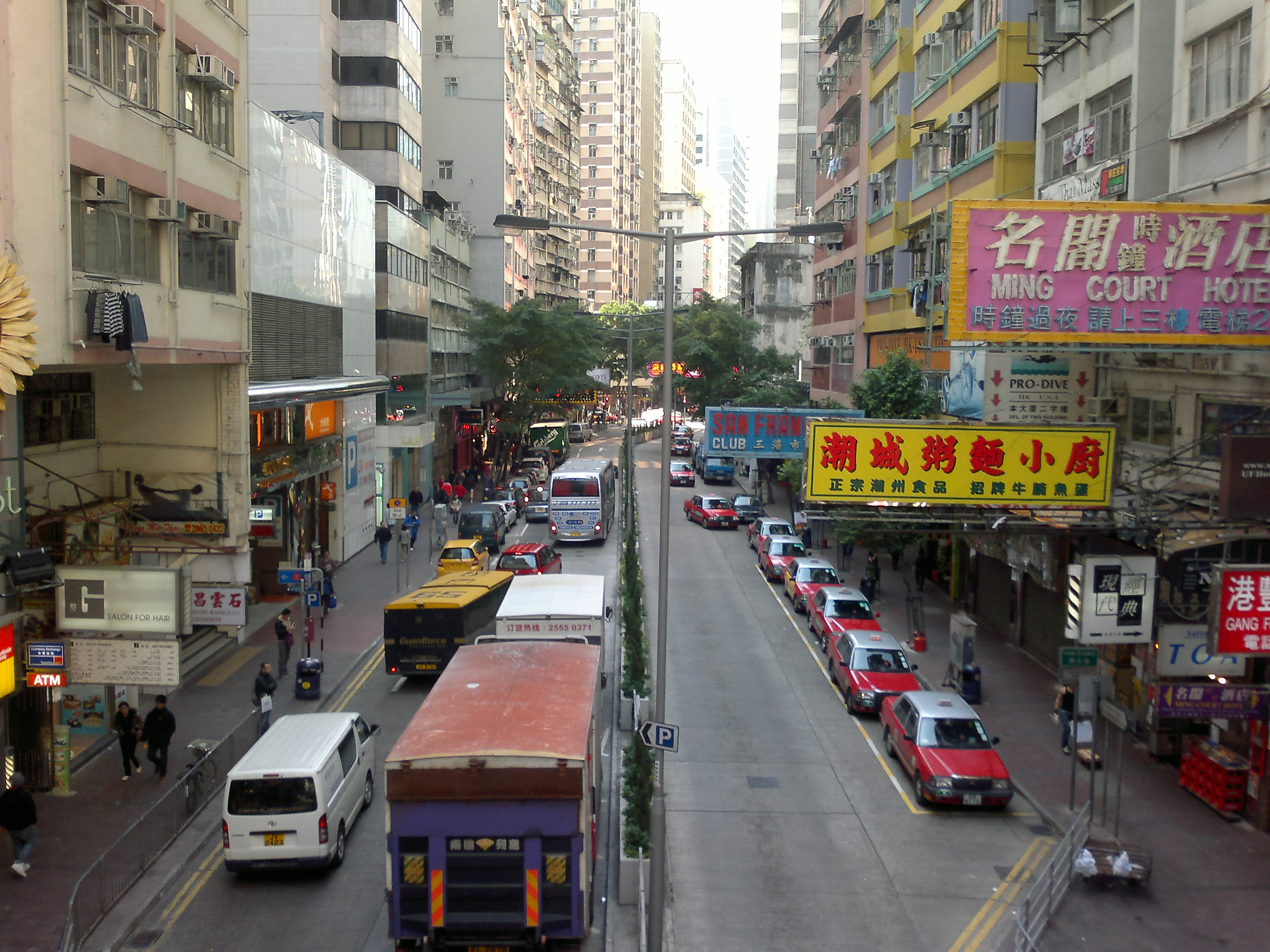
Western part of Lockhart Road viewed from O'Brien Road Footbridge.

Lockhart Road (Chinese: 駱克道) is a street spanning the whole length of Wan Chai from east to west on Hong Kong Island. It begins as a four-lane road at the junction with Arsenal Street in the west, and ends as a one-way street (after passing the junction with Percival Street) at the northern tip of East Point Road in East Point.

== History ==
The road is named after Sir James Stewart Lockhart, Colonial Secretary of Hong Kong from 1895 to 1902, who signed the Convention for the Extension of Hong Kong Territory.

On 17 December 2005, during the WTO Conference, protestors from South Korea broke the police cordon on Lockhart Road in an attempt to storm the Hong Kong Convention and Exhibition Centre in Wan Chai North, resulting in a major clash with the Hong Kong Police Force.

== Bar district ==
Part of Lockhart Road near its western end is the backbone of one of Hong Kong Island's two main bar districts – the other being the slightly more upmarket Lan Kwai Fong and SoHo area. Once considered primarily a red light district, the area has since evolved into a more diverse entertainment district with bars, pubs, restaurants, and discos. A number of the raunchier bars still remain, with scantily clad girls from Thailand and the Philippines attracting punters from the doorways. This is the area in which the novel and film The World of Suzie Wong was set.

== See also ==
- Bottoms Up Club
- List of streets and roads in Hong Kong
