= B. J. Arnau =

Actress and Singer (1941–1989)

- Arnau in February 1976.
- Born: Brenda Burton; June 1941; Cleveland, Ohio, U.S.
- Died: November 1989 (aged 48); London, England
- Other name: Brenda Arnau
- Years active: 1968–1982
- Employer(s): United Artists Records, RCA Records
- Known for: Singer and actress, designer (clothing)
- Height: 5 ft 10 in (178 cm)
- Spouses: Michael Arnaud (deceased); Michael Bastow (divorced)
- Children: 1

Brenda Arnaud (born Brenda Burton; June 1941 – November 1989), known as B. J. Arnau, was an American-born female singer and actress active in the UK and the US from the late 1960s to the early 1980s.

== Biography ==
Very little is known about the artist apart from an August 1973 newspaper article.

She was born in Cleveland, Ohio, United States, in June 1941, and she had a younger brother who predeceased her. Her first husband's surname was Arnaud, which she modified to "Arnau" for her stage name. As of the date of the article, she was married to Michael Bastow (a movie art-director) and had one daughter whom she kept out of the limelight.

After considering a career as a fashion designer, Brenda worked as a telephone operator in Los Angeles, then as a go-go dancer and a hairdresser in San Francisco, before moving to Las Vegas to audition as a "showgirl." She eventually managed to land a guest-spot on Joey Bishop's TV show, and a role as a sharecropper in the movie of Finian's Rainbow (1968), but success in the U.S. eluded her, so she decided to try somewhere else.

Surprisingly, she began in the Far East, becoming quite a star on the U.S. Armed Forces Network during the Vietnam War, and performing for American troops in the war zone. Enduring this gave her the courage to travel and spread her wings abroad. She moved to Paris where she began to build a successful career there and her fame spread to London. Her growing popularity began to make its way back to the U.S. via Live and Let Die and The Benny Hill Show.

While singing at London's Playboy Club in 1970, she was discovered by producer Kenneth Tynan, who added her to the cast of his successful West End production of Oh Calcutta, and gave her new material in it, including a scene entitled "To His American Mistress". She stayed with the production for seven months. She took singing lessons which only enhanced her vocal talent and allowed her to make tracks for top British record producer Jonathan King, who released her singles: "I Want To Go Back There Again" and "The Big Hurt". Both received critical acclaim and cult following, but neither became hits. So she left the UK on a world tour of cabaret performances.

In 1973, she returned to England, where she starred in and developed the role of Silvia, in the original London production of the rock musical Two Gentlemen of Verona, and sang on the cast recording of it.

Then followed the performance for which Arnau is best remembered; as the cabaret act in the James Bond film Live and Let Die (1973). She performed the title track (composed by Paul and Linda McCartney). The producer, Harry Saltzman, requested a talented and versatile soul singer for the opening credits but Arnau's appearance was a surprise. The soundtrack's composer and producer George Martin indicated that “McCartney would only allow the song to be used in the movie if [his group] Wings were able to perform the song in the opening credits...” But in a review of the soundtrack, Eder cites Arnau's performance as “far more interesting [than] any of the instrumental material...”.

Another female singer, Shirley Bassey, was already synonymous with Bond themes: Arnau went on to perform Bassey's hit "Big Spender" on the 1975 Morecambe and Wise Christmas Show (following Bassey's 1971 appearance).

Live and Let Die strengthened a demand on TV; acting and singing on The Benny Hill Show (Episode 27 - aired 24 March 1976), and in guest spots on The John Denver Show and Frost’s Weekly.

Arnau's James Bond appearance led to her then signing a three-year record deal with RCA in London, and securing a cabaret season at Caesars Palace in Las Vegas. An LP of cover-versions was released the same year. It was a serious effort drawing on her soul roots, backed by a variety of artists including Francis Moneyman of Sky and Curved Air; Albert Lee of Heads Hands & Feet; Herbie Flowers (also of Sky), Doris Troy and Rosetta Hightower. Her single recordings for various labels dating from 1968 culminated with the release of the self-penned double-A side "Electra Flash" / "Dance Electra Flash"' on Pye in 1980. "Electra Flash"'s disco influence was a departure from earlier material on United Artists Records and Polydor.

Arnau died in November 1989, at the age of 48, of a brain tumour.

== Filmography ==
- Finian's Rainbow (1968) – Sharecropper 'Necessity' (uncredited)
- Live and Let Die (1973) – Singer

== Discography ==
=== Singles ===
- 1968 "Gonna Spread Love" (UA)
- 1969 "Yesterday I Heard the Rain" (UA)
- 1971 "Children Outside" (Philips)
- 1971 "I Wanna Go Back There Again" (Mojo/Polydor) Produced by Jonathan King
- 1972 "The Big Hurt" (Polydor) Produced by Jonathan King
- 1973 "Baby Don’t Get Hooked On Me" (RCA)
- 1973 "Live and Let Die" (RCA)
- 1973 "Jubilation" (RCA)
- 1974 "Step in the Right Direction" (Bell)
- 1980 "Electra Flash" / "Dance Electra Flash" (Pye)
- 1982 "Stay" (Forever Records, Italy)

=== Albums ===
- 1968 Finian's Rainbow Soundtrack [Uncredited] (Warner Brothers)
- 1973 Two Gentlemen of Verona - Original London Cast Recording (RSO)
- 1973 Live and Let Die Soundtrack (UA)
- 1973 B. J. Arnau (RCA)
