= Bernard Lee =

English actor (1908–1981)

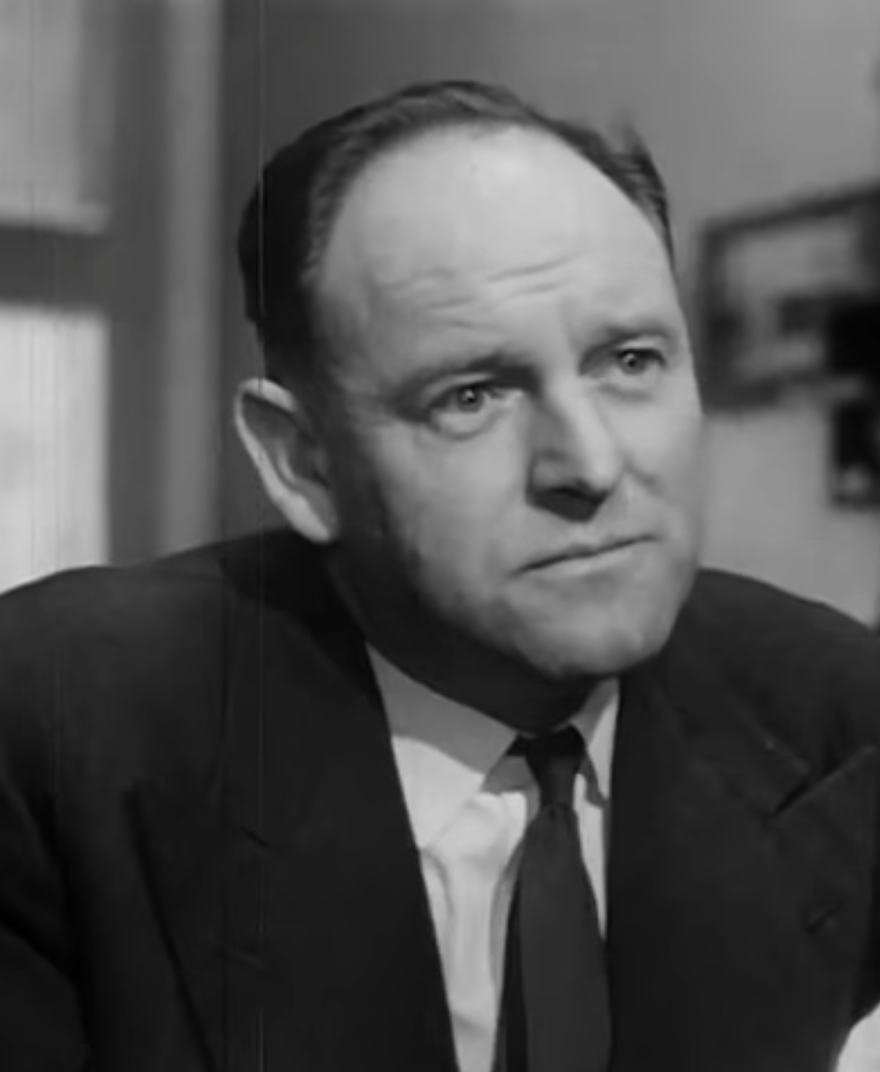
- Lee in Beat the Devil (1953)
- Born: John Bernard Lee; 10 January 1908; Brentford, Middlesex, England
- Died: 16 January 1981 (aged 73); London, England
- Education: Royal Academy of Dramatic Art
- Occupation: Actor
- Years active: 1924−1981
- Spouses: Gladys Merredew (m. 1934; died 1972) Ursula McHale (m. 1975)
- Children: 1
- Family: Jonny Lee Miller (grandson)
- Military career
- Allegiance: United Kingdom
- Branch: British Army
- Rank: 2nd lieutenant
- Unit: Royal Sussex Regiment
- Conflicts: World War II

John Bernard Lee (10 January 1908 – 16 January 1981) was an English actor, best known for his role as M in the first 11 Eon-produced James Bond films. His film career spanned the years 1934 to 1979, though he had appeared on stage from the age of six.

Lee appeared in over 100 films, as well as on stage and in television dramatisations. He was known for his roles as authority figures, often playing military characters or policemen in films such as The Third Man, The Blue Lamp, The Battle of the River Plate, and Whistle Down the Wind.

== Early life and education ==
Lee was born on 10 January 1908, the son of Nellie (née Smith) and Edmund James Lee. He was born in either County Cork in what is now the Republic of Ireland, or Brentford, Middlesex. (Note: Two reliable and independent sources (the British Film Institute (BFI) and the 1981 reference work Who's Who in the Theatre, Volume 1) have differing locations for Lee's place of birth, with Parker showing London and the BFI listing Cork, stating "Some sources give London as birthplace". The 1938, 1942 and 1943 editions of the International Motion Picture Almanac also claim he was born in County Cork.) Edmund, an actor, introduced his six-year-old son to the stage in 1914 in a sketch called "The Double Event" at the Oxford Music Hall in London. Lee attended the Royal Academy of Dramatic Art, and worked as a fruit porter to pay his fees.

=== Military service ===
Lee served with the British Army during the Second World War. He was commissioned as a second lieutenant in Royal Sussex Regiment on 13 September 1941. While waiting to be demobbed he attended a golfing ladies' night where he met a producer. This subsequently led to his being offered a part in the play Stage Door.

== Career ==
=== Early roles ===
After graduating from RADA in the 1930s, Lee began working in repertory theatre in Cardiff and in Rusholme, Manchester, before beginning work on the West End stage in thrillers, such as Blind Man's Bluff. He also played comedic roles, such as in the play Ten Minute Alibi with Arthur Askey.

Lee's screen debut was in The Double Event (1934), followed by a role as Cartwright in Berthold Viertel's Rhodes of Africa (1936), a biopic of Cecil Rhodes, in which he starred alongside Walter Huston, Oscar Homolka, and Basil Sydney. Although Lee was in wartime service in the army between 1940 and 1946, he had managed to act in several films earlier which were released between 1939 and 1943, including Murder in Soho, The Frozen Limits, and Let George Do It! (known in the US as To Hell with Hitler, 1940) with George Formby.

=== Post-war ===
In the late 1940s, Lee returned to the stage whilst also developing a successful film career. He had appeared in Murder in Soho (1939) then in Herbert Wilcox's The Courtneys of Curzon Street (1947), playing a colonel alongside Anna Neagle, Michael Wilding and Daphne Slater; the film was a major success and became the biggest hit at the British box office of 1947. He developed a reputation for playing "solid, dependable characters such as policemen, serving officers or officials" in films such as The Fallen Idol (1948), The Third Man (1949), The Blue Lamp (1950), Last Holiday (1950), Cage of Gold (1950), Mr. Denning Drives North (1952), White Corridors (1951), The Yellow Balloon (1953), Beat the Devil (1953), and Father Brown (1954), and commanders, colonels, or brigadiers in films such as Morning Departure (1950), Calling Bulldog Drummond (1951), Appointment with Venus (1951), and many more. In John Huston's Beat the Devil (1953), Terence Pettigrew considers Lee to have been instrumental to the climax of the film, remarking that it was "left to Bernard Lee to inject a badly needed touch of earthiness at the end." In total, Lee appeared in over one hundred films during his career.

During the 1950s, Lee had a long run on stage, appearing as Able Seaman Turner in Seagulls Over Sorrento, a role he later reprised in the film of the same name with Gene Kelly (released in the US as Crest of the Wave). Lee starred opposite Gregory Peck in The Purple Plain (1954), playing a Royal Air Force medical officer based in Burma during the late Second World War and portrayed Captain Patrick Dove in Michael Powell and Emeric Pressburger's war film The Battle of the River Plate (1956), based upon the battle of the same name. He starred alongside John Gregson, Anthony Quayle and Peter Finch. George Lovell remarked that Captain Patrick Dove was played "ponderously by Bernard Lee, but he forms a much closer bond with the battleship's commander, Captain Langsdorff (Peter Finch)." The film was the fourth most popular film in Britain in 1957. Other films of this period include The Spanish Gardener (1956), Dunkirk (1958), Beyond This Place (1959), Whistle Down the Wind (1961), and The L-Shaped Room (1962).

=== James Bond series ===
Lee as M in The Man with the Golden Gun (1974)

In 1962 Lee was cast in the role that The Illustrated Who's Who of the Cinema described as his best remembered, playing the character of M, the head of the Secret Intelligence Service (MI6)—and the superior of James Bond—in the first Eon Productions film, Dr. No. A number of writers have noted that Lee's interpretation of the character was in line with the original literary representation; Cork and Stutz observed that Lee was "very close to Fleming's version of the character", whilst Rubin commented on the serious, efficient, no-nonsense authority figure. Smith and Lavington, meanwhile, remarked that Lee was "the very incarnation of Fleming's crusty admiral." One American newspaper, The Spokesman-Review, described Lee as "a real roast-beef-and-Yorkshire-pudding type of British actor". Murray Pomerance refers to Lee as a "paternal actor" in embodying this role.

Terence Pettigrew, in his study British film character actors: great names and memorable moments agreed, noting that Lee was a "gruff, reliable, no-nonsense role character actor", with "kindly eyes, droll manner and expressly Anglo-Saxon level-headedness". In 1967, Lee appeared in O.K. Connery, a spoof of the James Bond film series which starred Connery's brother Neil Connery, Lois Maxwell (Miss Moneypenny), and several former actors of the series. During this period he also appeared in several ITC television productions such as The Baron, Man in a Suitcase, and Danger Man. In 1972, he portrayed Tarmut the sculptor in Terence Fisher's Hammer Horror picture Frankenstein and the Monster from Hell, alongside Peter Cushing, Shane Briant, and David Prowse; it was not released until 1974.

== Personal life ==
On 30 January 1972, Lee's first wife, Gladys Merredew, died in a fire at their 17th-century home in Oare, Kent, which also left Lee hospitalised. According to the actor Jack Warner, "Bernard and Gladys had a lovely 17-century cottage in the Kent village of Oare, and it was there she died tragically in a fire early in 1972. Bernard and Gladys were trapped in their bedroom when the fire started on the ground floor. Bernard escaped through a window and ran to get a ladder in an attempt to rescue Gladys, but unhappily was unsuccessful. It was an awful end to a long and happy marriage." In February 1972, Lee was mugged and robbed by two youths. After the mugging and fire, Lee turned to drink, was unable to find work for two years, and ran into debt. By chance, Lee met Richard Burton in a pub, who, upon hearing of Lee's problems, gave him a cheque for $6,000 to clear his debts, together with a note saying that everyone has a spot of trouble once in a while. Burton's gift assisted Lee in overcoming his depression. In 1975, both Lee and Lois Maxwell accepted roles in their usual Bond characters in the poorly received French James Bond spoof, From Hong Kong with Love.

Three years after the fire, Lee married television director's assistant Ursula McHale. Lee's first marriage produced a daughter, Ann, who also followed her father onto the stage, and did so with his blessing, Lee saying "She's doing what she wants to do and enjoying every moment of it." Ann later married Alan Miller, a stage actor and later stage manager at the BBC: their son is the British actor Jonny Lee Miller. Lee's hobbies included golf, fishing, reading, music and sailing.

=== Death ===
In November 1980, Lee was admitted to the Royal Free Hospital in London, suffering from stomach cancer. He died there on 16 January 1981, at the age of 73; his wife Ursula was present at his death. After his death, Ursula joined Exit (now Dignity in Dying) after witnessing Lee's suffering. Lee was cremated at Golders Green Crematorium on 23 January 1981.

Lee died after filming began on For Your Eyes Only, but before he could film his scenes as M. Out of respect for Lee, no replacement was found, and the script was rewritten so that the character was said to be on leave. A year after Lee's death, Terence Pettigrew summarised his acting work as a "Gruff, reliable, no-nonsense role character actor, whose many credits include policemen, servicemen, father figures, and spy chiefs. Mostly shows the honest, hard-working face of officialdom, with only very occasional lapses." Lee was replaced in the role of M by Robert Brown, who acted with Lee in The Spy Who Loved Me.

== Filmography and other works ==
From 1962 to 1979 Lee featured in eleven James Bond films as the character M, Bond's superior:

Year	Film
1962	Dr. No
1963	From Russia with Love
1964	Goldfinger
1965	Thunderball
1967	You Only Live Twice
1969	On Her Majesty's Secret Service
1971	Diamonds Are Forever
1973	Live and Let Die
1974	The Man with the Golden Gun
1977	The Spy Who Loved Me
1979	Moonraker

Acting roles
New title	M actor in James Bond films 1962 –'79	Succeeded by Robert Brown
