= Michael Bastow =

British painter

Michael Bastow (born 1943 in Bideford) is a British painter. He lives and works between Paris and Malaucène.

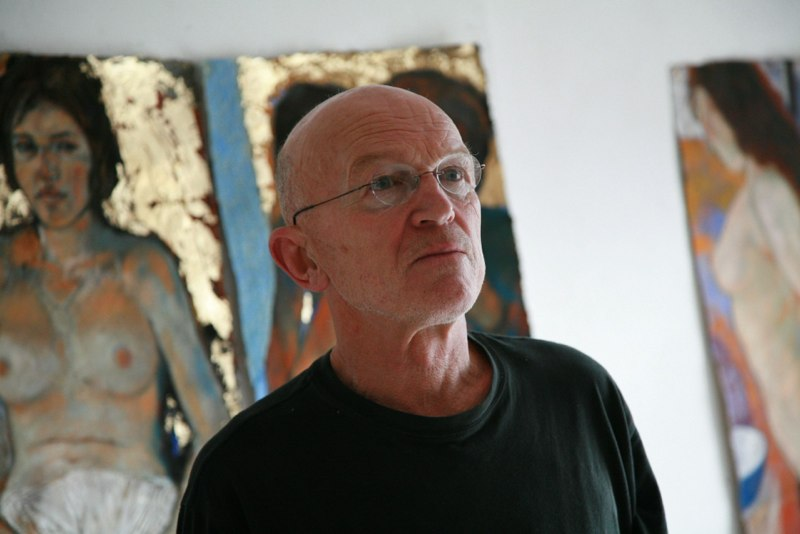
Michael Bastow

== Biography ==
When he was two years old, he emigrated with his parents in Australia. He began to practice drawing and painting very early but chose to study architecture at the University of Melbourne.

He returned to England in 1967 where he worked in the movie industry for 10 years. As production designer, he participated to the British television sitcom Father, Dear Father in 1968 and its spin-off film in 1973 and, as art director, to Neither the Sea Nor the Sand (1972), Not Now Darling (1973) and The Stud with Joan Collins in 1978.

He settled in Belgium in 1974 where he decided to devote entirely to painting and took as a unique subject: women's bodies, nude most of the time with sometimes some self-portrait. His technique is pastel on raw paper. Under an abundance of interlacing and colors, he tries to give the sensation of skin textures and architectures of women's bodies structured by light. On the contrary, his graphic work is different for a more raw representation of sexual pleasure.

He begins to regularly exhibit from the end of the 1970s and moved to Paris in 1982. He collaborated with the magazine Le Fou parle, directed by Jacques Vallet, where he met Roland Topor with whom he became friends. Topor wrote some texts on Michael Bastow's drawings, particularly the preface of the catalogue " Pastels 1986–1991 ", published in 1991. Bastow has also illustrated books by writers or intellectuals, like Violaine ou L'art d'ignorer by Marie Binet, Sans merci by the Belgian writer Hugo Claus, La Femme en majesté by anthropologist Françoise Héritier and " La Véritable nature de la vierge Marie " by Roland Topor.

At the beginning of the 1990s, his work was shown in public institutions: Stichting Veranneman in Kruishoutem in 1991, Les dix-huit ans d'expo du Cirque Divers at the Musée d'art moderne et contemporain in Liège in 1995, Centro Cultural Recoleta de Buenos Aires in 1996.

He settled in a second studio near the Mont Ventoux in 1995 and, six years later, he bought the St Alexis chapel in Malaucène (Vaucluse) to restore and redecorate it. Finally, the decoration becomes an ephemeral fresco, made with superposition of colored sheets and transparencies. Little by little, he transforms the chapel into a pictorial experience on the theme of the seven ages of life with the reappropriation of models of Byzantine icons and Africans masks.

In 2011, after having seen the exhibition about French and Chinese imperial courts in the eighteenth century, he started a new series named Chinese dream or 100 Chinese. Impressed by the portraits of the Qianlong Emperor and his wife the empress Xiao Xian painted by the Jesuit Giuseppe Castiglione, he decided to reuse the code of painting at the Chinese imperial court at that time (frontal portraits, with no modelling or chiaroscuro, attention to details and fabrics) to create an army of women, empresses, courtesans and warriors like the Terracotta Army in the tomb of Qin Shi Huang.

This series has been exhibited at the galerie Alain Blondel in Paris in 2013 and at the galerie De Zwarte Panter in Antwerp in 2014.

== Solo exhibitions (selection) ==
- 1983: galerie Jean Briance, Paris
- 1984: galerie Jean Briance, Paris. Galerie Isy Brachot, Brussels
- 1986: Tolarno Gallery, Melbourne
- 1987: galerie Jean Briance, Paris
- 1988: L’Autre Musée, Brussels
- 1991: Stichting Veranneman, Kruishoutem
- 1996: El Eterno femenino, Centro Cultural Recoleta, Buenos Aires
- 1997: galerie Catrin Alting, Antwerp
- 1999: Osiris Gallery, Brussels
- 2000: Cloître des Cordeliers, Tarascon
- 2002: Pastels et Bois Gravés, galerie Alain Blondel, Paris
- 2004: Pastels et fusains, galerie Alain Blondel, Paris
- 2007–2008: Installation de Sept panneaux, Chapelle Saint-Alexis, Malaucène
- 2008: 2ème cycle de dessins, Chapelle Saint-Alexis, Malaucène
- 2010: 3ème cycle de dessins, Chapelle Saint-Alexis, Malaucène
- 2013: Rêves chinois, galerie Alain Blondel, Paris
- 2014: 100 chinoises, galerie De Zwarte Panter, Antwerp
- 2022: Confinement Drawings (Variations on the Odalisque and Pinocchio's Nose), galerie Jean-Marie Oger, Paris

== Collective exhibitions (selection) ==
- 1980: Palais des Beaux-Arts, Brussels
- 1995: Les dix-huit ans d'expo du Cirque Divers, Musée d'Art Moderne de la Ville (MAMAC), Liège
- 2013: L’Embarras du choix – la peinture figurative dans les collections du FRAC Franche-Comté
- 2016: Still life – Style of life, Jean-Marie Oger, Paris

== See also ==
=== Bibliography ===
- Michael Bastow – Pastels, exhibition catalogue with texts by Marc Augé, Marc Cholodenko, Freddy de Vree, Roland Topor, Galerie Jean Briance, 1987.
- Bastow – La piscine et l'atelier, exhibition catalogue with a text by Marc Augé, Galerie Alain Blondel, 1998.
- Michael Bastow – Pastels 1986 – 1991, preface by Roland Topor, Coll. Visions, Ramsay, Paris, 1991.
- La Femme en majesté, Michael Bastow and Françoise Héritier, Editions Philias, 2011.

=== Illustrations ===
- Hugo Claus, Zij, Acme éditions, Paris, 1993.
- Roland Topor, La Véritable nature de la vierge Marie, éditions du Rocher, 1996.
- Marie Binet, Violaine ou L'art d'ignorer, Dumerchez et éditions Humus, 1999.
- Hugo Claus, Sans merci, Dumerchez, 2000.

=== External links ===
- Official website
- Jean-Marie Oger Gallery
