= Gladys Merredew =

British actress (1905–1972)

- Born: Gladys Emily Merredew; 5 January 1905
- Died: 30 January 1972 (aged 67)
- Other names: Gladys Merridew; Gladys Meridew
- Occupations: actress, singer
- Years active: 1930s
- Spouse: Bernard Lee (m. 1934)

Gladys Emily Merredew (5 January 1905 – 30 January 1972) was a British actress and singer, sometimes credited as Gladys Merridew or Gladys Meridew. She was married to the actor Bernard Lee, and died in a house fire.

== Life and career ==
Merredew was one of the earliest British entertainers to appear on television. She appeared in 1930.

A 1930 issue of Electronic Engineering said "Here are some of the artists who have quite recently appeared on your "Televisors" and a number of whom will again be seen and heard during the month of July," including Merredew. The journal said she "sings songs of a light character with that facial expression so essential to television."

Merredew married actor Bernard Lee in 1934. They had a daughter named Ann Gladys in 1942 who may have also become an actress. Ann Lee married the actor Alan Miller in 1970; the actor Jonny Lee Miller is their son.

In 1934 Merredew appeared at the Annual Dinner for Lord Williams's School held at the Florence Restaurant on Piccadilly Circus alongside Bertha Wilmott, The Western Brothers and Norman Long. "For the first time, a microphone was installed."

Jack Warner says Merredew was an "outstanding Fol-de-Rols artiste". Rex Newman had invited Warner to join the troupe in 1938. The company was split off into different concert parties: Warner joined "Rex Newman and his Dancing Coachmen". (Don't know if Merredew was part of this same specific concert party.)

Between 1940 and 1946 Bernard Lee was in wartime service with the Royal Sussex Regiment

Cyril Fletcher describes her as the "Eastbourne comedienne" and mentions an incident when Bob and Dolly Harbin's dog bit her. Dolly Harbin was disfigured in a dressing room fire at some point.

She died on 30 January 1972 in a house fire. According to actor Jack Warner, "Bernard and Gladys had a lovely seventeenth-century cottage in the Kent village of Oare, and it was there she died tragically in a fire early in 1972. Bernard and Gladys were trapped in their bedroom when the fire started on the ground floor. Bernard escaped through a window and ran to get a ladder in an attempt to rescue Gladys but unhappily was unsuccessful. It was an awful end to a long and happy marriage."

== Credits ==
=== Film ===
- Idle Dreams (1933)
- I Would if I Could... (1933) "Gladys Merredew 1933".
- The Baby's View of Things (1934) "Gladys Merredew 1934".
- Cows and Fishes (1936)
- Children First and Last (1936) "Gladys Merridew On Sleeve As Glady's Meridew".

== Bibliography ==
- Fletcher, Cyril (1978). Nice One, Cyril: Being the Odd Odessey and the Anecdotage of a Comedian. Barrie & Jenkins. ISBN 9780214205811.
- Gifford, Denis (1998). Entertainers in British Films: A Century of Showbiz in the Cinema. Flicks Books. ISBN 9780948911767.
- Warner, Jack (1975). Jack of All Trades: An Autobiography.
