= Hankow Road =

Street in Hong Kong

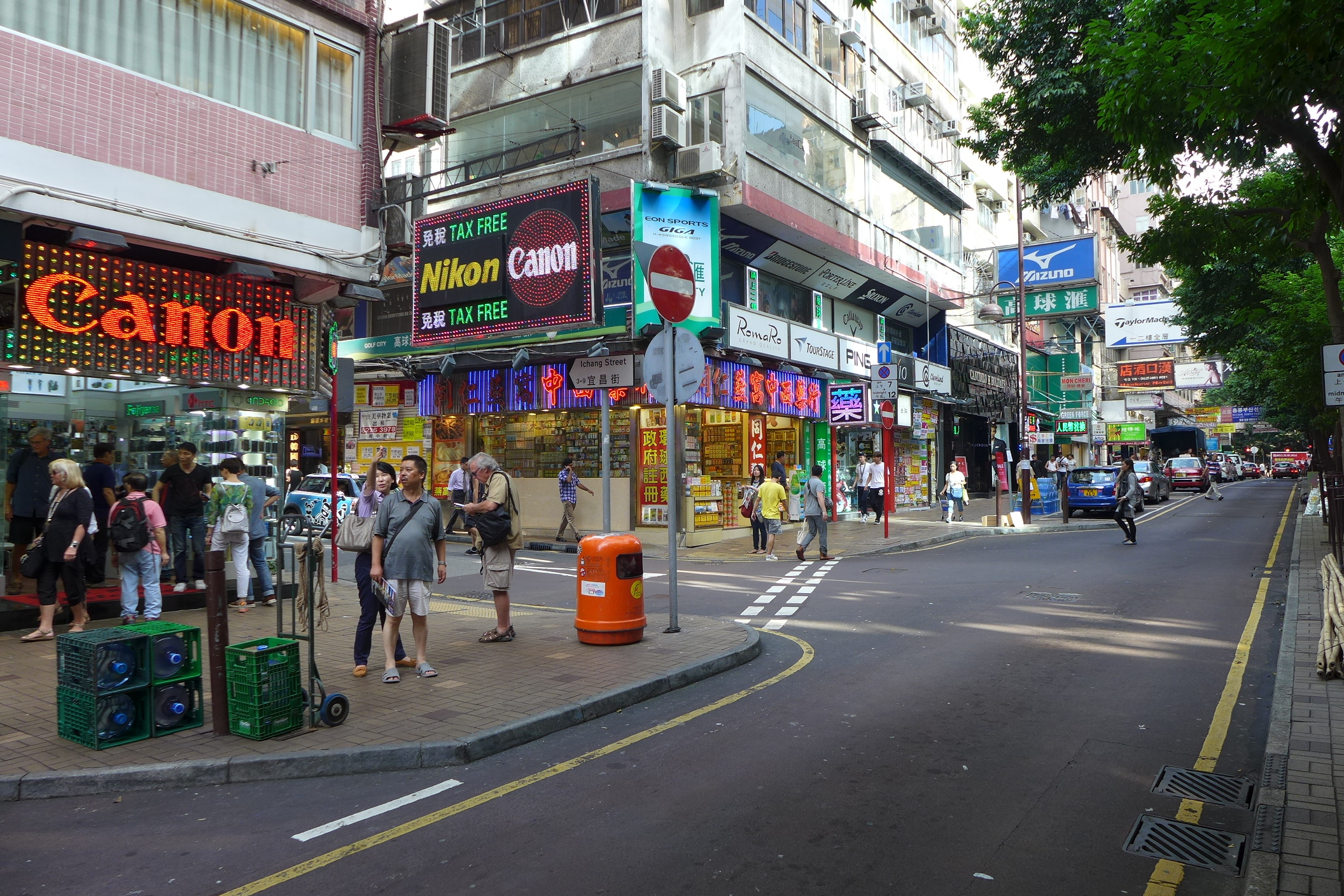
Hankow Road

Hankow Road (Chinese: 漢口道) is a street in Tsim Sha Tsui, Kowloon, Hong Kong. It runs north-south from Salisbury Road to Haiphong Road and is 370 metres long. It was initially named Garden Road but was renamed in 1909 after the Hubei city of Hankow, to avoid confusion with another road of the same name in Central.

== See also ==
- List of streets and roads in Hong Kong
