= Solitaire (James Bond) =

- James Bond character
- Jane Seymour as Solitaire
- First appearance: 1954
- Last appearance: 1973
- Created by: Ian Fleming
- Portrayed by: Jane Seymour

In-universe information
- Gender: Female
- Classification: Bond girl

Solitaire is a fictional character in the James Bond novel and film Live and Let Die. In the film, she was portrayed by Jane Seymour.

== Novel biography ==
In a relative rarity for the James Bond franchise, there is little difference between the film and novel in the treatment of Solitaire's basic character and role. The 1954 novel Live and Let Die reveals that her real name is Simone Latrelle, that she is of French stock, and she was born in Haiti; the name "Solitaire" (a near-oronym of her real name) is given to her by the Haitians because of her apparent exclusion of men from her life. The only physical difference appears to be that Solitaire is stated to have blue-black hair; she also possesses pale skin reminiscent of the tropical planter class. When James Bond meets her she is twenty-five years old and described as "one of the most beautiful women Bond had ever seen." On a later occasion Bond describes her as looking "rather French and very beautiful." At their first meeting, in the presence of Mr. Big, she comes across as superior, cold, and disdainful, an attitude reflected by her face, which Bond finds beautiful partly because of its lack of compromise and its hint of both cruelty and command. Once Solitaire has escaped from Mr. Big, she immediately becomes warm, open, and passionate towards Bond. Despite her obvious Gallic-Haitian heritage, there is no mention of her having any French accent.

Solitaire was initiated into some of the practices of Voodoo while still a child in Haiti. Either naturally or through this initiation, she has an extrasensory ability both to foretell the future and to judge the veracity of others, even if they converse in a language that she does not speak. These gifts instilled great fear of her among those who know her. Mr. Big discovered her doing a mind-reading act in a Haitian cabaret and, recognizing the value of her abilities, took her into his employ, using her in his espionage operations and planning for her eventually to have his children. Solitaire becomes, more or less, his hostage, with little or no autonomy, and when he uses her to interrogate Bond, her mental abilities immediately tell her that he is the one who will rescue her. She thus covers for Bond by lying to Mr. Big, telling him that Bond is not out to get the gangster. She later escapes from Mr. Big and accompanies Bond on his assignment, though the gangster locates and kidnaps her, ultimately attempting, unsuccessfully, to kill both her and Bond by towing them over a Jamaican reef (a scenario adapted for the film version of For Your Eyes Only). The effort fails when Mr. Big's boat is destroyed by a mine Bond had earlier planted. The novel ends with Solitaire preparing to accompany Bond on his post-assignment recuperative leave.

Unlike in the film, there is no evidence that Solitaire would lose her psychic powers after sexual congress, an eventuality that does not appear due to a broken finger Bond sustains and his need to stay vigilant during their only night together. As is the case in the film, she is apparently a virgin, and she gives every sign of wishing to have a sexual relationship with Bond, going so far as to initiate their first physical contact and later teasing him with her nudity. While the culmination never comes to pass in the novel, the indications are that it will happen during their shared vacation as the story concludes. Unusually for one of Ian Fleming's heroines, what becomes of Solitaire after Live and Let Die is never explained; in Dr. No, when returning to Jamaica, Bond finds himself wondering about her whereabouts.

== Film biography ==
In the 1973 film Live and Let Die, Solitaire (Jane Seymour) is a psychic in the employ of Dr. Kananga (Yaphet Kotto). As James Bond (Roger Moore) travels to New York by plane, Solitaire describes his journey to Dr. Kananga through the use of Tarot cards. The one drawback to her ability is that she must remain a virgin in order to preserve it.

After Bond follows Kananga to the Fillet of Soul restaurant, he meets Solitaire. After a rather brief encounter with Mr. Big, Bond asks Solitaire about his future. When instructed to pick up a card Bond quizzically comments "us?” after picking up The Lovers card.

When Bond and Rosie Carver (Gloria Hendry) visit San Monique, Solitaire tells Kananga the future, once more picking The Lovers card in regard to Bond, but for the first time she lies to him about what she sees, saying that it is the Death card. When her false reading proves to be inaccurate, she incurs Kananga's anger. He points out that her mother had had the gift too, but lost it and so became useless to him (presumably by losing her virginity and perhaps resulting in Solitaire's birth). Later that evening Bond returns to the island. After convincing Solitaire they are meant to be lovers, by the use of a Tarot deck secretly composed of only The Lover cards, Bond succeeds in seducing her. After losing her virginity to Bond, Solitaire loses her psychic power, which endangers her life. Bond discovers Kananga is hiding vast areas of opium poppy fields. Bond and Solitaire evade Kananga's men, escaping in Quarrel Jr. (Roy Stewart)'s boat.

After arriving in New Orleans, Bond and Solitaire are captured and taken to Mr. Big, who is revealed to be Kananga in disguise. Before Bond can be given his skydiving lesson without a parachute, he manages to escape. Solitaire is recaptured by Kananga's henchmen and taken back to him.

Later, Felix Leiter (David Hedison) informs Bond that after a raid on the Fillet of Soul, Kananga has taken Solitaire back to San Monique where she is to be sacrificed in a voodoo ceremony, leaving three Tarot cards: The High Priestess, The Moon, and Death. After travelling to San Monique, Bond rescues Solitaire from being sacrificed and kills Kananga while Quarrel Jr. destroys the opium poppy fields.

== Analysis ==
Screenwriter Tom Mankiewicz has stated that although Solitaire is a white person in the novel, he initially wrote her as black, with Diana Ross in mind. United Artists president David Picker objected, however, on the basis that there were several countries where the film could not be released if there were relations between Bond and Solitaire. According to Ian Kinane, even though Solitaire is French Haitian in the book,

The casting of British actress Jane Seymour as Solitaire eradicates from the narrative those concerns regarding the character's cultural hybridity... thus marking her realignment by Bond in politico-ideological and not racial terms. While Solitaire's religious and spiritual practices are discernibly non-Western (and therefore threatening to the ordered rigidity of British Christendom), Seymour's whiteness does much to mitigate such fears in the viewers' eyes: her whiteness aligns Solitaire's powers of the obeah less with Black primitivism and more with a sublimated Christian religiosity.

Joyce Goggin argues that Solitaire is at the center of the film: "many of the remarkable and strange features that contribute to the uniqueness of both novel and film are related precisely to voodoo, superstition and the Tarot, here given an added frisson through a highly eroticised medium in the person of Solitaire." Goggin also suggests that Solitaire "functions as very liquid panoply of stereotypical markers of Otherness and sexuality."

Patrick Maille notes that Solitaire is naïve about sexuality and compares her to a damsel in distress. Monica Germanà draws on Linda Welter's study of European/Anatolian folkloric dress to connect Solitaire's dress with the preoccupation the film has with her virginity:

The emphasis on Solitaire's chastity is conveyed, to begin with, by the high neckline of her first appearance in ethnic dress, and the colour red, which, with its associations with blood, and, in turn, menstruation and childbirth, is simultaneously used to foreshadow a bride's loss of virginity and future fertility in ethnic bridal gowns. Later, in St Monique, the bridal motif is pursued through a more revealing red dress, elaborate headdress, and a green cape studded with red stones; since Solitaire is about to lose her virginity to Bond, her neckline has dropped. Back in New York, the neckline plunges down to a butterfly appliqué stitched on the high waist of the red and gold dress she wears on her last tarot reading session.

Britni Dutz sees the initial shots of Solitaire as an example of scopophilia, illustrating Laura Mulvey's "gaze theory":

In the fleeting introductory shots of Solitaire, she is introduced to the viewer not as a character, but a “girl,” a silent doll who is dressing up... These shots establish Solitaire as an example of Mulvey's object of the gaze, as an object for pleasurable looking.
