= Birg (Bernese Alps) =

Mountain in Switzerland

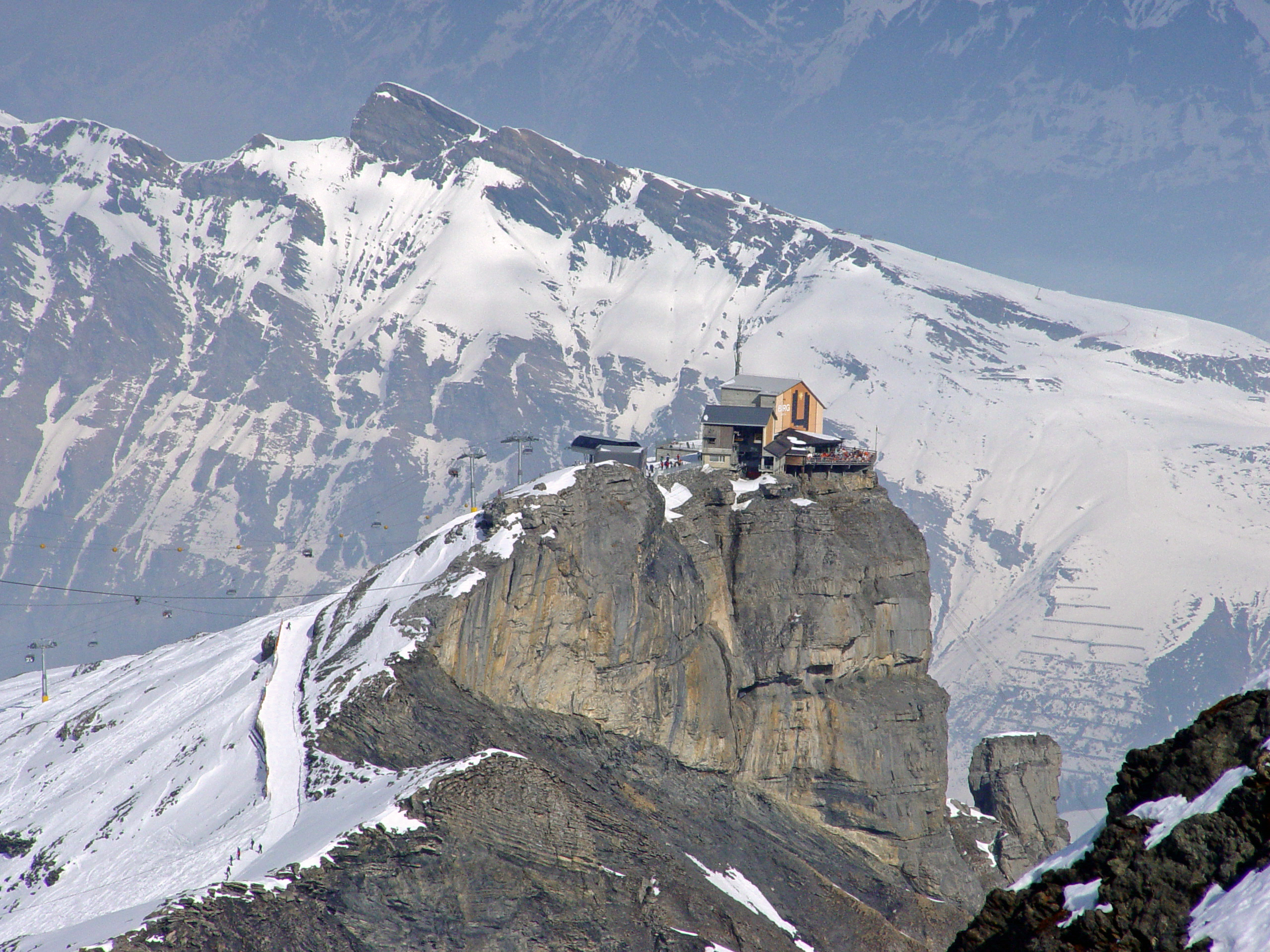

Highest point
- Elevation: 2684 metres (8806 ft)
- Prominence: 86 m (282 ft)
- Coordinates: 46°33′42″N 07°51′21″E

Geography
- Location within Switzerland
- Country: Switzerland
- Canton: Bern
- Parent range: Bernese Alps

Birg (2684 m) is a summit of the Bernese Alps, overlooking the valley of Lauterbrunnen in the canton of Bern. It lies on the east flank of the Schilthorn, above the village of Mürren.

In winter Birg is part of a ski area and several cable car stations are located on its summit. Birg is also an intermediate station between Mürren and the Schilthorn.

Birg appears as the ski station nearest to Blofeld's alpine headquarters Piz Gloria in the James Bond film "On Her Majesty's Secret Service." It is first seen from a helicopter, but also has a scene set on it later on.

== See also ==
- List of mountains of Switzerland accessible by public transport
