= Bortreist på ubestemt tid (film) =

- Directed by: Pål Bang-Hansen
- Written by: Pål Bang-Hansen; Sigrun Krokvik (novel)
- Starring: Svein Scharffenberg; Ingerid Vardund; Julie Ege; Lasse Kolstad
- Release date: 1974
- Running time: 100 minutes
- Country: Norway
- Language: Norwegian

Bortreist på ubestemt tid (English: Gone until further notice) is a 1974 Norwegian crime film directed by Pål Bang-Hansen, starring Svein Scharffenberg, Ingerid Vardund, Julie Ege and Lasse Kolstad. It is based on the novel by Sigrun Krokvik. The painter Alex (Scharffenberg) has just murdered his wife Christina (Ege), when Helen (Vardund) arrives at his house.
