= Pål Bang-Hansen =

Norwegian actor, writer and director (1937–2010)

- Born: Pål Bang-Hansen; 29 July 1937; Oslo, Norway
- Died: 25 March 2010 (aged 72)
- Occupations: Actor, reporter, film critic, film director, screenwriter
- Spouse: Oddbjorg Havik
- Relatives: Odd Bang-Hansen (father); Kjetil Bang-Hansen (brother)
- Writing career
- Period: 1949–2010
- Genre: Film
- Notable works: Skrift i sne; Douglas; Norske byggeklosser; Kronprinsen
- Notable awards: Gullruten, Amanda Honorary Award

Pål Bang-Hansen (29 July 1937 – 25 March 2010) was a Norwegian actor, film director, screenwriter and film critic. He is remembered as a television personality and film expert at the Norwegian Broadcasting Corporation, leading the television film show Filmmagasinet for more than thirty years.

== Early life and career ==
Bang-Hansen was born in Oslo, the son of writer Odd Bang-Hansen (1908–1984) and physician Elise Aas. He was married to Oddbjørg Havik, and was the brother of actor and theatre director Kjetil Bang-Hansen (born 1940). As a young boy he regularly participated in audio plays for children. Among his main characters were the master detective "Blomkvist" in adaptations of Astrid Lindgren's children's books (the Bill Bergson series). He made his film debut as a child, when he played the character "Sofus" in Arne Skouen's film Gategutter from 1949. He played the character "Tom" in the children's film Tom og Mette på sporet from 1952, directed by Lauritz Falk, based a book by Bang-Hansen's father. After finishing his examen artium in 1957 he worked for a time on film commercials. He studied film in Italy at Centro Sperimentale di Cinematografia, the Italian National film school, from 1959 to 1961, and spent one year with the Italian film industry. He was a journalist and film critic for the newspaper Arbeiderbladet from 1962 to 1966.

== Film director ==
Bang-Hansen directed six films. His first film production was Skrift i sne (Script in Snow) from 1966. He produced the agent film Douglas in 1970. His satirical film Norske byggeklosser (1972) was a great success. In 1973 he made the film Kanarifuglen, and in 1974 the thriller Bortreist på ubestemt tid, based on a crime novel by Sigrun Krokvik. His last film was the political drama Kronprinsen from 1979, based on a true story, with Bjørn Sundquist making his debut in the leading role.

== Film critic ==
Despite his success as a filmmaker Bang-Hansen has for several generations been best known throughout Norway as one of the nation's leading film critics, while working in that capacity for the Norwegian Broadcasting Corporation (NRK) for forty years, from 1967 to 2007. He was anchor for the regular television show Filmmagasinet from 1966 to 1989. Another of his film programs was I objektivet from 1969 to 1976, where he introduced more special films to the public. In his role at NRK he was the one and only film presenter on Norwegian television for decades.

Bang-Hansen regularly reported from film festivals in Europe, notably from the Cannes Film Festival consecutively for more than forty years, and also the Berlin Film Festival and the Lübeck Nordic Film Days. Over the years he conducted interviews with Alfred Hitchcock, Gina Lollobrigida, Peter Sellers, and Jodie Foster. He is the only Norwegian to have interviewed John Lennon.

== Writer ==
Among his books are Dager med Douglas from 1970, 24 ganger i sekundet from 1988, and Norske filmplakatar 1917–1988 from 1989. He has also written travel books. Among his posthumous works is a film script about an undercover resistance group from World War II, a branch of the clandestine organization XU.

== Awards ==
Bang-Hansen was awarded the Gullruten honorary prize in 2001. In 2002 he was given the Amanda Honorary Award, shared with Rolv Wesenlund. He was awarded the Aamot statuette in 2009. Shortly before his death, in March 2010, he was awarded the order Den Hvide Knap from the Norwegian Students' Society's theatre Teater Neuf in Oslo. On 2 June 2005 Bang-Hansen was awarded the Knight of the Order of Merit of the Italian Republic.

He died in March 2010, having been diagnosed with skin cancer a week before.

== Selected filmography ==
- Trost i taklampa (1955)
- Kvinnens plass (1956)
- Skrift i sne (1966)
- Douglas (1970)
- Norske byggeklosser (1972)
- Kanarifuglen (1973)
- Bortreist på ubestemt tid (1974)
- Kronprinsen (1979)
