= Bortreist på ubestemt tid =

1972 novel by Sigrun Krokvik

- Author: Sigrun Krokvik
- Language: Norwegian
- Genre: crime fiction
- Published: 1972
- Publication place: Norway
- Awards: The Riverton Prize (1972)

Bortreist på ubestemt tid is a crime novel published in 1972 by the Norwegian writer Sigrun Krokvik. For this novel Krokvik was awarded the very first Riverton Prize in 1972, a prize which has since been awarded annually for the best literary crime product in Norwegian language. The novel was adapted into the film Bortreist på ubestemt tid from 1974, directed by Pål Bang-Hansen.
