= Arme, syndige menneske =

- Directed by: Egil Kolstø
- Written by: Egil Kolstø; Hans Magnus Ystgaard
- Starring: Svein Scharffenberg; Anne Marie Ottersen
- Release date: 17 October 1980
- Running time: 167 minutes
- Country: Norway
- Language: Norwegian

Arme, syndige menneske (English: Poor, sinful man) is a 1980 Norwegian drama film directed by Egil Kolstø, starring Svein Scharffenberg and Anne Marie Ottersen. Journalist Erik Mogensen (Scharffenberg) from Oslo travels to Copenhagen to report on drug abuse in the city. Mogensen himself struggles with alcoholism, and has previously been committed to a mental institution. During his stay in Copenhagen, his drinking problem gets worse.
