= Cabin Fever (2000 film) =

- Directed by: Mona J. Hoel
- Written by: Mona J. Hoel
- Starring: Svein Scharffenberg; Gørild Mauseth; Zbigniew Zamachowski; Kari Simonsen; Bjarte Hjelmeland
- Release date: 24 November 2000
- Running time: 102 minutes
- Country: Norway
- Language: Norwegian

Cabin Fever (Norwegian: Når nettene blir lange) is a 2000 Norwegian drama film written and directed by Mona J. Hoel, starring Svein Scharffenberg and Gørild Mauseth. It was the first attempt in Norway at a Dogme film. The film portrays an extended family vacationing together in a cabin in the mountains, and the internal conflicts that emerge.

== Plot ==
The film begins during Christmas in Norway. A family and all of their relatives decide to stay at a remote cabin to celebrate the holidays. Their Polish relatives join them. When they arrive the Polish relatives are annoyed that there is a lack of water and no electricity. As family arguments begin to break out, the film reveals the characters reasonings and grudges against one another. Secrets are revealed. One of the children has severe asthma problem which is made worse by the presence of a dog. The father, additionally, can't control his alcohol problem. He then becomes aggressive making the situations worse than it is. Towards the end of the film the father drinks so much alcohol that he collapses. The family throws him out into the freezing cold where he is never found again. The family members are heartbroken that father Gunnar is gone.

== Cast ==
- Svein Scharffenberg as Gunnar
- Gørild Mauseth as Liv
- Zbigniew Zamachowski as Brother-in-law
- Kari Simonsen as Astrid
- Bjarte Hjelmeland as Eivind
- Benedikte Lindbeck as Siri
- Geir Kvarme as Per Arne
- Turid Gunnes as Kari
- Wieslawa Mazurkiewicz as Irina
- Krister Henriksson as Svensken
- Jerzy Nowak as Olek

== Awards ==
In 2001, Cabin Fever (Nar nettene blir lange) was nominated for three awards. Two of those were for the Amanda Award. They were able to win one award for best actor Svein Scharffenberg. Best actress Kari Simonsen came up short to Hildegun Riise ( from Detector). Cabin Fever also had a nominee in the Crystal Globe. Director Mona J. Hoel.

== Reviews ==
According to Per haddal, from Aftenposten, "…the camera dive so skin close to the action, everything seems extremely alive, spontaneous and has loads of nerve and nerves-almost barock situations mixed with the painful truths of dysfunctional family relations… a stunning experience…".

According to Per Ivar Henriksbo, from Gulbrandsdolen, "…this film is like a mental preparation for the ritual celebration we all have to go through in about a months time…use it as a rehearsal".

== See also ==
- List of Christmas films
