= Julie Ege =

Norwegian actress (1943–2008)

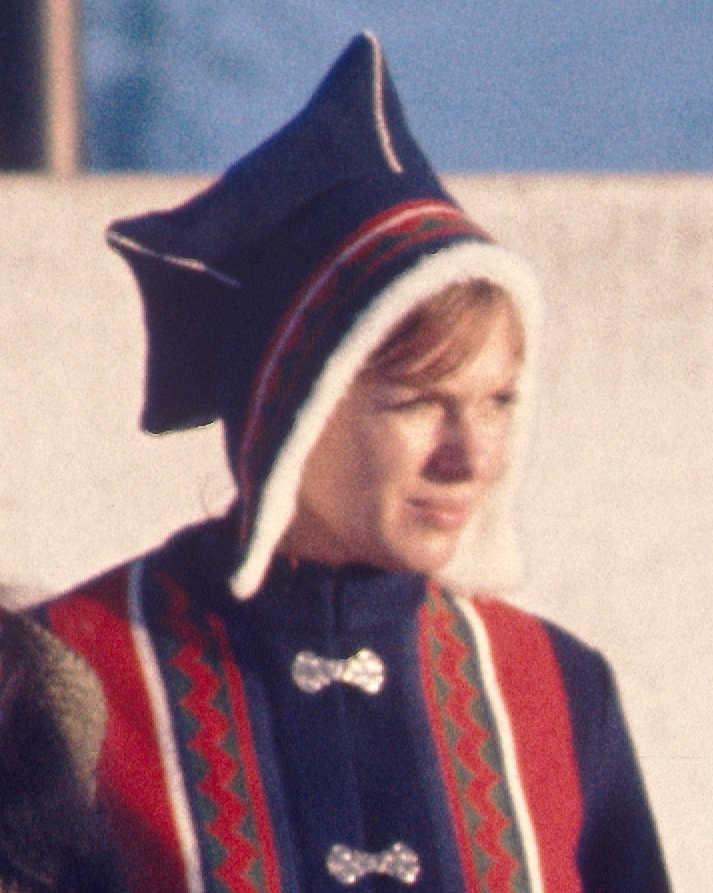
- Julie Ege on location in Switzerland filming On Her Majesty's Secret Service, 1968
- Born: 12 November 1943; Sandnes, Norway
- Died: 29 April 2008 (aged 64); Oslo, Norway
- Occupations: Actress, model
- Years active: 1967–1998

Julie Ege (Norwegian pronunciation: [ˈjʉːlɪə ˈèːɡə]; 12 November 1943 – 29 April 2008) was a Norwegian actress, model and beauty pageant titleholder. She appeared in many British films of the 1960s and 1970s.

== Early life ==
Ege was born in Sandnes, the daughter of brickyard worker Marton Ege and Hjørdis Halvorsen. At the age of 15, she began to work as a model. In 1962, she came second in Miss Norway at the age of 18, and subsequently participated in Miss Universe 1962. In 1967, she moved to England to work as an au pair to improve her English, and there also studied at a language school.

== Career ==
She made her film debut in a low-budget Norwegian film Stompa til sjøs (Stompa at Sea). She was a Penthouse Pet of May which landed her a role in 1969's On Her Majesty's Secret Service as Helen, the "Scandinavian girl". She later starred in Hammer Film Productions' Creatures the World Forgot and The Legend of the 7 Golden Vampires. Her other appearances include Every Home Should Have One with Marty Feldman, Not Now, Darling with Leslie Phillips and the Gluttony segment of The Magnificent Seven Deadly Sins.

Ege is probably best remembered for her role in the 1971 comedy hit film Up Pompeii alongside Frankie Howerd. She played Voluptua, a Roman ruler. Her voice, however, was overdubbed by Sheila Steafel (uncredited) for the film. On being introduced to Lance Percival's character, who says "Madame, it's a pleasure", her famous response is "Yes, I know. I've tried it". On 22 August 1971, she presented Ivan Mauger with the European Speedway title trophy at Wembley before a crowd of around 75,000. In a UK TV documentary a few years before her death, she stated that she never minded being labelled a glamour actress and that it had been a good life that basically helped pay the bills. She returned to Norway and did a few films before qualifying as a registered nurse in 1998. She lived in Oslo, where she worked as a nurse.

== Personal life ==
Ege was twice married and divorced in the 1960s and had two daughters. In the '70s she lived with The Beatles' tour roadie Tony Bramwell, and later with the Norwegian author Anders Bye. After her movie and modelling career she finished her secondary education and studied nursing. She later graduated from the University of Oslo where she studied History and English, after which she finished her nursing exams and continued working in the public health sector in Oslo. Her career, as well as her illness is described in detail in her autobiography, Naken (Naked), published in 2002.

== Death ==
She died from breast cancer, aged 64 on 29 April 2008. She had previously been treated for both breast cancer and lung cancer.

== Filmography ==
- Robbery (1967) – Hostess (uncredited)
- Stompa til Sjøs! (1967)
- On Her Majesty's Secret Service (1969) – The Scandinavian girl
- Every Home Should Have One (1970) – Inga Giltenburg
- Up Pompeii (1971) – Voluptua
- Creatures the World Forgot (1971) – Nala – The Girl
- The Magnificent Seven Deadly Sins (1971) – Ingrid (segment "Gluttony")
- Go for a Take (1972) – April
- Rentadick (1972) – Utta Armitage
- The Alf Garnett Saga (1972) – Herself
- Not Now, Darling (1973) – Janie McMichael
- Kanarifuglen (1973) – Kari, flyvertinne
- The Final Programme (1973) – Miss Dazzle
- Craze (1974) – Helena
- The Legend of the 7 Golden Vampires (1974) – Vanessa Buren
- Percy's Progress (1974) – Miss Hanson
- Den siste Fleksnes (1974) – Herself
- The Mutations (1974) – Hedi
- Bortreist på ubestemt tid (1974) – Christina
- The Amorous Milkman (1975) – Diana
- De Dwaze Lotgevallen von Sherlock Jones (1975) – Sondag's secretaresse
- Fengslende dager for Christina Berg (1988) – Krags hustru

== Autobiography ==
- Naken (Naked) H. Aschehoug & Co (W. Nygaard). Oslo 2002. ISBN 82-03-22706-6
