= Odd Bang-Hansen =

Norwegian educator, journalist and author

Odd Bang-Hansen (9 April 1908 – 4 March 1984) was a Norwegian educator, journalist and author.

== Biography ==
He was born in Kristiania (now Oslo), Norway. His parents were Lauritz Bang-Hansen (1879–1960) and Astri Halvorsen (1880–1971). His father was a Lutheran priest who was later assigned to parishes in Vadsø Municipality and Kristiansund Municipality. He received a cand.philol. degree in 1934 from the University of Oslo. He became an associate professor at the Oslo Commerce School (Oslo Handelsgymnasium) in the late 1930s.

During the Occupation of Norway by Nazi Germany, he sent his wife and children to live in Stockholm. He was actively involved in the Norwegian resistance movement, making a significant effort to help Norwegian Jews out of the country. In 1943, he was forced to re-locate to Great Britain where he was a consultant working with British officers in support of the Norwegian resistance. After the Liberation of Norway at the end of World War II, he was attached to the Labour Party publication Arbeiderbladet (now Dagsavisen) as a film and theater critic. He remained at the newspaper as a journalist until his death in 1984.

He made his literary debut in 1938 with the novel Fager er studentens drøm. He wrote several children's books, including Mette og Tom i fjellet (1948), and Trapp med 9 trinn (1952). He was chairman of the Norwegian Authors' Union from 1965 to 1971.

== Selected works ==
- Mette og Tom i fjellet (1948
- Mette og Tom og bokstavene (1949)
- Mette og Tom i hulen (1951)
- Trapp med 9 trinn (1952)
- Fly, hvite due (1953)
- Spillemann på flukt (1957)
- Fra mitt spisebord (1973)

== Personal life ==
He married the physician Elise Aas (1907–2002) in 1936. He was the father of the theatre director Kjetil Bang-Hansen (born 1940) and the film producer Pål Bang-Hansen (1937–2010).

Awards
| Preceded by André Bjerke | Recipient of the Bastian Prize; 1959 | Succeeded by Hartvig Kiran |
