= Bietenhorn =

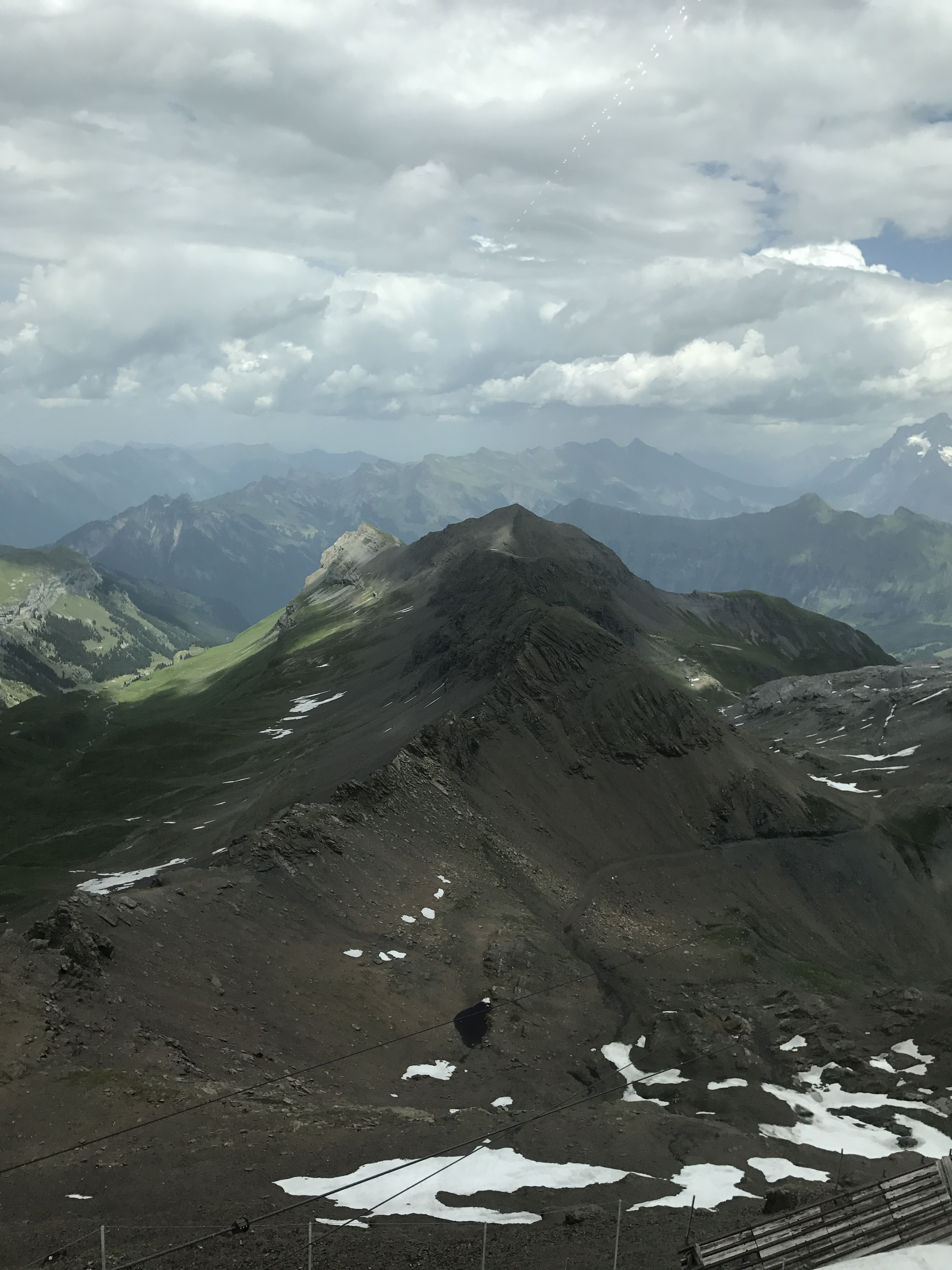
- Bietenhorn mountain seen from Schilthorn, Switzerland

Highest point
- Elevation: 2,756 m (9,042 ft)
- Prominence: 117 m (384 ft)
- Parent peak: Schilthorn
- Coordinates: 46°34′38″N 7°51′53″E

Geography
- Location within Switzerland
- Location: Bern, Switzerland
- Parent range: Bernese Alps

The Bietenhorn is a mountain of the Bernese Alps, located north of Mürren in the Bernese Oberland. It lies north-east of the Schilthorn, on the range between the Soustal and the main Lauterbrunnen valley.

== See also ==
- List of mountains of Switzerland
