= Creatures the World Forgot =

- Theatrical release poster
- Directed by: Don Chaffey
- Written by: Michael Carreras
- Produced by: Michael Carreras
- Starring: Julie Ege; Brian O'Shaughnessy
- Cinematography: Vincent Cox
- Edited by: Chris Barnes
- Music by: Mario Nascimbene
- Production company: Hammer Film Productions
- Distributed by: Columbia Pictures
- Release dates: 18 April 1971 (UK); 1 September 1971 (USA)
- Running time: 95 mins.
- Country: United Kingdom
- Language: English
- Budget: £420,000

Creatures the World Forgot is a 1971 British adventure film directed by Don Chaffey, produced and written for Hammer Films by Michael Carreras. The film concentrates on the daily struggle to survive of a tribe of Stone Age people. Notably the story is told with minimal dialogue, relying instead on grunts, gestures and physical action.

== Plot ==
A volcano erupts and an earthquake opens up a crevasse, swallowing up many members of the 'Dark Tribe'. The tribal leader is killed and a fight for leadership between two survivors, Mak (Brian O'Shaughnessy) and Zen, soon breaks out. Mak is victorious and leads the surviving tribe members across a desert in search of a new home. They meet and befriend a tribe of fair-haired people. The leader of the fair-haired people presents Mak with a girl, Noo, as a wife. Mak offers a girl in exchange, but she already has a mate. She tries to escape with her mate, but they are caught and killed. The Dark tribe move on and eventually settle in a fertile valley where they flourish. Noo gives birth to twin boys on the same day another woman gives birth to a mute girl. The tribe demand that the girl be sacrificed, but a lightning strike convinces the tribe's old witch to adopt her as her apprentice.

Years later, the now adolescent twins, dark haired Rool and fair haired Toomak, fight for their father's attention. Rool tries to rape the mute girl. She escapes but falls into the grasp of a marauding tribe. Toomak leads Mak and the other tribesmen to the marauders' cave. A battle ensues and the marauders' chief is killed by Toomak. Toomak rescues the mute girl and takes the defeated chief's daughter, Nala, as his wife. Mak names Toomak as his successor as tribal chief and then dies of wounds sustained in the battle. Rool disputes the decision and he fights with Toomak in a ritualised battle. On the brink of victory, Toomak spares his brother's life. Toomak decides to leave, taking Nala and half the tribe with him. Consumed with hatred for his brother, Rool decides to track Toomak down. Rool and his men are attacked by a forest tribe, but are rescued by Toomak. Rool, still hating his brother, abducts Nala. Toomak chases after Rool. At the top of a cliff, Rool stakes Nala to a pyre. Toomak and Rool fight whilst Nala frees herself (only to be caught in the grasp of a python). Toomak saves Nala but ends up about to be slain by Rool, but the mute girl stabs the latter whilst an effigy of Rool is crushed by the old witch. Rool falls down the cliff to his death.

== Production ==
All of the exterior sequences were shot in Namibia and South Africa. The film is the fourth and last of Hammer's "Cave Girl" sequence of films, directed by Don Chaffey and assistant director Simon Petersen, preceded by One Million Years B.C. (1966) (also directed by Don Chaffey), Prehistoric Women (1967) and When Dinosaurs Ruled the Earth (1970). Like the other films, it trades heavily on the audience appeal of scantily-clad tribeswomen. This film eschews the stop-motion animated dinosaurs of the first and third of the series.

Creatures the World Forgot is not related to two later, similarly titled films, The Land That Time Forgot (1975), and The People That Time Forgot (1977). Made by Amicus Productions and adapted from novels by Edgar Rice Burroughs, both films starred Doug McClure.

== Cast ==
- Julie Ege as Nala
- Tony Bonner as Toomak
- Brian O'Shaughnessy as Mak
- Robert John as Rool
- Sue Wilson as Noo
- Rosalie Crutchley as The Old Crone
- Marcia Fox as The Dumb Girl
- Don Leonard as The Old Leader
