= Angst (1976 film) =

- Directed by: Oddvar Bull Tuhus
- Written by: Oddvar Bull Tuhus; Lasse Glomm
- Starring: Svein Scharffenberg; Eva Sevaldson
- Release date: 1976
- Running time: 86 minutes
- Country: Norway
- Language: Norwegian

Angst (English: Anguish) is a 1976 Norwegian thriller film directed by Oddvar Bull Tuhus, starring Svein Scharffenberg and Eva Sevaldson. Tove (Sevaldson) is babysitting when she receives a threatening phone call.
