= On His Majesty's Service =

Franking on official documents in Commonwealth countries

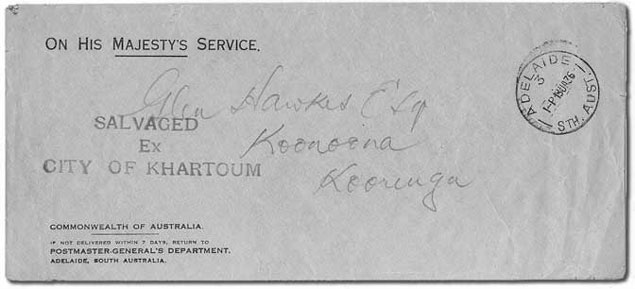
Australian official mail, franked "On His Majesty's Service", crash cover salvaged from the 1935 Imperial Airways City of Khartoum aircraft crash at Alexandria during an England to Australia flight

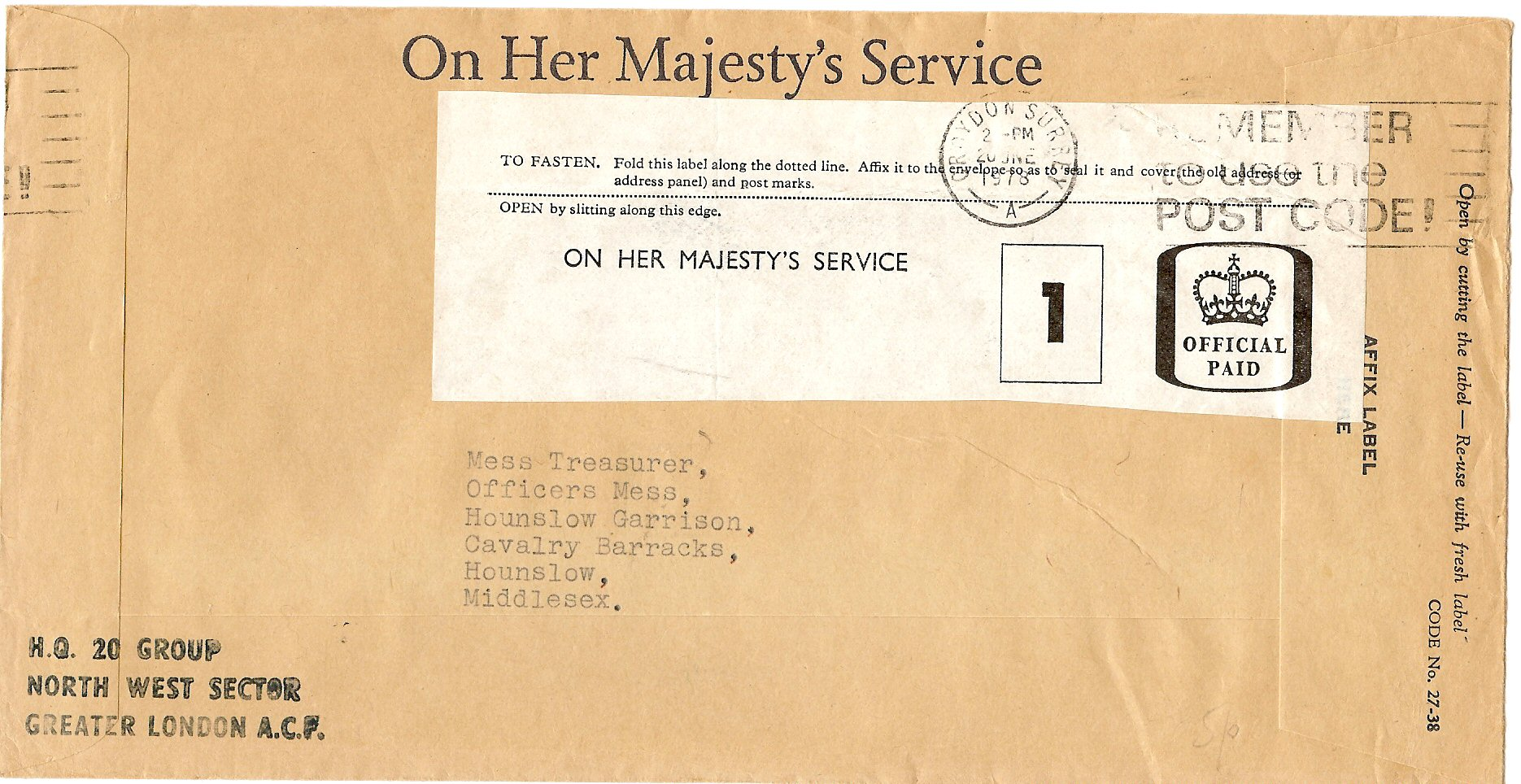
"On Her Majesty's Service" envelope with OHMS economy "Official Paid" label from 1978

On His Majesty's Service or On Her Majesty's Service (depending on the gender of the reigning monarch) was an official franking formerly seen on correspondence from government departments in the United Kingdom, Canada, Australia and other countries that share the same monarch as their head of state (now known as Commonwealth realms).

The expanded form, On His/Her Britannic Majesty's Service has been used for international correspondence, for example for mail to British diplomatic posts in other countries.

In Australia before Federation, letters in envelopes franked with the O.H.M.S. mark were exempt from postal fees.

== In popular culture ==
- O.H.M.S. is a 1937 British action comedy film.
- The title of Ian Fleming's 1963 James Bond novel On Her Majesty's Secret Service, along with its film adaptation, is a play on the phrase.
- On His Majesty's Secret Service is a 2009 Hong Kong action comedy film whose title is a play on the phrase.
- The title of the 2023 James Bond novel, On His Majesty's Secret Service by Charlie Higson, is both a play on the phrase and on the title of the Fleming novel.

== See also ==
- Britannic Majesty for the designation On His Britannic Majesty's Service.
