= Schilthorn =

Mountain summit in Switzerland

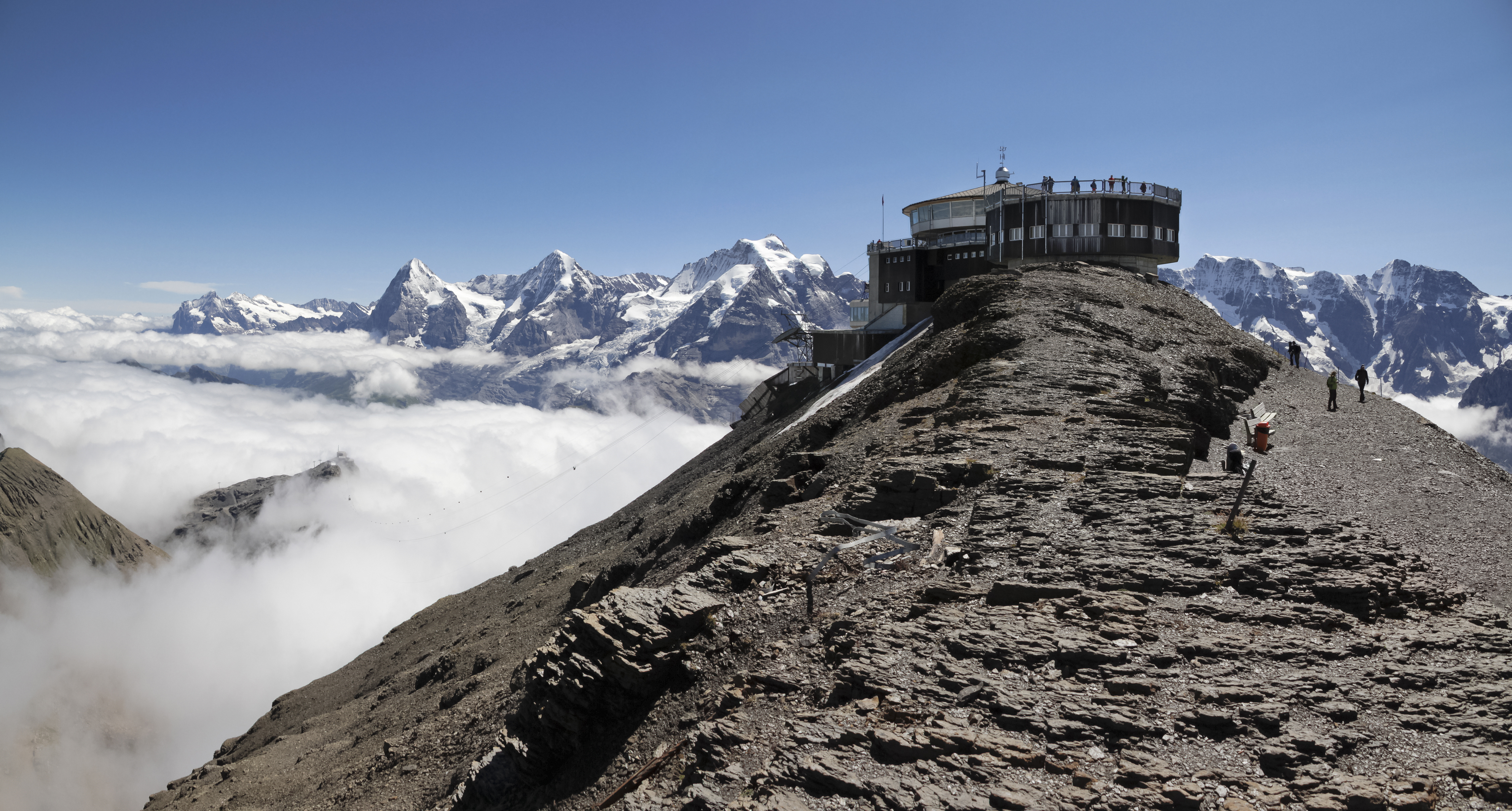
- Schilthorn's summit, with the Piz Gloria restaurant; in the distance are the Eiger, Mönch, and Jungfrau.

Highest point
- Elevation: 2970 m (9744 ft)
- Prominence: 358 m (1175 ft)
- Parent peak: Finsteraarhorn
- Isolation: 3.6 km (2.2 mi)
- Listing: Alpine mountains 2500-2999 m
- Coordinates: 46°33′26″N 7°50′07″E

Geography
- Location within Switzerland
- Location: Bernese Oberland, Switzerland
- Parent range: Bernese Alps

Location in the Alps of Europe

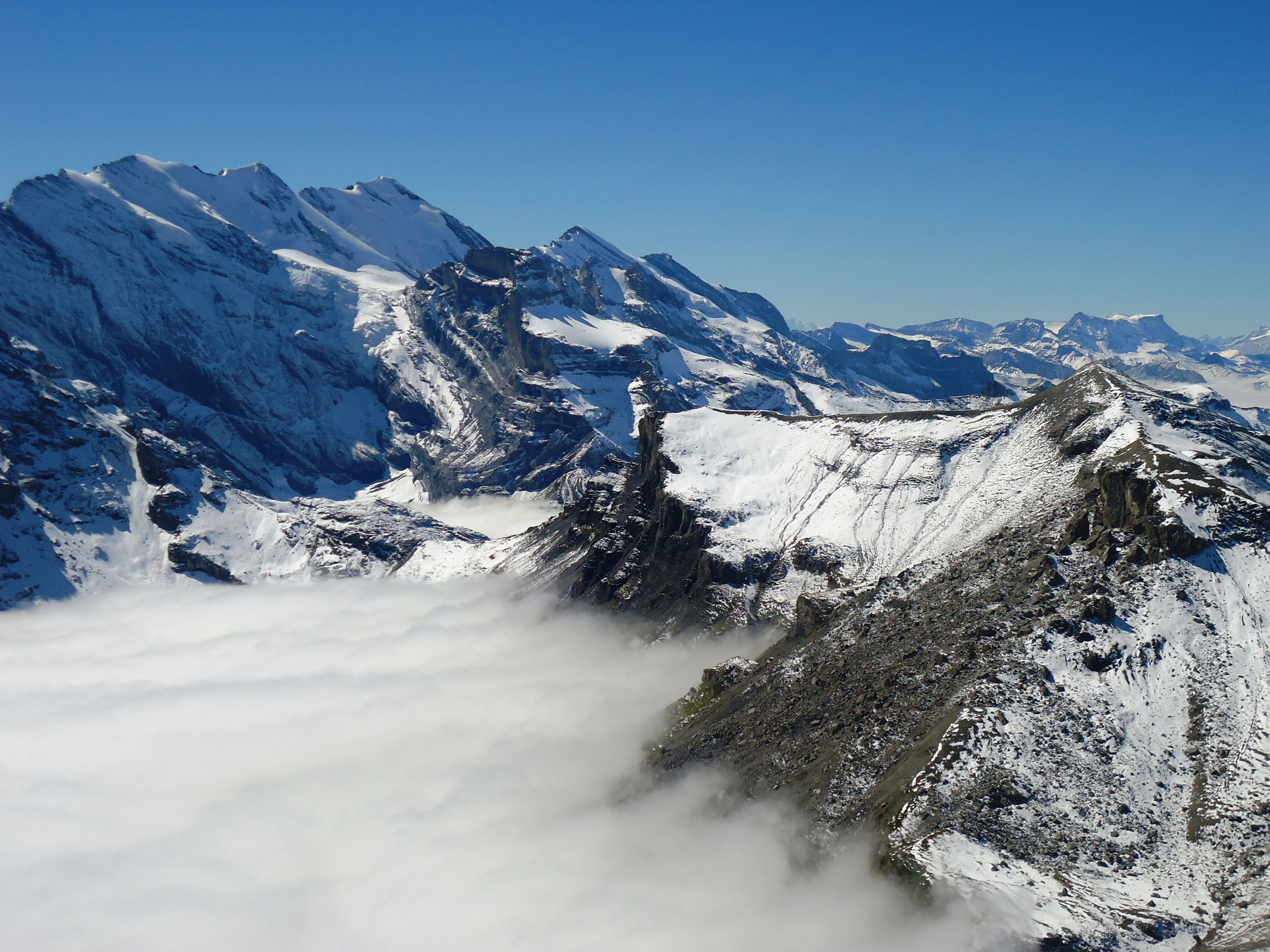
View of Alps from Schilthorn

The Schilthorn is a mountain in the Bernese Alps of Switzerland, Europe. The 2970 m (9744 ft) summit overlooks the valley of Lauterbrunnen in the Bernese Oberland, and is the highest mountain in the range lying north of the Sefinenfurgge Pass. The Schilthorn lies above the village of Mürren, from where a cable car leads to its summit, holding the record of the steepest cable car in the world.

Administratively, the summit is within the municipality of Lauterbrunnen, although the western slopes are within the municipality of Reichenbach im Kandertal. Both municipalities are in the canton of Bern.

The summit has a panoramic view which spans from the Titlis, Jungfrau, Mönch, Eiger, over the Bernese Alps and the Jura Mountains up to the Vosges Mountains and the Black Forest. Mont Blanc is also just visible.

== Access ==
To get to the Schilthorn from the valley floor, a series of cable cars can be taken. The most popular route starts in Stechelberg leaving to Mürren. Mürren can be also reached starting from Stechelberg via Gimmelwald. Another possibility is to take the cable car from Lauterbrunnen, then a train to Mürren.

From Mürren another cable car is taken to Birg, which is the final change before the Schilthorn. This cable airway is the longest and was the most technically challenging airway to be built. The other way up is to take the cable car from Lauterbrunnen to Grütschalp and a train to Mürren, from where the cable car must be taken. Between Birg and the summit, the cable car passes over Grauseeli, a small lake. The cable car reconstruction that began in 2024 is replacing the upper cable car segments between Mürren and Birg and between Birg the Schilthron with new Funifor type cable car tracks. The project will increase capacity between Birg and the Schilthorn to two cars when complete.

It is also possible to hike to the peak, along the myriad of small, but well-marked paths to the top. The hike to the top takes roughly five hours from Gimmelwald for a fit walker.

== Piz Gloria ==
The panoramic revolving restaurant at the summit, Piz Gloria, was featured in the 1969 James Bond movie On Her Majesty's Secret Service. A black ski run featured in the film starts at the summit and leads down to the Engetal below Birg. The restaurant revolves a full 360 degrees in 45 minutes, slightly faster than the minute hand of a clock.

After considering a number of locations, the stalled construction of the sports bar atop the Schilthorn was chosen when the film's producer financed the completion of the famous revolving platform, for the right to use the facility for his next film, the first and only Bond film starring George Lazenby.

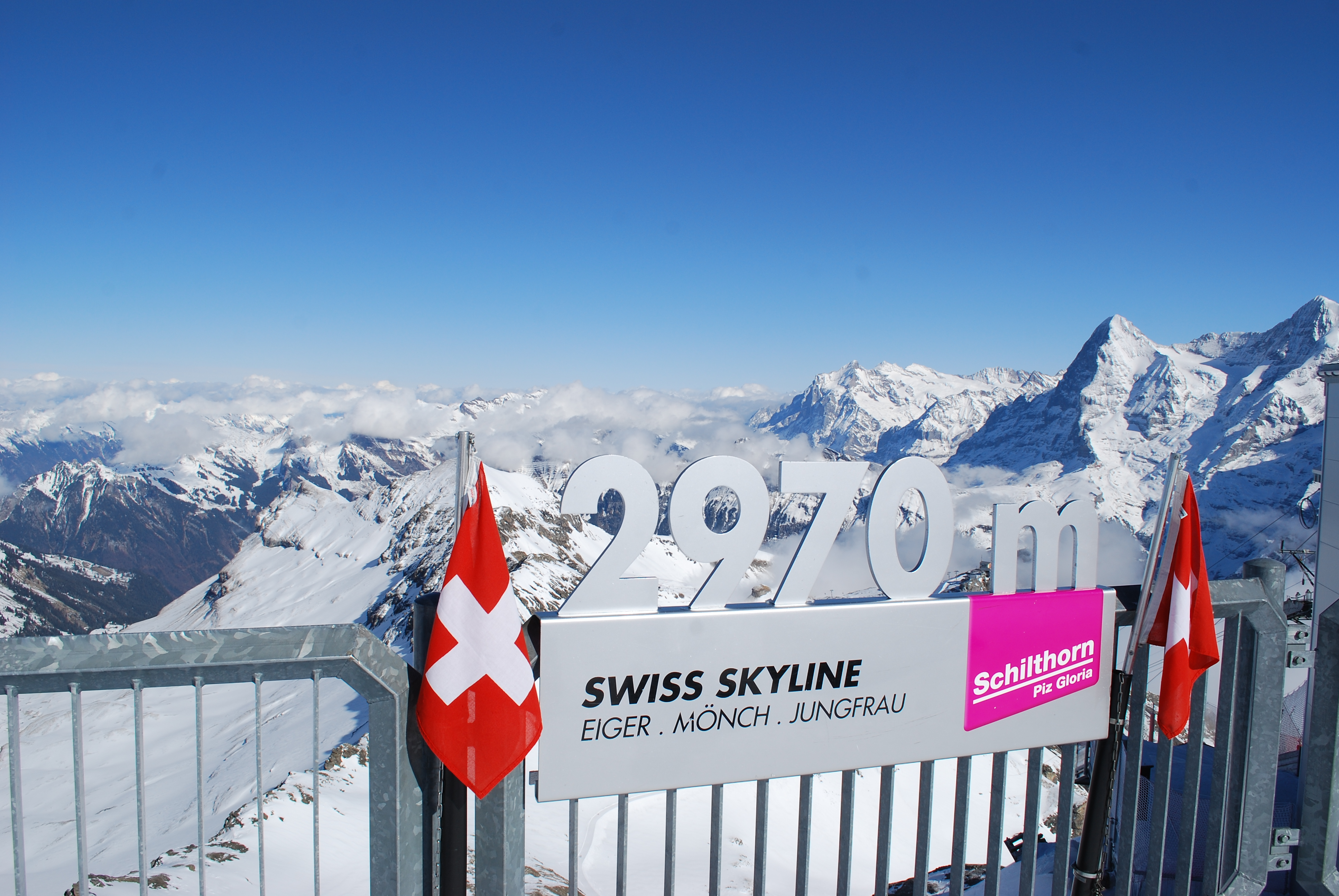
The panoramic view of the mountains Eiger and Monch from the viewing platform at Piz Gloria.

A number of scenes in the film were photographed by cameraman John Jordan hanging below a speeding helicopter. Jordan had previously lost a foot to a helicopter rotor while filming the previous Bond movie You Only Live Twice. Within a year and fitted with a prosthetic limb, Jordan lost his footing and fell 600 m (2000 ft) to his death when filming similar aerial imagery used in the film Catch-22.

== Inferno races ==
During the winter, the Schilthorn is the traditional start for the world's longest downhill ski race, the "Inferno," which started 98 years ago in 1928. It is the largest amateur alpine ski race in the world.

During the summer, the Inferno Triathlon finishes at the summit after a run up from the Lauterbrunnen valley.

== History ==
In 2024 a multi year program to replace the cable car system began. The project included construction of a new cable car directly from Stechelberg to Mürren bypassing Gimmelwald. The new Stechelberg - Mürren segment opened in 2024 and holds the record of the steepest cable car in the world, with a gradient of 159.4%. The original two segment cable car between Stechelberg and Mürren via Gimmelwald will also remain in service to maintain access to the village of Gimmelwald.

== See also ==
- List of mountains of Switzerland accessible by public transport
- Bietenhorn, north-east of Schilthorn
