= Not Now, Darling (film) =

1973 British film by Ray Cooney and David Croft

- Original theatrical release poster
- Directed by: Ray Cooney; David Croft
- Written by: John Chapman; Ray Cooney
- Starring: Leslie Phillips; Ray Cooney; Julie Ege; Bill Fraser; Moira Lister; Derren Nesbitt; Joan Sims; Barbara Windsor; Jack Hulbert; Cicely Courtneidge
- Cinematography: Alan Hume; John Rook
- Edited by: Peter Thornton
- Music by: Cyril Ornadel
- Distributed by: LMG Film Productions; Dimension Pictures
- Release date: March 1973
- Running time: 97 minutes
- Country: United Kingdom
- Language: English

Not Now, Darling is a 1973 British comedy film directed by Ray Cooney and David Croft and starring Trudi Van Doorn, Leslie Phillips and Julie Ege. It was adapted from the 1967 play of the same title by John Chapman and Ray Cooney. The film is a farce centred on a shop in London that sells fur coats. A loosely related sequel Not Now, Comrade was released in 1976.

It was the last film to feature appearances by Cicely Courtneidge and Jack Hulbert who had been a leading celebrity couple in the 1930s and 1940s.

== Plot ==
Gilbert Bodley plans to sell an expensive mink to mobster Harry McMichaell, cheaply, for his wife Janie. Janie is Gilbert's mistress, and Gilbert wants to close the deal. However, instead of doing his own dirty work, he gets his reluctant partner Arnold Crouch to do it for him. Things go awry when Harry plans to buy the same coat for his own mistress, Sue Lawson, and the whole plan fails.

== Cast ==
- Trudi Van Doorn as Miss Whittington
- Leslie Phillips as Gilbert Bodley
- Julie Ege as Janie McMichael
- Joan Sims as Miss Ambrosine Tipdale
- Derren Nesbitt as Harry McMichael
- Ray Cooney as Arnold Crouch
- Bill Fraser as commissionaire
- Jack Hulbert as Commander George Frencham
- Cicely Courtneidge as Mrs Harriet Frencham
- Barbara Windsor as Sue Lawson
- Moira Lister as Maude Bodley
- Jackie Pallo as Mr Lawson
- Peter Butterworth as painter (uncredited)
- Graham Stark as painter (uncredited)

== Critical reception ==
The Monthly Film Bulletin wrote: "Not Now, Darling is one of the first cinema films to employ the Multivista system, which – by electronically linking a number of cameras to screens from which the director can select the image he wants – enables shooting and editing to take place simultaneously. It's a system which ideally suited to the filming of stage performances, a way of breaking up long sequences in confined settings; but in the case of Not Now Darling its advantages (other than economic ones) are hardly apparent. Minimally adapted for the screen from a West End play and with the bulk of its action still set in the furrier's showroom, the film retains the stock ingredients of stage farce: hairbreadth exits and entrances, mistaken identity, characters talking at cross purposes and indulging in prolonged double entendre on such subjects as Barbara Windsor's tits ("You know, birds"). Already weighted down by this level of verbal invention, the flow of the action is further broken by the directors' repetitive habit of employing close-ups for every punchline; and the original sense of accumulating chaos, fostered in part by the monotony of a stalls-eye-view, is here entirely dissipated. Even such experienced comic actors as Leslie Phillips and Joan Sims are unable, in the circumstances, to inject any pace into the proceedings"

The Radio Times Guide to Films gave the film 2/5 stars, writing: "What an appalling waste of a remarkable cast that provides a comic link between the golden age of music hall and the Carry Ons. Popular 1930s husband-and-wife team Jack Hulbert and Cicely Courtneidge were reunited on screen for the first time in 12 years for this clumsy version of Ray Cooney's long-running West End farce. Leslie Phillips holds this threadbare piece together, as the furrier up to his neck in girlfriends and cheap minks, but it's all rather tatty."

British film critic Leslie Halliwell said: "Interminable film version (in Multivista, a shoot-and-edit equivalent to TV taping which gives a dingy look and can only work in a single set) of a West End farce which wasn't marvellous to begin with."
