= Svein Scharffenberg =

Norwegian actor and stage director

- Born: 21 June 1939
- Died: 5 December 2017 (aged 78)

Svein Scharffenberg (21 June 1939 – 5 December 2017) was a Norwegian actor and stage director. He was born in Oslo. He started his acting career at Den Nationale Scene in the season 1967–1968, and was assigned with Nationaltheatret from the next season. He joined Hålogaland Teater from its establishment in 1971. He staged Sukkerbrød med kaviar, written by Leonard Melfi, for Fjernsynsteatret in 1975. He staged the first production at Torshovteatret, Dahl's play Lever du'a Karlsen?, in 1977. Among his film roles is the murderer in Bortreist på ubestemt tid, and he played leading roles in Angst from 1976 and Arme, syndige menneske from 1980. He received the Amanda Award in 2001, for best actor in Norwegian film last year (in the film Når nettene blir lange).
