= Piz Gloria =

Revolving restaurant on the Schilthorn in Switzerland

Coordinates: 46°33′26″N 7°50′7″E

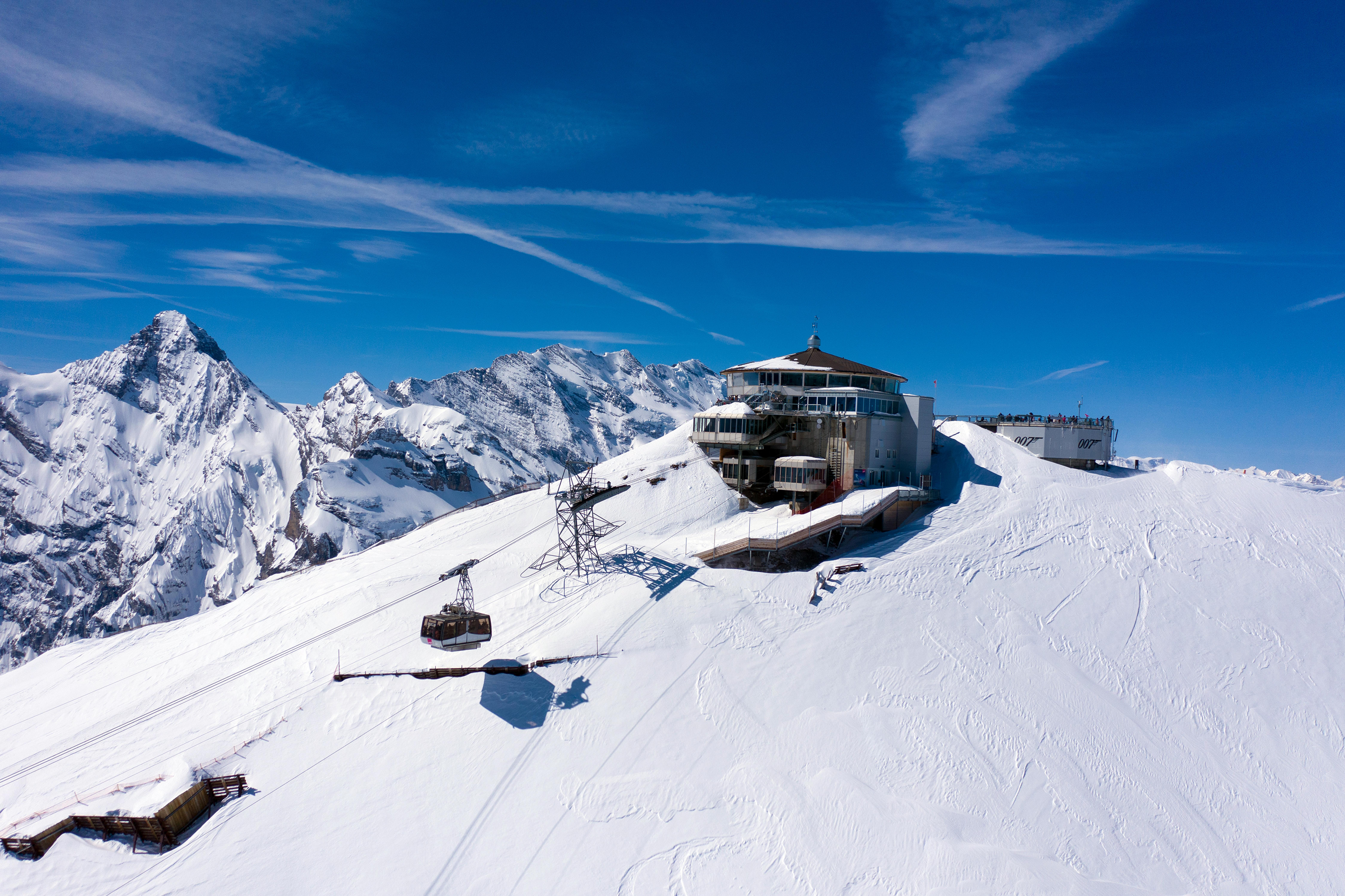
- Piz Gloria in 2020, with Blüemlisalp and Gspaltenhorn visible behind
- Interactive map of the Piz Gloria area

General information
- Type: Revolving restaurant
- Location: Schilthorn, Bernese Oberland, Canton of Bern, Switzerland
- Opened: 1969; 57 years ago
- Renovated: 1990

Height
- Height: 2,970 metres (9,740 ft)

Dimensions
- Diameter: 15 metres (49 ft)

Design and construction
- Architect: Konrad Wolf

Other information
- Seating capacity: 400 diners

Website
- schilthorn.ch

Piz Gloria is a revolving restaurant at the 2,970 m (9,740 ft)-high summit of the Schilthorn near Mürren in the Bernese Oberland, Switzerland.

== Overview ==
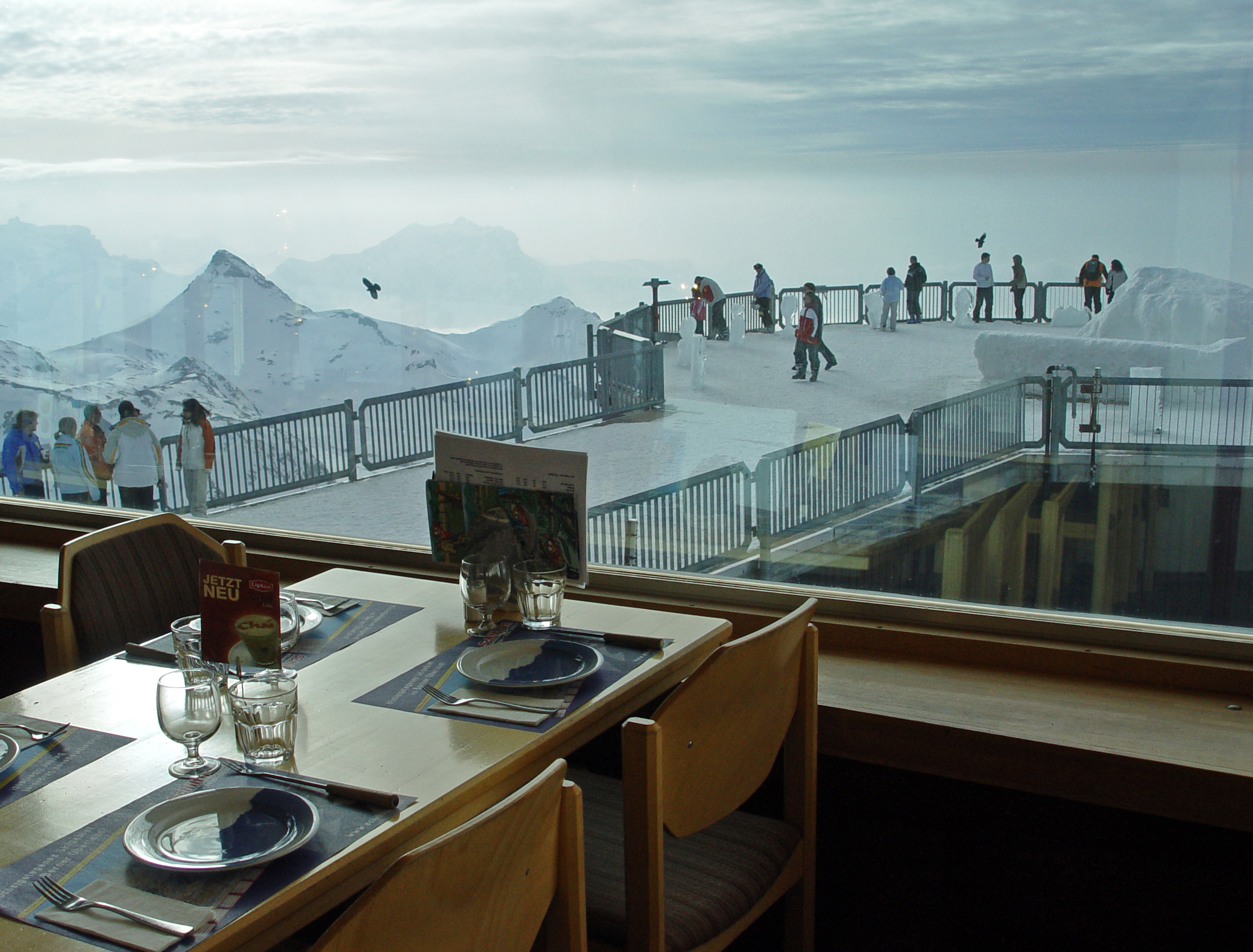
The walkway

The cable car station and the restaurant were designed by Bernese architect Konrad Wolf. The Piz restaurant claims to be the world's first revolving restaurant although others already existed at the time of Piz Gloria's 1969 opening, such as the "Eye of the Needle" in Seattle, Washington, United States, which opened in 1962. Given the difficult topographic and climatic conditions, parts had to be prefabricated. The outer skin of the circular upper floor is of aluminium-clad wooden panels. The roof originally was bare aluminium, but has since been coated. The rotative mechanism — a 12-metre-diameter (39 ft) core with a 3.0-metre (9.8 ft) annulus that completely rotates the upper floor in approximately an hour — allows every guest to have a view in turn. In 1990, the restaurant was enlarged to accommodate some 400 diners, while retaining its original architectural character.

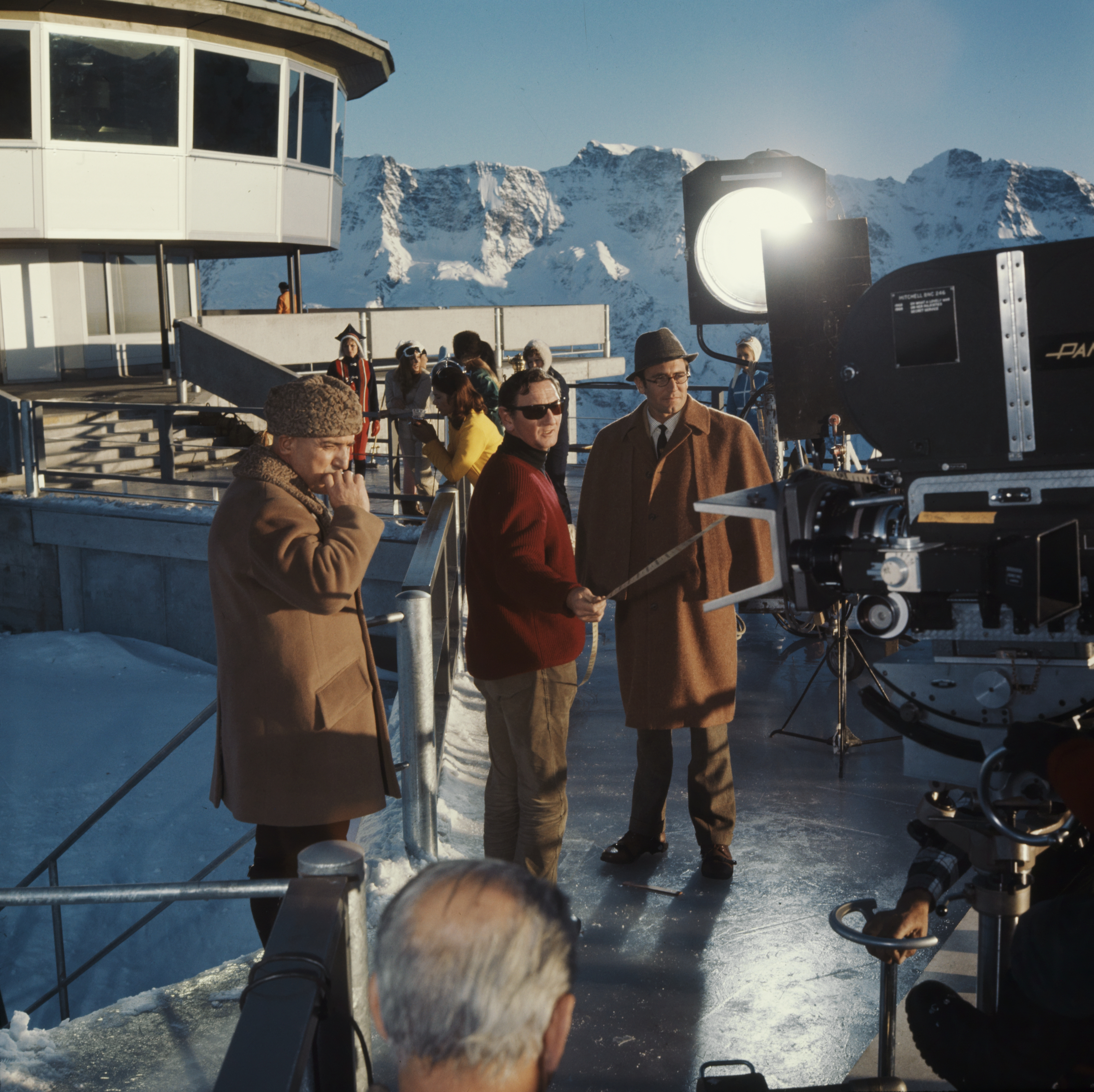
Filming for On Her Majesty's Secret Service at Piz Gloria, 1968

The name Piz Gloria originated in Ian Fleming's James Bond novel On Her Majesty's Secret Service (1963), in which it is the mountain-top hideout of the villain Ernst Stavro Blofeld and contains an allergy clinic. In the story, the location is the Languard range, above Pontresina somewhere in the Engadine near St. Moritz, where Romansh is spoken — piz is a local Romansh term for a mountain peak. However, the real restaurant is located in the Bernese Oberland, where Romansh is not spoken.

The movie production team found the restaurant partly constructed and contributed financially to its completion in return for exclusive use for filming the movie (released in 1969), in which the building has a prominent role.

After filming was completed, the restaurant retained the Piz Gloria name of the film location, and currently acknowledges the film's significant contribution to its commercial reputation; the lower floor houses a James Bond exhibition containing memorabilia and film clips. In July 2015, a new and larger exhibition, called "007 Walk of Fame", was opened. George Lazenby and members of the film crew attended the launch.

== See also ==
- List of restaurants in Switzerland
- List of mountains of Switzerland accessible by public transport
