= On Her Majesty's Secret Service (film) =

1969 James Bond film by Peter R. Hunt

- Theatrical release poster by Robert McGinnis and Frank McCarthy
- Directed by: Peter R. Hunt
- Screenplay by: Richard Maibaum
- Additional dialogue by: Simon Raven
- Based on: On Her Majesty's Secret Service; 1964 novel by Ian Fleming
- Produced by: Harry Saltzman; Albert R. Broccoli
- Starring: George Lazenby; Diana Rigg; Telly Savalas; Bernard Lee; Gabriele Ferzetti; Ilse Steppat
- Cinematography: Michael Reed
- Edited by: John Glen
- Music by: John Barry
- Production company: Eon Productions Limited
- Distributed by: United Artists
- Release dates: 18 December 1969 (London, premiere); 19 December 1969 (United States)
- Running time: 142 minutes
- Countries: United Kingdom; United States
- Language: English
- Budget: $7 million
- Box office: $82 million

On Her Majesty's Secret Service is a 1969 epic spy film and the sixth in the James Bond series produced by Eon Productions. It is based on the 1963 novel by Ian Fleming, whose title is a derivative of the term "On Her Majesty's Service". Following Sean Connery's decision to retire from the role after You Only Live Twice, Eon selected George Lazenby, a model with no prior acting credits, to play the part of James Bond. During filming, Lazenby announced that he would play the role of Bond only once. Connery returned to portray Bond in 1971's Diamonds Are Forever.

In the film, Bond faces Blofeld (Telly Savalas), who is planning to hold the world to ransom by threatening to render all food plants and livestock infertile through the actions of a group of brainwashed "angels of death". Along the way Bond meets, falls in love with, and eventually marries Contessa Teresa di Vicenzo (Diana Rigg).

The film marked the directorial debut of Peter R. Hunt, who had served as a film editor and second unit director on previous films in the series: it would be his only Bond film as director. Hunt, along with producers Albert R. Broccoli and Harry Saltzman, decided to produce a more realistic film that would follow the novel closely. It was shot in Switzerland, England, and Portugal from October 1968 to May 1969. Although its cinema release was not as lucrative as its predecessor You Only Live Twice, On Her Majesty's Secret Service was still one of the top-performing films of the year. Critical reviews upon release were mixed, but the film's reputation has improved greatly over time and it is now regarded as one of the strongest entries in the series as well as one of the most faithful adaptations of a Fleming novel.

== Plot ==
James Bond saves a woman on the beach from an attempted suicide by drowning, and later meets her again in a casino. The woman, Contessa Teresa "Tracy" di Vicenzo, invites Bond to her hotel room to thank him, but when he arrives he is attacked by an unidentified man. After subduing him, Bond returns to his own room and finds Tracy there; she claims that she was unaware of the attacker's presence. The next morning, Bond is kidnapped by several men, including the one he fought, who take him to meet Marc-Ange Draco, the head of the European crime syndicate Unione Corse. Draco reveals that Tracy is his only daughter and tells Bond of her troubled past, offering him one million pounds if he will marry her. Bond refuses, but agrees to continue romancing Tracy if Draco helps him track down Ernst Stavro Blofeld, the head of SPECTRE.

Upon returning to London, M relieves Bond of his mission to assassinate Blofeld. Furious, Bond dictates a letter of resignation to Moneypenny, which she alters into a request for a leave of absence. Bond heads for Draco's birthday party in Portugal. There, he and Tracy begin a whirlwind romance, and Draco directs him to Gebrüder Gumbold, a law firm in Bern, Switzerland. Bond breaks into the office of Blofeld's lawyer and learns that Blofeld is corresponding with London College of Arms genealogist Sir Hilary Bray, attempting to claim the title Count Balthazar de Bleuchamp.

Posing as Bray, Bond goes to meet Blofeld, who has established a clinical allergy research institute atop Piz Gloria in the Swiss Alps. Bond meets twelve young women, later referred to by Blofeld as his "angels of death", who are patients at the institute's clinic, apparently cured of various allergies. After dinner, Bond goes to the room of one patient, Ruby, who wrote her room number on his bare leg. At midnight, while still with Ruby, Bond discovers that the women go into a sleep-induced hypnotic state while Blofeld implants subliminal audio instructions. In fact, they are being brainwashed to distribute bacteriological warfare agents throughout the world.

Bond tries to trick Blofeld into leaving Switzerland so that MI6 can arrest him without violating Swiss sovereignty. Blofeld refuses and Bond is eventually caught by henchwoman Irma Bunt. Blofeld reveals that he identified Bond due to an error regarding the Bleuchamp estate, and has him imprisoned after revealing that he has killed his colleague Shaun Campbell. Bond eventually makes his escape by skiing down from Piz Gloria while Blofeld and his men give chase. Simultaneously, the "angels of death" depart Piz Gloria, escorted by Bunt. Tracy finds Bond in the village of Lauterbrunnen and helps him escape in her car. Pursued by Bunt and her men, they drive into a stock-car race to shake them off. A blizzard forces them off the road and they shelter in a remote barn. Bond professes his love to Tracy and proposes marriage to her, which she happily accepts. The next morning, they set off on skis but Blofeld and his men find them and give chase. Blofeld sets off an avalanche that sweeps over Bond and Tracy. Tracy is captured, while Bond is buried but later escapes.

Back in London at M's office, Bond is informed that Blofeld intends to hold the world to ransom by threatening to destroy its agriculture using his brainwashed women. Blofeld demands amnesty for all past crimes and to be recognised as the current Count de Bleuchamp. M tells 007 that the ransom will be paid and forbids him to mount a rescue mission. Bond instead enlists Draco and his forces to attack Blofeld's headquarters, while also rescuing Tracy from Blofeld's captivity. The facility is destroyed, and Blofeld escapes the destruction alone in a bobsleigh, with Bond pursuing him. The chase ends when Blofeld is trapped in a collision with the branch of a tree.

Bond and Tracy marry in Portugal, then drive away in Bond's Aston Martin DBS decorated with flowers. When Bond pulls over to the roadside to remove them, Blofeld and Bunt drive past and machine-gun their car. Tracy is killed and Bond cradles her dead body.

== Cast ==
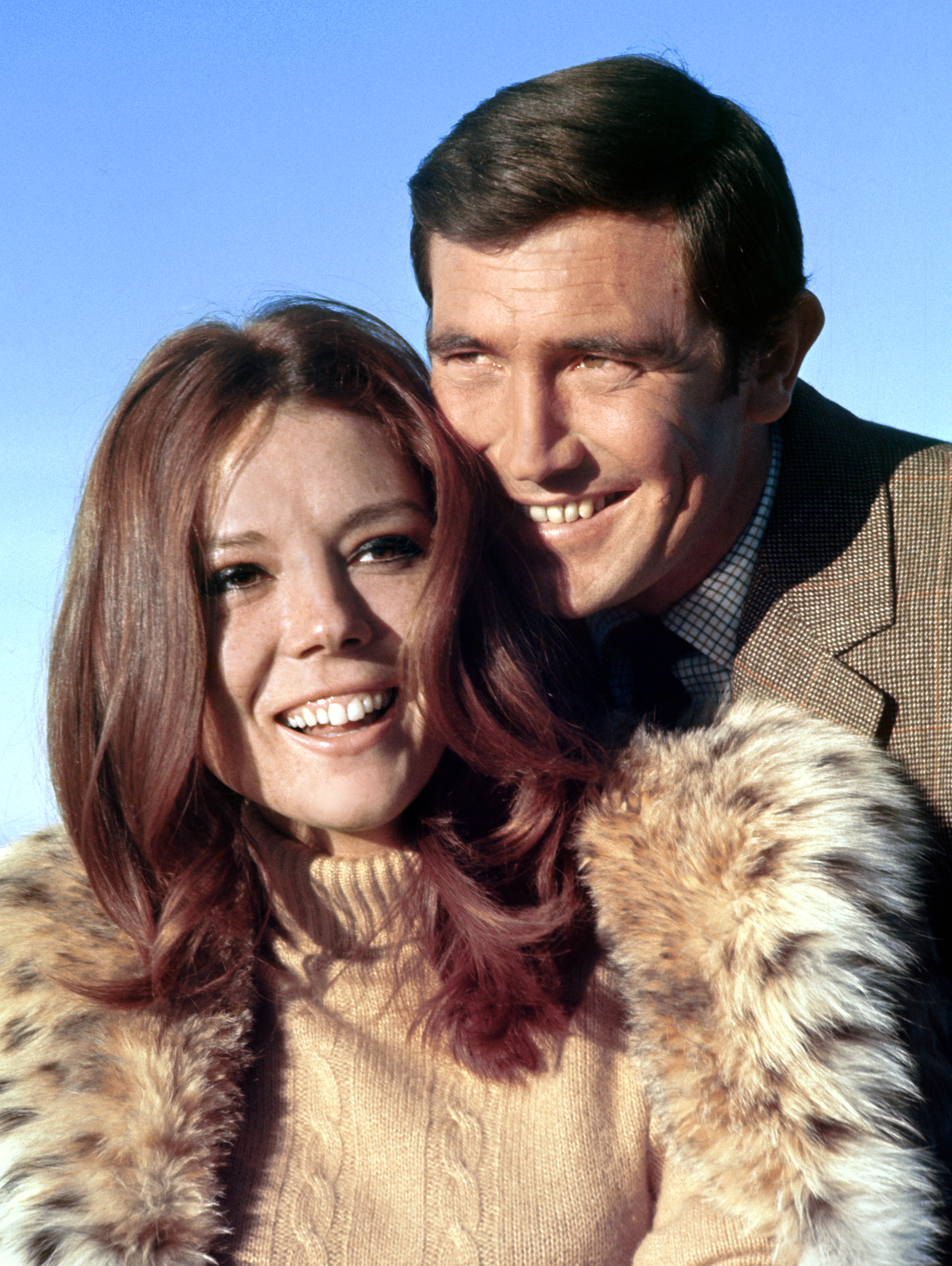
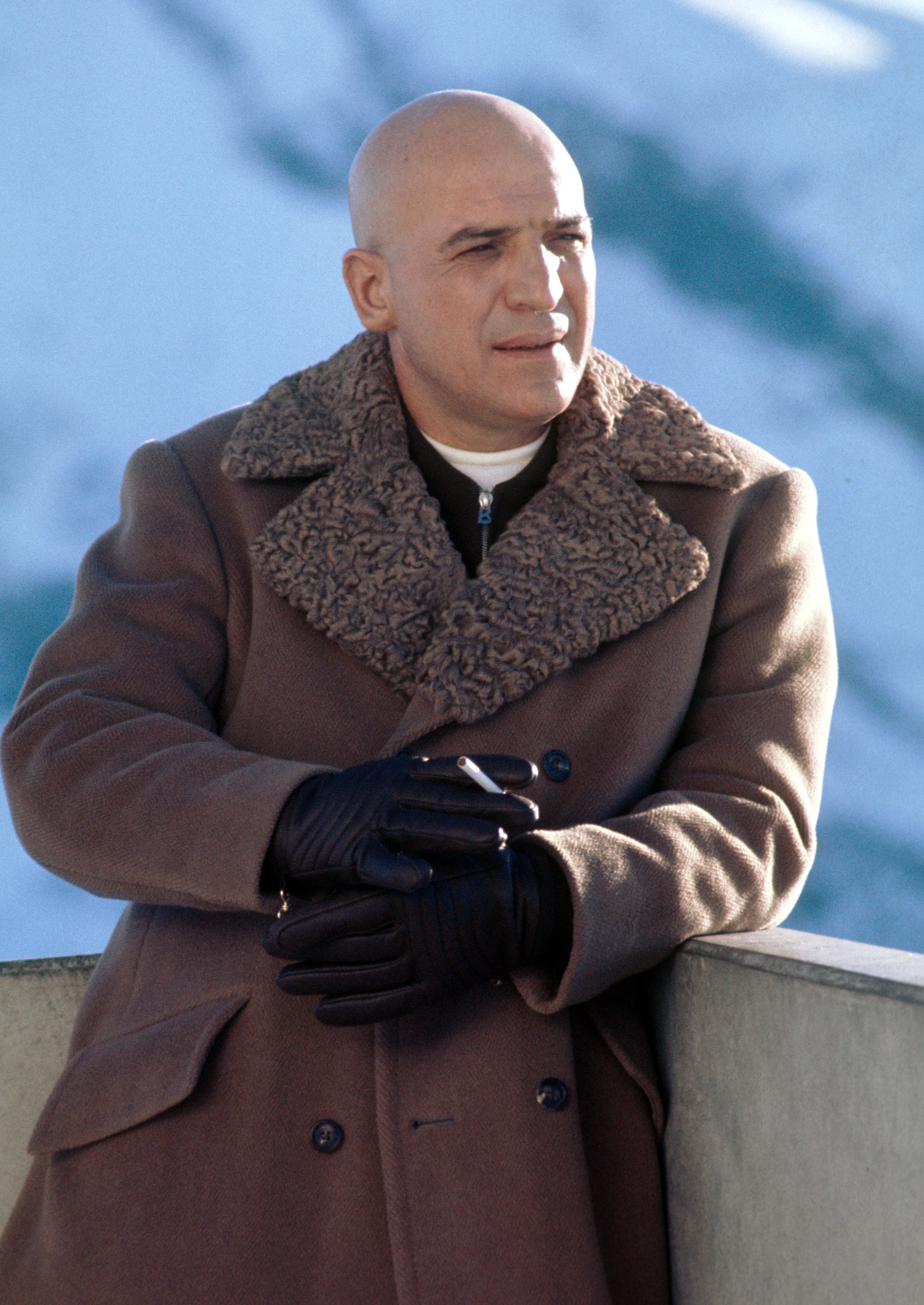
Diana Rigg, George Lazenby and Telly Savalas on set of the film
- George Lazenby as James Bond, MI6 agent 007.
- Diana Rigg as Countess Tracy di Vicenzo, Marc-Ange Draco's daughter.
- Telly Savalas as Ernst Stavro Blofeld, leader of SPECTRE.
- Gabriele Ferzetti as Marc-Ange Draco, Head of the Unione Corse, and Tracy's father. David de Keyser provided the English dubbing.
- Ilse Steppat as Irma Bunt, Blofeld's henchwoman.
- Lois Maxwell as Miss Moneypenny, M's secretary.
- George Baker as Sir Hilary Bray, Herald in the London College of Arms. When Bond impersonates Bray, Baker dubs Bond's voice.
- Bernard Lee as M, Head of the British Secret Service.
- Bernard Horsfall as Shaun Campbell, 007's colleague.
- Desmond Llewelyn as Q, Head of MI6's technical department.
- Yuri Borienko as Grunther, chief of security at Piz Gloria.
- Virginia North as Olympe, Draco's lover. Nikki van der Zyl provided the uncredited voice for Olympe.
- Geoffrey Cheshire as Toussaint, one of Draco's thugs.
- Irvin Allen as Che Che, Tracy's bodyguard.
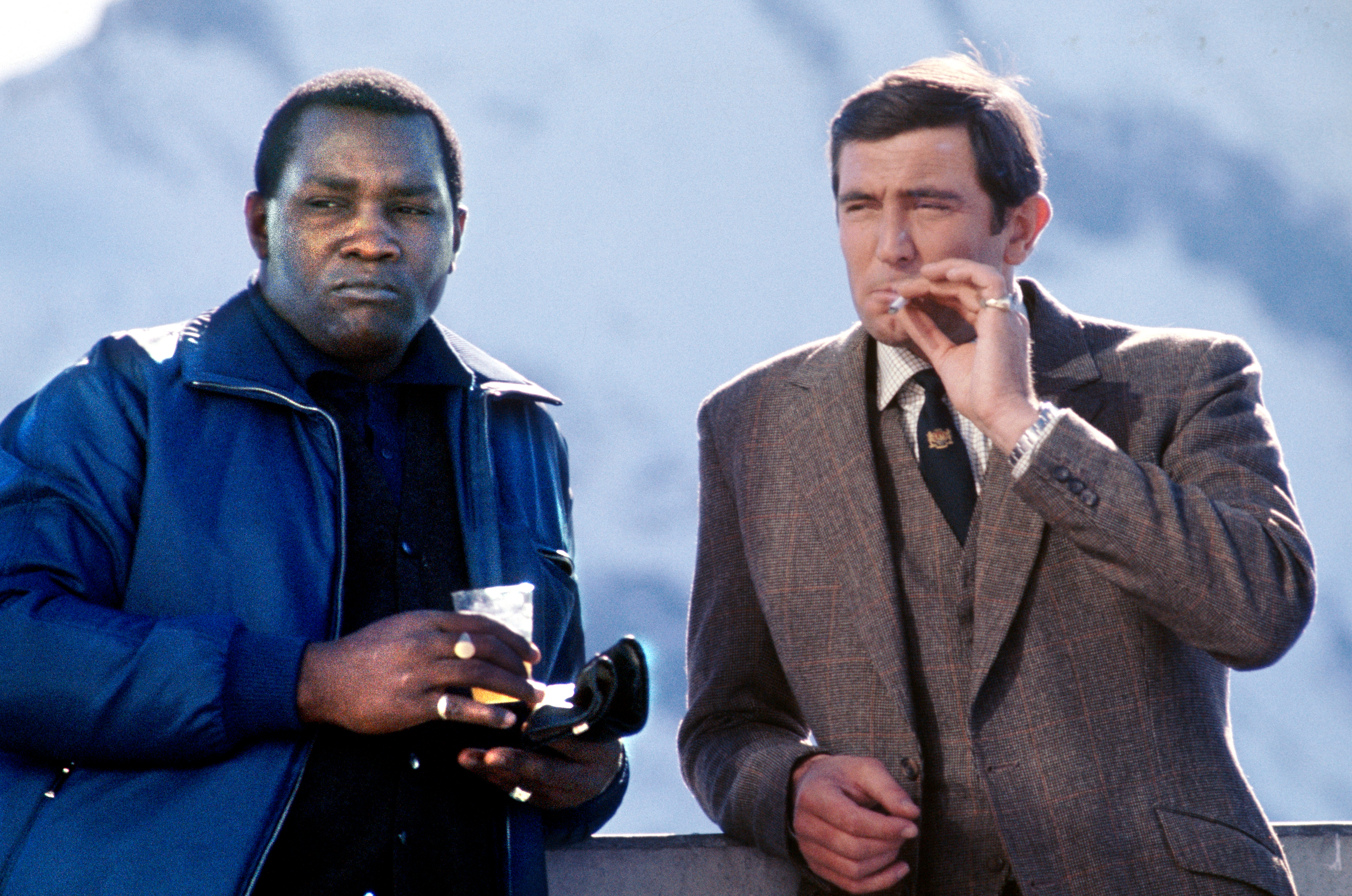
  Irvin Allen and George Lazenby
- Terry Mountain as Raphael.
- James Bree as Gumbold.
- John Gay as Hammond.
- Brian Worth as Manuel (uncredited).
- Bessie Love as Baccarat Player (uncredited).

=== Blofeld's Angels of Death ===
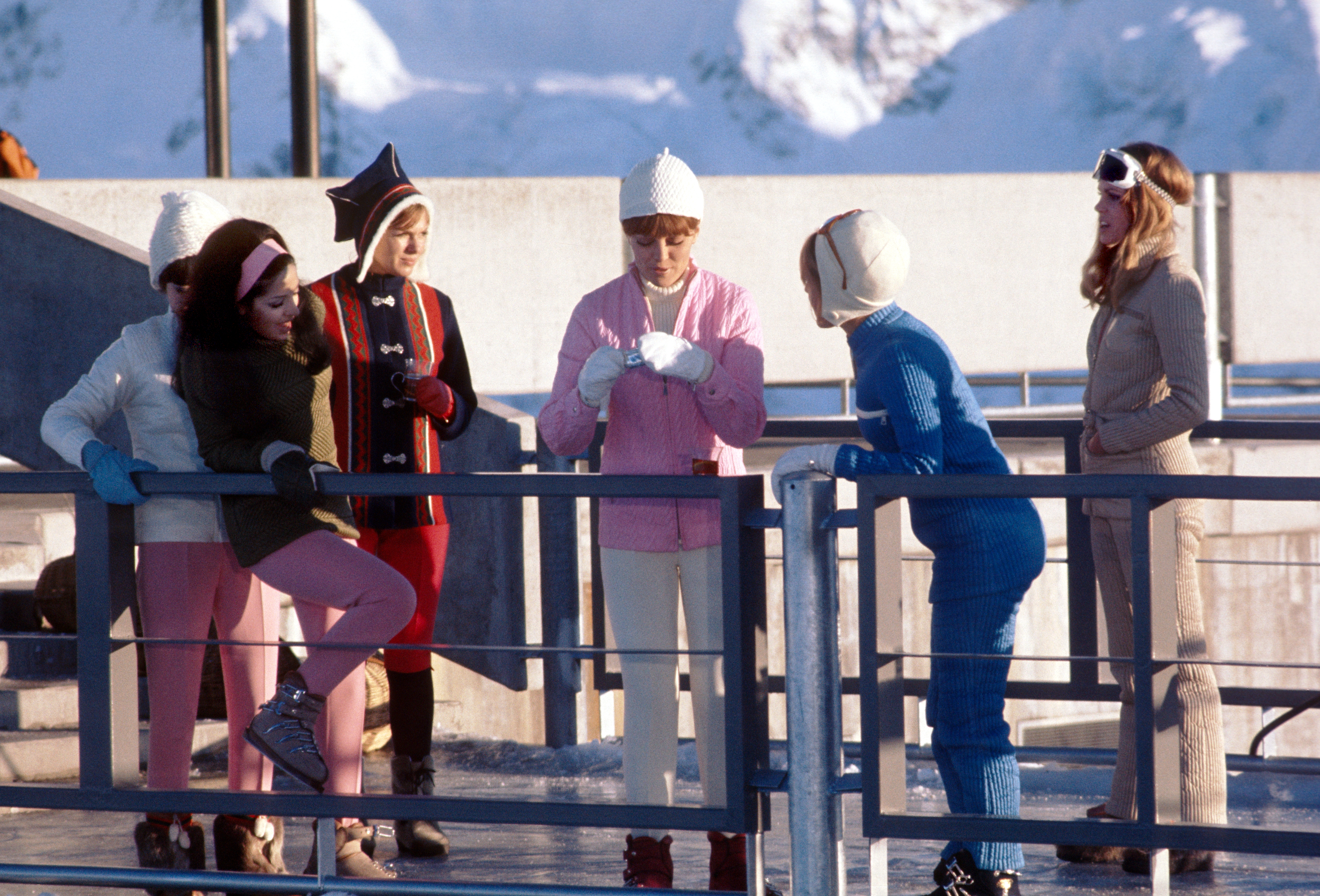
Some of the "Angels of Death" at Piz Gloria during principal photography. From left to right: Mona Chong, Zaheera, Julie Ege, Jenny Hanley, Anouska Hempel, Joanna Lumley.

The angels of death are 12 women from all over the world being brainwashed by Blofeld under the guise of allergy or phobia treatment to spread the Virus Omega. Their unwitting mission is to help Blofeld contaminate and ultimately sterilise the world's food supply.

- Angela Scoular as Ruby Bartlett, an English girl at the clinic suffering from an allergy to chickens, whom Bond seduces. Scoular also played Buttercup in the 1967 Bond comedy Casino Royale.
- Anouska Hempel as an Australian girl
- Catherina von Schell as Nancy, a Hungarian girl at the clinic whom Bond also beds
- Dani Sheridan as an American.
- Helena Ronee as an Israeli.
- Ingrid Back as a German.
- Jenny Hanley as an Irish woman.
- Joanna Lumley as an Englishwoman.
- Julie Ege as Helen, a Scandinavian.
- Mona Chong as a Chinese woman.
- Sylvana Henriques as a Jamaican.
- Zaheera (credited as Zara) as an Indian.

== Production ==
The novel On Her Majesty's Secret Service was first published after the film series started and contains "a gentle dig at the cinematic Bond's gadgets". Broccoli and Saltzman had originally intended to make On Her Majesty's Secret Service after Goldfinger, and Richard Maibaum worked on a script at that time. Thunderball was filmed instead, after the ongoing rights dispute over the novel was settled between Fleming and Kevin McClory. On Her Majesty's Secret Service was due to follow that, but problems with a warm Swiss winter and inadequate snow cover led to Saltzman and Broccoli postponing the film again, favouring production of You Only Live Twice.

Between the resignation of Sean Connery at the beginning of filming You Only Live Twice and its release, Saltzman had planned to adapt The Man with the Golden Gun in Cambodia and use Roger Moore as the next Bond, but political instability meant the location was ruled out and Moore signed up for another series of The Saint. After You Only Live Twice was released in 1967, the producers once again picked up with On Her Majesty's Secret Service.

Peter Hunt, who had worked on the five preceding films, had impressed Broccoli and Saltzman enough to earn his directorial debut as they believed his quick cutting had set the style for the series. It was also the result of a long-standing promise from Broccoli and Saltzman for a directorial position, which they honored after Lewis Gilbert declined to direct. Hunt also asked for the position during the production of Chitty Chitty Bang Bang, and he brought along with him many crew members, including cinematographer Michael Reed. Hunt was focused on making his mark – "I wanted it to be different than any other Bond film would be. It was my film, not anyone else's." On Her Majesty's Secret Service was the last film in the series on which Hunt worked.

=== Writing ===
Screenwriter Richard Maibaum, who had worked on all the previous Bond films except for You Only Live Twice, was responsible for On Her Majesty's Secret Service's script. Saltzman and Broccoli decided to drop the science fiction gadgets from the earlier films and focus more on plot, as in From Russia with Love. Peter Hunt asked Simon Raven to write some of the dialogue between Tracy and Blofeld in Piz Gloria, which was to be "sharper, better and more intellectual"; one of Raven's additions was having Tracy quoting James Elroy Flecker. When writing the script, the producers decided to make the closest adaptation of the book possible: virtually everything in the novel occurs in the film and Hunt was reported to always enter the set carrying an annotated copy of the novel.

With the script following the novel more closely than the other film adaptations of the eponymous source novels, there are several continuity errors due to the films taking place in a different sequence, such as Blofeld not recognising Bond, despite having met him face-to-face in the previous film You Only Live Twice. In the original script, Bond undergoes plastic surgery to disguise him from his enemies; the intention was to allow an unrecognisable Bond to infiltrate Blofeld's hideout and help the audience accept the new actor in the role. However, this was dropped in favour of ignoring the change in actor.

To make audiences not forget it was the same James Bond, just played by another actor, the producers inserted many references to the previous films, some as in-jokes. These include Bond breaking the fourth wall by stating "This never happened to the other fellow"; the credits sequence with images from the previous instalments; Bond visiting his office and finding objects from Dr. No, From Russia with Love, and Thunderball; and a caretaker whistling the theme from Goldfinger. Maibaum later said he thought "Lazenby was not ideal for the part" but that "it was a marvellous script."

=== Casting ===
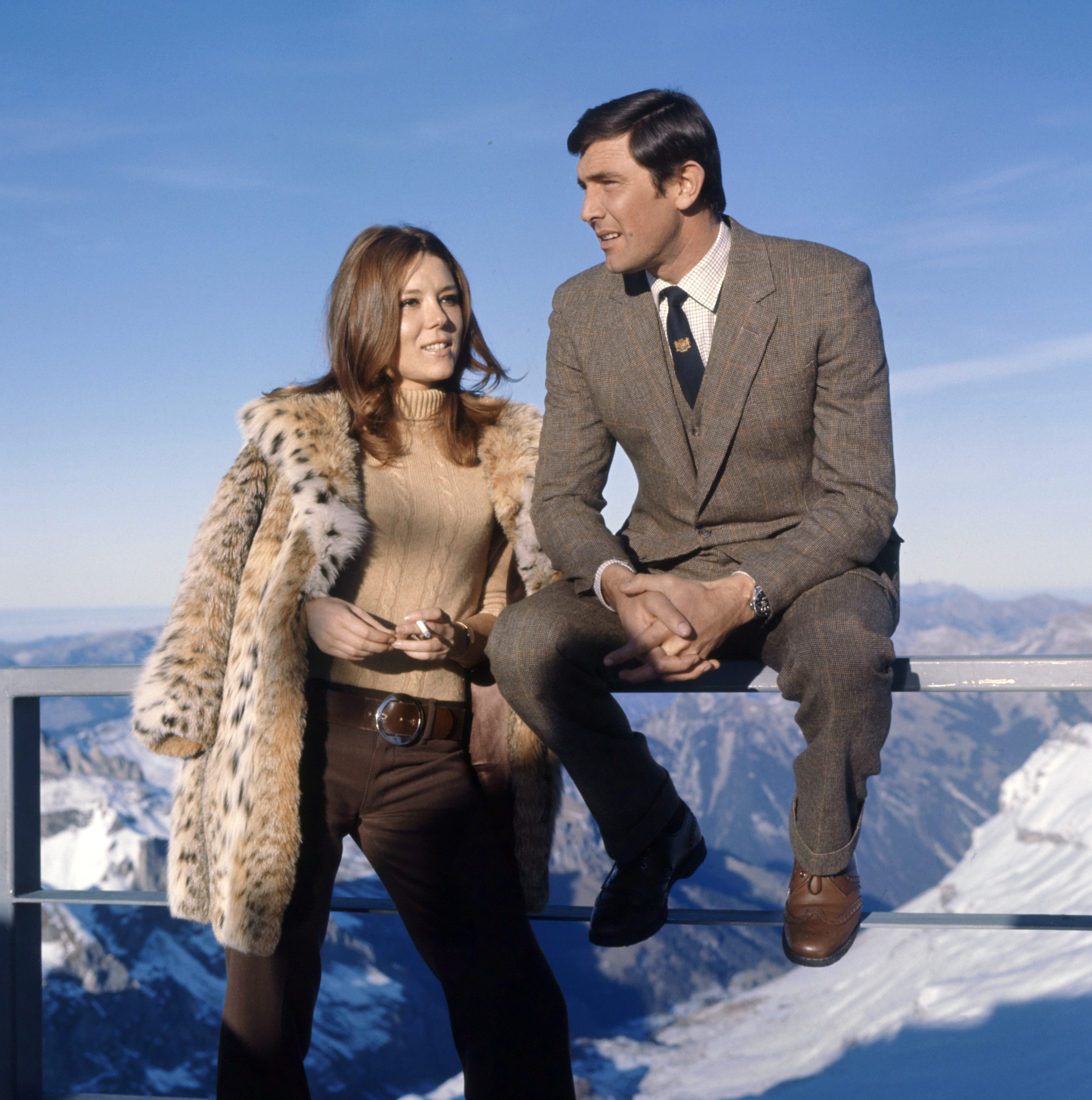
Diana Rigg and George Lazenby on set

In 1967, after five films, Sean Connery resigned from the role of James Bond and was not on speaking terms with Albert Broccoli during the filming of You Only Live Twice. Over 400 actors, Peter Purves, Michael Caine and including many of the most famous performers in the Commonwealth, were considered for the role of James Bond. The confirmed frontrunners were Englishman John Richardson, Dutchman Hans De Vries, Australian Robert Campbell, Scotsman Anthony Rogers, Greek Giorgos Fountas, and Australian George Lazenby. Broccoli also met with Terence Stamp about playing the part.

Broccoli was interested in rising star Oliver Reed but decided his public image was already too distinct. Broccoli and Hunt eventually chose Lazenby after seeing him in a Fry's Chocolate Cream advertisement. Lazenby dressed the part by sporting several sartorial Bond elements such as a Rolex Submariner wristwatch and a Savile Row suit (ordered for, but uncollected by, Connery), and going to Connery's barber at the Dorchester Hotel. Broccoli noticed Lazenby as a Bond-type man based on his physique and character elements, and offered him an audition. The position was consolidated when Lazenby accidentally punched a professional wrestler, who was acting as stunt coordinator, in the face, impressing Broccoli with his ability to display aggression. Lazenby was offered a contract for seven films; however, he was convinced by his agent Ronan O'Rahilly that the secret agent would be archaic in the liberated 1970s, and as a result he left the series after the release of On Her Majesty's Secret Service in 1969.

For Tracy Draco, the producers wanted an established actress opposite neophyte Lazenby. Brigitte Bardot was invited, but after she signed to appear in Shalako opposite Sean Connery, the deal fell through, and Diana Rigg—who had already been the popular heroine Emma Peel in The Avengers—was cast instead. Rigg said one of the reasons for accepting the role was that she always wanted to be in an epic film. Hunt and Maibaum admired Donald Pleasence's performance as Blofeld in You Only Live Twice but wanted to recast the character. Maibaum originally wrote the role of Blofeld with Max von Sydow in mind; coincidentally, von Sydow later played Blofeld in the non-Eon Bond film Never Say Never Again. Telly Savalas was ultimately cast following a suggestion from Broccoli. Hunt's neighbour George Baker was offered the part of Sir Hilary Bray. Baker's voice was also used when Lazenby was impersonating Bray, as Hunt considered Lazenby's imitation not convincing enough. Gabriele Ferzetti was cast as Draco after the producers saw him in We Still Kill the Old Way, but Ferzetti's heavy Italian accent also led to his voice being redubbed by English actor David de Keyser for the final cut.

=== Filming ===
James Bond's Europe in On Her Majesty's Secret Service

Principal photography began in the Canton of Bern, Switzerland, on 21 October 1968, with the first scene shot being an aerial view of Bond ascending the stairs of Blofeld's mountain clinic to meet the patients. The scenes were shot at the revolving restaurant Piz Gloria, located atop the Schilthorn near the village of Mürren. The location was found by production manager Hubert Fröhlich after three weeks of location scouting in France and Switzerland. The restaurant was still under construction, but the producers found the location visually interesting for film-making, and agreed to finance the provision of electricity and the aerial lift to make filming there possible.

The first ski chase scene in the Alps was shot on various ski runs around the Schilthorn and Wengen and the second one on the Sulegg, as well as Winterburg Hill, Heiligenschwendi. The Christmas festival was filmed in Grindelwald, and Bond's spy mission in a lawyer's office was shot in Bern. Production was hampered by weak snowfall which was unfavourable to the skiing action scenes. The producers even considered moving to another location in Switzerland, but it was taken by the production of Downhill Racer. The Swiss filming ended up running 56 days over schedule. In March 1969, production moved to England, with London's Pinewood Studios being used for interior scenes, including those set at Piz Gloria, and M's house being shot in Marlow, Buckinghamshire. In April, the filmmakers went to Portugal, where principal photography wrapped in May.

The pre-credit coastal and hotel scenes were filmed at Hotel Estoril Palacio in Estoril and Guincho Beach, Cascais, while Lisbon was used for the reunion of Bond and Tracy, and the ending employed a mountain road in the Arrábida National Park near Setúbal. Harry Saltzman wanted these scenes to be in France, but after searching there, Peter Hunt considered that not only were the locations not photogenic, but were already "overexposed".

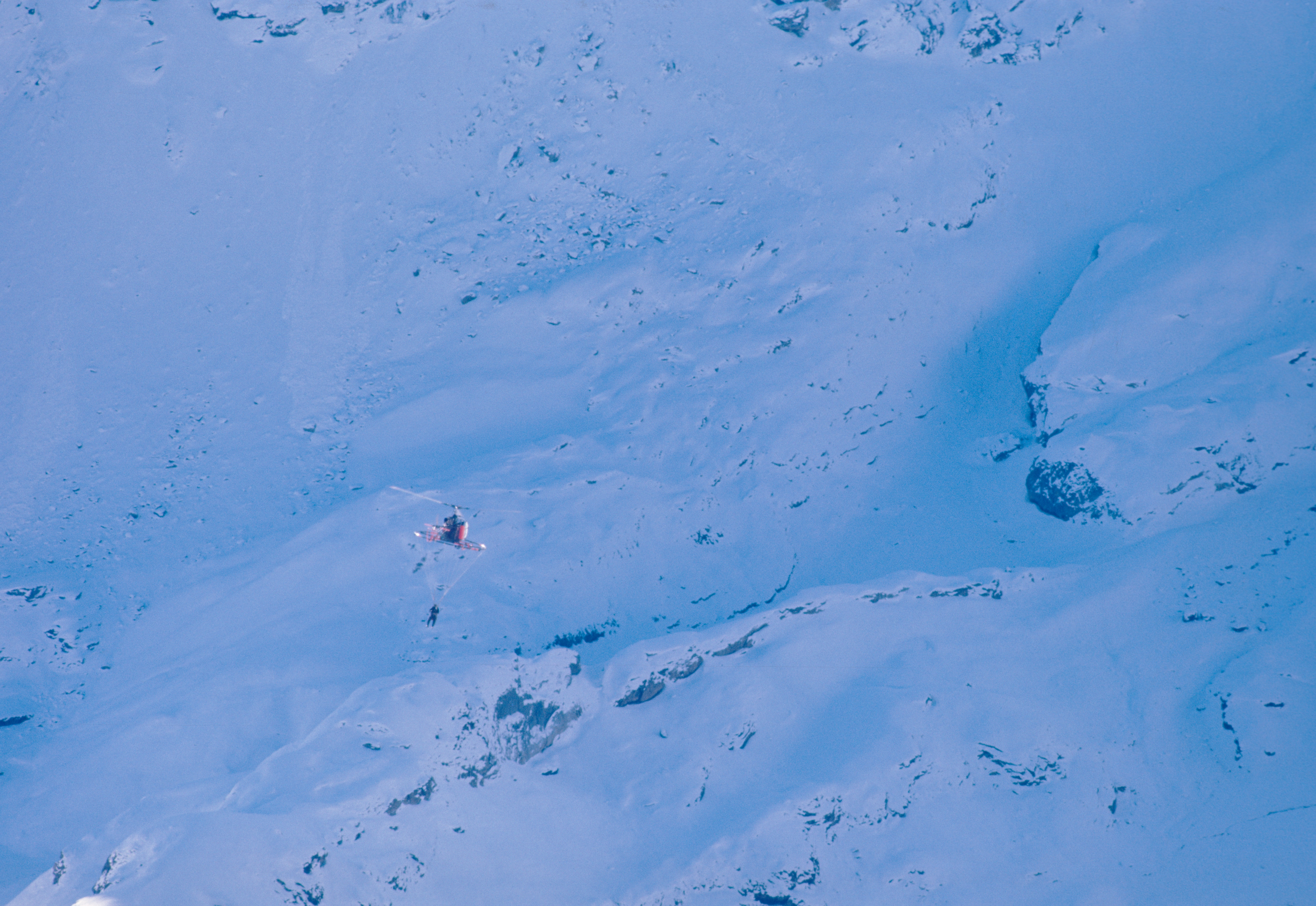
Cameraman Johnny Jordan dangling from a helicopter

While the first unit shot at Piz Gloria, the second unit, led by John Glen, started filming the ski chases. The downhill skiing involved professional skiers, and various camera tricks. Some cameras were handheld, with the operators holding them as they were going downhill with the stuntmen, and others were aerial, with cameramen Johnny Jordan – who had previously worked in the helicopter battle of You Only Live Twice — developing a system where he was dangled by an 18 feet (5.5 m) long parachute harness rig below a helicopter, allowing scenes to be shot on the move from any angle. The bobsledding chase was also filmed with the help of Swiss Olympic athletes, and was rewritten to incorporate the accidents the stuntmen suffered during shooting, such as the scene where Bond falls from the sled. Blofeld getting snared with a tree was performed at the studio by Savalas himself, after the attempt to do this by the stuntman on location came out wrong. Heinz Lau and Robert Zimmermann served as the stunt doubles for Bond and Blofeld during the bobsleigh scene. Glen was also the editor of the film, employing a style similar to the one used by Hunt in the previous Bond films, with fast motion in the action scenes and exaggerated sound effects.

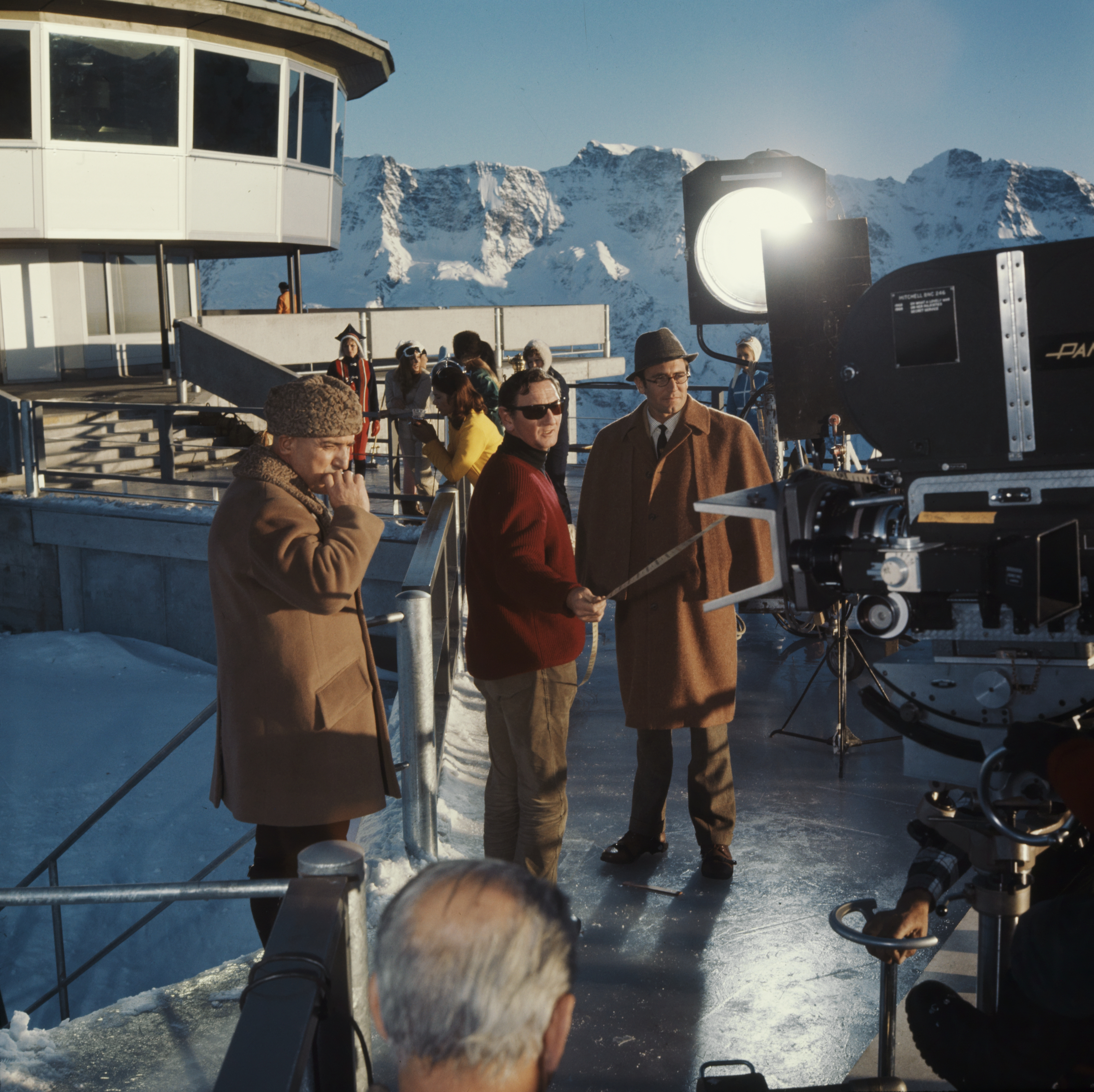
Filming at Piz Gloria, Switzerland

The avalanche scenes were due to be filmed in co-operation with the Swiss army, which annually used explosions to prevent snow build-up by causing avalanches, but the area chosen naturally avalanched just before filming. The final result was a combination of a man-made avalanche at an isolated Swiss location shot by the second unit, stock footage, and images created by the special effects crew with salt. The stuntmen were filmed later, added by optical effects. For the scene in which Bond and Tracy crash into a stock car race while being pursued, an ice rink was constructed over an unused aeroplane track, with water and snow sprayed on it constantly. Lazenby and Rigg did most of the driving due to the high number of close-ups.

For the cinematography, Hunt aimed for a "simple, but glamorous style like the 1950s Hollywood films I grew up with", as well as something realistic, "where the sets don't look like sets". Cinematographer Michael Reed added he had difficulties with lighting, as every set built for the film had a ceiling, preventing spotlights from being hung from above. While shooting, Hunt wanted "the most interesting framings possible", which would also look good after being cropped for television.

On Her Majesty's Secret Service was the longest Bond film until Casino Royale was released in 2006. Even so, two scenes were deleted from the final print: Irma Bunt spying on Bond as he buys a wedding ring for Tracy, and a chase over London rooftops and into the Royal Mail underground rail system after Bond's conversation with Sir Hilary Bray was overheard.

==== Lazenby's difficulties ====
Lazenby said he experienced difficulties during shooting, not receiving any coaching despite his lack of acting experience, and with director Hunt never addressing him directly, only through his assistant. Lazenby claimed that Hunt also asked the rest of the crew to keep a distance from him, as "Peter thought the more I was alone, the better I would be as James Bond." Allegedly, there also were personality conflicts with Rigg, who was already an established star. According to Hunt, these rumours were untrue and there were no such difficulties—or else they were minor—and may have started with Rigg joking to Lazenby before filming a love scene, "Hey George, I'm having garlic for lunch. I hope you are!" According to Diana Rigg's diary, as related in her daughter's biography, "George’s behaviour on and off set was that of a spoilt child". Lazenby gave a four page interview to the Sunday Express complaining about the production, saying that Rigg had sabotaged a love scene by eating garlic beforehand. In response Rigg published an open letter in the Daily Sketch rebuking Lazenby for his treatment of the crew and cast. Lazenby further responded to her with an article titled "The biggest row in showbusiness". Surprisingly, Lazenby later turned up at Rigg's house in Ibiza with his girlfriend and they enjoyed a lunch together.

Hunt also declared that he usually had long talks with Lazenby before and during shooting. For instance, to shoot Tracy's death scene, Hunt brought Lazenby to the set at 8 o'clock in the morning and made him rehearse all day long, "and I broke him down until he was absolutely exhausted, and by the time we shot it at five o'clock, he was exhausted, and that's how I got the performance." Hunt said that if Lazenby had remained in the role, he would also have directed the successor film, Diamonds Are Forever, and that his original intention had been to conclude the film with Bond and Tracy driving off following their wedding, saving Tracy's murder for the pre-credit sequence of Diamonds Are Forever. The idea was discarded after Lazenby quit the role.

=== Music ===
The soundtrack for On Her Majesty's Secret Service has been called "perhaps the best score of the series." It was composed, arranged and conducted by John Barry; it was his sixth successive Bond film. Barry opted to use more electronic instruments and a more aggressive sound in the music – "I have to stick my oar in the musical area double strong to make the audience try and forget they don't have Sean ... to be Bondian beyond Bondian."

Barry felt it would be difficult to compose a theme song containing the title "On Her Majesty's Secret Service" unless it were written operatically, in the style of Gilbert and Sullivan. Leslie Bricusse had considered lyrics for the title song but director Peter R. Hunt allowed an instrumental title theme in the tradition of the first two Bond films. The theme is built around an Andalusian cadence, which establishes the story as a tragedy. Barry's composition was described as "one of the best title cuts, a wordless Moog-driven monster, suitable for skiing at breakneck speed or dancing with equal abandon".

Barry also composed the love song "We Have All the Time in the World", with lyrics by Burt Bacharach's regular lyricist Hal David, sung by Louis Armstrong. It is heard during the Bond–Tracy courtship montage, bridging Draco's birthday party in Portugal and Bond's burglary of the Gebrüder Gumbold law office in Bern, Switzerland. Barry recalled Armstrong was very ill, but recorded the song in one take. Armstrong did, however, make some further recordings in 1970 and 1971. The song was re-released in 1994, achieving the number three position during a 13-week spell in the UK charts. The song was reused for a second Bond movie, when it was used as the soundtrack for the closing credits for the 2021 film No Time to Die.

Barry and David also wrote two other songs for the film, both performed by Danish singer Nina van Pallandt. One, entitled "Do You Know How Christmas Trees Are Grown?", was featured in the film in several scenes. The other, "The More Things Change", was recorded by Nina at the same session but did not end up in the finished film. Instead, it appeared as the B-side of the UK single of "Do You Know How Christmas Trees Are Grown?" and an instrumental version of it appeared on John Barry's 1970 LP Ready When You Are J.B..

The theme, "On Her Majesty's Secret Service", is used in the film as an action theme alternative to Monty Norman's "James Bond Theme", as with Barry's previous "007" themes. "On Her Majesty's Secret Service" was covered in 1997 by the British big beat group the Propellerheads for the Shaken and Stirred album. Barry's orchestrator Nic Raine recorded an arrangement of the escape from Piz Gloria sequence and it was featured as a theme in the trailers for the 2004 Pixar animated film directed by Brad Bird, The Incredibles. Barry was the first choice to do the score for The Incredibles. However, he declined to do the score, as he did not wish to duplicate the sound of his older work.

== Release and reception ==
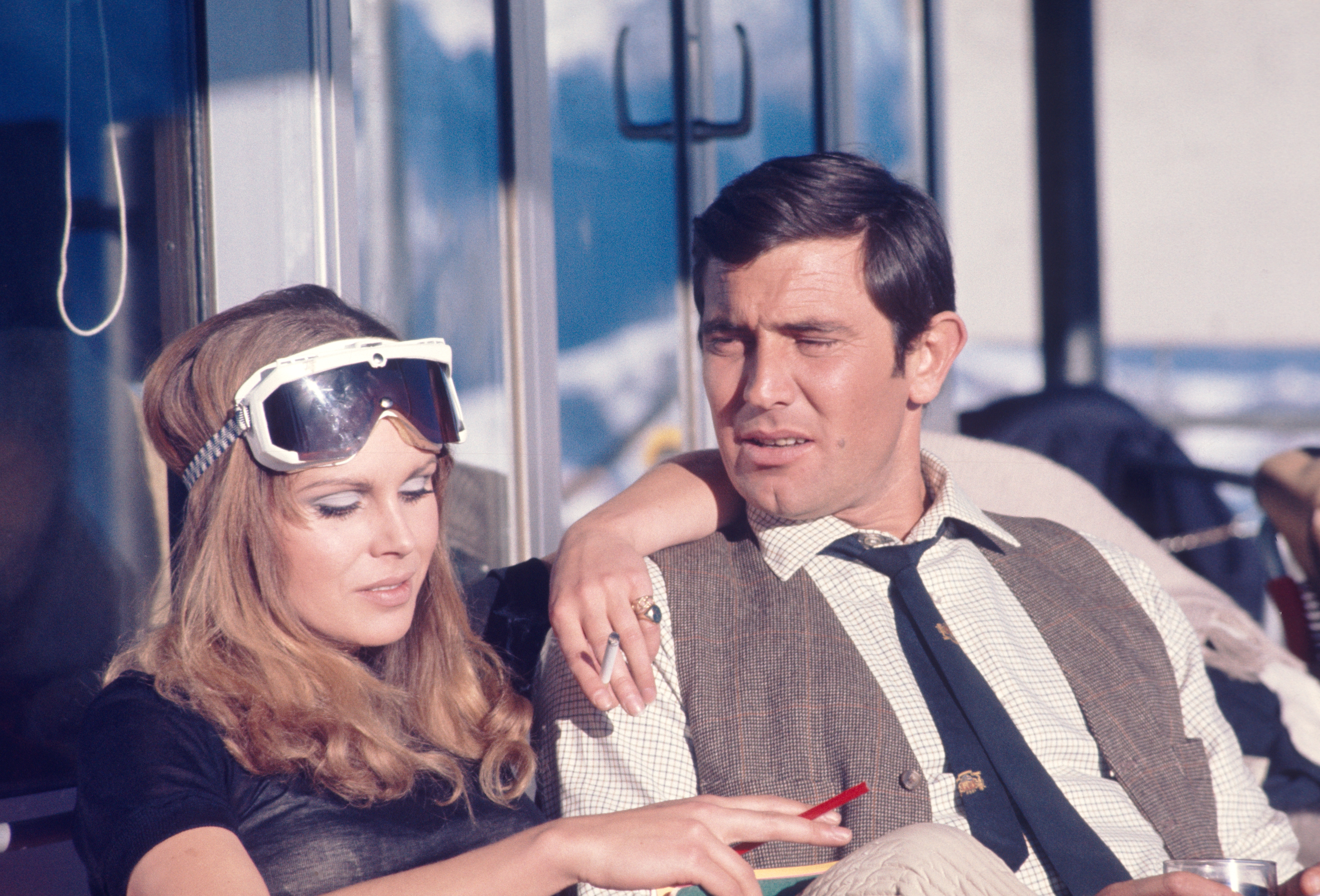
Joanna Lumley and George Lazenby

On Her Majesty's Secret Service was released on 18 December 1969 with its premiere at the Odeon Leicester Square in London. The avalanche sequence in the film had been recorded in stereo and the Odeon installed a new speaker system to highlight the effect.

Lazenby appeared at the premiere with a beard, looking "very un-Bond-like", according to the Daily Mirror. Lazenby claimed the producers had tried to persuade him to shave it off to appear like Bond, but by then he had already decided not to make another Bond film and rejected the idea. The beard and accompanying shoulder-length hair "strained his already fragile relationship with Saltzman and Broccoli".

Because Lazenby had informed the producers that On Her Majesty's Secret Service was to be his only outing as Bond and because of the lack of gadgets used by Bond in the film, few items of merchandise were produced for the film, apart from the soundtrack album and a film edition of the book. Those that were produced included a number of Corgi Toys, including Tracey's Mercury Cougar (1969), Campbell's Volkswagen and two versions of the bobsleigh—one with the 007 logo and one with the Piz Gloria logo. On Her Majesty's Secret Service was nominated for only one award: George Lazenby was nominated in the New Star of the Year – Actor category at the 1970 Golden Globe Award ceremony, losing out to Jon Voight.

=== Box office ===
The film topped the United States box office when it opened with a gross of $1.2 million for the week. It was the highest-grossing film in January 1970. The film closed its box-office run with £750,000 in the United Kingdom (the highest-grossing film of the year), $64.6 million worldwide, half of You Only Live Twice's total gross, but still one of the highest-grossing films of 1969. It was one of the most popular movies in France in 1969, with admissions of 1,958,172. Nonetheless, this was a considerable drop from You Only Live Twice. After re-releases, the total box office was $82,000,000 worldwide.

=== Contemporary reviews ===
The majority of reviews were critical of either the film, Lazenby, or both, while most of the contemporary reviews in the British press referred to George Lazenby at some point as "The Big Fry", a reference to his previous acting in Fry's chocolate advertisements. Derek Malcolm of The Guardian was dismissive of Lazenby's performance, saying that he "is not a good actor and though I never thought Sean Connery was all that stylish either, there are moments when one yearns for a little of his louche panache." For all the criticism of Lazenby, however, Malcolm says that the film was "quite a jolly frolic in the familiar money-spinning fashion". Tom Milne, writing in The Observer was even more scathing, saying that "I ... fervently trust (OHMSS) will be the last of the James Bond films. All the pleasing oddities and eccentricities and gadgets of the earlier films have somehow been lost, leaving a routine trail through which the new James Bond strides without noticeable signs of animation."

Donald Zec in the Daily Mirror was equally damning of Lazenby's acting abilities, comparing him unfavourably to Connery: "He looks uncomfortably in the part like a size four foot in a size ten gumboot." In yet another unfavourable comparison of Lazenby to Connery, Gene Siskel of the Chicago Tribune remarked that he "doesn't fill Sean Connery's shoes, Aston-Martin, or stretch pants. The new 007 is more boyish and consequently less of a man. He doesn't order food with the same verve, and generally lacks the self-satisfied smirk that Connery kept with him and transmitted to his audience." A. H. Weiler of The New York Times also weighed in against Lazenby, saying that "Lazenby, if not a spurious Bond, is merely a casual, pleasant, satisfactory replacement." Canby also included the movie in his list of “ten worst films of 1969” for the New York Times: “Lazenby….seems ill-at-ease in his beautifully tailored suits, and never manages to suggest—even for fun‚ that the script’s terrible, single-entendre one-liners might have a perfectly innocent second meaning. The thing that ruins the film, however, is Diana Rigg, who is such a beautiful, intelligent, responsive, mysterious actress that her presence makes everything around her look even more dull and foolish than is absolutely necessary.”

Zec was kinder to Lazenby's co-star, saying that "there is style to Diana Rigg's performance and I suspect that the last scene which draws something of a performance out of Lazenby owes much to her silken expertise." Siskel also wrote that Rigg "is well-cast as the girl, but we lose her for about an hour in the film, only to have her return in a most implausible location and time."

One of the few supporters of Lazenby amongst the critics was Alexander Walker in the London Evening Standard who said that "The truth is that George Lazenby is almost as good a James Bond as the man referred to in his film as 'the other fellow'. Lazenby's voice is more suave than sexy-sinister and he could pass for the other fellow's twin on the shady side of the casino. Bond is now definitely all set for the Seventies." Judith Crist of New York also found the actor to be a strong point of the movie, stating that "This time around there's less suavity and a no-nonsense muscularity and maleness to the role via the handsome Mr. Lazenby".

The feminist film critic Molly Haskell also wrote an approving review of the film in The Village Voice: "In a world, an industry, and particularly a genre which values the new and improved product above all, it is nothing short of miraculous to see a movie which dares to go backward, a technological artefact which has nobly deteriorated into a human being. I speak of the new and obsolete James Bond, played by a man named George Lazenby, who seems more comfortable in a wet tuxedo than a dry martini, more at ease as a donnish genealogist than reading (or playing) Playboy, and who actually dares to think that one woman who is his equal is better than a thousand part-time playmates." Haskell was also affected by the film's emotional ending: "The love between Bond and his Tracy begins as a payment and ends as a sacrament. After ostensibly getting rid of the bad guys, they are married. They drive off to a shocking, stunning ending. Their love, being too real, is killed by the conventions it defied. But they win the final victory by calling, unexpectedly, upon feeling. Some of the audience hissed, I was shattered. If you like your Bonds with happy endings, don't go."

=== Retrospective reviews ===
Modern reception of the film has seen a strong positive reversal, to the point that many Bond connoisseurs have ranked it as their personal favourite, including multiple Academy Award winners and participants in a magazine fan poll.

Film critic James Berardinelli summarized in his review: "with the exception of one production aspect, [it] is by far the best entry of the long-running James Bond series. The film contains some of the most exhilarating action sequences ever to reach the screen, a touching love story, and a nice subplot that has agent 007 crossing (and even threatening to resign from) Her Majesty's Secret Service." Julia Sirmons, writing in CrimeReads, also regarded it as the best Bond film, highlighting its mix of romance, the strong Bond girl, its cheekiness, and Lazenby.

American film reviewer Leonard Maltin has suggested that if it had been Connery in the leading role, On Her Majesty's Secret Service would have epitomised the series. On the other hand, Danny Peary wrote, "I'm not sure I agree with those who insist that if Connery had played Bond it would definitely be the best of the entire Bond series ... Connery's Bond, with his boundless humor and sense of fun and self-confidence, would be out of place in this picture. It actually works better with Lazenby because he is incapable of playing Bond as a bigger-than-life hero; for one thing he hasn't the looks ... Lazenby's Bond also hasn't the assurance of Connery's Bond, and that is appropriate in the crumbling, depressing world he finds himself. He seems vulnerable and jittery at times. At the skating rink, he is actually scared. We worry about him ... On Her Majesty's Secret Service doesn't have Connery and it's impossible to ever fully adjust to Lazenby, but I think that it still might be the best Bond film, as many Bond cultists claim." Peary also described On Her Majesty's Secret Service as "the most serious", "the most cynical" and "the most tragic" of the Bond films.

Brian Fairbanks differed in his opinion of Lazenby, saying that the film "gives us a James Bond capable of vulnerability, a man who can show fear and is not immune to heartbreak. Lazenby is that man, and his performance is superb." Fairbanks also thought On Her Majesty's Secret Service to be "not only the best Bond, it is also the last truly great film in the series. In fact, had the decision been made to end the series, this would have been the perfect final chapter."

American filmmaker Steven Soderbergh wrote: "For me there's no question that cinematically On Her Majesty's Secret Service is the best Bond film and the only one worth watching repeatedly for reasons other than pure entertainment ... Shot to shot, this movie is beautiful in a way none of the other Bond films are". Christopher Nolan has also stated that On Her Majesty's Secret Service was his favourite Bond film, and in describing its influence on his own film Inception (2010), Nolan said: "What I liked about it that we've tried to emulate in this film is there's a tremendous balance in that movie of action and scale and romanticism and tragedy and emotion."

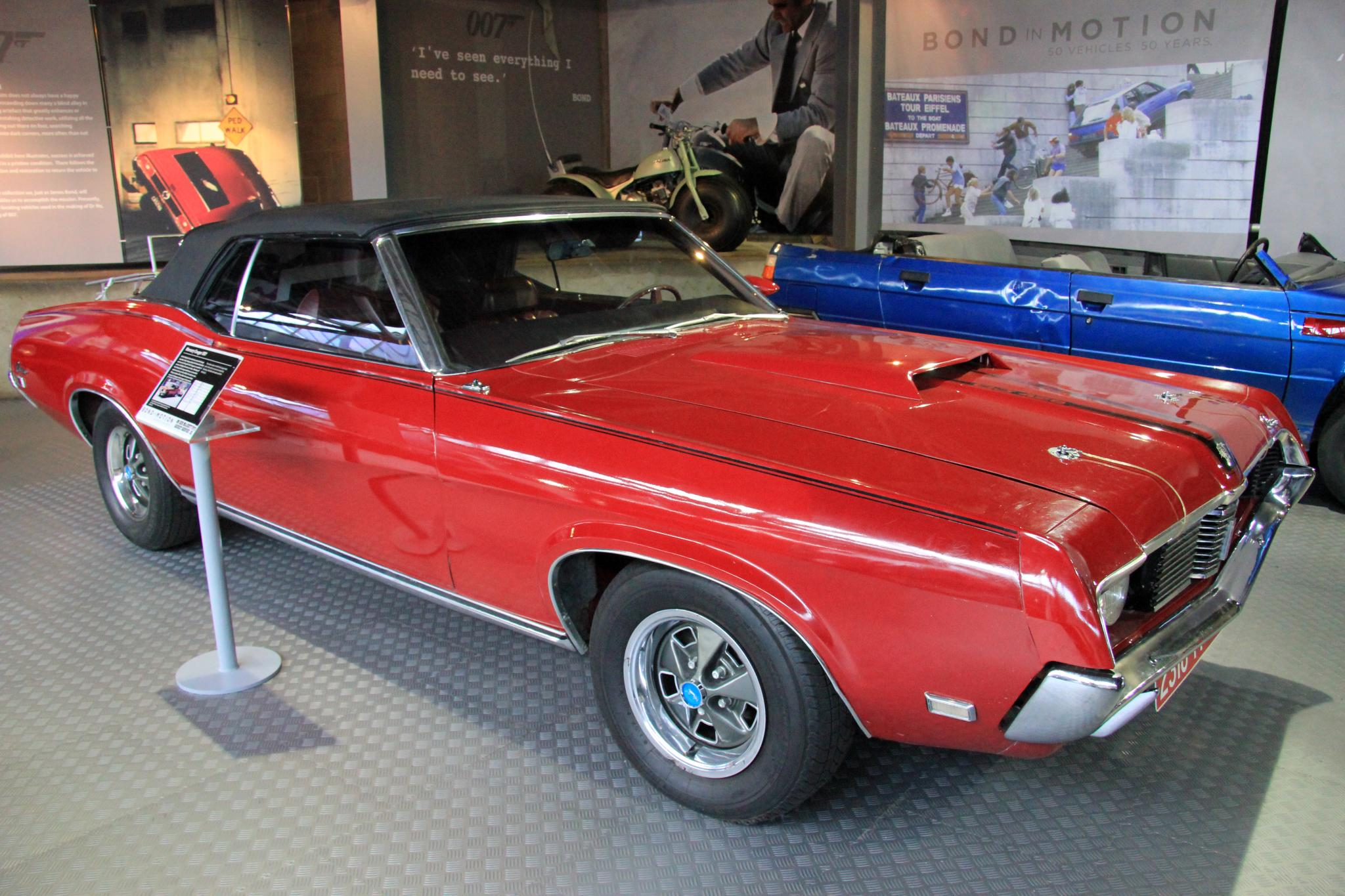
The 1969 Mercury Cougar XR7 used in the film (pictured 2012)

The review-aggregation website Rotten Tomatoes gives the film a score of 81% based on 58 reviews, with a weighted average of 6.9 out of 10. The website's critical consensus states, "George Lazenby's only appearance as 007 is a fine entry in the series, featuring one of the most intriguing Bond girls in Tracy di Vincenzo (Diana Rigg), breathtaking visuals, and some great ski chases." IGN ranked On Her Majesty's Secret Service as the eighth-best Bond film, Entertainment Weekly as the sixth, and Norman Wilner of MSN ranked it fifth. Digital Spy listed the film as the best James Bond film to date. The film also became a fan favourite, seeing "ultimate success in the home video market". In September 2012, On Her Majesty's Secret Service had topped a poll of Bond fans run by 007 Magazine to determine the greatest ever Bond film. Goldfinger came second in the poll and From Russia With Love was third.

Film website Collider, noting the winter setting and locale, labeled the film as both "one of the best Bond films ever made" and "a surprisingly great Christmas movie."

== See also ==
- Outline of James Bond

== Sources ==
- Barnes, Alan; Hearn, Marcus (1997). Kiss Kiss Bang! Bang!: the Unofficial James Bond Film Companion. Batsford Books. ISBN 978-0-7134-8182-2.
- Barnes, Alan; Hearn, Marcus (2001). Kiss Kiss Bang! Bang!: the Unofficial James Bond Film Companion. Batsford Books. ISBN 978-0-7134-8182-2.
- Benson, Raymond (1988). The James Bond Bedside Companion. London: Boxtree Ltd. ISBN 978-1-85283-234-6.
- Berardinelli, James (2003). ReelViews: the Ultimate Guide to the Best 1,000 Modern Movies on DVD and Video. Justin, Charles & Co. ISBN 978-1-932112-06-1.
- Black, Jeremy (2005). The Politics of James Bond: from Fleming's Novel to the Big Screen. University of Nebraska Press. ISBN 978-0-8032-6240-9.
- Block, Alex Ben; Autrey Wilson, Lucy (2010). George Lucas's Blockbusting: A Decade-by-Decade Survey of Timeless Movies Including Untold Secrets of Their Financial and Cultural Success. London: HarperCollins. ISBN 978-0-06-177889-6.
- Bray, Christopher (2010). Sean Connery; The Measure of a Man. London: Faber and Faber. ISBN 978-0-571-23807-1.
- Broccoli, Albert R (1998). When the Snow Melts. London: Boxtree Ltd. ISBN 978-0-7522-1162-6.
- Chapman, James (1999). Licence to Thrill. London / New York City: Cinema and Society. ISBN 978-1-86064-387-3.
- Cork, John; Stutz, Collin (2007). James Bond Encyclopedia. London: Dorling Kindersley. ISBN 978-1-4053-3427-3.
- Dimare, Philip C. (2011). Movies in American History: An Encyclopedia. ABC-CLIO. ISBN 978-1-59884-296-8.
- Fairbanks, Brian W. (2005). Brian W. Fairbanks – Writings. Raleigh, NC: Lulu. ISBN 978-1-4116-2432-0.
- Fiegel, Eddi (2001). John Barry: A Sixties Theme: From James Bond to Midnight Cowboy. Macmillan Publishers. ISBN 978-0-7522-2033-8.
- Field, Matthew; Chowdhury, Ajay (2015). Some Kind of a Hero: The Remarkable Story of the James Bond Films. The History Press. ISBN 978-0-7509-6421-0.
- Gresh, Lois H. (2006). The Science of James Bond: From Bullets to Bowler Hats to Boat Jumps, the Real Technology Behind 007's Fabulous Films. John Wiley & Sons. ISBN 978-0-471-66195-5.
- Knight, Gladys L. (2010). Female Action Heroes: A Guide to Women in Comics, Video Games, Film, and Television. Santa Barbara: ABC-CLIO. ISBN 978-0-313-37612-2.
- Macintyre, Ben (2008). For Yours Eyes Only. London: Bloomsbury Publishing. ISBN 978-0-7475-9527-4.
- Maltin, Leonard (1999). Leonard Maltin's Movie and Video Guide 2000. New York: New American Library. ISBN 978-0-452-28123-3.
- Peary, Danny (1988). Cult Movies Three. Sidgwick & Jackson. ISBN 978-0-671-64810-7.
- Pfeiffer, Lee; Worrall, Dave (1998). The Essential Bond. London: Boxtree Ltd. ISBN 978-0-7522-2477-0.
- Smith, Jim (2002). Bond Films. London: Virgin Books. ISBN 978-0-7535-0709-4.
- White, Rosie R (2007). Violent Femmes: Women as Spies in Popular Culture. London: Routledge. ISBN 978-0-415-37078-3.
