= Sigrun Krokvik =

Norwegian writer (1932–2007)

- Born: Sigrun Karin Christiansen; 30 August 1932
- Died: 8 April 2007 (aged 74)
- Occupation: Crime fiction writer
- Writing career
- Pen name: Sigrun Krokvik
- Language: Norwegian
- Notable works: Bortreist på ubestemt tid, Kikkeren
- Notable awards: Riverton Prize, 1972

Sigrun Karin Christiansen (30 August 1932 – 8 April 2007), better known by the pen name Sigrun Krokvik, was a Norwegian crime fiction writer. She made her literary debut in 1972 with the thriller Bortreist på ubestemt tid. Krokvik published the novel Kikkeren in 1973. She was awarded the Riverton Prize in 1972, and was the first recipient of this prize. Krokvik died on 8 April 2007, at the age of 74.
