= List of James Bond film locations =

This is a list of locations where films in the James Bond series were set and filmed (excluding Casino Royale, 1967, and Never Say Never Again, 1983).

== List of locations ==
Locations are listed in order of appearance. Studio sets are not included.

Location in story	Actual location	Coordinates	Country or region (depicted)
Dr No (1962)
Queen's Club	Liguanea Club	18.004746°N 76.788642°W	Colony of Jamaica
MI6 Headquarters	Queensborough House and Hampton House, Albert Embankment	51.491346°N 0.121997°W	United Kingdom
Le Cercle, Les Ambassadeurs Club	Same	51.504483°N 0.150395°W	United Kingdom
Kingston Airport (now Norman Manley International Airport)	Same	17.937862°N 76.778384°W	Colony of Jamaica
Government House (now King's House)	Same	18.023224°N 76.784196°W	Colony of Jamaica
Puss Feller's	Morgan's Harbour	17.940565°N 76.839477°W	Colony of Jamaica
Hearse crash	Quarry Road	17.962032°N 76.719297°W	Colony of Jamaica
Miss Taro's House	Grand Lido Sans Souci (now Couples Sans Souci)	18.417301°N 77.068075°W	Colony of Jamaica
Bond's hotel	Courtleigh Manor (hotel closed in 1995 and was torn down)	18.010489°N 76.788309°W	Colony of Jamaica
Crab Key beach	Pearly Beach	18.422941°N 77.147911°W	Colony of Jamaica
Bath on Crab Key Island	Dunn's River Falls	18.417415°N 77.139897°W	Colony of Jamaica
Bond, Quarrel, and Honey evade guards in river	White River (Jamaica)	18.413668°N 77.071528°W	Colony of Jamaica
Dragon swamp/death of Quarrel	Salt Marsh west of Falmouth, Jamaica	18.491381°N 77.677531°W	Colony of Jamaica
Dr No's laboratory	Reynold's Pier	18.410495°N 77.114567°W	Colony of Jamaica
From Russia with Love (1963)
SPECTRE Island	Heatherden Hall	51.546447°N 0.533216°W	Unknown
Picnic with Sylvia Trench	River Thames at Hurley	51.551344°N 0.801935°W	United Kingdom
Yeşilköy Airport (now Atatürk Airport)	Same	40.978667°N 28.819366°E	Turkey
Kerim's office and residence	Grand Bazaar, Istanbul	41.010592°N 28.967879°E	Turkey
Meeting with Rosa Klebb	Zincirli Han	41.011334°N 28.968965°E	Turkey
Hagia Sophia	Same	41.008379°N 28.979927°E	Turkey
Basilica Cistern	Same	41.008354°N 28.977849°E	Turkey
Krilencu's apartment	Şehzadebaşı and Fevziye; Bond and Kerim stand across the street at the Damat Ibrahim Mosque	41.012734°N 28.957721°E	Turkey
Russian consulate	161 Halaskargazi Caddesi	41.057657°N 28.986482°E	Turkey
Sirkeci railway station	Same	41.015138°N 28.977042°E	Turkey
Emergency stop of and exit from Orient Express		41.044180°N 28.751073°E	
Zagreb			Yugoslavia
Belgrade			Yugoslavia
Boat launch, Istria, Adriatic Sea	Lunga Estate, Scotland	56.203798°N 5.560473°W	Yugoslavia
Boat chase	Loch Craignish, Scotland	56.171938°N 5.527963°W	
Hotel Danieli	Same	45.433949°N 12.340906°E	Italy
Goldfinger (1964)
Oil tanks and drug laboratory	Esso West London Terminal	51.450731°N 0.459513°W	Mexico
Fontainebleau Miami Beach	Same	25.817486°N 80.121909°W	United States
Stoke Park	Same	51.534664°N 0.602780°W	United Kingdom
London Southend Airport	Same	51.569044°N 0.697522°E	United Kingdom
Fruit stand	Furka Pass	46.590709°N 8.494656°E	Switzerland
Tilly Masterson's car crash	Furka Pass	46.604722°N 8.520444°E	Switzerland
Gas station	Hotel Aurora, Andermatt	46.632235°N 8.592719°E	Switzerland
Entreprises Auric AG	Pilatus Aircraft	46.974098°N 8.380520°E	Switzerland
Blue Grass Airport, Kentucky	RAF Northolt	51.556676°N 0.421125°W	United States
Fort Knox	Same	37.883221°N 85.965171°W	United States
Kentucky Fried Chicken, Louisville	Same (Miami)	25.884134°N 80.211020°W	United States
Scrap yard, Louisville	Atlantic Iron & Metal Co., Miami	25.799469°N 80.24828°W	United States
Godman Army Airfield	RAF Northolt	51.556380°N 0.416730°W	United States
Thunderball (1965)
Chapel, Jacques Bouvar's villa	Château d'Anet	48.858670°N 1.438623°E	France
SPECTRE headquarters	No. 35 Avenue d’Eylau, Paris	48.865126°N 2.283534°E	France
Shrublands	Chalfont Park	51.595579°N 0.545482°W	United Kingdom
Derval's hotel	Royal Saracen's Head, Beaconsfield	51.601626°N 0.636223°W	United Kingdom
RAF Waddington (Vulcan base)	Same; RAF Northolt gates used as entrance	53.170977°N 0.527827°W	United Kingdom
Road from Shrublands (assassination of Lippe)	Silverstone Circuit	52.067589°N 1.013159°W	United Kingdom
Paradise Beach (Bond meets Domino)	Same	25.086796°N 77.328091°W	Bahamas
Bond's Nassau hotel	Coral Harbour Hotel	24.982155°N 77.471918°W	Bahamas
Café Martinique (casino scene)	Same	25.083236°N 77.319862°W	Bahamas
"Palmyra" (Emilio Largo House)	"Rock Point" (Nicholas Sullivan House)	25.073643°N 77.442453°W	Bahamas
Balcony at the Junkanoo	Frederick and Bay Streets, Nassau	25.078149°N 77.342584°W	Bahamas
Picnic with Domino	Love Beach	25.063918°N 77.484164°W	Bahamas
Assembly of diving team	Paradise Island breakwater	25.087199°N 77.321749°W	Bahamas
Grotto	"Thunderball Grotto," Staniel Cay	24.178719°N 76.447023°W	Bahamas
Biscayne Bay, Miami	Same	25.720872°N 80.200276°W	United States
You Only Live Twice (1967)
Secret UN base in Northern Norway	Control and Reporting Centre, Mågerø	59.154801°N 10.44249°E	Norway
Ling's apartment, Hong Kong	45 Tam Kung Road	22.323748°N 114.189056°E	Hong Kong
Pentagon		38.871973°N 77.055923°W	United States
Cape Canaveral		28.584193°N 80.648156°W	United States
NASA control room, Hawaii			United States
Baikonur Cosmodrome		45.911504°N 63.321444°E	Soviet Union
Victoria Harbor and Royal Hong Kong Yacht Club (Bond's funeral)	Same, underwater sequences filmed in Bahamas	22.284296°N 114.182094°E	Hong Kong
Ginza (arrival in Tokyo and JSS tracking Bond)	Same	35.671334°N 139.765032°E	Japan
Kuramae Kokugikan (sumo fight)	Same	35.697604°N 139.788773°E	Japan
Dikko Henderson's house	Good Fukuhisa Restaurant	35.584252°N 139.736925°E	Japan
Osato Chemicals Building	Hotel New Otani Tokyo	35.681223°N 139.734082°E	Japan
Subway station and Tiger Tanaka's office	Nakano-Shimbashi Station	35.692514°N 139.674363°E	Japan
Kobe Docks	Same	34.691884°N 135.214344°E	Japan
Takeoff in plane with Helga Brandt	RAF Finmere	51.984348°N 1.065498°W	Japan
Tiger Tanaka's house	Shigetomi-so	31.608241°N 130.572891°E	Japan
Q's workshop	Tenpozanchō, Kagoshima	31.571715°N 130.560157°E	Japan
Ninja training school	Himeji Castle	34.839395°N 134.693983°E	Japan
Bond's wedding	Seiganto-ji, Nachi Falls	33.669241°N 135.889894°E	Japan
Kissy Suzuki's house, Ama village	Bonotsucho Akime	31.359155°N 130.199487°E	Japan
SPECTRE rocket base (Blofeld's lair)	Shinemoedake	31.911423°N 130.882868°E	Japan
On Her Majesty's Secret Service (1969)
First shot of Bond pulling away in his Aston	Near the Citadel of Cascais, Cascais	38.694755°N 9.420012°W	Portugal
Praia do Guincho	Same	38.732614°N 9.473451°W	Portugal
Palácio Estoril Hotel and Casino Estoril, Estoril	Same	38.704839°N 9.396306°W	Portugal
25 de Abril Bridge (driving to see Draco)	Same	38.690608°N 9.177339°W	Portugal
Draco's office	Port of Lisbon	38.700045°N 9.171011°W	Portugal
Draco's estate (birthday party scene, wedding scene)	Herdade do Zambujal	38.566439°N 8.729620°W	Portugal
Courtship scene, garden	Palace of the Marquises of Fronteira	38.740158°N 9.179808°W	Portugal
Courtship scene, beach	Beach at Herdade do Zambujal	38.524689°N 8.738377°W	Portugal
Office of Gebrüder Gumbold, Bern	Bollwerk 15 (entrance), Hotel Schweizerhof (balcony)	46.949058°N 7.440588°E	Switzerland
"Quarterdeck" (M's house)	"Thames Lawn"	51.568369°N 0.770824°W	United Kingdom
College of Arms, London	Same	51.512199°N 0.098739°W	United Kingdom
Lauterbrunnen Station	Same	46.598321°N 7.907904°E	Switzerland
Helicopter takeoff	Below First	46.641330°N 8.055976°E	Switzerland
Piz Gloria	Same	46.557311°N 7.835159°E	Switzerland
Birg	Same	46.561831°N 7.857541°E	Switzerland
Stechelberg cable car station	Same	46.555182°N 7.901793°E	Switzerland
Cliff edge	Same; Christmas festival projected on the village of Stechelberg below	46.549738°N 7.895047°E	Switzerland
Christmas festival and skating rink	Grindelwald town centre	46.624090°N 8.034497°E	Switzerland
Phone booth (Tracy calls the town Feldkirch)	Beim Alten Schulhaus, Lauterbrunnen	46.593578°N 7.907167°E	Switzerland
Stock car race	Field south of Lauterbrunnen	46.586159°N 7.913447°E	Switzerland
Barn	Obers Äbnit, Heiligenschwendi	46.755273°N 7.686972°E	Switzerland
Morning ski chase/avalanche	Susten pass	46.729806°N 8.446980°E	Switzerland
Joalharia Ferreira Marques (jeweler in Lisbon)	Same	38.712917°N 9.139106°W	Portugal
Tracy's assassination	Miradouro do Portinho da Arrábida	38.481294°N 8.989369°W	Portugal
Diamonds Are Forever (1971)
Tokyo			Japan
Cairo casino			United Arab Republic (now Egypt)
Marie's beach	Villa Médy Roc, Cap d'Antibes	43.546361°N 7.125815°E	France
Plastic Surgery lab/Spa			Unnamed Latin American country
Kimberley-area diamond mines	Wint and Kidd scenes shot near Floyd Lamb Park at Tule Springs, Las Vegas	36.324115°N 115.267186°W	South Africa
MI6 headquarters in central London			United Kingdom
Dover hoverport	Same	51.127046°N 1.333748°E	United Kingdom
Magere Brug (The Skinny Bridge), Amsterdam	Same	52.363627°N 4.902484°E	Netherlands
Tiffany's apartment	Reguliersgracht 36, Amsterdam	52.363836°N 4.895645°E	Netherlands
Frankfurt Airport	Same	50.037286°N 8.561427°E	West Germany
Theme Building, Los Angeles International Airport	same	33.944313°N 118.402935°W	United States
Slumber, Inc. funeral parlor, Las Vegas	Palm Boulder Highway Mortuary & Cemetery, Henderson, NV, (exterior) and Palm Downtown Mortuary & Cemetery, Las Vegas, NV (courtyard)	36.027809°N 114.967275°W 36.185684°N 115.136778°W	United States
Tropicana Las Vegas (Bond's hotel)	Same	36.098890°N 115.170390°W	United States
Whyte House Hotel and Casino, Las Vegas	Westgate Las Vegas (exterior), and Riviera Las Vegas (interiors)	36.135757°N 115.152127°W 36.135492°N 115.159235°W	United States
Circus Circus Las Vegas	Same	36.136818°N 115.163277°W	United States
Tiffany's Las Vegas villa	Kirk Douglas residence, 515 W Via Lola, Palm Springs	33.837001°N 116.552303°W	United States
McCarran International Airport	Same	36.083260°N 115.149947°W	United States
Gas station (Bond and Tiffany track Metz)	ARCO, 2955 Paradise Rd, Las Vegas	36.136044°N 115.155111°W	United States
Willard Whyte Tectronics and desert chase	PABCO Gypsum plant, 8000 E Lake Mead Blvd, Las Vegas	36.230512°N 114.872696°W	United States
Freemont Street car chase	Same	36.171191°N 115.144862°W	United States
The Mint Las Vegas car park chase	Same	36.168996°N 115.138342°W	United States
The Whyte House external elevator	Landmark Casino	36.133759°N 115.157823°W	United States
Wint and Kidd bury Bond in a desert construction site	tunnel: Delivery tunnel at Hoover Dam. burial site: near Meet Up Lava Butte, E Lake Mead Blvd, Henderson, NV	36.016221°N 114.737753°W 36.186646°N 114.918685°W	United States
Willard Whyte's villa outside of Las Vegas	Elrod House, 2175 Southridge Drive, Palm Springs	33.793782°N 116.510946°W	United States
Oil rig off Baja California	Off the coast of Oceanside, California	33.197673°N 117.377951°W	Mexico
Port of Los Angeles and the RMS Queen Elizabeth	Same and the SS Canberra	33.738682°N 118.260827°W	United States
Live and Let Die (1973)
United Nations Building, New York City	Same	40.749506°N 73.967291°W	United States
French Quarter, New Orleans jazz funeral	837 Chartres St, intersecting with Dumaine St.	29.959191°N 90.062630°W	United States
San Monique cemetery/village	Filmed near Montego Bay		(fictional Caribbean island) Jamaica
Bond's flat, Chelsea, London		51.489058°N 0.162701°W	United Kingdom
Worldport (Pan Am), John F. Kennedy International Airport	Same	40.642387°N 73.785855°W	United States
FDR Drive, New York City	Same, the Brooklyn Bridge and Manhattan Bridge are visible in the background	40.749855°N 73.966383°W	United States
Felix's command center, Financial District, Manhattan	70 Wall Street (building now demolished). 40 Wall Street and 48 Wall Street are visible in background.	40.706055°N 74.008553°W	United States
Taxi cab crash, Lower Manhattan	Same, the corner of Broad Street and South Street at 2 New York Plaza	40.701961°N 74.011020°W	United States
San Monique Consulate, Upper East Side, Manhattan	35 E 69th Street	40.769648°N 73.965730°W	United States
Oh Cult Voodoo Shop and garage	33 E 65th Street	40.767498°N 73.968037°W	United States
Cab ride up to Harlem through Central Park	Same, Bond heads north on Center Drive and East Dr, later exits at Lenox Avenue.	40.767539°N 73.976249°W	United States
Bond tracked through Harlem, New York (shoeshine checkpoint)	Same, Bond turns right at Lenox Ave and 124th St. Ephesus Seventh Day Adventist Church is visible in the background.	40.807168°N 73.945742°W	United States
Fillet of Soul restaurant and Mr. Big's hideout	referenced as Lenox Ave and 124th St, but filmed at Second Ave and 94th St. Alley filmed at 118th Street	40.807114°N 73.945618°W40.783007°N 73.947727°W	United States
Bond and Rosie's hotel, including Baron Samedi's stage show and tarot shop	Couples San Souci, Ocho Rios and Half Moon Point Resort, Montego Bay	18.416789°N 77.069314°W 18.523878°N 77.846673°W	(fictional Caribbean island) Jamaica
Quarrel Jr's wharf	Gunpoint Wharf docks, Montego Bay harbor near Harbour St and Barnett St	18.471034°N 77.926544°W	(fictional Caribbean island) Jamaica
Picnic at waterfalls	Dunn's River Falls	18.416259°N 77.134763°W	(fictional Caribbean island) Jamaica
Bus chase scenes	Filmed near Johnson Town and Lucea, Jamaica	18.436752°N 78.168269°W	(fictional Caribbean island) Jamaica
Hampden Wharf Jetty (end of bus chase)	Falmouth, Jamaica	18.492796°N 77.649462°W	(fictional Caribbean island) Jamaica
Louis Armstrong New Orleans International Airport, New Orleans	Same	29.994340°N 90.258861°W	United States
Lakefront Airport	Same	30.041495°N 90.023020°W	United States
Fillet of Soul - New Orleans	828-830 Chartres St, New Orleans	29.958768°N 90.062574°W	United States
Kananga's crocodile farm, "Trespassers will be eaten"	Jamaica Swamp Safari, Falmouth, Jamaica	18.490076°N 77.670295°W	United States
Boat chase scenes (jumps boat over highway and Miller's Bridge)	Rt 39 near Phoenix, Louisiana	29.646875°N 89.937404°W	United States
Boat chase scenes (pool, wedding, death of Adam)	Slidell, Louisiana	30.275466°N 89.781080°W	United States
End of boat chase, Lake Pontchartrain	Southern Yacht Club marina, New Orleans	30.027576°N 90.113836°W	United States
Dr. Kananga's underground lair	Green Grotto Caves	18.462070°N 77.374788°W	(fictional Caribbean island) Jamaica
New Orleans Union Passenger Terminal	Same	29.946586°N 90.077734°W	United States
The Man with the Golden Gun (1974)
Scaramanga's Island, off the coast of China in the South China Sea	Ko Tapu, near Phuket	8.274591°N 98.501151°E	China
MI6 headquarters in central London			United Kingdom
Saida's nightclub, Beirut		33.904905°N 35.504246°E	Lebanon
Lazar's workshop, Macau		22.199101°N 113.544004°E	(Portugal) Portuguese Macao
Casino Macau Palace, Rua das Lorchas, between Ponte No 12 and 14	Same	22.195654°N 113.535407°E	(Portugal) Portuguese Macao
China Ferry Terminal, Kowloon Peninsula, Hong Kong	Same	22.299246°N 114.167038°E	Hong Kong
The Peninsula Hong Kong	Same	22.295732°N 114.171896°E	Hong Kong
Bottoms Up Club, 14 Hankow Road	Same	22.2966°N 114.171°E	Hong Kong
Wreck of RMS Queen Elizabeth, Victoria Harbour	Same	22.298770°N 114.127865°E	Hong Kong
Hai Fat's estate, Bangkok	Hong Kong Dragon Garden	22.363556°N 114.050975°E	Thailand
Hai Fat's karate school	Ancient Siam, Dvaravati House	13.546477°N 100.627529°E	Thailand
Bangkok Noi canal (longtail boat chase)	Same	13.787455°N 100.476124°E	Thailand
Sampheng (longtail boat chase)	Same	13.740681°N 100.508890°E	Thailand
Mandarin Oriental, Bangkok	Same	13.723725°N 100.514488°E	Thailand
Rajadamnern Stadium	Same	13.761659°N 100.508512°E	Thailand
AMC Hornet chase, passes the Giant Swing and Democracy Monument	Same	13.751827°N 100.501290°E 13.756902°N 100.501889°E	Thailand
Astro spiral jump site, outskirts of Bangkok	Same	13.99383°N 100.64174°E	Thailand
Islands approaching Scaramanga's Island	Phang Nga Bay	8.259030°N 98.492109°E	China
The Spy Who Loved Me (1977)
Norwegian Sea (Submarine abduction)	Same	71.853499°N 15.730636°E	Norway
"Berngarten", Austrian Alps	Ski chase: Piz Bernina, Switzerland, ski jump: Mount Asgard, Auyuittuq National Park, Baffin Island, Canada	46.382897°N 9.908112°E66.672476°N 65.274229°W	Austria
KGB headquarters in Moscow		55.760635°N 37.627989°E	Soviet Union (now Russia)
Royal Navy submarine pens	HM Naval Base Clyde (Faslane)	56.083527°N 4.808626°W	United Kingdom
Atlantis, near Costa Smeralda, Sardinia	Same	41.050312°N 9.625477°E	Italy
Sheik Hossein's camp, Saqqara oasis	Same, Pyramid of Djoser in background	29.864775°N 31.223552°E	Egypt
Mosque of Ibn Tulun, Cairo	Same	30.028917°N 31.249441°E	Egypt
Fekkesh's house	Gayer-Anderson Museum	30.028383°N 31.250826°E	Egypt
Giza pyramid complex, Sound & Light show	Same	29.974583°N 31.139511°E	Egypt
Mojaba nightclub	modeled after Mena House Hotel	29.985531°N 31.133039°E	Egypt
Great Hypostyle Hall, Temple of Karnak, Luxor	Same	25.718710°N 32.657856°E	Egypt
River Nile	Same	26.746515°N 31.577901°E	Egypt
Abu Simbel, MI6 base	Same	22.338043°N 31.625807°E	Egypt
Palau docks, Sardinia	Same	41.182118°N 9.386095°E	Italy
Hotel Cala di Volpe, Costa Smeralda	Same	41.090359°N 9.541039°E	Italy
Car chase scenes (Capo Caccia)	Same	40.564858°N 8.164608°E	Italy
Lotus Esprit into the water (Liscia di Vacco jetty)	Same, underwater scenes filmes in Bahamas	41.140870°N 9.510381°E 24.97962°N 77.457008°W	Italy
Lotus Esprit drives onto beach (Spiaggia di Capriccioli Est)		41.079004°N 9.551784°E	Italy
North Atlantic, near the Azores (Sub and Liparus scenes)	Bahamas (underwater sequences)	39.852607°N 26.112370°W	Portugal
Ships pick up escape pod	off the coast of Malta	36.075236°N 14.493805°E	Malta
Moonraker (1979)
Space Shuttle hijack over Yukon Territory		63.698966°N 135.694235°W	Canada
Airplane and circus	filmed over Napa Valley, California and Longchamp Racecourse, Paris	38.444336°N 122.281525°W 48.859346°N 2.229460°E	uncertain, returning from Morocco
MI6 headquarters in central London			United Kingdom
Theme Building, Los Angeles International Airport	Same	33.944313°N 118.402935°W	United States
Drax's chateau, California	Chateau de Vaux-le-Vicomte (exterior), Château de Guermantes (grand salon), France	48.565939°N 2.714167°E 48.852818°N 2.697759°E	United States
Moonraker Research and Construction facility, Mojave Desert	Rockwell International, tubular hall filmed at Centre Pompidou	34.638855°N 118.082151°W 48.860722°N 2.352294°E	United States
Piazza San Marco, Venice	Same	45.434237°N 12.338471°E	Italy
Venini Glass, Piazetta dei Leoni	Same (exterior), Murano Glass Museum (interiors)	45.435046°N 12.339696°E 45.456706°N 12.356902°E	Italy
St Mark's Clocktower (Corinne's death and end of Chang fight)	Same	45.435359°N 12.339180°E	Italy
Hotel Danieli, Venice	Same	45.433971°N 12.342109°E	Italy
Drax's reception room (laboratory, next morning)	Ca' Rezzonico	45.433807°N 12.326975°E	Italy
Galeão International Airport, Rio de Janeiro	Same	22.798255°S 43.269087°W	Brazil
Copacabana Palace (Bond's hotel)	Same	22.967133°S 43.178954°W	Brazil
Rua de Carioca, Carnival celebrations	Same	22.906441°S 43.180402°W	Brazil
Sugarloaf Mountain (cable car)	Same	22.949497°S 43.156547°W	Brazil
Corcovado (ambulance ride)	Same, Christo Redentor visible in background	22.951673°S 43.211179°W	Brazil
MI6 Station house, Brazil	Monastery of San Nicolò al Lido	45.427960°N 12.380590°E	Brazil
Amazon Basin, "Upper regions of the Amazoco River" (boat chase)	St. Lucie River, Florida	27.261315°N 80.325096°W	Brazil
Waterfall (hanglider and lured to pyramid)	Iguazu Falls	25.689900°S 54.440796°W	Brazil
Drax's jungle pyramid control center	Tikal, Guatemala (exterior)	17.222286°N 89.623656°W	Brazil
Cavern catacombs beneath the control center	Catacombs of Paris	48.834224°N 2.332400°E	Brazil
Drax's space station			Outer space
Edwards Air Force Base	Same	34.922242°N 117.890553°W	United States
Kremlin, Moscow	Same	55.751028°N 37.617556°E	Soviet Union (now Russia)
For Your Eyes Only (1981)
Church and cemetery (Tracy's grave)	Church of St Giles, Stoke Poges, Buckinghamshire	51.535155°N 0.594835°W	United Kingdom
Beckton Gas Works, London (helicopter ride)	Same	51.514373°N 0.076793°E	United Kingdom
Sinking of the St Georges, off the coast of Albania	near Corfu	39.861223°N 19.8878746°E	Albania
Ministry of Defence, Whitehall, London	Same	51.504782°N 0.124719°W	United Kingdom
KGB headquarters in Moscow	Same	55.760635°N 37.627989°E	Soviet Union (now Russia)
Triana yacht, Kalami bay, Corfu (Havelocks assassination)	Same	39.741861°N 19.935702°E	Greece
Gonzales' villa outside Madrid	Villa Sylva, Corfu	39.593006°N 19.920712°E	Spain
Citroen car chase	in and around Pagoi, Corfu	39.708601°N 19.701829°E	Spain
MI6 headquarters			United Kingdom
Miramonti Majestic Grand Hotel, Cortina d'Ampezzo	Same	46.522096°N 12.144060°E	Italy
Tofana di Rozes	Same	46.551237°N 12.066580°E	Italy
Olympic Ice Stadium	Same	46.544100°N 12.133763°E	Italy
Piazza Angelo Dibona (motorcycle attack)	Same	46.537166°N 12.137087°E	Italy
Eugenio Monti Olympic bobsleigh track	Same	46.546238°N 12.127110°E	Italy
Olympic ski jump hill	Same	46.510681°N 12.146218°E	Italy
Achilleion Palace, Corfu (casino)	Same	39.562957°N 19.904305°E	Greece
Lisl's villa and dunes	Issos Beach, Agios Georgios, Argyrades	39.432191°N 19.926519°E	Greece
Greece–Albania border (Columbo's attack)	Old Fortress, Corfu and harbor area	39.623736°N 19.926436°E	Albania and Greece
Bond and Melina go shopping, Corfu town	Bond meets Melina at Vlacherna Monastery pier. While shopping, Saint Spyridon Church tower is visible in the background	39.590717°N 19.917229°E39.625505°N 19.922853°E	Greece
Bond and Melina's evening stroll and overlook	Square of Dionysios Solomonos and Achilleion Palace Garden	39.621346°N 19.924826°E39.563807°N 19.904445°E	Greece
Return to the St. Georges and keelhauling	Underwater scenes (including Greek temple) filmed in Bahamas	39.852607°N 26.112370°W	Greece
Danilia Village (Greek wedding)	Same	39.641792°N 19.833651°E	Greece
St. Cyril's Monastery, Meteora	Monastery of the Holy Trinity, Meteora	39.713292°N 21.635801°E	Greece
10 Downing Street, London	Same	51.503746°N 0.127633°W	United Kingdom
Octopussy (1983)
Latin American Airbase, probably Cuba	RAF Northolt	51.554082°N 0.418700°W	Unnamed Latin American country (Cuba)
Acrostar Bede BD-5J jet chase and gas station	Filmed over Hurricane Mesa, Utah, gas station in Santa Clara, Utah, Santa Clara Dr.	37.249686°N 113.208245°W 37.134622°N 113.663736°W	Unnamed Latin American country (Cuba)
009 chased through forest, East Berlin (now Berlin)	Orton Mere, Nene Park, Peterborough	52.558103°N 0.280812°W	East Germany (now Germany)
British Ambassador's residence, East Berlin	Heatherden Hall, Pinewood Studios	51.546943°N 0.533394°W	East Germany (now Germany)
MI6 headquarters, London	Same		United Kingdom
Moscow, conference room	Same		Soviet Union (now Russia)
Russian National Fine Art Repository	Chapel, Old Royal Naval College	51.482857°N 0.006674°W	Soviet Union (now Russia)
Sotheby's Auction House, London	Same	51.511959°N 0.143799°W	United Kingdom
Taj Mahal, India	Same	27.175316°N 78.042174°E	India
Gangaur Ghat, Lake Pichola, Udaipur (Bond meets Vijay)	Same	24.580781°N 73.681925°E	India
Shiv Niwas Palace (Bond's hotel and backgammon game)	Same	24.576499°N 73.683513°E	India
tuk tuk chase and market	area around Jagdish Temple	24.580011°N 73.683709°E	India
Octopussy's floating palace	Jag Niwas Palace and Jag Mandir	24.575828°N 73.680010°E 24.567964°N 73.677886°E	India
Monsoon Palace, Kamal's residence	Same	24.593399°N 73.639594°E	India
Kamal's jungle hunt	City Palace gardens	24.572540°N 73.686972°E	India
Kurfürstendamm, Kaiser Wilhelm Memorial Church, and Checkpoint Charlie, West Berlin	Same	52.506044°N 13.335251°E 52.507548°N 13.390386°E	West Germany (now Germany)
Karl-Marx-Stadt German Military Base (now Chemnitz)	Same	50.918465°N 13.049574°E	East Germany
Railway sequence from East to West Germany	Nene Valley Railway, Cambridgeshire	52.569389°N 0.388432°W	East Germany West Germany
German village	modeled after Ritterplatz, Bensheim, Hessen	49.682859°N 8.621667°E	West Germany
Auto chase through the Black Forest	Sections filmed at AVUS racetrack and roadway	52.471038°N 13.238734°E	West Germany
"Feldstadt" US Military Base	RAF Upper Heyford	51.936165°N 1.138225°W	West Germany
Kamal's plane escape	Hurricane Mesa, Utah	37.249686°N 113.208245°W	India
A View to a Kill (1985)
Kamchatka Peninsula, Siberia	Vedretta di Scersen inferior, Switzerland and Vatnajökull glacier, Höfn, Iceland	46.371653°N 9.880351°E 64.112820°N 16.283159°W	Soviet Union (now Russia)
MI6 headquarters in central London	Old War Office Building, Whitehall	51.505552°N 0.125926°W	United Kingdom
Ascot Racecourse	Same	51.412647°N 0.679356°W	United Kingdom
Eiffel Tower and Trocadero Gardens, Paris	Same	48.858525°N 2.294502°E	France
Quais along the south bank of the Seine River	Same	48.862873°N 2.300746°E	France
Pont Alexandre III (end of cab chase, Bond jumps onto bateau mouche)	Same	48.863550°N 2.313492°E	France
Palais de Justice (After Bond's arrest)	Same	48.856560°N 2.345448°E	France
Château de Chantilly	Same	49.193839°N 2.485521°E	France
Zorin's underground microchip facility	Renault Centre, Swindon, England	51.567156°N 1.824008°W	France
BP gas station, Chantilly (car wash)	Same	49.190069°N 2.462747°E	France
Steeplechase track, Chantilly Forest	Same	49.188384°N 2.552170°E	France
Bond's Rolls-Royce into lake	Wraysbury Reservoir, UK	51.459935°N 0.523695°W	France
Chantilly Racecourse (Gogol confronts Zorin)	Same	49.189983°N 2.474599°E	France
Pier 45, Fisherman's Wharf, San Francisco	Same	37.808506°N 122.415771°W	United States
Zorin's oil rig, San Francisco Bay	south of Richmond–San Rafael Bridge and Keller Beach	37.924009°N 122.408760°W	United States
Japantown, San Francisco	Same	37.785942°N 122.429966°W	United States
San Francisco City Hall	Same	37.779609°N 122.419348°W	United States
Stacey's mansion	Dunsmuir House	37.743139°N 122.141073°W	United States
Lefty O'Doul Bridge (end of fire truck chase)	Same	37.777022°N 122.390300°W	United States
Main Strike Mine, southeast of San Jose, Silicon Valley	Amberley Museum & Heritage Centre, UK (exterior)	37.100713°N 121.542906°W 50.898054°N 0.539498°W	United States
Transamerica Pyramid	Same	37.795786°N 122.402693°W	United States
Golden Gate Bridge	Same	37.822470°N 122.480541°W	United States
The Living Daylights (1987)
Upper Rock, Rock of Gibraltar	Same	36.145306°N 5.342143°W	Gibraltar
Concert hall, Bratislava	Vienna Volksoper (exterior) and Sofiensaal (interior), Vienna	48.224590°N 16.350106°E 48.206769°N 16.391101°E	Czechoslovakia (now Slovakia)
Bratislava Gas Works (Koskov smuggled out)	Vienna Gasometers	48.185201°N 16.420144°E	Czechoslovakia
MI6 headquarters in central London	57 Trafalgar Square	51.507383°N 0.128268°W	United Kingdom
Bladen safe house	Stonor House, Stonor Park, Oxfordshire	51.596600°N 0.929422°W	United Kingdom
Kara's apartment, Bratislava	Antoniogasse 94, Vienna	48.225747°N 16.330506°E	Czechoslovakia
Tram depot	Kreuzgasse 72, Vienna	48.226231°N 16.332465°E	Czechoslovakia
Frozen Lake	Weissensee, Austria	46.715152°N 13.295467°E	Czechoslovakia
Czechoslovakia–Austria border	Naggler Alm, near Weissensee	46.704622°N 13.314496°E	Czechoslovakia and Austria
Schönbrunn Palace and Gloriette, Vienna (Carriage ride)	Same	48.185379°N 16.312701°E	Austria
Palais Schwarzenberg (Bond and Kara's hotel)	Same	48.197217°N 16.376944°E	Austria
Schönbrunn Palace Theater (opera)	Same	48.187090°N 16.312255°E	Austria
Wiener Riesenrad, Prater Amusement Park	Same	48.216840°N 16.395951°E	Austria
Whitaker's villa, Tangier	Forbes Museum	35.791466°N 5.825019°W	Morocco
Gran Cafe de Paris (Bond tracks Pushkin)	Same	35.782247°N 5.812510°W	Morocco
Hotel Ile de France (Pushkin's hotel)	French Consulate General, Tangier	35.781112°N 5.812614°W	Morocco
Conference Hall (Pushkin's Assassination)	Elveden Hall, Suffolk, England	52.385385°N 0.679713°E	Morocco
Area around Kasbah Palace, Tangier (rooftop escape)	Same	35.788657°N 5.812785°W	Morocco
Fishing Port de Tangier	Same	35.791171°N 5.810664°W	Morocco
Le Mirage Hotel	Same	35.759157°N 5.938814°W	Morocco
Tangier Ibn Battouta Airport	Same	35.726304°N 5.912933°W	Morocco
Soviet airbase	Ouarzazate Airport, Atlas Mountains, Morocco	30.93543°N 6.907947°W	Afghanistan
Mujahideen stronghold	Kasbah of Tamdakht, near Aït Benhaddou	31.085493°N 7.145800°W	Afghanistan
Canyon bridge, near Tikrite	Same	30.975226°N 7.100039°W	Afghanistan
Baluchistan (Jeep lands)			Pakistan
Licence to Kill (1989)
Cray Key	Near Isla Mujeres, Mexico	21.236435°N 86.736037°W	Bahamas
St. Mary Star of the Sea Church, Key West	Same	24.553190°N 81.795503°W	United States
Seven Mile Bridge, Florida Keys	Same	24.702659°N 81.156452°W	United States
Leiter's house and wedding reception	707 South St, Key West	24.549368°N 81.7938398°W	United States
Ocean Exotica Fish Warehouse	631 Greene Street, Key West (now Conch Republic Seafood Restaurant)	24.561034°N 81.803101°W	United States
Sharkey's dock and ship charters	Same	24.559508°N 81.785801°W	United States
Mallory Square, Key West	Same	24.560053°N 81.807636°W	United States
Ernest Hemingway House and Key West lighthouse	Same	24.552720°N 81.800647°W	United States
Aboard the Wavekrest and waterski escape	Near Isla Mujeres, Mexico	21.236435°N 86.736037°W	United States
Barrelhead Bar, Bimini Islands	711 Eisenhower Bar, Key West (now Thai Island Restaurant)	24.561113°N 81.789171°W	Bahamas
MI6 headquarters in central London			United Kingdom
Isthmus City, Republic of Isthmus	Mexico City, Mexico		Republic of Isthmus (fictional)
El Presidente Hotel	Biblioteca del Banco de Mexico (exterior), Gran Hotel Ciudad de Mexico (interior)	19.430876°N 99.136394°W 19.432437°N 99.134637°W	Republic of Isthmus (fictional)
Banco de Isthmus	Palacio de Correos de México, Mexico City	19.435669°N 99.140220°W	Republic of Isthmus (fictional)
Isthmus Casino	Casino Español de México, Mexico City	19.433155°N 99.136557°W	Republic of Isthmus (fictional)
Sanchez's office	Teatro de la Ciudad, Mexico City (exterior)	19.436734°N 99.137238°W	Republic of Isthmus (fictional)
Sanchez's villa	Villa Arabesque, Acapulco	16.830397°N 99.864751°W	Republic of Isthmus (fictional)
Isthmus City harbor	US Coast Guard pier, Key West	24.565540°N 81.797758°W	Republic of Isthmus (fictional)
Olimpatec Meditation Institute	Centro Ceremonial Otomí	19.531739°N 99.522339°W	Republic of Isthmus (fictional)
Tanker chase	La Rumorosa road, near Mexicali	32.583829°N 116.025663°W	Republic of Isthmus (fictional)
GoldenEye (1995)
Arkangelsk chemical weapons facility, Dam Section	Contra Dam, Switzerland	46.196683°N 8.848501°E	Soviet Union
Monte Carlo Casino	Same	43.739171°N 7.427936°E	Monaco
Fort Antoine Theatre	Same	43.733102°N 7.427942°E	Monaco
Quai des États-Unis (French warship docked)	Same	43.736917°N 7.423767°E	Monaco
MI6 Building	Same	51.487382°N 0.124615°W	United Kingdom
Palace Square, St. Petersburg	Same	59.938819°N 30.315950°E	Russia
Winter Palace, St. Petersburg (interior)	Drapers' Hall, London	51.515163°N 0.086486°W	Russia
Pulkovo Airport, St. Petersburg	Epsom Downs Racecourse	51.313578°N 0.254351°W	Russia
Railway station	St Pancras Station, London	51.530389°N 0.125237°W	Russia
Square in St. Petersburg (car breakdown)	Somerset House, London	51.511018°N 0.117126°W	Russia
Our Lady of Smolensk	Brompton Cemetery (exterior), Saint Sophia Cathedral (interior)		Russia
Grand Hotel l'Europe	Langham Hotel, London	51.517970°N 0.144019°W	Russia
Jail in St. Petersburg	Saint Michael’s Castle	59.939842°N 30.338121°E	Russia
Train parked	British Sugar Corporation, Peterborough	52.551111°N 0.320803°W	Russia
Train crash with tank	Mill Lane Bridge, Nene Valley Railway, near Peterborough	52.563367°N 0.335710°W	Russia
BMW/plane trade with Wade	Road near Punta Garza, Puerto Rico	18.485220°N 66.371747°W	Cuba
Beach house	Playa Ojo de Agua, Puerto Rico	18.553412°N 66.471123°W	Cuba
Janus Satellite Dish	Arecibo Observatory	18.34661°N 66.75278°W	Cuba
Wade finds Bond	Field near Tortuguero Lagoon, Puerto Rico	18.470265°N 66.446876°W	Cuba
Tomorrow Never Dies (1997)
Terrorist market near the Khyber Pass	Altiport de Peyresourde-Balestas, Pyrenees, France	42.797142°N 0.4342261°E	Pakistan
New College, Oxford, University of Oxford	Same	51.754957°N 1.250650°W	United Kingdom
MI6 headquarters in central London	Somerset House	51.511199°N 0.117158°W	United Kingdom
Hamburg Airport	London Stansted Airport	51.886897°N 0.241424°E	Germany
Hotel Atlantic Hamburg and Lombardsbrücke	Same (exterior), Stoke Park, Buckinghamshire (interiors)	53.557050°N 10.004977°E 53.557320°N 9.997225°E	Germany
CMGN Hamburg Headquarters	IBM Building-Bedfont Lakes, Feltham	51.446996°N 0.447449°W	Germany
Carver's printing press plant	Harmsworth Quays Printers Ltd (now Printworks (London), and Westferry Printers, London	51.497676°N 0.043692°W 51.495082°N 0.021672°W	Germany
Avis rental office, Mönckebergstraße	Same	53.55165°N 10.004424°E	Germany
Hamburg car park escape	Brent Cross Shopping Centre (car park sequence)	51.577847°N 0.224693°W	Germany
US Air Force base, Okinawa, Japan	RAF Lakenheath	52.390461°N 0.537270°E	Japan
South China Sea	Baja Studios in Rosarito, Mexico	32.287618°N 117.036543°W	Vietnam
Carver's skyscraper, Ho Chi Minh City	Sinn Sathorn Tower, Bangkok	13.723719°N 100.499985°E	Vietnam
Motorcycle chase	Tha Dien Dang Road and Wat Saket area, Bangkok	13.732452°N 100.502404°E 13.754312°N 100.508261°E	Vietnam
Shower street and Wai Lin's hideout	Soi Nana, Sampheng	13.740623°N 100.514120°E	Vietnam
Hạ Long Bay	Phang Nga Bay	8.259030°N 98.492109°E	Vietnam
The World Is Not Enough (1999)
Guggenheim Museum Bilbao	Same	43.267389°N 2.934505°W	Spain
SIS Building, London	Same	51.487382°N 0.124428°W	United Kingdom
River Thames, London	Isle of Dogs area	51.496825°N 0.014665°W	United Kingdom
The Millenium Dome (balloon lift off)	Same	51.503400°N 0.003201°E	United Kingdom
King's funeral	Stowe School	52.031507°N 1.017933°W	United Kingdom
Castle Thane	Eilean Donan	57.273975°N 5.516419°W	United Kingdom
Baku, Azerbaijan oil fields	Same	40.321942°N 49.832582°E	Azerbaijan
Pipeline construction site and chapel	Cuenca, Spain	40.070811°N 2.141528°W	Azerbaijan
Skiing in the Caucasus Mountains	Mont Blanc area	45.838162°N 6.867529°E	Azerbaijan
Elektra's palace	Küçüksu Pavilion (exterior), Luton Hoo (interior)	41.079160°N 29.064964°E 51.845510°N 0.399401°W	Azerbaijan
Casino L'Or Noir	Halton House	51.782590°N 0.725462°W	Azerbaijan
Azerbaijani airport	RAF Northolt	51.554362°N 0.418668°W	Azerbaijan
Russian ICBM base	Bardenas Reales	42.194501°N 1.470597°W	Kazakhstan
Turkish pipeline and terminal	pipeline: Cwm Dyli, Snowdonia terminal: Motorola Building (now Vygon), Swindon	53.070555°N 4.037384°W 51.602778°N 1.785995°W	Turkey
Caviar Factory, Caspian Sea	filmed at Pinewood Studios and Hankley Common	38.770139°N 48.847649°E	Azerbaijan
Maiden's Tower, Istanbul	Same	41.021864°N 29.004238°E	Turkey
Die Another Day (2002)
Bond surfs onto Korean shore	Peʻahi, Hawaii and Holywell, Cornwall	20.946289°N 156.296582°W 50.393338°N 5.147113°W	North Korea and South Korea
Korean Demilitarized Zone	Aldershot Garrison, Hampshire	51.265190°N 0.756627°W	North Korea and South Korea
Victoria Harbour and Kowloon Peninsula, Hong Kong		22.293000°N 114.159051°E	Hong Kong
Arrival in Havana, Cuba	Avenida Campo del Sur, Cádiz, Spain	36.528971°N 6.297697°W	Cuba
Cigar Factory and cathedral meeting	Mercado Central and Cádiz Cathedral	36.531092°N 6.297998°W 36.529213°N 6.294736°W	Cuba
Jinx emerges from the sea and beachfront hotel	Playa de la Caleta and La Caleta beachhouse	36.530523°N 6.305883°W	Cuba
Alves Gene Therapy Clinic	Castillo de San Sebastian	36.528256°N 6.315394°W	Cuba
Buckingham Palace, London (Graves' arrival)	Same	51.501497°N 0.141847°W	United Kingdom
Blades Gentlemen Club (fencing)	The Reform Club, Pall Mall, London	51.506773°N 0.133553°W	United Kingdom
Abandoned subway station "Vauxhall Cross", off Westminster Bridge	Same, near County Hall	51.500974°N 0.119882°W	United Kingdom
SIS Building	Same	51.487382°N 0.124428°W	United Kingdom
Graves' Ice palace	Bourton-on-the-Water, Cotswolds, England	52.074618°N 1.749421°W	Iceland
Biodomes near the palace	Eden Project, Cornwall	50.360257°N 4.744631°W	Iceland
Ice chase on glacier	Jökulsárlón, near Höfn	64.073912°N 16.235720°W	Iceland
US Air Base, South Korea	RAF Odiham, Hampshire	51.241946°N 0.945420°W	South Korea
Buddhist temple, South Korea	Penbryn, Wales	52.144703°N 4.498997°W	South Korea
Casino Royale (2006)
Prague (kill #1)	Danube House, Karolinská 650, Prague	50.096102°N 14.443154°E	Czech Republic
Lahore (kill # 2)			Pakistan
Ugandan rebel camp, Mbale	Black Park County Park, Wexham, Buckinghamshire	51.541694°N 0.552381°W	Uganda
Construction site	near Coral Harbour, New Providence Island	24.981250°N 77.471768°W	Madagascar
Nambutu Embassy	John Watling's Distillery	25.074899°N 77.348870°W	Madagascar
Albany House, Nassau (Bond emerges from the sea and Bond meets Solange)	Same	25.001645°N 77.509104°W	Bahamas
One and Only Ocean Club, Paradise Island	Same	25.082674°N 77.310434°W	Bahamas
MI6 headquarters and M's home in London			United Kingdom
Miami Body Worlds	Ext: Ministry of Transport (Czech Republic) Int: National Monument at Vítkov	50.093612°N 14.434360°E 50.088400°N 14.449536°E	United States
Miami International Airport	terminal: Václav Havel Airport Prague Runways: Dunsfold Aerodrome, UK	50.102473°N 14.263293°E 51.120747°N 0.533753°W	United States
On the train to Royale	Pendolino train, shown just outside the city of Ústí nad Orlicí, Czech Republic	49.978207°N 16.334484°E	Serbia and Montenegro (now Montenegro)
Royale train station	Mill Colonnade, Karlovy Vary	50.225585°N 12.881845°E	Serbia and Montenegro (now Montenegro)
Hotel Splendide, Montenegro	Grandhotel Pupp, Carlsbad, Czech Republic	50.219900°N 12.878553°E	Serbia and Montenegro (now Montenegro)
Town square	Loket, Czech Republic	50.185969°N 12.754052°E	Serbia and Montenegro (now Montenegro)
Casino Royale, Montenegro	Kaiserbad Spa, Karlovy Vary	50.219456°N 12.881529°E	Serbia and Montenegro (now Montenegro)
Villa Balbianello Lake Como (Bond recovers)	Same	46.965493°N 9.202481°E	Italy
Grand Canal, Venice	Same	45.435809°N 12.328034°E	Italy
Bond & Vesper's hotel	Lobby interior: National Museum (Prague)	50.079629°N 14.430893°E	Italy
The collapsing palazzo, across from Campo Erberia and the Rialto Bridge	Same	45.439255°N 12.336264°E	Italy
Mr. White's Mansion	Villa La Gaeta Lake Como	46.040857°N 9.250983°E	Italy
Quantum of Solace (2008)
Car chase along the shores of Lake Garda, Italy	Same	45.594503°N 10.695148°E	Italy
Piazza del Campo, Siena during the Palio di Siena	Same	43.3187131°N 11.331691°E	Italy
Mitchell's apartment, London	The Water Gdns complex, Tyburnia	51.517202°N 0.168096°W	United Kingdom
Port-au-Prince, Haiti harbor	Colón, Panama port	9.363976°N 79.910747°W	Haiti
MI6 headquarters in central London	Barbican Centre, London	51.520361°N 0.093807°W	United Kingdom
Bregenzer Festspiele opera stage, Bregenz, Austria	Same	47.504756°N 9.737931°E	Austria
Rene Mathis' villa	Tower of Talamonaccio, Talamone	42.551093°N 11.165051°E	Italy
Andean Grand Hotel, La Paz, Bolivia	National Institute of Culture, Panama City, Panama	8.988462°N 79.523264°W	Bolivia
Greene's Eco-fundraiser	Union Club, Panama (Club de Clases y Tropas)	8.975626°N 79.510260°W	Bolivia
aerial dogfight scenes	San Felipe International Airport, Baja California, Mexico	31.802330°N 114.926893°W	Bolivia
Bolivian village	Sierra Gorda, Chile	22.890907°S 69.319865°W	Bolivia
Bolivian desert	Atacama Desert, Chile	23.862082°S 69.132162°W	Bolivia
Perla de las Dunas hotel	ESO Hotel, Chile	24.640165°S 70.388185°W	Bolivia
Kazan, Russia (Bond warns Corrine)	Same		Russia
Skyfall (2012)
Eminönü and Grand Bazaar, Istanbul	Same	41.010870°N 28.968089°E	Turkey
Bridge over ravine	Varda Viaduct	37.243113°N 34.976774°E	Turkey
M's meeting with Mallory at Trinity Square Gardens, Tower Hill	Same	51.509955°N 0.077636°W	United Kingdom
SIS Building	Same	51.487421°N 0.124397°W	United Kingdom
MI6 funerals at Old Royal Naval College	Same	51.483044°N 0.006567°W	United Kingdom
Aegean coast	Çalış Beach, Fethiye	36.673604°N 29.102712°E	Turkey
M's home, 82 Cadogan Square	Same	51.494233°N 0.160941°W	United Kingdom
MI6 temporary quarters near Waterloo Station	The Old Vic Tunnels	51.502323°N 0.109357°W	United Kingdom
National Gallery, London	Same	51.509042°N 0.128309°W	United Kingdom
Bond's hotel pool, Shanghai	Virgin Active Health Club, Canary Wharf, London	51.506568°N 0.028519°W	China
Century Avenue, Pudong, Shanghai	Same	31.231364°N 121.525391°E	China
Patrice's skyscraper, Shanghai	Broadgate Tower, London	51.521307°N 0.079357°W	China
Macao casino		22.201868°N 113.546457°E	Macao
Abandoned Island off Macao	Wide shots and inspiration:Hashima Island, Japan on location Close ups and digital inserts of actors: Pinewood Studios, UK [14]	32.627351°N 129.737689°E (Real life inspiration in Japan)	Macao
British parliament	Same	51.570845°N 0.105044°W	United Kingdom
London Underground chase, including Temple Station, Embankment, and Westminster Station	Charing Cross Underground, Jubilee Line (disused platforms)		United Kingdom
Bond's Aston Martin hideaway, Arklow Road	Same	51.481709°N 0.033987°W	United Kingdom
Glen Coe (arrival in Scotland)	Same	56.661699°N 5.069103°W	United Kingdom
Skyfall estate	Scotland (various locations) and Hankley Common, Surrey	51.164942°N 0.734225°W	United Kingdom
Final rooftop scene	Department of Energy and Climate Change	51.506147°N 0.126048°W	United Kingdom
Spectre (2015)
Zócalo Square, Mexico City	Same	19.432796°N 99.133276°W	Mexico
Gran Hotel Ciudad de Mexico	Same	19.432227°N 99.134636°W	Mexico
MI6 Headquarters, London	HM Treasury, London	51.501942°N 0.129215°W	United Kingdom
Bond's flat	1 Stanley Gardens, Notting Hill, London	51.512640°N 0.204293°W	United Kingdom
Sciarra's funeral, Rome	Museum of Roman Civilization	41.831519°N 12.478537°E	Italy
Sciarra villa	Villa Alberco, via Appia Antica, 400, Rome	41.799261°N 12.576082°E	Italy
Palazzo Cadenza (Spectre meeting)	Blenheim Palace (exterior)	51.841524°N 1.360993°W	Italy
St. Peter's Square	Same	41.902294°N 12.457269°E	Vatican City
The banks of the Tiber River and Ponte Sisto	Same	41.896122°N 12.465009°E 41.892496°N 12.470706°E	Italy
Lake Altaussee, Austria	Same	47.639969°N 13.784791°E	Austria
Hoffler Klinik	Das Central Hotel, Sölden	46.967072°N 11.008786°E	Austria
End of snow chase	Obertilliach	46.708715°N 12.611970°E	Austria
Tangier		35.763803°N 5.837907°W	Morocco
Oriental Desert Express	Same, between Oujda and Bouarfa, Morocco		Morocco
Gara Medouar Crater near Rissani	Facility digitally inserted by CGI	31.306018°N 4.399037°W	Morocco
Westminster Bridge, London	Same	51.500997°N 0.121964°W	United Kingdom
No Time to Die (2021)
Swann's childhood home & adjacent frozen lake	Oslo & Nittedal, Norway		Norway
Swann & Bond in Italy (boat and beach scenes)	Matera & Maratea, Italy		Italy
Swann & Bond in Italy (bridge attack and car chase)	Gravina in Puglia & Piazza San Pietro Caveoso, Matera, Italy		Italy
MI6 lab (Obruchev's kidnapping)	London		United Kingdom
Jamaica (Bond in retirement)	Port Antonio		Jamaica
SPECTRE party	Santiago de Cuba		Cuba
Bond interrogates Blofeld	HM Prison Belmarsh, London		United Kingdom
Swann's childhood home	Oslo & Nittedal, Norway		Norway
Bond, Swann, and Mathilde attempt to escape	Atlantic Ocean Road		Norway
Car chase through the woods	Highland, Scotland, United Kingdom		Norway
Ørland Main Air Station	RAF Brize Norton, Oxfordshire, England, United Kingdom		Norway
Kuril Islands	Kalsoy, Faroe Islands		Disputed territory between Russia and Japan
MI6	London		United Kingdom

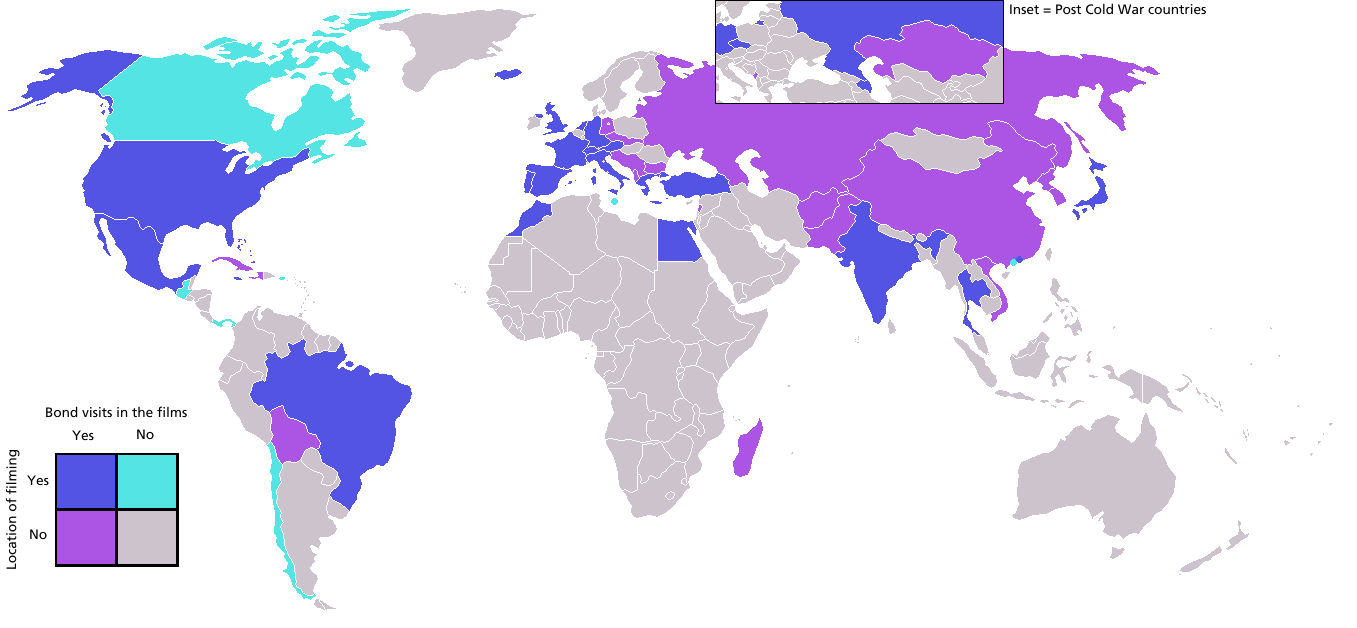
Story and filming locations of the Bond films until 2008

With You Only Live Twice and Licence to Kill being notable exceptions, James Bond is almost always seen at the HQ of MI6 (referred to as MI7 in Dr. No) in central London. This has been the actual headquarters of MI6: the Vauxhall Cross building on the Thames from GoldenEye (1995) onwards. Before that it was an undistinguished building near Whitehall, sometimes (Dr. No, On Her Majesty's Secret Service, The Living Daylights) ostensibly the HQ of Universal Exports, the Secret Service's front company.

== See also ==
- Outline of James Bond
- List of Mission: Impossible film locations
