= Khao Phing Kan =

Island in Phang Nga Bay, Thailand

Native name: เขาพิงกัน
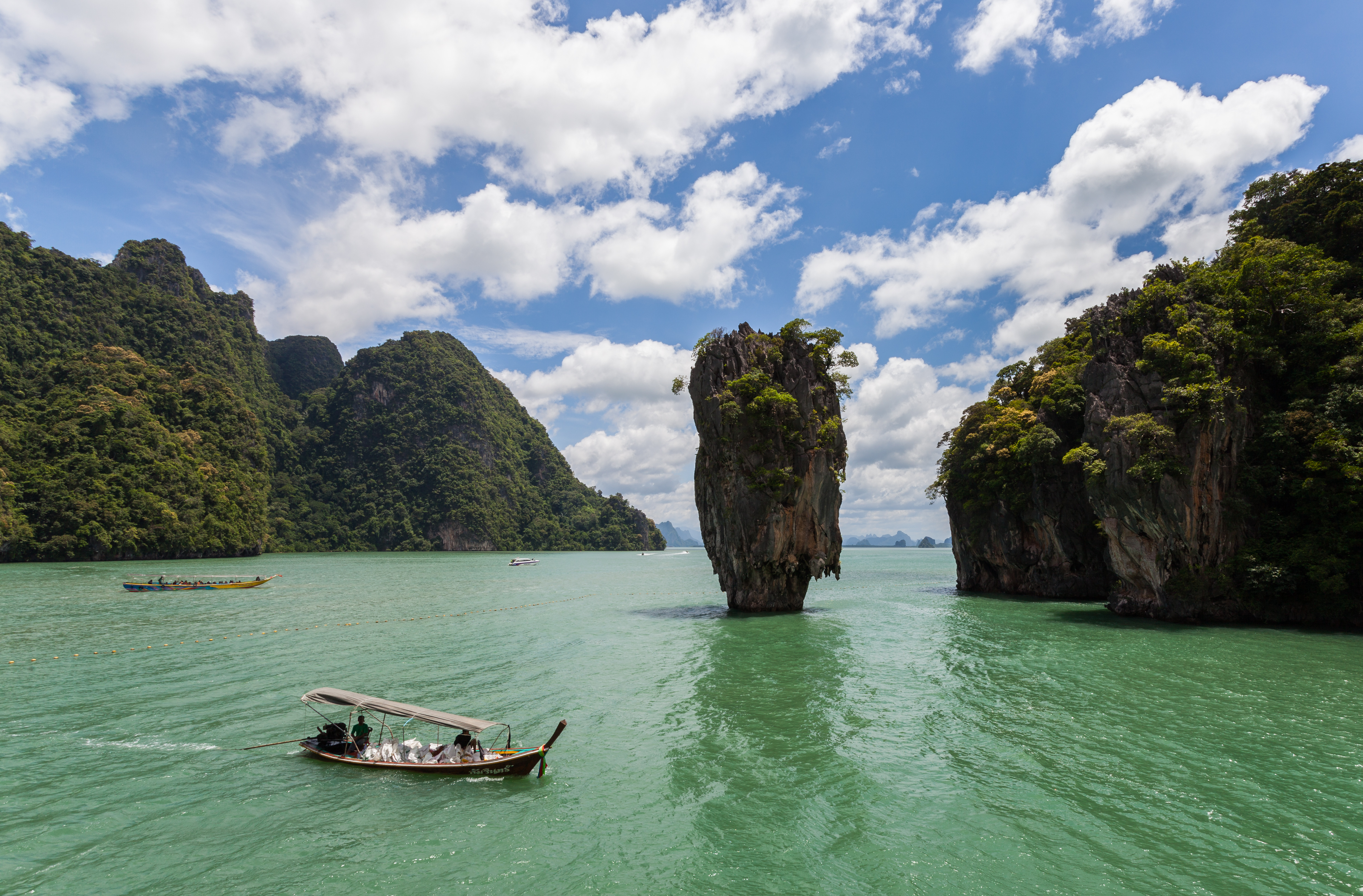
- Khao Phing Kan (right) and Ko Ta Pu (centre). Ko Raya Ring at left.

- Location within Thailand

Geography
- Location: Southeast Asia
- Coordinates: 8°16′28″N 98°30′3″E

Administration
- Thailand

Khao Phing Kan (Thai: เขาพิงกัน, pronounced [kʰǎw pʰīŋ kān]) or Ko Khao Phing Kan (เกาะเขาพิงกัน, [kɔ̀ʔ kʰǎw pʰīŋ kān]), commonly known in English as James Bond Island, is an island in Thailand, in Phang Nga Bay northeast of Phuket. About 40 metres (130 ft) from the shores of Khao Phing Kan lies a 20-metre (66 ft) tall islet called Ko Ta Pu (เกาะตาปู, [kɔ̀ʔ tāː pūː]) or Ko Tapu (เกาะตะปู, [kɔ̀ʔ tā.pūː]).

The islands are limestone karst towers and are a part of Ao Phang Nga National Park. Since 1974, when they were featured in the James Bond movie The Man with the Golden Gun, Khao Phing Kan and Ko Ta Pu – both separately and collectively – have been popularly called James Bond Island.

== Etymology ==
Khao Phing Kan means "hills leaning against each other" in Thai, reflecting the connected nature of the islands. Khao Ta Pu can be literally translated as "crab's eye" island, and Ko Tapu can be translated as "nail" or "spike" island, reflecting its shape. With koh (Thai: เกาะ) meaning "island" and khao (Thai: เขา) meaning "hill", the terms ko, khao, and Ko Khao are frequently interchanged in the naming of the islands. After appearing in the 1974 James Bond movie The Man with the Golden Gun, Khao Phing Kan and sometimes Ko Ta Pu became widely referred to as James Bond Island, especially in tourist guides, and their original names are rarely used by locals.

== History ==
Before 1974, the island, now known as Khao Phing Kan, was relatively undisturbed and predominantly inhabited by indigenous communities. Its international recognition escalated following its selection as a filming location for the 1974 James Bond film, The Man with the Golden Gun. The island served as the backdrop for the hideout of the film's antagonist, Francisco Scaramanga. After the film's release, Khao Phing Kan experienced a significant surge in tourism, transforming it into a renowned tourist destination.

The increased popularity of Khao Phing Kan, however, brought challenges, including a notable increase in litter and environmental impact. In response to these concerns, and to preserve the natural environment, the island was incorporated into the Ao Phang Nga Marine National Park, established in 1981. Since 1998, in an effort to protect the fragile limestone formations of the nearby islet Ko Ta Pu, regulations prohibit tourist boats from approaching too closely. This measure is intended to prevent erosion that could jeopardize the structural integrity of the limestone formations and ultimately lead to the island's collapse.

== Geography ==
=== Khao Phing Kan ===
Khao Phing Kan comprises two forest-covered islands characterized by steep shores. Located in the northwestern part of Phang Nga Bay, the islands are situated approximately 6 kilometres (3.7 mi) from the mainland. They are part of a larger group of about a dozen islands. The western part of Khao Phing Kan measures around 130 metres (430 ft) in diameter, while the eastern part extends about 240 metres (790 ft) in length and 140 metres (460 ft) in width, stretching predominantly northwards.

The island features several caves and two main sandy beaches. The southwest beach houses a government office where visitors are required to pay a tax. The beach between the twin islands serves as the arrival point for tourist boats from the mainland. It includes various souvenir shops selling items such as coral, shells, and plastic-encased natural specimens, such as butterflies, scorpions, and spiders. Both the beaches and caves on Khao Phing Kan are subject to regular flooding due to tides, which have an amplitude of 2–3 metres (6.6–9.8 ft), making some caves accessible only during low tide.

The name 'Khao Phing Kan' in Thai linguistically reflects the island's distinctive shape, resembling a flat limestone cliff that appears to have collapsed sideways, leaning against a similar rock at the island's center.

Surrounding the island, the waters are shallow, typically only a few metres deep, and exhibit a pale-green hue. The seabed in this area is covered with silt, which is predominantly carried into Phang Nga Bay by rivers flowing from the north.

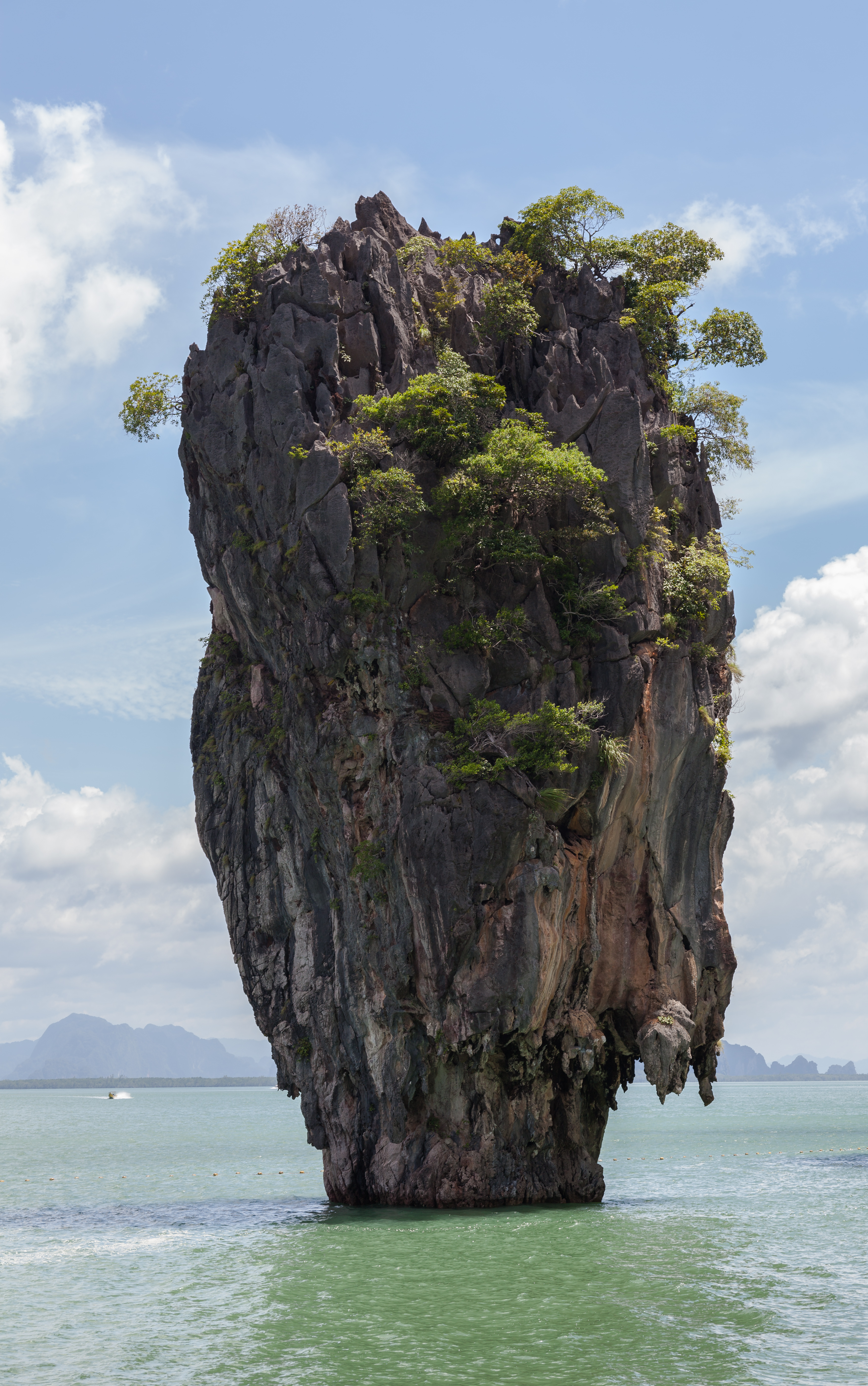
Ko Ta Pu

=== Ko Ta Pu ===
Ko Ta Pu is a limestone rock formation approximately 20 metres (66 ft) in height, situated around 40 metres (130 ft) west of the northern part of Khao Phing Kan at 8°16′31.4″N 98°30′2.1″E. The rock's diameter expands from about 4 metres (13 ft) at water level to approximately 8 metres (26 ft) at its top.

Local folklore presents an imaginative explanation for Ko Ta Pu's formation. According to this legend, a fisherman, habitually successful in his catches, once found himself unable to catch any fish. Instead, he repeatedly caught a nail with his net. In frustration, he sliced the nail in half with his sword, causing one half to leap into the sea and become Ko Ta Pu.

In contrast, the geological explanation for the formation of Ko Ta Pu suggests that the area was part of a barrier reef during the Permian period. Subsequent tectonic movements caused ruptures, dispersing parts of the reef across the region, which were later submerged by rising ocean levels. Over time, natural elements such as wind, waves, currents, and tides have eroded these limestone formations, creating distinctive shapes, including Ko Ta Pu. Erosion due to tides is particularly noticeable at the base of the rock.

Ko Ta Pu gained prominence in popular culture through its depiction in the James Bond film, The Man with the Golden Gun, where it was described as a 'mushroom-shaped rock' housing solar panels by Francisco Scaramanga. It also appeared in another James Bond movie, Tomorrow Never Dies (identified as being in Vietnam), and in the Italian film Quo Vado? (identified as in the Philippines).

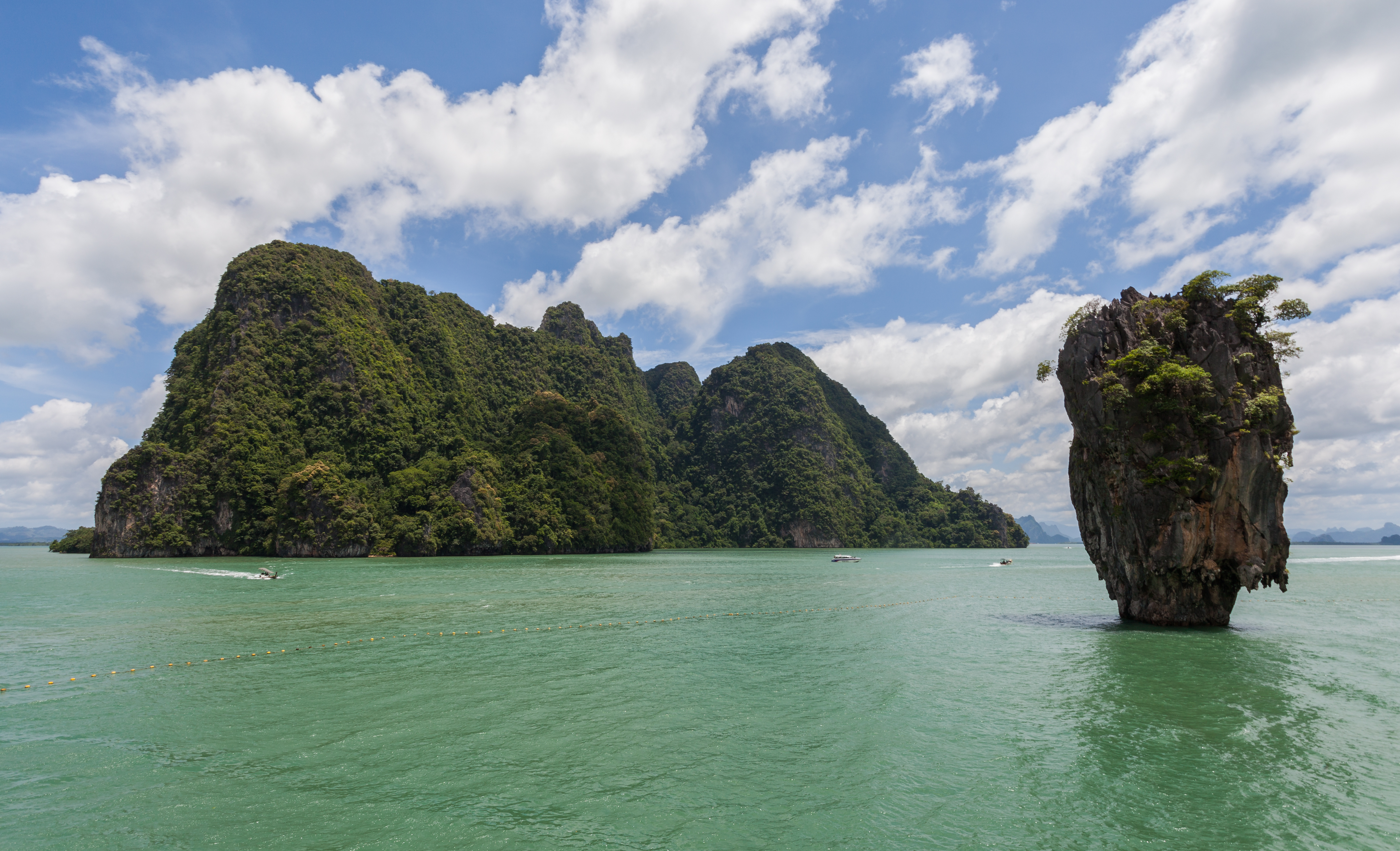
Ko Raya Ring and Ko Ta Pu

== Climate ==
The area is characterized by a tropical monsoon climate, marked by frequent rainfall and relatively stable temperatures. Meteorological data recorded between 1961 and 1990 indicate that the area experiences an average of 189 rainy days per year. This results in a total annual precipitation of approximately 3,560.5 millimetres (140.18 in), with the majority occurring between May and October. Temperature fluctuations in the area are typically moderate, ranging between 23 °C (73 °F) and 32 °C (90 °F). Additionally, the average relative humidity in this region is reported to be around 83%.

== Flora and fauna ==
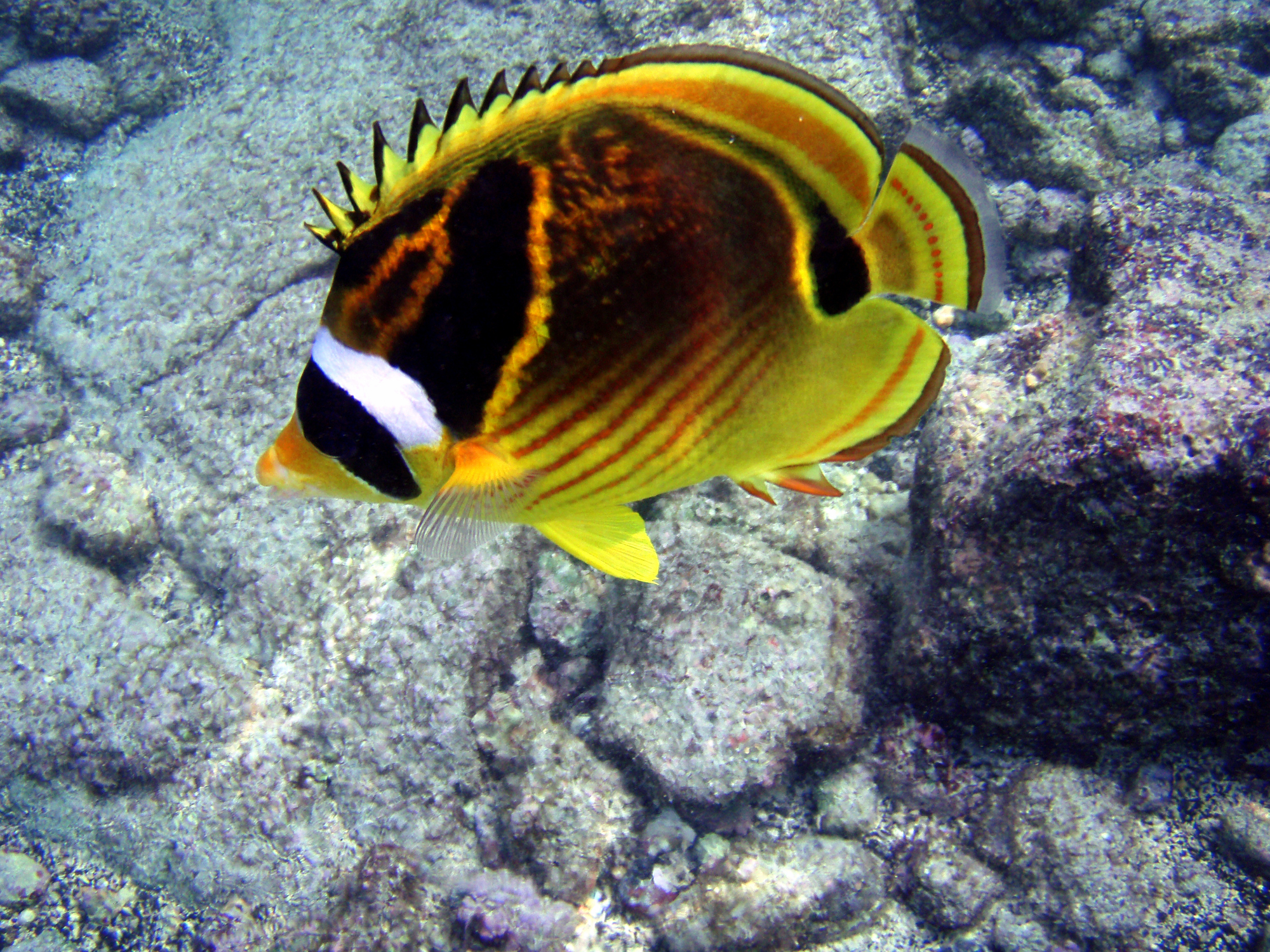
Butterflyfish

Most of the island is covered with deciduous limestone shrubland and evergreen trees. Some plants, such as Pandanus, cycads, and euphorbs grow on nearly soil-free cliffs, such as those of Ko Ta Pu, penetrating their roots into the numerous cracks and surviving on rainwater.

Shallow water depth, warm, stable temperature, and rich nutrient supply from mangrove forests and several rivers running into Phang Nga Bay result in abundant plankton and other marine life. The bay island hosts 26 species of reptiles, 24 species of fish, 14 species of shrimp, 15 species of crab, and 16 species of manta rays, sharks, and game fish. Most fish are typical of coral reefs, such as butterflyfish. Other common inhabitants are blue crab, swimming crab, mudskipper, humpback shrimp, mud lobster, pomfret, sole, anchovy, scad, rock cod, rainbow cuttlefish, soft cuttlefish, musk crab, mackerel, moray eel, puffer fish, rabbitfish, groupers, black sea cucumber, brain coral, staghorn coral and flowerlike soft coral. Amphibians include Fejervarya raja, cricket frog (Fejervarya limnocharis) and the common tree frog. Aquatic plants are represented by red algae, Halimeda, seagrass, and plant plankton. There are more than 100 species of birds in the area, such as the striated heron, Pacific reef heron, little egret, and others.

== See also ==
- List of islands of Thailand
- List of James Bond film locations
- James Bond Beach
