= Ao Phang Nga National Park =

National park in southern Thailand

- IUCN category II (national park)
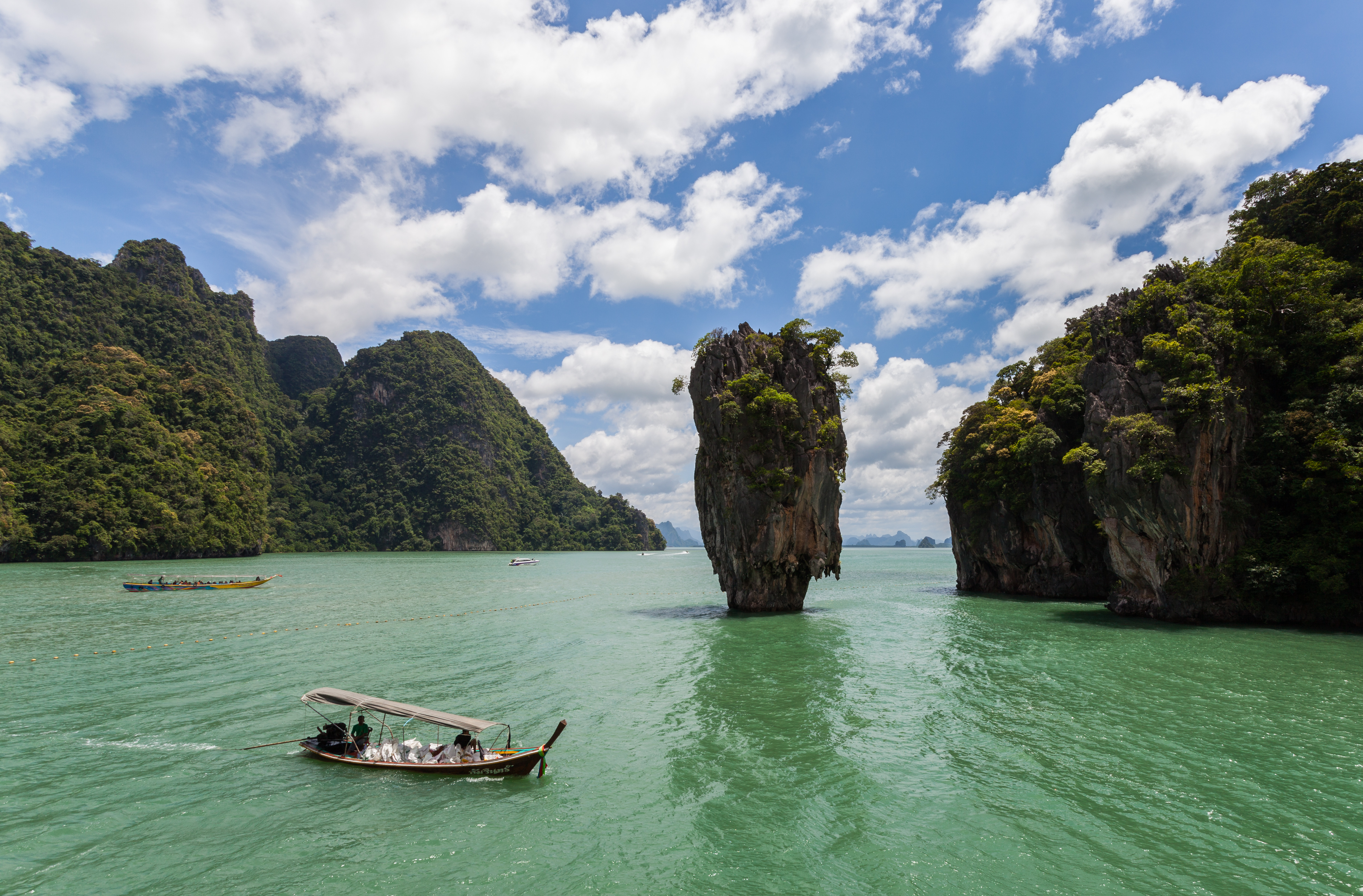
- Ao Phang Nga National Park
- Interactive map of Ao Phang Nga National Park
- Location: Phang Nga Province, Thailand
- Nearest city: Phang Nga
- Coordinates: 8°21′0″N 98°29′0″E
- Area: 400 km^{2} (150 sq mi)
- Established: 29 April 1981
- Visitors: 999,035 (in 2019)
- Governing body: Department of National Park, Wildlife and Plant Conservation (DNP)

Ramsar Wetland
- Official name: Phang Nga Bay Marine National Park
- Designated: 14 August 2002
- Reference no.: 1185

Ao Phang Nga National Park (Thai: อุทยานแห่งชาติอ่าวพังงา), located in the Phang Nga Province of the Southern Thailand, encompasses parts of Mueang Phang Nga District and Takua Thung District. The park is predominantly maritime, featuring a section of the Strait of Malacca dotted with numerous limestone tower karst islands. Among these islands, Khao Phing Kan stands out as particularly well-known, having gained the nickname "James Bond Island" due to its use as a filming location for the James Bond film The Man with the Golden Gun.

The park's landscape is characterized by its islands, which have steep, sheer sides. This topography has contributed to the area becoming a sought-after tourist destination.

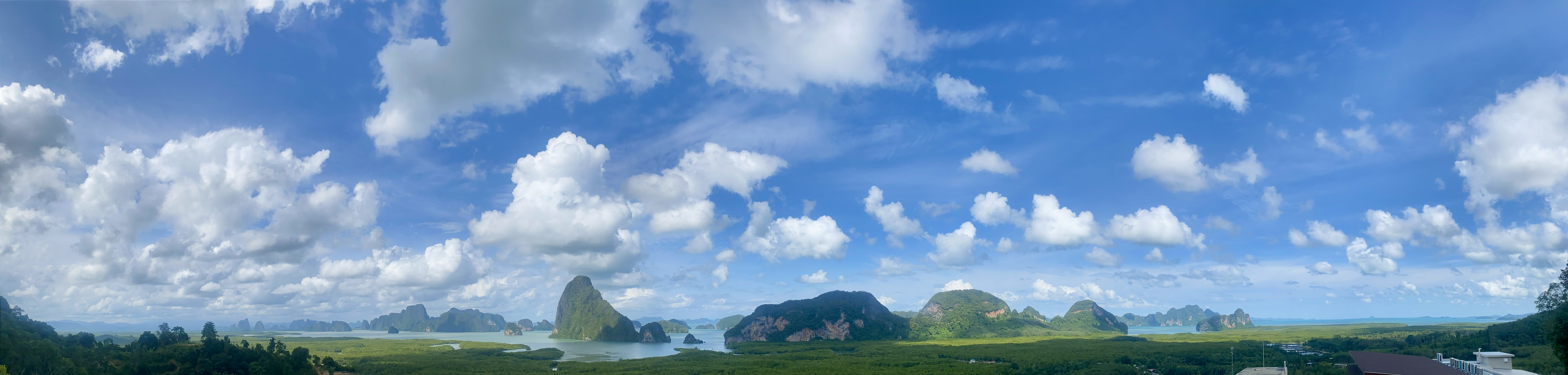
View of the bay from Sametnangshe

In addition to its geological features, Ao Phang Nga National Park is significant for its environmental conservation efforts. It is recognized for protecting the largest expanse of native mangrove forest remaining in Thailand.

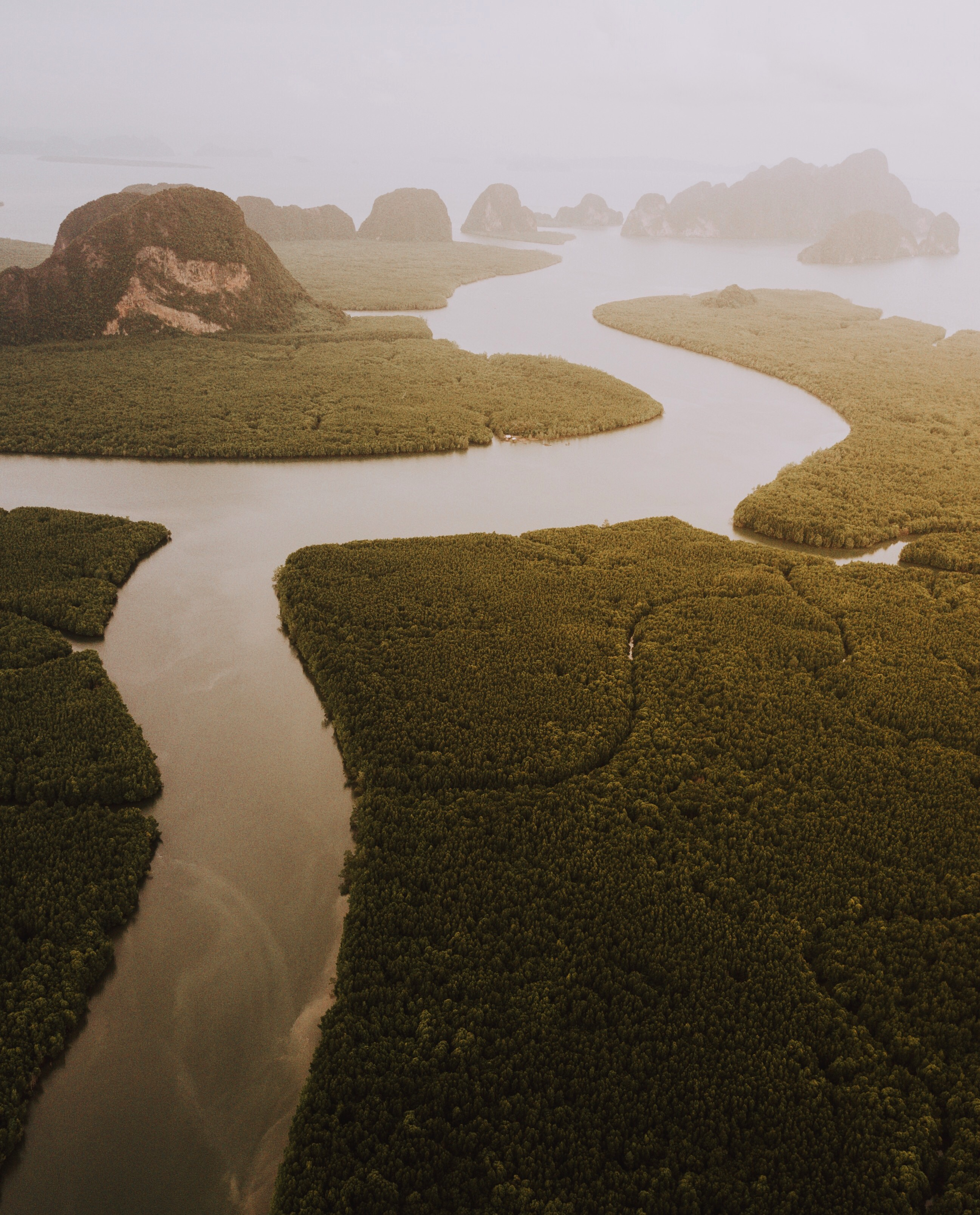
Rivers and mangrove forest at sunset

== History ==
Ao Phang Nga National Park was established by a royal decree, as documented in the Royal Gazette under proclamation number 98, section 64, dated 29 April 1981. The park spans an area of 250,000 rai (400 km^{2}; 150 sq mi).

== Environment ==
In response to the environmental impacts of mass tourism, Fodor's Travel included Ao Phang Nga National Park in their "No List" for 2018. This inclusion was part of a recommendation for tourists to temporarily avoid visiting the park. The intent behind this recommendation was to facilitate environmental recovery and mitigate the effects of over-tourism, which was described as "loving the park to death".

== Geology ==
The mountain range within the region, according to geological studies, is believed to have originated in the period spanning from the Cretaceous to the early Tertiary, approximately 136 to 36 million years ago. This formation is attributed to structural geological features, notably faults, including the "Khlong Marui fault" and "Phang Nga fault". The region also exhibits a combination of sedimentary and metamorphic rock formations, particularly evident in the limestone mountains. Over time, these geological changes have led to the formation of numerous caves and holes in the natural landscape.

In 1987, archaeological research at Khao Tao within the Phang Nga Bay National Park uncovered prehistoric human burial sites, providing evidence of early human habitation in the area. Further studies, including the examination of shell fossils in caves and on islands within Phang Nga Bay, indicate significant fluctuations in sea levels. During the Pleistocene and early Holocene epochs, around 11,000 years ago, sea levels were considerably lower due to the Ice Age. The current islands, mostly upland rocky mountains at that time, witnessed a gradual rise in sea level around 7,500 to 8,500 years ago, reaching approximately 4.5 meters above the present level. Subsequent fluctuations occurred, with sea levels rising and falling interchangeably around 4,000 to 5,000 years ago. Approximately 2,700 to 3,700 years ago, the sea level stabilized but remained 1.5 to 2.5 meters higher than today. Around 1,500 years ago, the sea level was about 1.5 meters higher than current levels.

== Flora and fauna ==
Ao Phang-nga National Park is home to one of Thailand's largest and most well-preserved mangrove forests. This ecosystem plays a crucial role in the coastal environment, serving as a natural barrier against storms and as a vital breeding ground for various marine species.

The mangrove forest in Ao Phang-nga is characterized by a diverse range of plant species. Notable among these are Rhizophora apiculata, Rhizophora mucronata, Avicennia alba, Avicennia officinalis, Bruguiera cylindrica, Bruguiera parviflora, and the cannonball trees Xylocarpus granatum and Xylocarpus moluccensis. Beyond the mangroves, the park's islands support tropical rainforests with species such as Hopea ferrea, the pea plant Parkia timoriana, and Acacia catechu, the mulberry tree Artocarpus lacucha, the Clusia tree Garcinia cowa and Morinda coreia, and on more calcareous soil Leucocasia gigantea, Pandanus monotheca, and Cycas ingas.

A 1991 inventory of the park's wildlife identified 206 species, including 17 mammal species, 88 bird species, 18 reptile species, 3 amphibian species, 24 fish species, and 45 other marine animals. Notably, the lar gibbon and serow once found in the area, are now extinct in the region.

Among the endangered mammal species in Ao Phang-nga are the smooth-coated otter, leaf monkeys, smoky leaf monkeys, and the crab-eating macaque. Birdlife in the park includes the brahminy kite, Pacific reef heron, white-bellied sea eagle, various species of kingfishers, the Asian dowitcher, and the edible-nest swiftlet.

Reptiles and amphibians, such as mangroves snakes, rhacophoridae frogs, and saltwater frogs, are also present in this diverse habitat.

== Location ==
Ao Phang Nga National Park in overview PARO 5 (Nakhon Si Thammarat)

1) Ao Phang Nga National Park in overview PARO 5

	National park
1	Ao Phang Nga
2	Hat Chao Mai
3	Hat Khanom-Mu Ko Thale Tai
4	Hat Noppharat Thara– Mu Ko Phi Phi
5	Khao Lak–Lam Ru
6	Khao Lampi–Hat Thai Mueang
7	Khao Luang
8	Khao Nan
9	Khao Phanom Bencha
10	Mu Ko Lanta
11	Mu Ko Phetra
12	Mu Ko Similan
13	Mu Ko Surin
14	Namtok Si Khit
15	Namtok Yong
16	Si Phang Nga
17	Sirinat
18	Tarutao
19	Thale Ban
20	Than Bok Khorani

	Wildlife sanctuary
21	Kathun
22	Khao Pra–Bang Khram
23	Khlong Phraya
24	Namtok Song Phraek

	Non-hunting area
25	Bo Lo
26	Khao Nam Phrai
27	Khao Phra Thaeo
28	Khao Pra–Bang Khram
29	Khlong Lam Chan
30	Laem Talumpuk
31	Ko Libong
32	Nong Plak Phraya– Khao Raya Bangsa
33	Thung Thale
	Forest park
34	Bo Namrong Kantang
35	Namtok Phan
36	Namtok Raman
37	Namtok Thara Sawan
38	Sa Nang Manora

== See also ==
- List of national parks of Thailand
- List of Protected Areas Regional Offices of Thailand
