= Phang Nga Bay =

Bay in southern Thailand

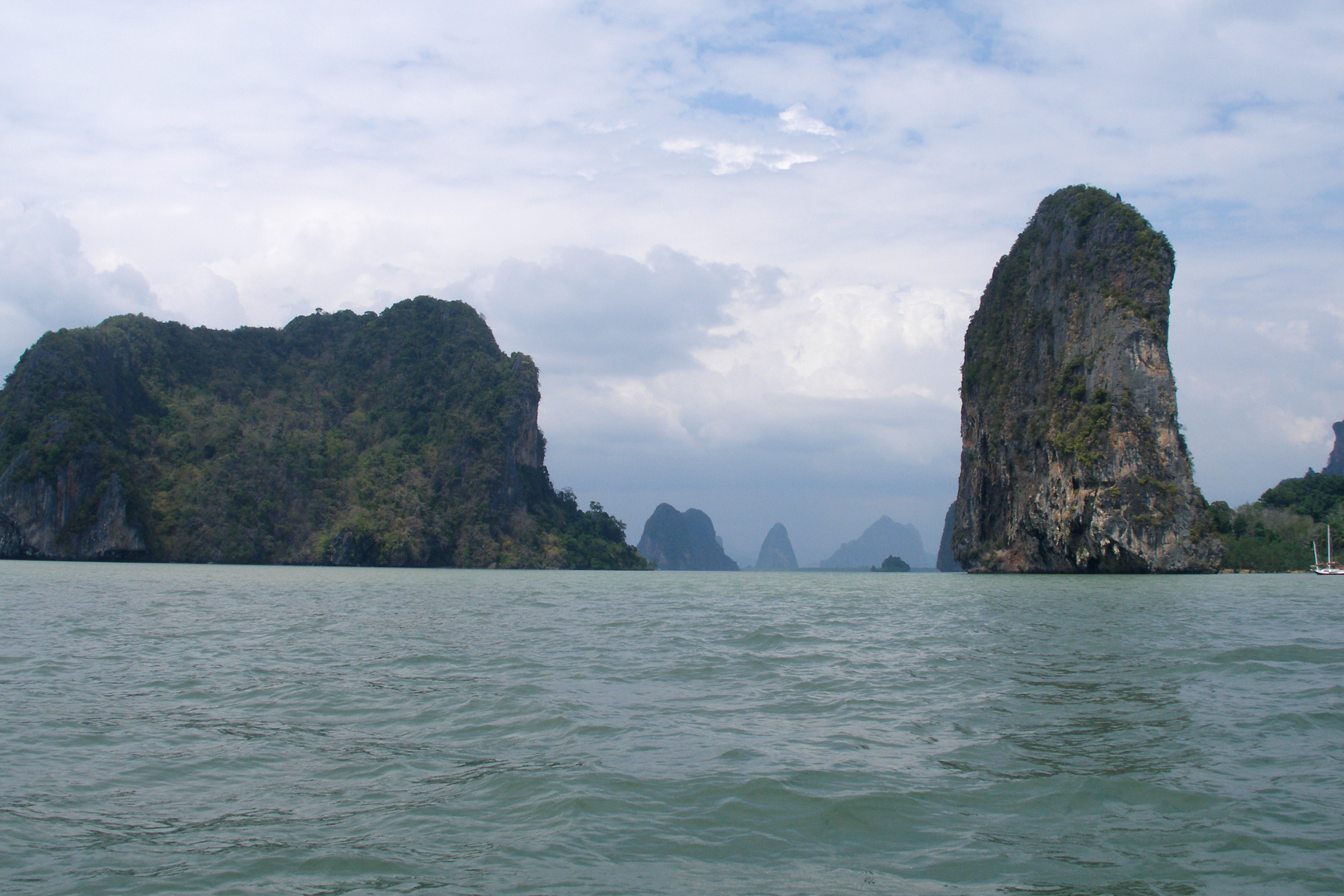
Islets in Phang Nga Bay

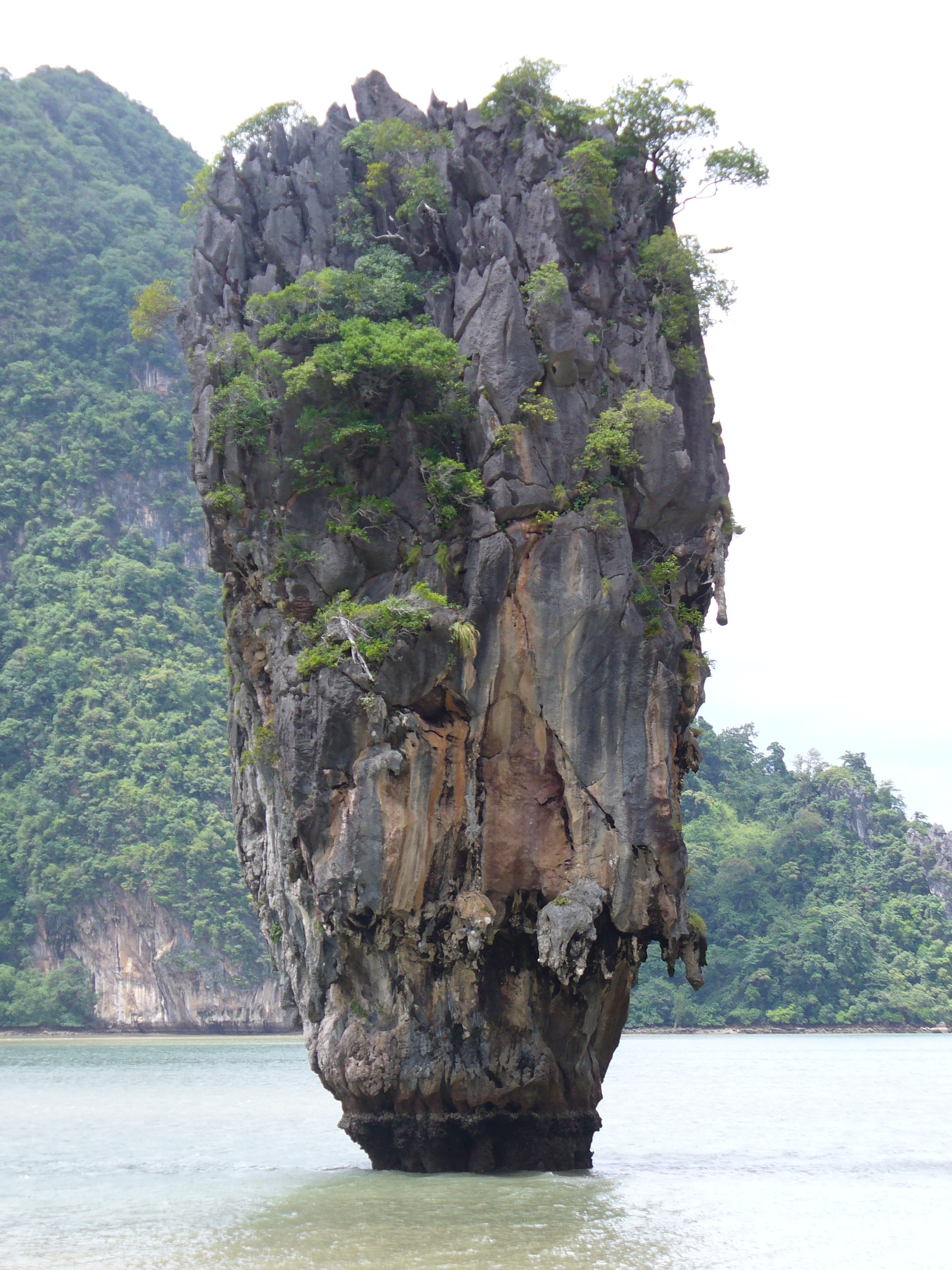
Ko Tapu, also known as James Bond Island, Phang Nga Bay

Phang Nga Bay (Thai: อ่าวพังงา, RTGS: ao phangnga [ʔàːw pʰāŋ.ŋāː]) is a 400 km^{2} (150 sq mi) bay in the Andaman Sea between the island of Phuket and the mainland of the Kra Isthmus of southern Thailand. Since 1981, an extensive section of the bay has been protected as the Ao Phang Nga National Park. The park is in Phang Nga Province, at 8°17′N 98°36′E.

Limestone cliffs with caves, collapsed cave systems, and archaeological sites are found about Phang Nga Bay. Around 10,000 years ago, when sea levels were lower, it was possible to walk from Phuket to Krabi.

== Etymology and history ==
Phang Nga is the modern Thai transliteration of the Malay word pangan, literally 'heathen, pagan, primitive people,' or as proper noun, Pangan in reference to a generalised tribe or people typically inhabiting jungle areas of the Malay Peninsula and its offshore islands. Historically, in 1824 when Siamese troops defeated the Burmese and the challengers were expelled, King Rama III renamed a major area adjacent to the bay phang-nga. This bastardisation of Malay pangan offers vivid indication that the entire region was likely populated by Orang Asli or other aboriginal people.

== Ramsar site ==
Phang Nga Bay Marine National Park was declared a protected Ramsar Site (no. 1185) of international ecological significance on 14 August 2002. Phang Nga is a shallow bay with 42 islands, comprising shallow marine waters and intertidal forested wetlands, with at least 28 species of mangrove; seagrass beds and coral reefs are also present.

At least 88 bird species, including the globally threatened Malaysian plover (Charadrius peronii) and Asiatic dowitcher (Limnodromus semipalmatus), can be found within the site, as well as 82 fish species, 18 reptiles, three amphibians, and 17 mammal species. These include the dugong (a vulnerable species), white-hand gibbon (Hylobates lar), the endangered serow (Capricornis sumatraensis), and the black finless porpoise (Neophocaena phocaenoides).

A number of diverse cultures co-exist in local communities, which practice fishing, harvesting Nypa palm fronds for thatch, and catering to an international tourist presence drawn both by the natural beauties and by the archaeological sites, which have paintings more than a thousand years old.

== In pop culture ==
The most famous of the many islands in the bay may be the pair of Khao Phing Kan and Ko Ta Pu, the so-called James Bond Island; in the 1974 film The Man with the Golden Gun, Khao Phing Kan is the home base of the villain, with the needle formed limestone rock of Ko Ta Pu, 20 metres (22 yd) off the main beach, featured prominently. Ko Ta Pu also featured in the 1997 Bond film Tomorrow Never Dies, in which Phang Nga Bay served as a stand-in for Ha Long Bay in Vietnam. Nearby villages include Ao Luk.

In Star Wars: Episode III – Revenge of the Sith, the bay was used as main photography for the planet Kashyyyk, the home of the Wookiees, including Chewbacca.

== Gallery ==
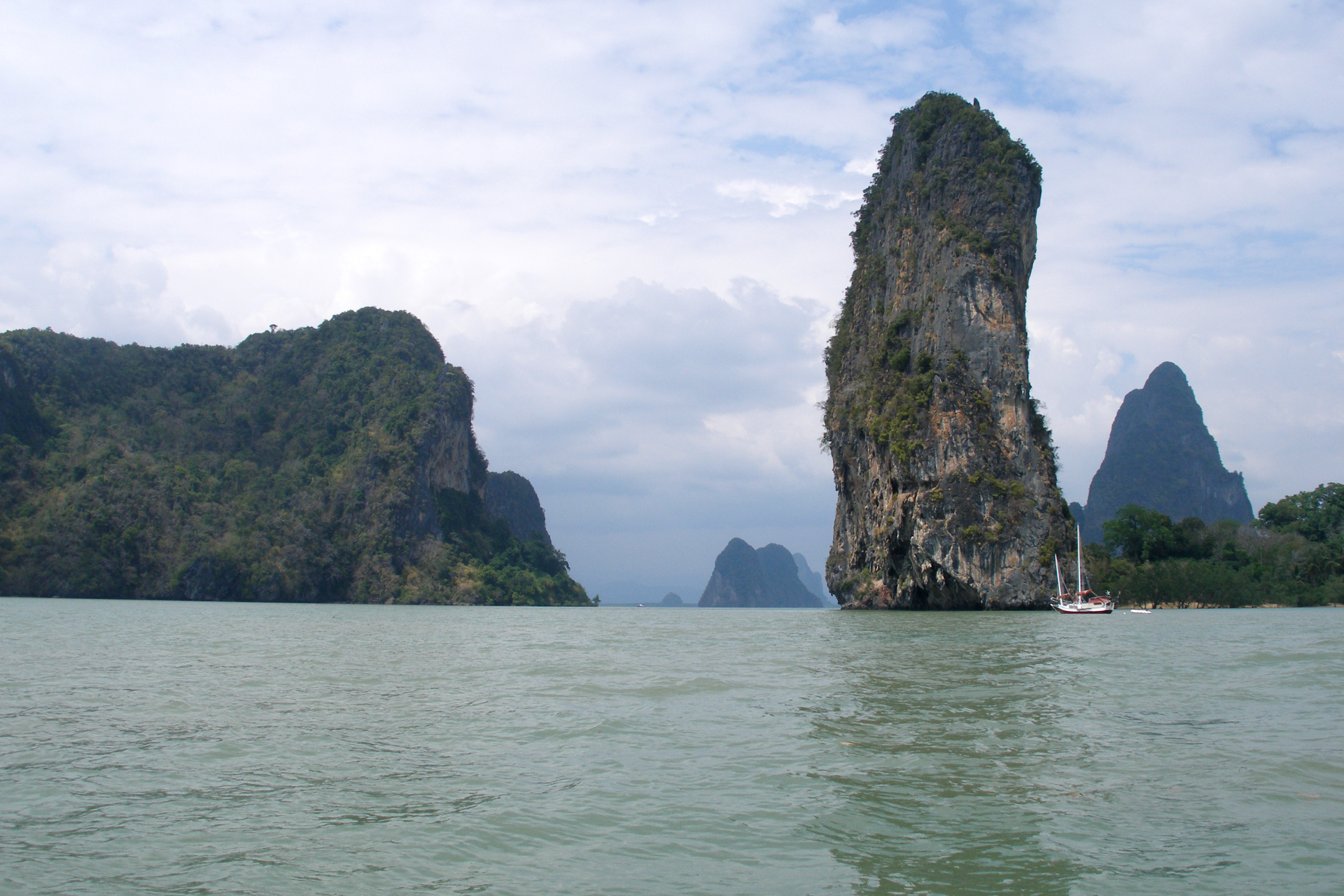
Karst landscape, Phang Nga Bay.

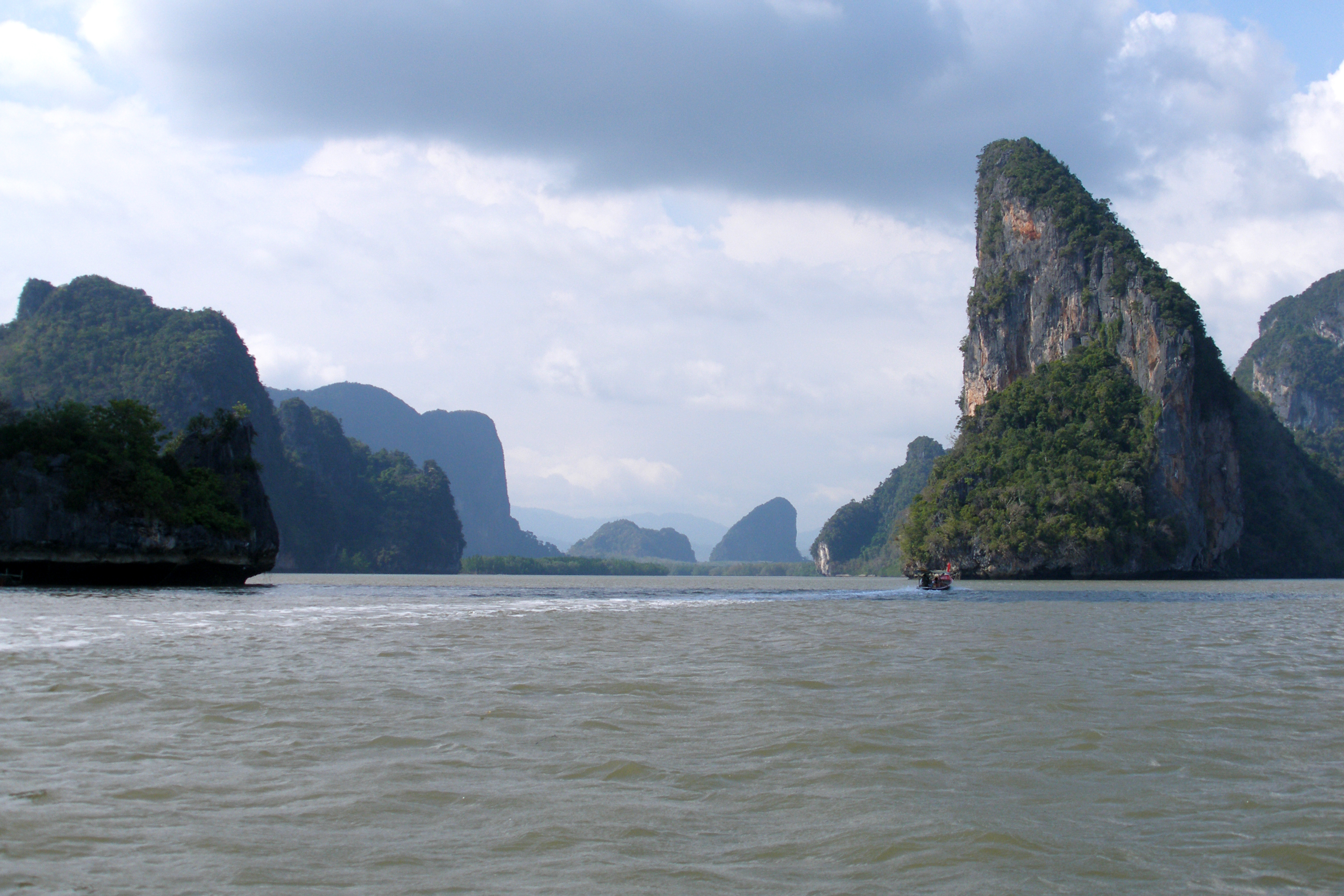
Karst formations, Phang Nga Bay.

Tropical lagoon.

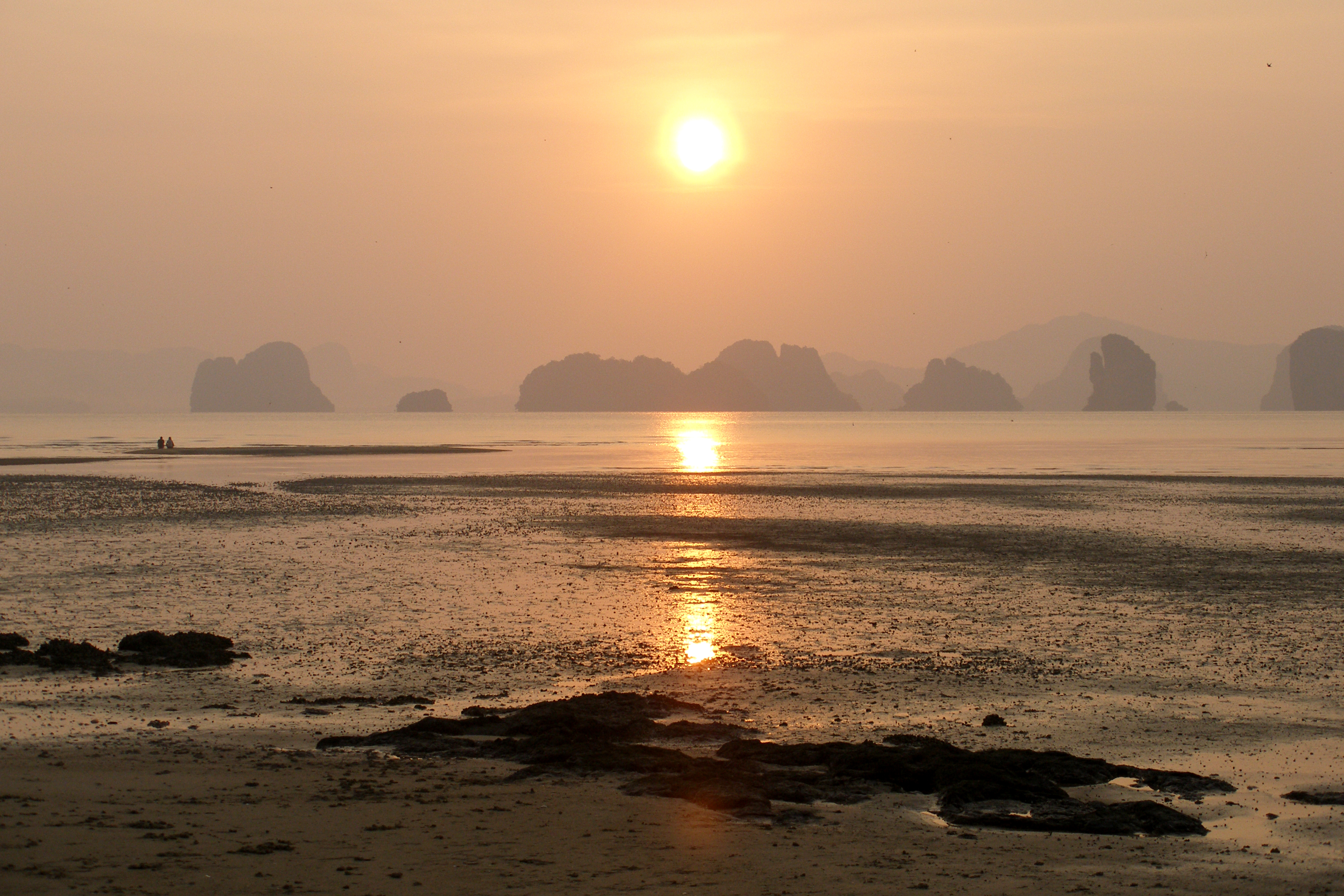
Sunrise over limestone islands, Phang Nga Bay.

== See also ==
- List of Ramsar wetlands of Thailand
- Strait of Malacca
