= List of Mission: Impossible film locations =

This is a list of locations featured in the Mission: Impossible film series. Some of the scenes were shot in another location than the one mentioned in the movie. For example, the scene in the Austrian Alps in Mission: Impossible – Dead Reckoning (2023) was actually shot in Norway.

== List of locations ==
Locations are listed in order of appearance. Studio sets are not included.

Location	Real life landmarks	Details
Mission: Impossible (1996)
Prague, Czech Republic	The Charles Bridge, The Old Town and Liechtenstein Palace	The first part of the film is set in Prague, where the IMF team has a mission inside the United States embassy. However, the building shown in the movie is not the location of the real-life embassy, but the Liechtenstein Palace. Agent Jim Phelps (Jon Voight) is seen running across the Charles Bridge to reach the embassy building.
Langley, Virginia, United States	The CIA headquarters	The IMF team enters the CIA headquarters' vault to steal some files in what became one of the most recognizable scenes of the movie franchise.
London, England	The Liverpool Street tube station	The IMF team stays in a safehouse very near the Liverpool Street tube station. Agent Ethan Hunt (Tom Cruise) goes to the station to use a public phone, then goes to a café inside the station to discuss with Agent Phelps.
Between the United Kingdom and France	The Channel Tunnel	The final action scene takes place on board a train departing the United Kingdom and crossing the underwater tunnel en route to France.
Mission: Impossible 2 (2000)
Utah, United States	Dead Horse Point	Ethan Hunt is seen climbing one of the rocks.
Sydney	The Sydney Opera House, the Sydney Harbour Bridge, and the Sydney Tower	In the first half of the movie, Nyah Nordoff-Hall arrives in Sydney to meet her ex-boyfriend. The rest of the story happens in Sydney where shots of the Sydney Harbour can be seen. The ending scene takes place in a park just behind the Opera House.
Mission: Impossible III (2006)
Virginia, United States		Agent Ethan Hunt lives in an unnamed city with his fiancée.
Berlin, Germany		The IMF team has a mission in a factory in a fictive city of Kriesburg, which is said to be located outside Berlin.
Rome, Italy and Vatican City	Basílica of Saint-Peter and St. Peter's Square	Agent Ethan Hunt and his team infiltrate the Vatican City by climbing a wall in Rome.
Shanghai, China	The Oriental Pearl Tower	Agent Ethan Hunt flies to Shanghai to a safehouse. He breaks into the fictive Hengshan Lu building located very near the Oriental Pearl Tower.
Mission: Impossible – Ghost Protocol (2011)
Budapest, Hungary	The Hungarian Parliament Building, the St. Stephen's Basilica, the Keleti train station	The Parliament building and the basilica are visible for only a few seconds. The opening scene takes place very near the Keleti train station. Agent Benji Dunn (Simon Pegg) is seen at the top of the clock tower near the station.
Moscow, Russia	The Kremlin	Ethan Hunt escapes from a prison in Moscow. He sneaks into the Kremlin with Benji Dunn to steal some files. The Kremlin building is partially destroyed shortly later by an explosion, with the Spasskaya Tower completely collapsing.
Dubai, United Arab Emirates	Burj Khalifa	Meeting of Ethan Hunt with Sabine Moreau, a climbing scene on the glass façade of the building
Mumbai, India	Multistorey car park	Final confrontation of Hunt with Kurt Hendricks
Seattle, Washington, United States	Pier 47	Ethan Hunt meets with Luther Stickell, Jane Carter, Benji Dunn and William Brandt, while watching over his ex-wife, Julia Meade.
Mission: Impossible – Rogue Nation (2015)
Minsk, Belarus	Machulischi Air Base	Agent Ethan Hunt jumps onto a plane taking off from an unnamed airfield in Minsk.
London, England	The Thames, the London Eye, Piccadilly Circus	Agent Ethan Hunt goes to a record store to find a vinyl record containing a secret message.
Washington, D.C., United States	The Capitol	Agent William Brandt (Jeremy Renner) is questioned by members of the United States Senate.
Havana, Cuba		Agent Ethan Hunt is tracked by the CIA. A team located him in Havana but realizes that he is not hiding there anymore.
Paris, France	The Eiffel Tower	Agent Ethan Hunt is hiding in a room in the center of Paris. The Eiffel Tower is visible from the window.
Vienna, Austria	The St. Stephen's Cathedral, the Vienna State Opera	Agent Benji Dunn arrived in Vienna to attend an opera play. The St. Stephen's Cathedral is visible for a few seconds. A long action scene takes place inside and outside the Vienna Opera.
Casablanca, Morocco		Three MIF agents infiltrate an underwater vault beneath a power plant.
Washington, D.C., United States	The Washington Monument	Agents William Brandt and Luther Stickell meet briefly on a helipad in Washington, D.C., with the Washington Monument in the background.
Mission: Impossible – Fallout (2018)
Ramstein-Miesenbach, Germany	Ramstein Air Base	Ethan Hunt meets Alan Hunley (Alec Baldwin), the new IMF Secretary at the Ramstein air base and board a military plane for his next mission.
Paris, France	Grand Palais	Agent Ethan Hunt jumps with agent August Walker from a military plane and both land on the Grand Palais, in the center of Paris.
Paris, France	Archives Nationales	Agents Hunt and Walker accompany the White Widow (Vanessa Kirby) to her chateau to broker the deal for the missing plutonium.
Paris, France	Place du Trocadéro, Eiffel Tower, Place de la Concorde, Tuileries Garden, Seat of the French Ministry of Economics, The Arc de Triomphe	The new Director of the CIA Erika Sloane (Angela Bassett) meets agent Walker on the Trocadéro square, near the Eiffel Tower. Later, a French SWAT team transports Solomon Lane (Sean Harris) on a helicopter that flies over the Eiffel Tower, the Place de la Concorde, the Seine river and the Tuileries Garden, and lands near the seat of the Ministry of Economics. Solomon Lane is later kidnapped by the IMF team and Hunt is chased by the police in the center of Paris. He drives past the Arc de Triomphe and many other Parisian landmarks are visible in the background.
London, England	St Paul's Cathedral, Blackfriars Bridge, Tate Modern	Ethan Hunt chases August Walker (Henry Cavill), across London to retrieve plutonium meant to be used for nuclear weapons.
Kashmir (disputed territory between India, China, and Pakistan	Himalayas	Ethan Hunt pursues John Lark in a helicopter chase.
Mission: Impossible – Dead Reckoning (2023)
Between Russia and United States	Bering Sea	The location for the submarine prologue sequence.
Yemen	Rub' al Khali Desert	Agent Ethan Hunt travels to the Rub al-Khali desert in the Arabian Peninsula and successfully recovers a key piece of the key held by Ilsa Faust.
Amsterdam, Netherlands		Ethan Hunt receives his mission briefing.
Abu Dhabi, United Arab Emirates	Abu Dhabi International Airport	The movie starts with a mission inside the airport's terminal. (The scene was actually shot at Birmingham New Street Railway Station).
Rome, Italy		Via dei Funari, Via Nazionale, Via di S. Maria Maggiore, and Via dei Serpenti.
Hellesylt, Norway	Helsetkopen mountain	Ethan Hunt rides a motorcycle off the edge of a cliff, dismounting mid-air, before parachuting onto a moving train.
Venice, Italy	St. Mark's Basilica and Doge's Palace	
Innsbruck, Austria and Yorkshire, England	Central Eastern Alps, North Yorkshire Moors Railway	The climactic train sequence.
Mission: Impossible – The Final Reckoning (2025)
Aurland, Vestland, Norway		
Port Edward, South Africa		
Kruger National Park, South Africa	Blyde River Canyon, Mpumalanga	Finale action sequence between Ethan Hunt and Gabriel
Svalbard, Norway		
Valletta, Malta		
London, England	Westminster	
London, England	The Natural History Museum	
London, England	Trafalgar Square	
Peak District National Park	Middleton Mine	
USS George H. W. Bush		

== See also ==
- List of James Bond film locations
