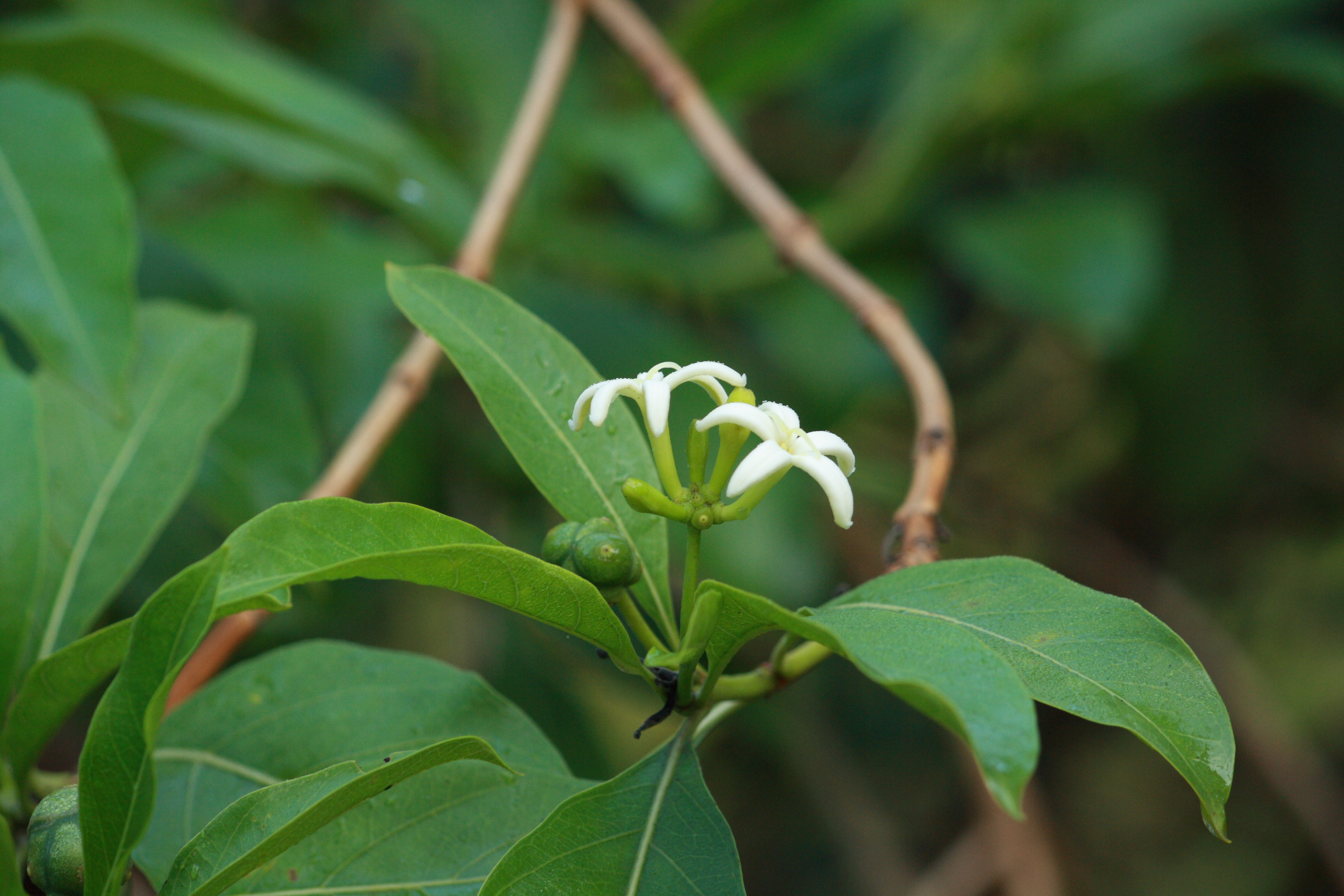

Scientific classification
- Kingdom: Plantae
- Clade: Tracheophytes
- Clade: Angiosperms
- Clade: Eudicots
- Clade: Asterids
- Order: Gentianales
- Family: Rubiaceae
- Genus: Morinda
- Species: M. coreia

Binomial name
- Morinda coreia Buch.-Ham.

Synonyms
- Morinda aspera Wight & Arn.; Morinda coreia var. aspera (Wight & Arn.) Deb & M.Gangop.; Morinda exserta Roxb.; Morinda pubescens Sm.; Morinda pubescens var. aspera (Wight & Arn.) M.Gangop.; Morinda tinctoria Roxb.; Morinda tinctoria var. aspera (Wight & Arn.) Hook.f.

= Morinda coreia =

Species of flowering plant

Morinda coreia is a species of flowering plant in the coffee family, Rubiaceae. It was described by Francis Buchanan-Hamilton in 1822.

== Distribution and habitat ==
Morinda coreia is native to southeast Asia, from Sri Lanka and India southeast to Java.

== Gallery ==
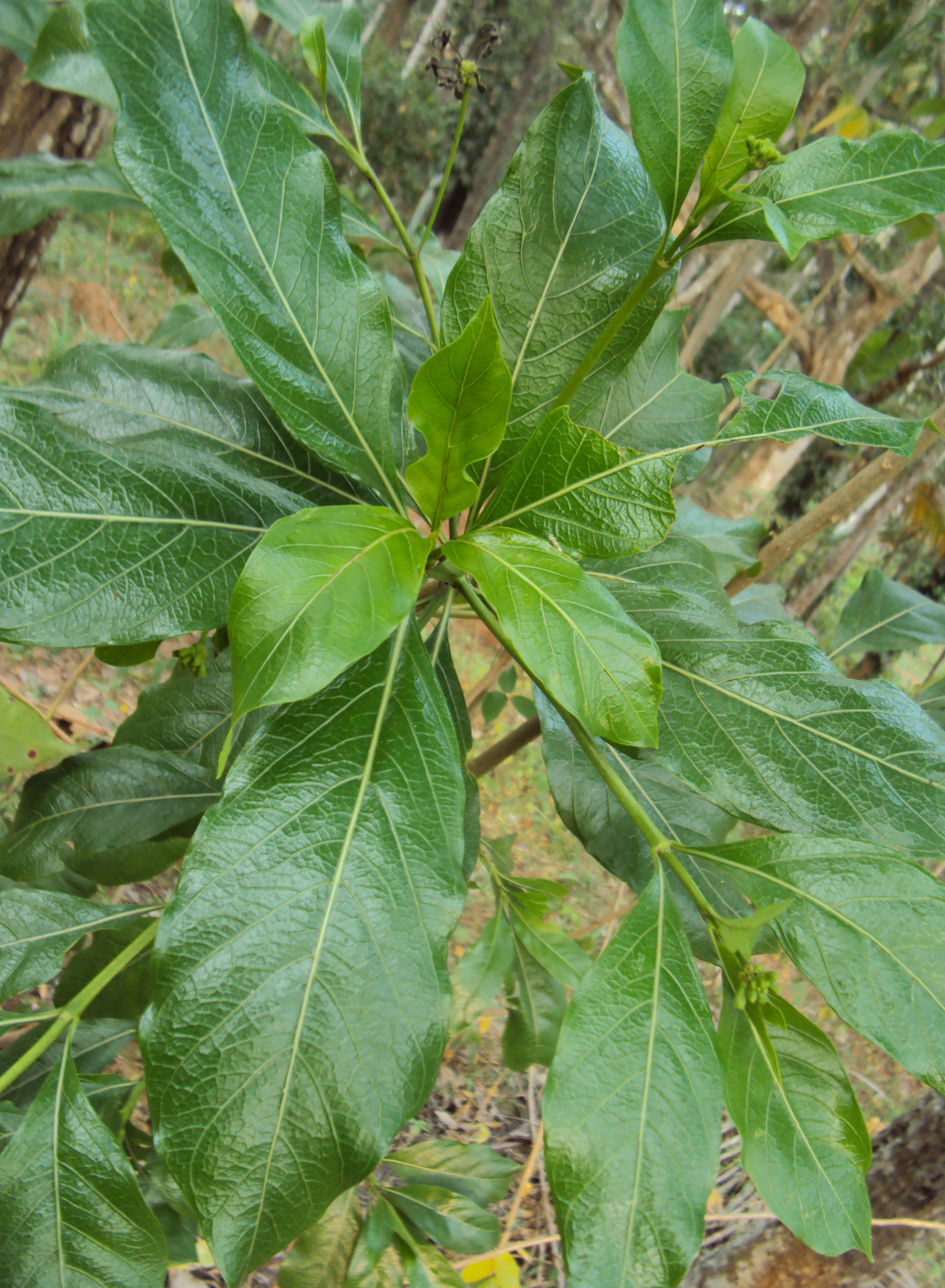
Leaves

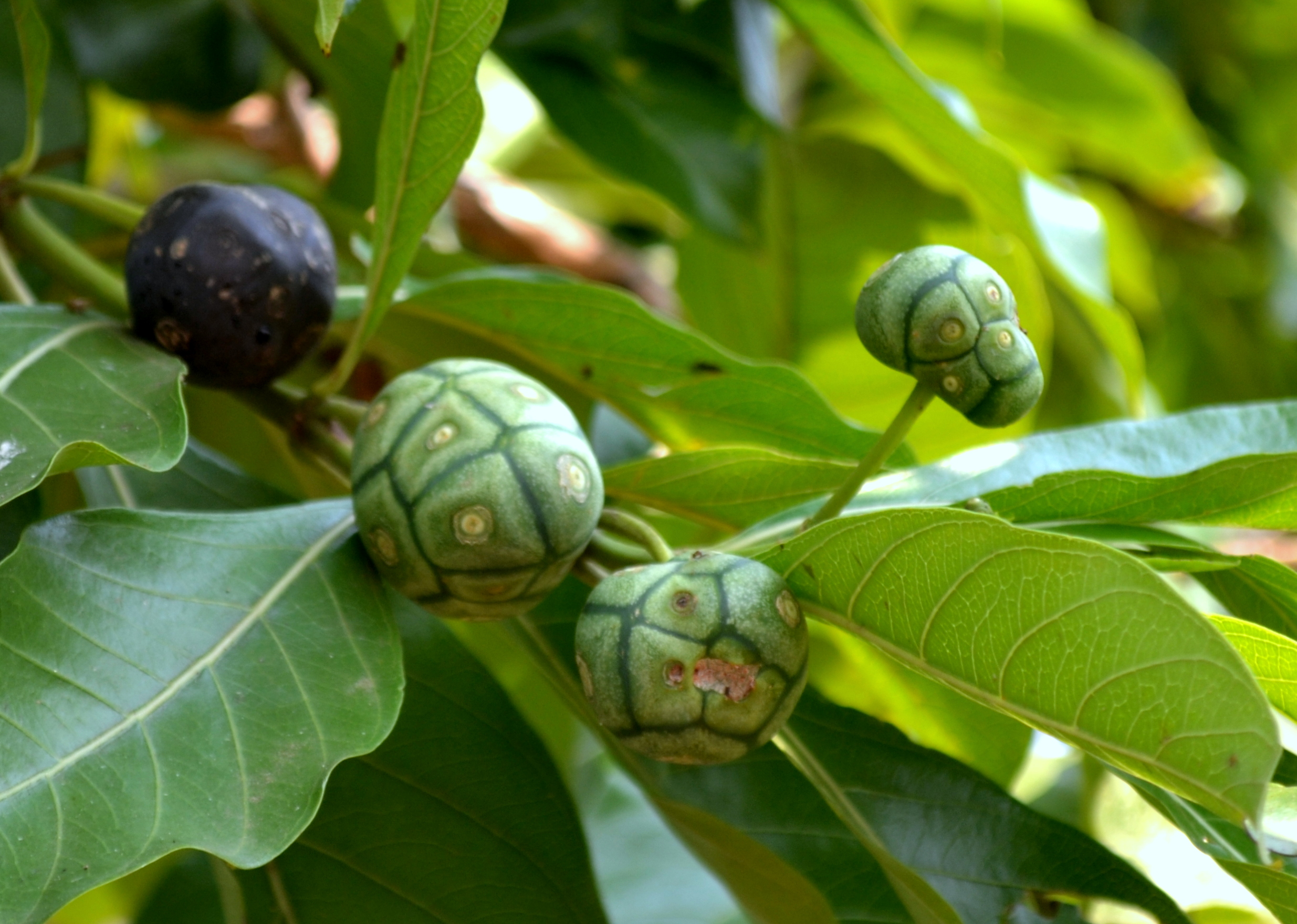
Fruits
