= Gimmelwald =

- Municipality
- Panorama of Gimmelwald.

- Flag Coat of arms
- Location of Gimmelwald
- Location within Switzerland Location within Canton of Bern
- Coordinates: 46°32′49″N 7°53′37″E
- Country: Switzerland
- Canton: Bern
- District: Interlaken-Oberhasli
- Municipality: Lauterbrunnen

Area
  - Total: 30.4 km^{2} (11.7 sq mi)
- Elevation: 1,364 m (4,475 ft)

Population (December 2025)
  - Total: 109
  - Density: 3.59/km^{2} (9.29/sq mi)
- Time zone: UTC+01:00 (CET)
  - Summer (DST): UTC+02:00 (CEST)
- Postal code: 3826
- ISO 3166 code: CH-BE
- Website: http://www.gimmelwald.ch

Gimmelwald (Swiss Standard German pronunciation: [ˈɡɪml̩ˌvald]) is a small car-free village in the Bernese Oberland in the Canton of Bern, Switzerland, and is located between Stechelberg and Mürren, at an elevation of 1,364 meters (4,475 feet). The village is located at the foot of the UNESCO World Heritage site Jungfrau-Aletsch Protected Area. Gimmelwald is an Alemannic linear village and a Walser settlement first mentioned in a bill of sale in 1346. Because of its very typical and exceptional townscape, Gimmelwald is part of the inventory of Swiss heritage.

Gimmelwald is one of the few car-free villages in Switzerland where access by car is not possible due to a missing road connection. The Schilthorn cable car stops in Gimmelwald, where it is possible to board another cable car which runs between Gimmelwald and Mürren. Farming and tourism are the main sources of income. Farmers raise hay on tiny plots of land to feed small herds of cows. In winter, farmers often work as well for the Schilthorn cable car by performing such jobs as running ski lifts or ski-slope grooming.

In the year 2003, the population of Gimmelwald was 130. The local school closed in 2010 due to the small number of students; students now attend the school in Lauterbrunnen. The school building was bought in 2019 by a cooperative to convert it into flats and to prevent it from being used as a holiday flat.

== Traffic and accessibility ==
There is a walking path between Gimmelwald and Mürren, but Gimmelwald is lacking connection to the main road system. The main means of transportation to Gimmelwald is the Luftseilbahn Stechelberg-Mürren-Schilthorn (LSMS) aerial tramway famous for connecting the Lauterbrunnen valley to the Schilthorn.

The cable car connects Gimmelwald with the neighbouring elevated village of Mürren and the village of Stechelberg, which is situated at the floor of the Lauterbrunnen valley.

From Stechelberg a bus connects Lauterbrunnen where there are connections to the rest of Switzerland.

The Lauterbrunnen Via Ferrata climbing route also connects the village to Mürren.

== Politics ==
Gimmelwald, together with Wengen, Mürren, Isenfluh, Stechelberg, and Lauterbrunnen, belongs to the municipality of Lauterbrunnen. The municipality covers the entire valley.

== Tourism ==
The main source of income for Gimmelwald is tourism, and the village has a small hotel, former pension (now a British run hotel), a bed & breakfast and the Mountain Hostel. Gimmelwald was stopped from being developed into a large ski resort by having it declared an avalanche zone which is only partly the case. In summer, Gimmelwald is mostly visited by tourists from North America, and in winter it is mostly visited by European and Swiss tourists for winter sports.

Gimmelwald has a 2.2 km long via ferrata connecting the neighbouring village of Mürren.

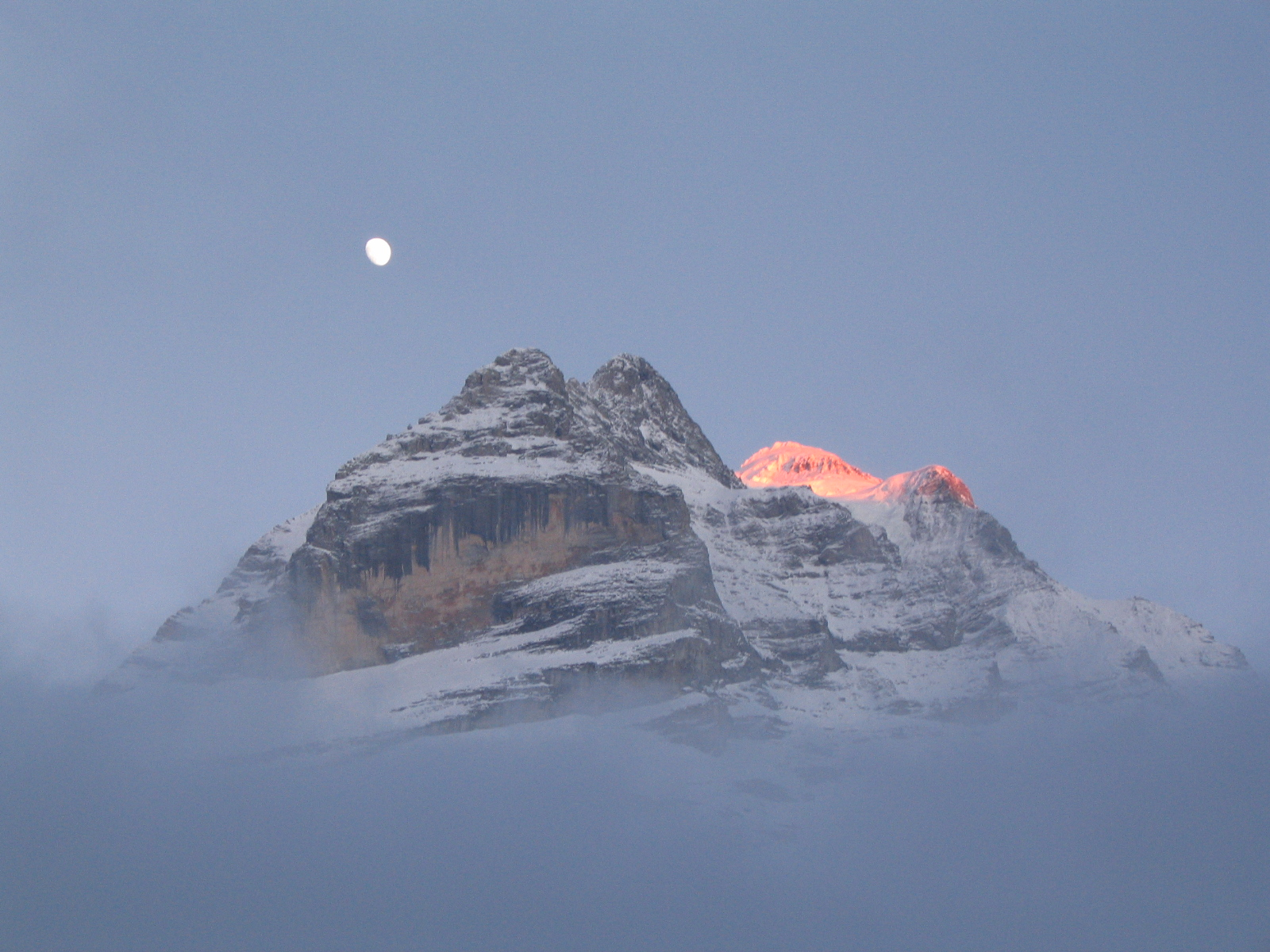
The Jungfrau seen from Gimmelwald.

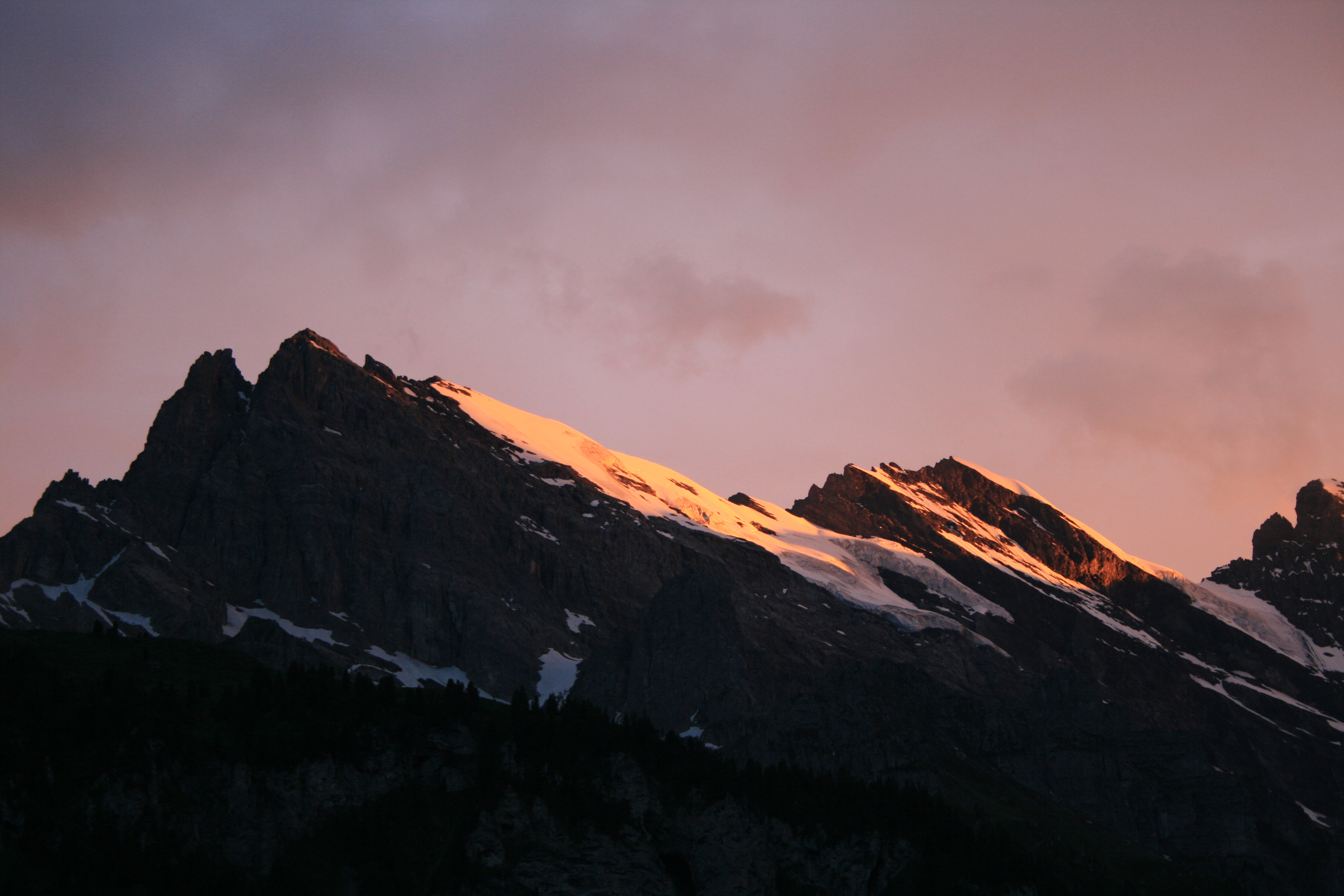
The Gspaltenhorn seen from Gimmelwald.
