= Kacper Tekieli =

Polish mountain climber (1984–2023)

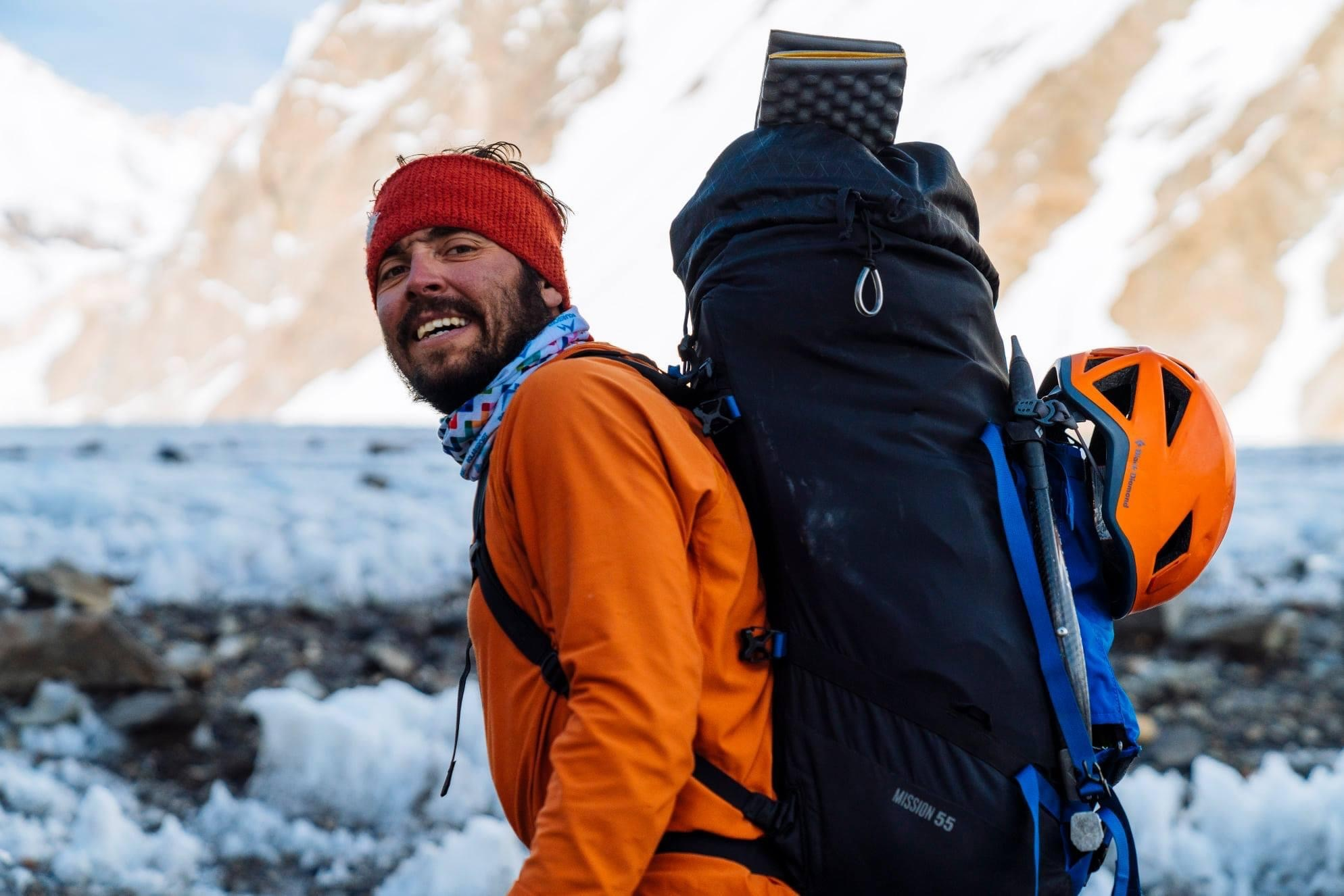
- Kacper Tekieli in Himalayas
- Born: 23 November 1984; Gdańsk, Poland
- Died: 17 May 2023 (aged 38); Stechelberg, Switzerland
- Occupations: Mountaineer; climbing instructor
- Spouse(s): Małgorzata Lebda (divorced); Justyna Kowalczyk (m. 2020)
- Children: 1

Kacper Tekieli (23 November 1984 – 17 May 2023) was a Polish mountain climber and sport climbing instructor with a title given by the Polish Alpinism Association (pl: Polski Związek Alpinizmu). His accomplishments in mountaineering include ascents of the Tatra Mountains, Mount Elbrus, Makalu, Broad Peak, and the Alps. He died in an Jungfrau avalanche in the village of Stechelberg in 2023.

== Early life ==
Tekieli was born in Gdańsk, Poland on 23 November 1984. He obtained a master's degree in philosophy, during which he experienced his first fascination with the mountains in the Bieszczady Mountains. In the 2007/2008 season, he was a member of the sports club Otryt Lutowiska and worked in Bacówka near Mała Rawka. After graduating, he spent a few months in the mountains of Alaska, worked in Refuge Murowaniec for a year, and then moved to Kraków and took up mountaineering.

== Climbing career ==
In the Tatra Mountains, Tekieli climbed about 300 climbing routes, in particular most of the most important mountain walls, albeit alone. In 2010, as part of the 6th International Elbrus Race, he ran to the top of Mount Elbrus in less than five hours, and two years later, together with Przemysław Pawlikowski, he finished in twelfth place in the 9th Butcher Run. In 2010, Tekieli was a participant in the Polish Winter Himalaism 2010–2015 program. As part of this project, he took part in expeditions to Makalu and Broad Peak Central. He walked routes in the Alps (including the north face of the Eiger, Matterhorn, Grandes Jorasses, and the north-west face of Monte Civetta in the Dolomites), Colorado (Jeff Lowe's Octopussy, historically the first M8 ice route, and other difficult classic ascents), Nevada and Alaska, and also the fastest diretissima of the northern face of the Mięguszowiecki Szczyt Wielki.

Over time, Tekieli came to the conclusion that "the essence of mountaineering is to climb a difficult wall in the most favorable conditions", the choice of the most logical solution to a given mountaineering problem. This approach resulted in successes on "chain walks", projects forming several separate climbing routes into a coherent, meaningful whole within a single mountain action. He often made such crossings in the Tatra Mountains alone and without protection, also in winter conditions. On 18 October 2018, he climbed the porch pillar and both pillars of Rumanowy Szczyt in this way in seven and a half hours, and it was a project he had been working on for a long time. On 5 July 2019, together with Łukasz Mirowski, in a record time of 15 hours and 52 minutes, he defeated the Expander by Krzysztof Pankiewicz, a Tatra chain, connecting climbing routes with grade 6–7, on the walls of Mały Młynarz, Kotła Kazalnica Mięguszowiecka, Mnich and Kościelec.

During this period, Tekieli also remained involved in Himalayan mountaineering to some extent. In autumn 2016, he also took part in the tragic expedition to Shivling, where he carried out a difficult rescue operation, in which together with Paweł Karczmarczyk he reached the mortally wounded Łukasz Chrzanowski and tried to help him. The following year, Tekieli declined the invitation to the Polish winter expedition to K2 and instead went to the mountains of Scotland, where he led new climbing routes with Sandy Allan and Andy Nisbet. In summer 2018, he organized an expedition with Allan, Rick Allen and Stanislav Vrba to create a new route to Broad Peak, which ended in failure after two dangerous accidents. First, Rick Allen fell from a considerable height during a solo reconnaissance. He was found and saved thanks to an innovative action using UAV (the first in the history of Himalayan mountaineering). Then Stanislav Vrba suffered a serious leg injury as a result of a rock chipping while climbing. Tekieli managed to abseil with him on a rope to the base of the wall, from where, together with other climbers, he carried the injured man through the glacier to the base.

In 2019, Tekieli achieved further significant successes in the mountains of Europe. In addition to the aforementioned Expander, on 4 August, as the fourth or fifth in history, he made a double traverse of the Matterhorn (crossing all four ridges with the top being reached twice in one mountain action), and on 13 November, alone and without using a rope, the north-east face of the Eiger by the Lauper route; both passes were noticed by the international media. In the same year, he marked out and completed three new climbing routes in central Norway, collaborating with Michał Czech, Jan Kuczera and Wadim Jabłoński. For one of these achievements, climbing a new route to Snøvasskjerdingan, in 2020, he was on the list of several dozen nominated for the Piolet d'Or award. On 13–14 August 2020, Tekieli climbed all the peaks of the Great Crown of the Tatra Mountains in 37 hours and 28 minutes, improving the previous record by over 11 hours. On 2–4 March 2021, he returned to Expander with Maciej Ciesielski and Piotr Sułowski, making the first winter ascent (43 hours and 50 minutes of continuous mountain action in deep snow)—such an undertaking was previously considered impossible and they became pioneers. For this ascent, they received the Kraków Mountain Award 2021.

== Personal life and death ==
Tekieli's first wife was writer Małgorzata Lebda. On 24 September 2020, in Gdańsk, he married a two-time Olympic champion in cross-country skiing, Justyna Kowalczyk. In 2021, their son Hugo was born in Kraków. Tekieli set himself the goal of climbing all 82 Alpine four-thousanders in record time (less than 61 days). From 6 to 17 May he climbed eight four-thousanders. On 17 May 2023, after reaching the Jungfrau summit, he died during the descent due to an avalanche in the village of Stechelberg. His body was not found until the next morning. Tekieli was 38.
