= Rottal Hut =

Coordinates: 46°31′34″N 7°56′41″E

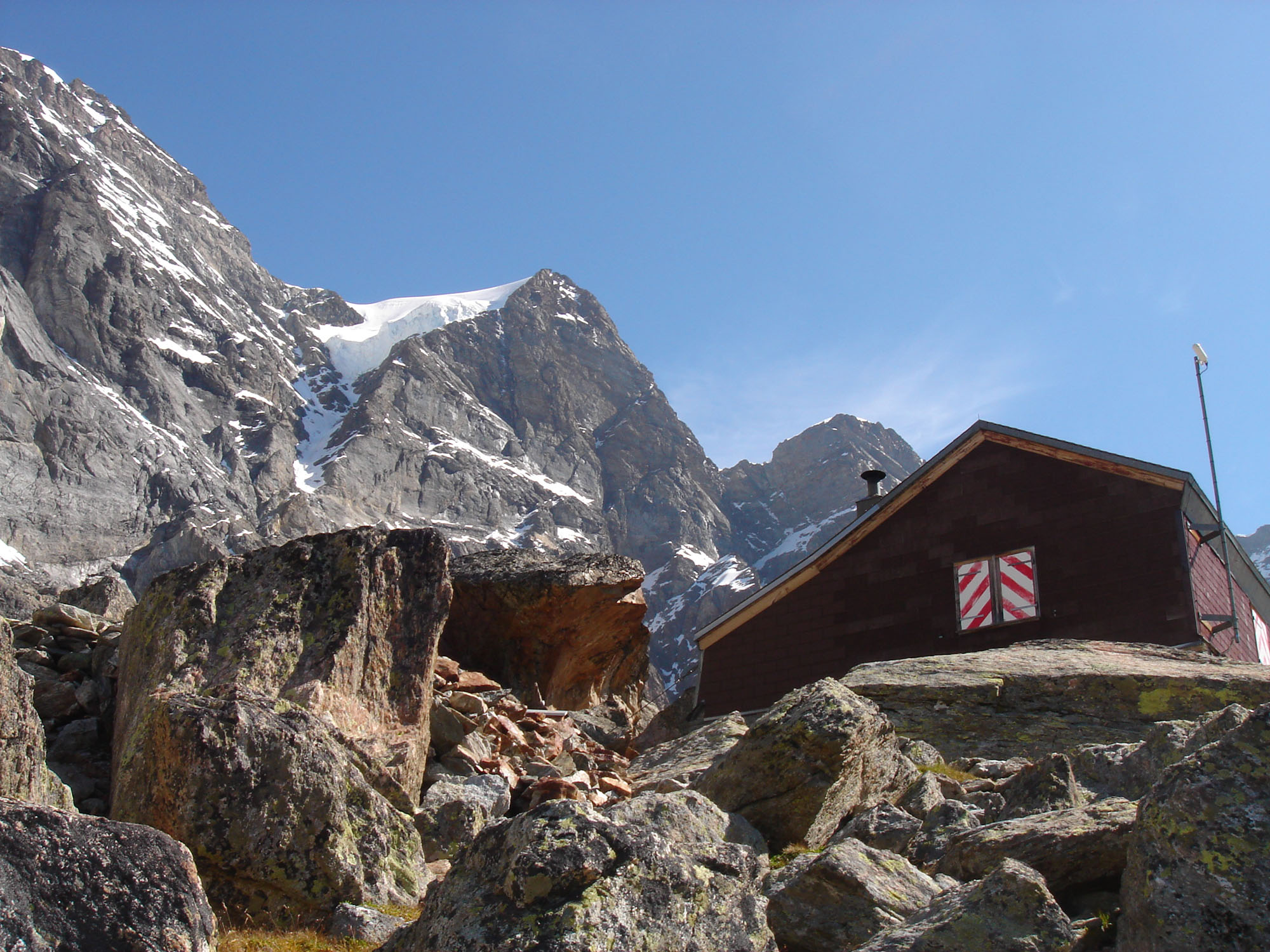
The Rottal Hut with the Rottalhorn in background

The Rottal Hut (German: Rottalhütte) is a mountain hut of the Swiss Alpine Club, located south of Lauterbrunnen in the canton of Bern. It lies at a height of 2,755 metres above sea level, above the Rottal Glacier on the western slopes of the Jungfrau.

The shortest access is from Stechelberg or Trachsellauenen.
