= Splendid Mountain Watercolours =

Collection of sketches and watercolors by John Singer Sargent

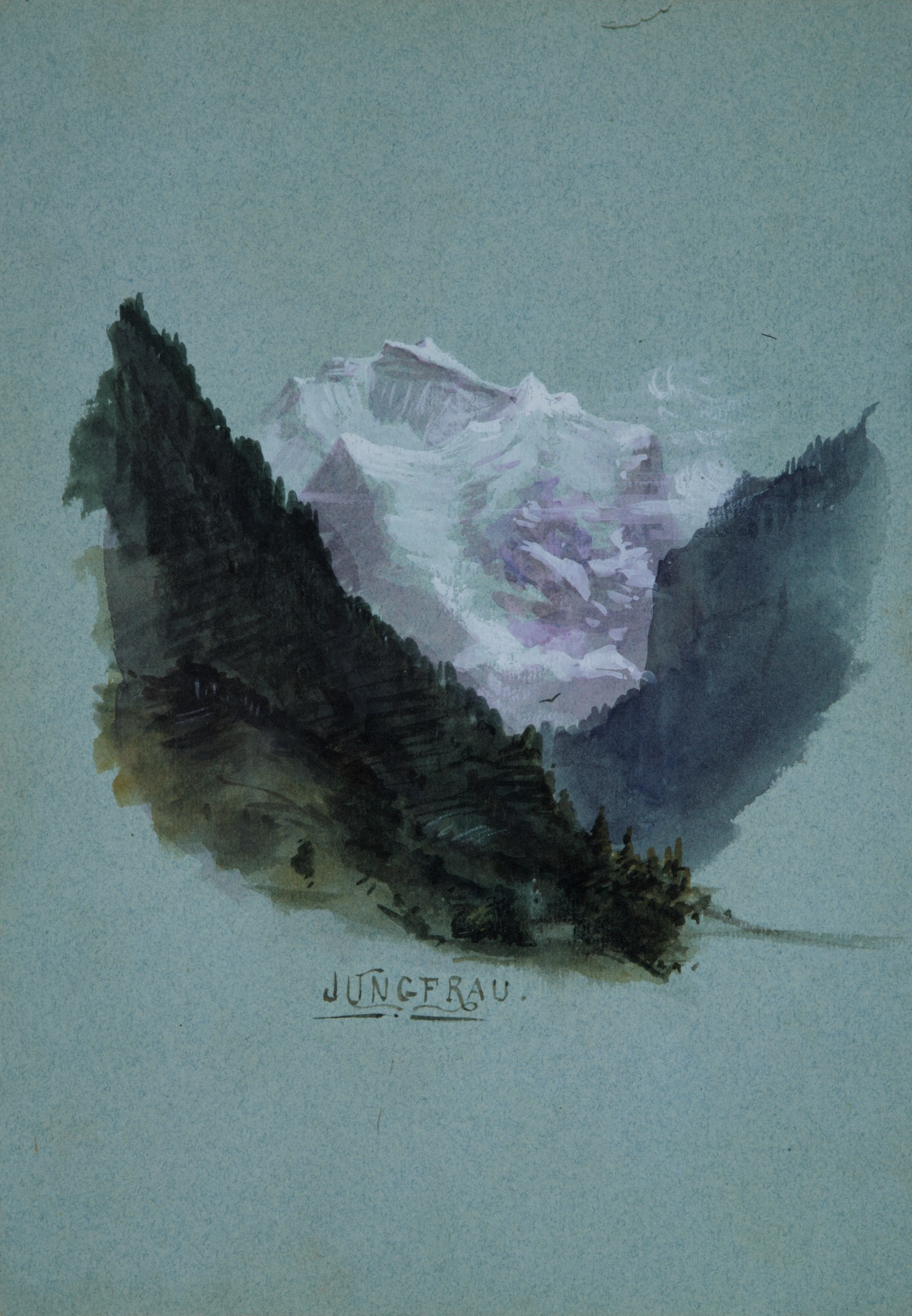
Jungfrau, 1870, Watercolor, Gouache, and graphite on pale blue wove paper

Splendid Mountain Watercolours or Splendid Mountain Sketchbook is a collection of sketches and watercolors by John Singer Sargent (1856–1925), executed when he was fourteen years old, and on a summer excursion to Switzerland's Bernese Alps in the Berner Oberland in 1870. The sketchbook contains 60 leaves, including 14 watercolors and 47 crayon or graphite studies of the mountains, landscapes and people he encountered while traveling with his family.

Sargent began working in the notebook during a three-week trek with his father at the end of June 1870, after which he spent the rest of the summer with the entire family in the high Alpine village of Mürren, where he continued to fill the book. Stylistically the landscapes reflect techniques popularized in 19th-century art manuals, particularly John Ruskin's Elements of drawing. However, the young artist, who lacked formal art education, devised other and more sophisticated techniques to render snow, glaciers, ice, and mist.

In 1950 his sister, Frances Ormond, bequeathed it to the Metropolitan Museum of Art; in 1988 it underwent conservation.

== Journey ==
In the summer of 1870, FitzWilliam Sargent and his wife Mary (née Mary Newbold Singer), left their home in Florence to escape the summer heat for a summer in Switzerland, with their three children, John, Emily and four-month-old infant Violet. The youngest family member was formally baptized in May in Lake Maggiore where they stopped for a week. In search of cool temperatures in the Bernese Highlands after an unusually hot spring in Italy, the family crossed the St. Gotthard Pass in a carriage on June 3, arriving on the shores of Lake Lucerne in Flüelen.

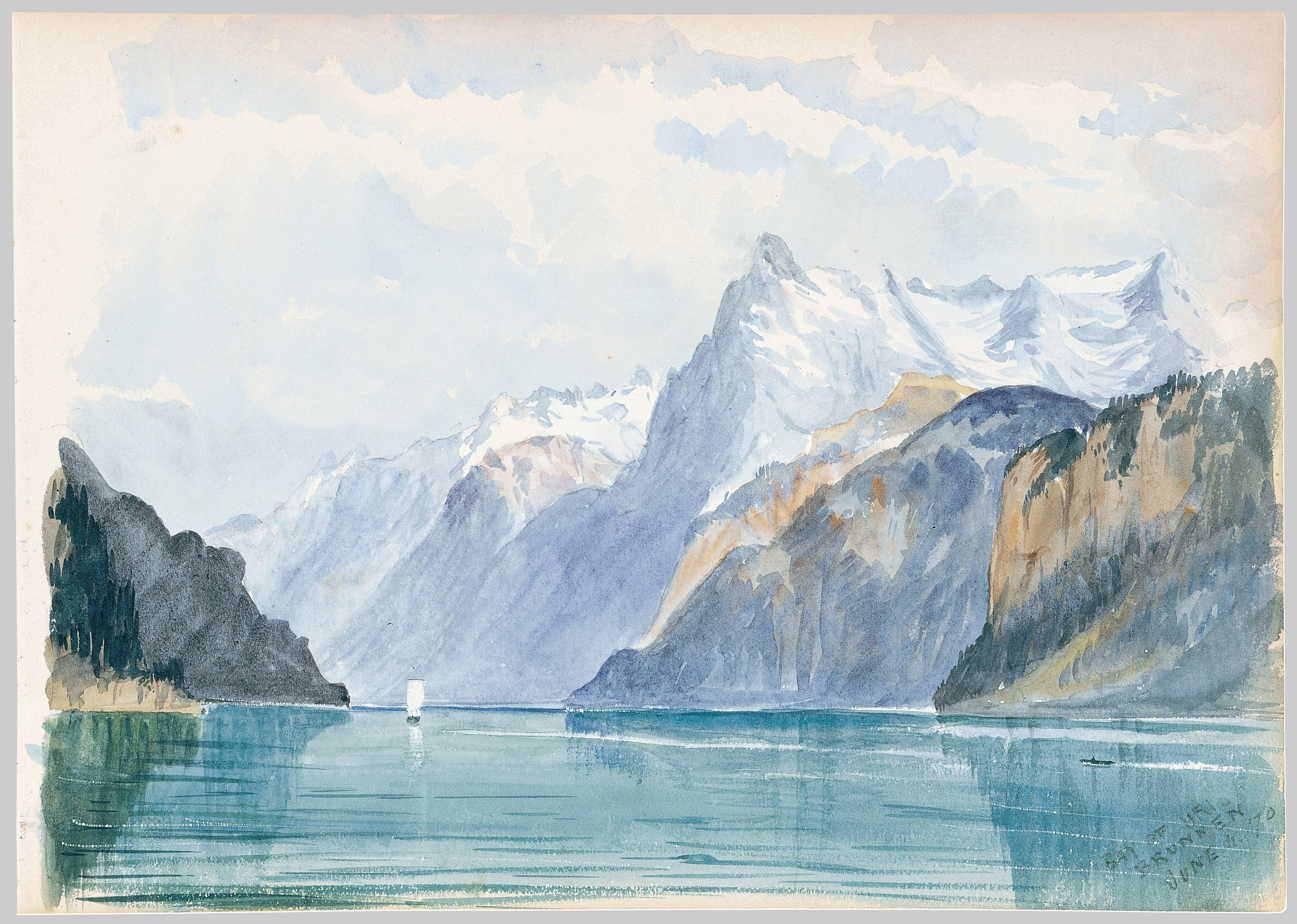
Bay of Uri, Lake Lucerne from Brunnen, June 4, 1870

Their itinerary is described in a letter FitzWilliam wrote,

We crossed the St. Gotthardt to Fluelen — hence to Berne & Thun. From Thun, John and I, after incubating three weeks, hatched a three-weeks walk amongst the Mountains & Glaciers — going over the Gemmi to Zermatt, to the Riffelsberg to the Aggishorn, the Rhone Glacier, the Grimsel, Meiringen etc. etc. to Interlaken where we found the rest of the family.

From Interlaken they made their way up to Lauterbrunnen and up to the mountains to the high Alpine village of Mürren. Sargent began his "chronological pictorial diary" on June 30, making notations of dates and places visited. The family spent a month in Mürren. FitzWilliam wrote to his mother on a postcard depicting their chalet boarding house:

We are ... more than 5000 feet above the sea, — looking upon the Jungfrau and other snow-covered mountains "thick as blackberries". The air is delicious, tonic and not too cold ... the walks about Mürren ... amongst pines, rocks, tumbling streams and waterfalls, looking across gorges amongst glaciers and mountains 12,000 feet high eternally covered with snow and ice, from which avalanches roll and thunder daily.

After a month the family left Mürren, crossed over to Grindelwald, to Mt. Pilatus and then down to Lucerne. In October they were back in Florence. That month FitzWilliam wrote to his mother in America, "John seems to have a strong desire to be an artist ... and we have concluded to gratify him and to keep that in plan in view of his studies."

== Sketchbook ==
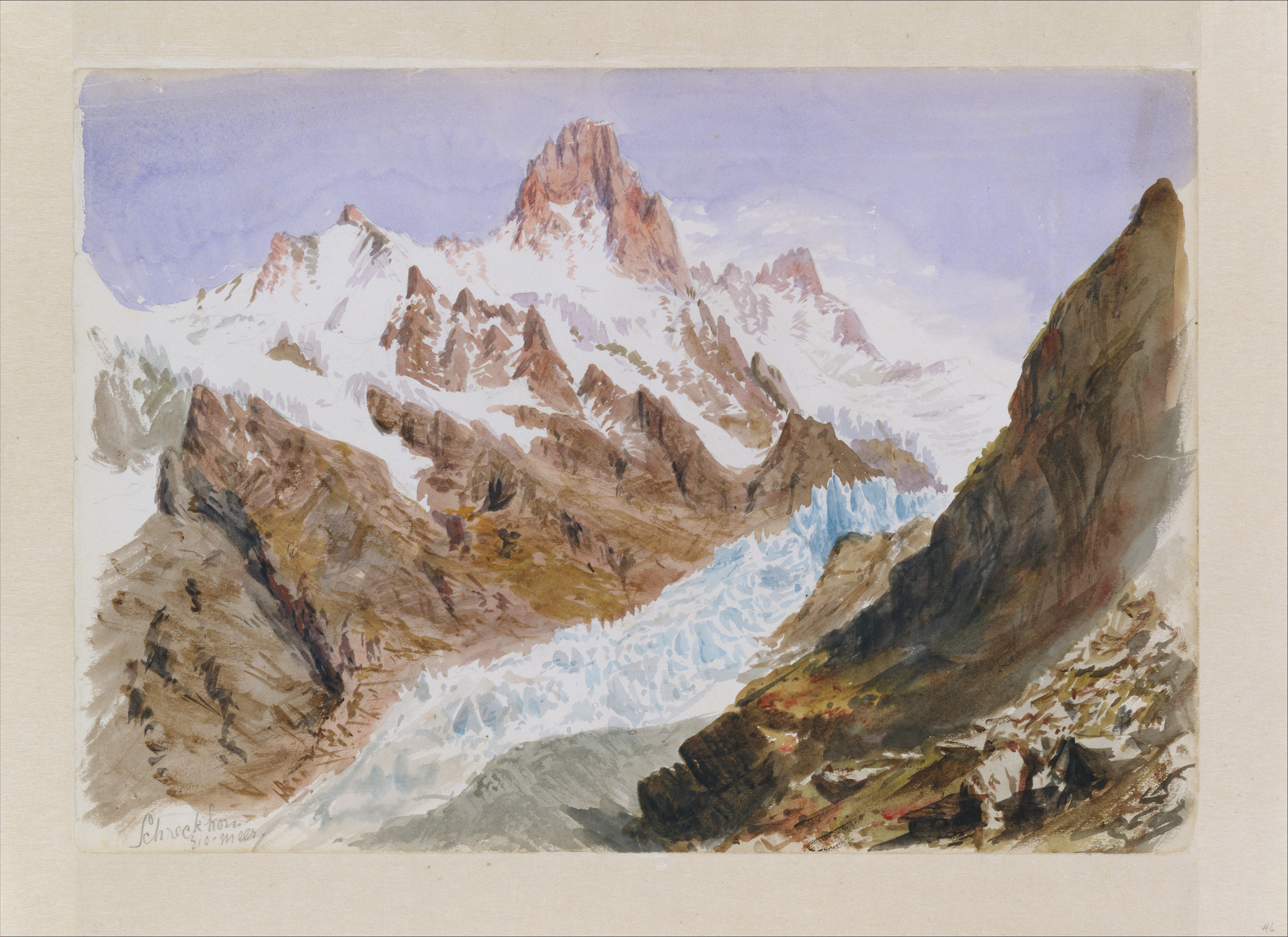
Cover of Splendid Mountains, Schreckhorn with Eismeer glacier, watercolor on cardboard, 1870

The sketchbook contains 47 studies drawn directly onto the pages, some of which were simply cursory sketches. Fourteen of the leaves are watercolors, either landscapes and portraits, possibly pasted into the book. Of the remaining 33 sheets, six were executed in crayon and 13 in black graphite, most of them executed early in the trip, and some additional sketches executed in pencil and charcoal upon the family's return to Florence at the end of the summer.

Although Sargent appears not to have received any formal art training before the trip, art historian Marjorie Shelley writes, "yet even as an untutored artist the seeds of Sargent's virtuoso are evident", and that the "drawings merely hint at the brilliance of his mature style".

== Style ==
The sketches and landscapes in the book appear to reflect popular contemporary artistic trends with an emphasis on romantic themes and techniques, such as the depiction of Alpine landscapes, as well as the usage of contemporary materials, watercolor techniques and media. Stylistically the watercolors reflects techniques John Ruskin made popular in his 1857 Elements of Drawing — such as treatment of landscapes and use of paints, however Sargent also exhibits his own style in his brushstrokes, and in his use of older, traditional, and less popular wet wash techniques.

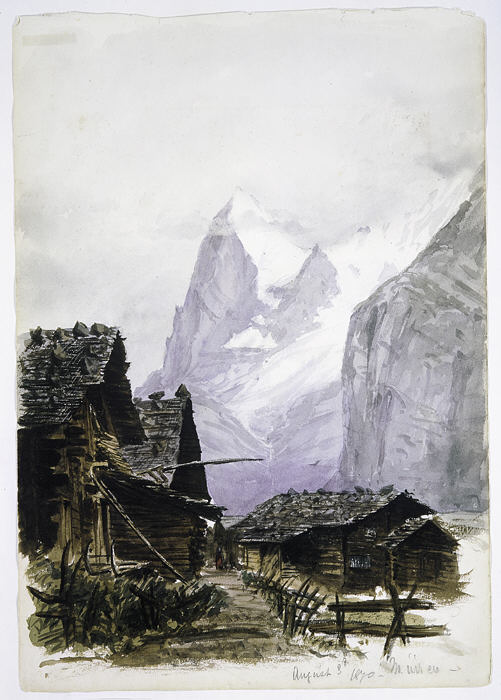
Chalets in Mürren with the Eiger in the background

Ruskin advocated against idealizing nature; rather he advised "strict fidelity in depicting exactly what one observed." He advised aspiring artists to seek the "humble and commonplace" such as the "much-beloved Swiss Alps". Consistent with Ruskin's contemporary art theories, Sargent's landscapes are true depictions of what he saw. The locales are easily identified and Sargent gives attention to the topography of the mountainous terrain. According to art historian Shelley, the sheets in the sketchbook "reveal careful attention to ... capturing the color and form of the mountains, the expanses of snow, the waterfalls and boulders, the weight and shadows of the clouds."

=== Watercolors ===
Sargent used various watercolor techniques but a favorite seems to have been the use of Gouache (or body color) with opaque and semi-opaques layered and stippled, using very little water. He affected light with subtractive techniques, evident in View of the Eiger from Mürren. There he created a mist-like effect at the mountain's peak by rubbing away paint; the dark timbers of chalets in the foreground received additional tonalities by cutting into the paint with a paint knife.

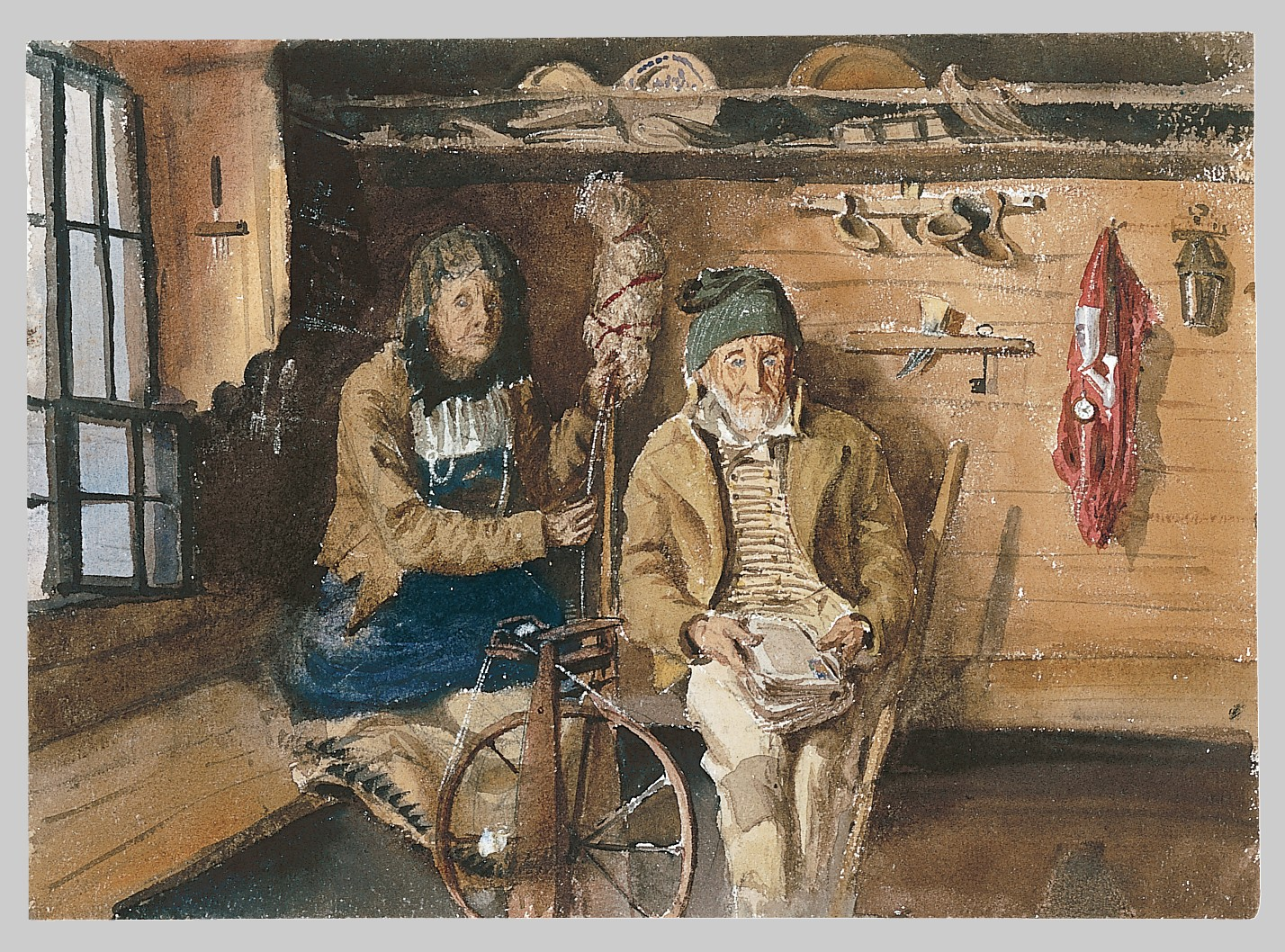
"Frau von Allmen and an Unidentified Man in an Interior", shows the inside of chalet in Mürren

The taking away, or subtractive, techniques were used by J. M. W. Turner and by the summer of 1870 well-documented in 19th-century artists books. In contrast, Ruskin was opposed to such techniques, lecturing against the use of sponges and textured paper. A number of the paintings in the sketchbook are executed on textured paper and Sargent made various uses of the textures. For example "Frau von Allmen and a companion" shows areas of textured paper left unpainted to highlight reflections in on the objects in the chalet's interior. "Jungfrau" is painted on blue paper; the mountain is rendered in Chinese White, although he resorted to the older and more traditional lead white to render snow elsewhere, such as "Mt. Pilatus".

=== Other media ===
The crayon and graphite sketches exhibit different characteristics, based on the media type. The sketches done with hard graphite emphasize sharp lines; whereas those done in black crayon show looser lines, as seen for example in a sketch of a mountain waterfall. Shelley believes the crayons drawings to be the best in the collection, the "most artistically mature". They presage his mature style, showing a boldness, "rapid repetition and reworking of lines", techniques such as hatching, all of which combine to develop perspective and build a sense atmosphere.

== Provenance ==
In 1950 Sargent's sister, Francis Ormond, bequeathed the sketchbook along with another, simply titled "Album 3" (also filled during the same Switzerland trip), to the Metropolitan Museum of Art. The artist inscribed the title Splendid Mountain Watercolours on a paper affixed to the cover of the sketchbook. It was not until 1988 that the museum began a conservation project on the sketchbook. It had arrived at the museum in disarray — pages had become loose from the binding, fallen out and put back at random with no regard to their order. The pages were carefully reordered in chronological order by matching to dates and locations from in family letters and according to stylistic similarities. The reassembled book shows Sargent executed the studies and paintings in sequence as he was traveling with this family that summer.

== Gallery ==
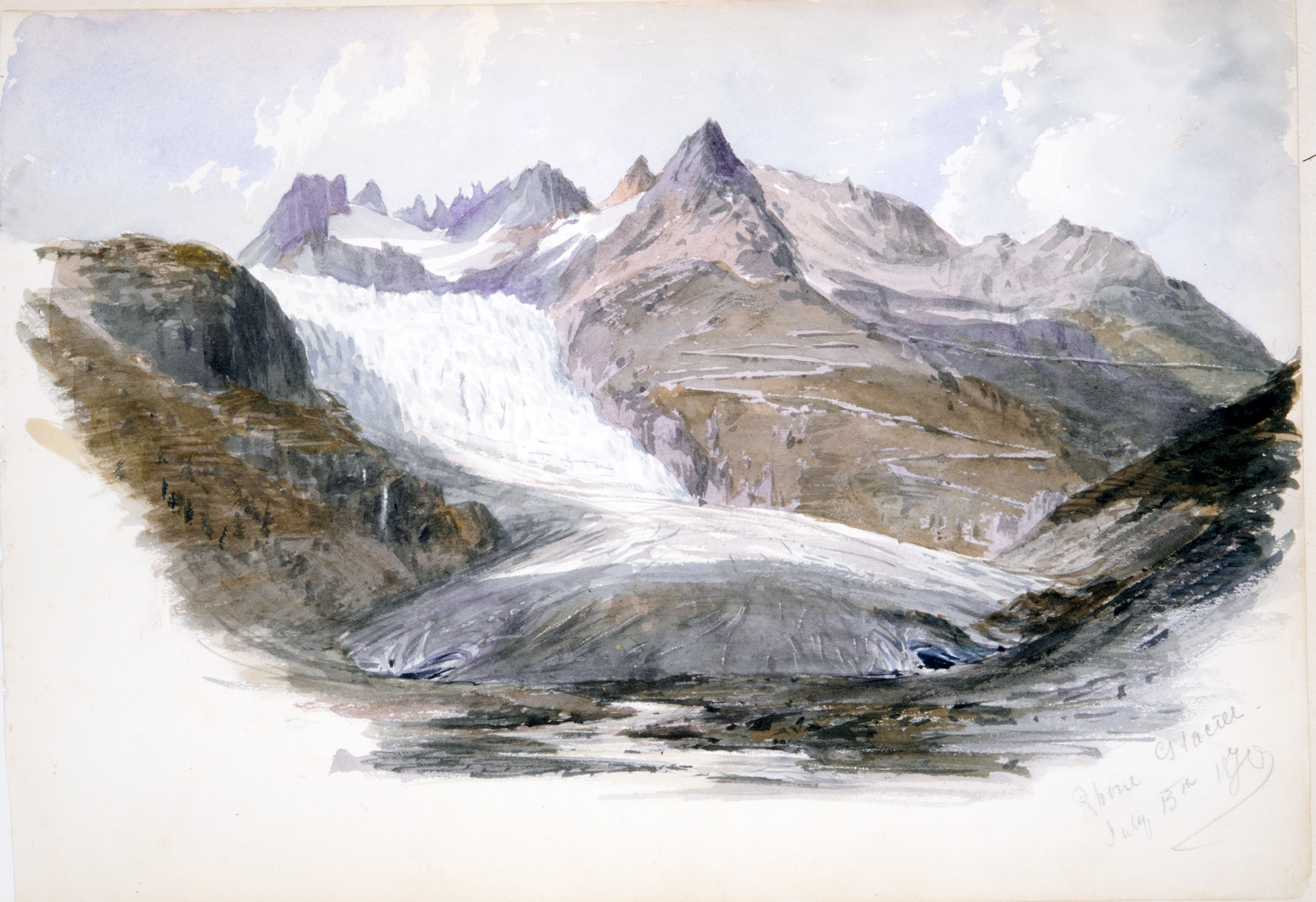
Rhône Glacier, July 15, 1870

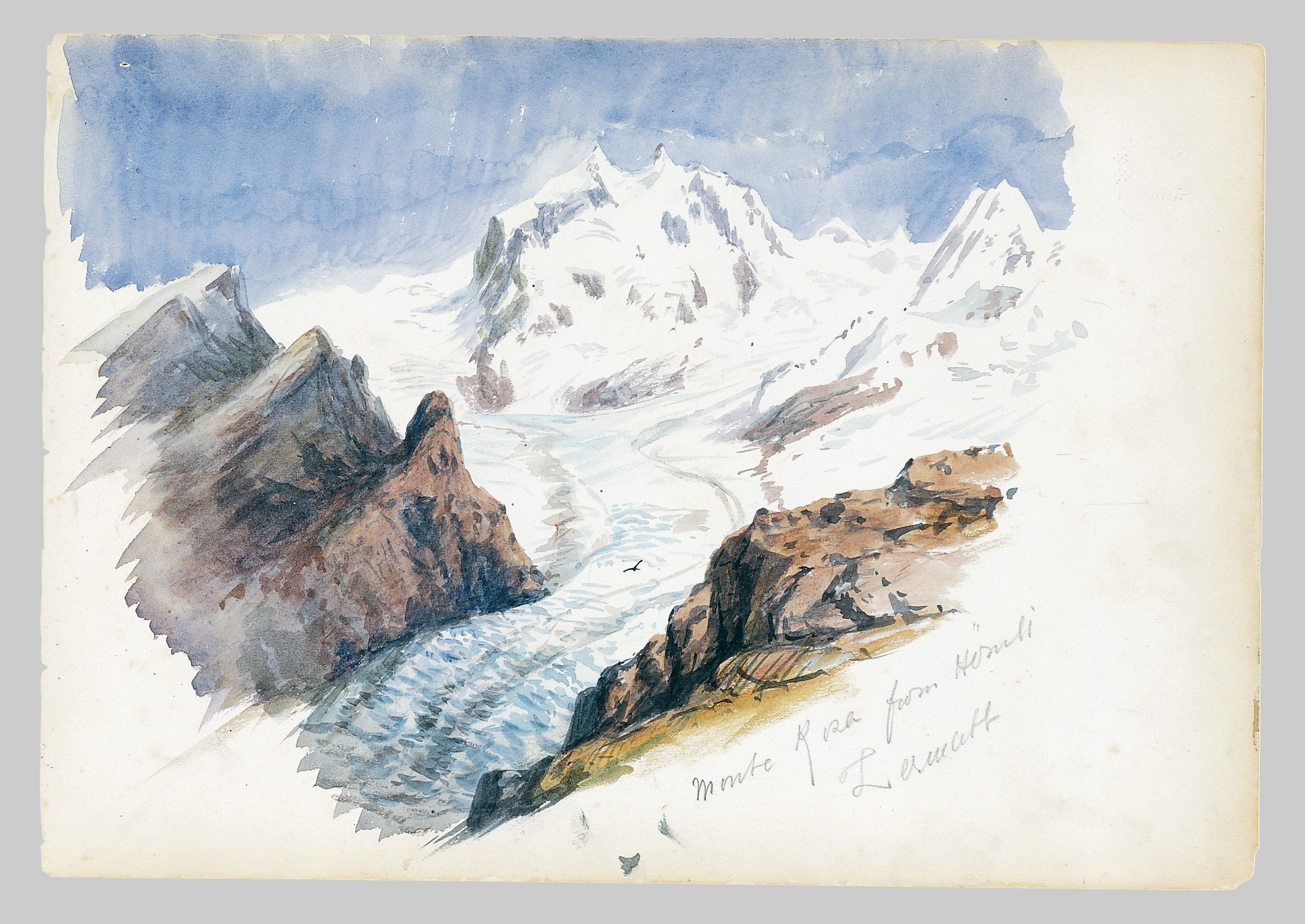
Monte Rosa viewed from Zermatt

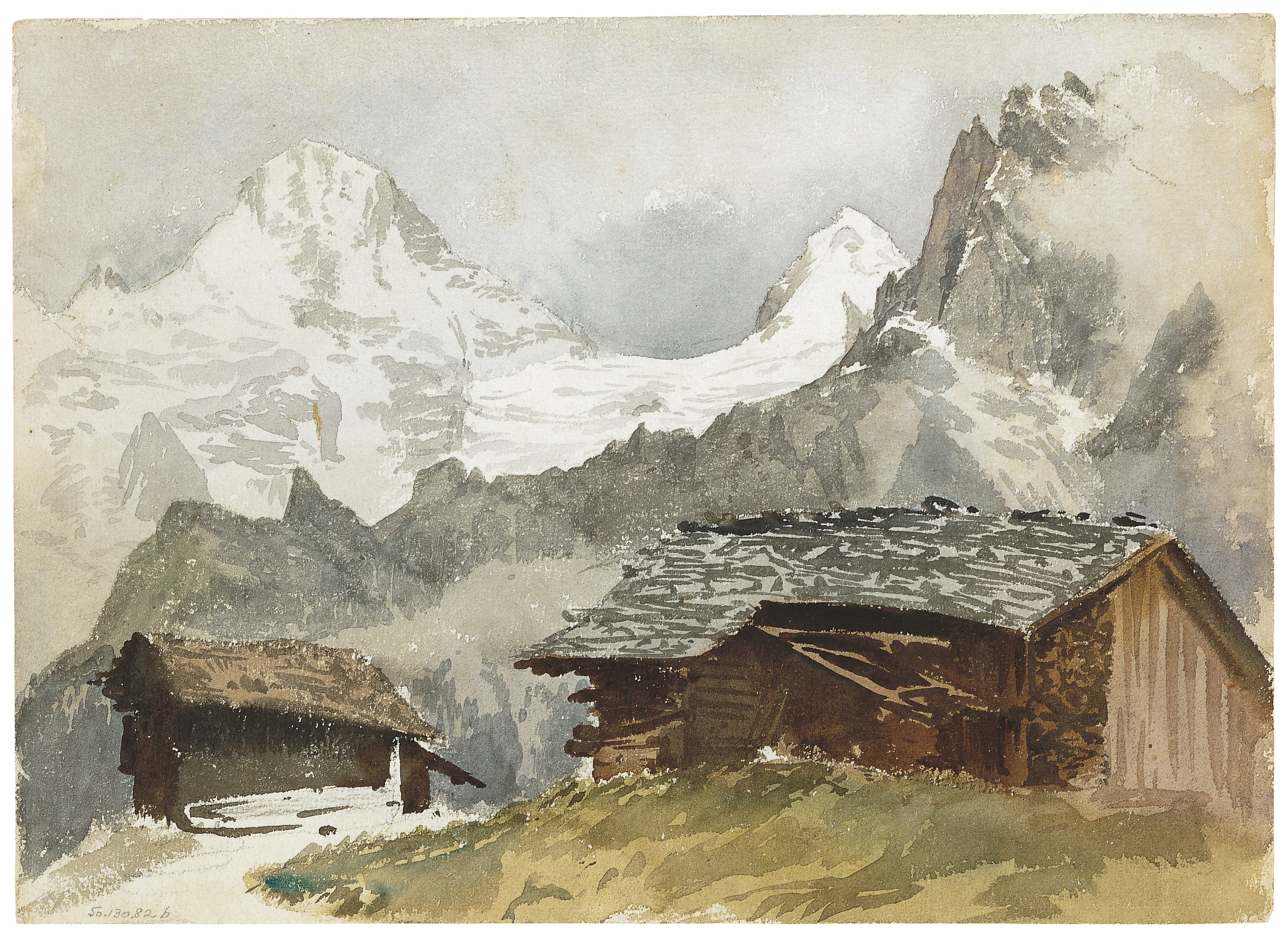
Watercolor of Mürren, the Breithorn in the background, chalets in the foreground

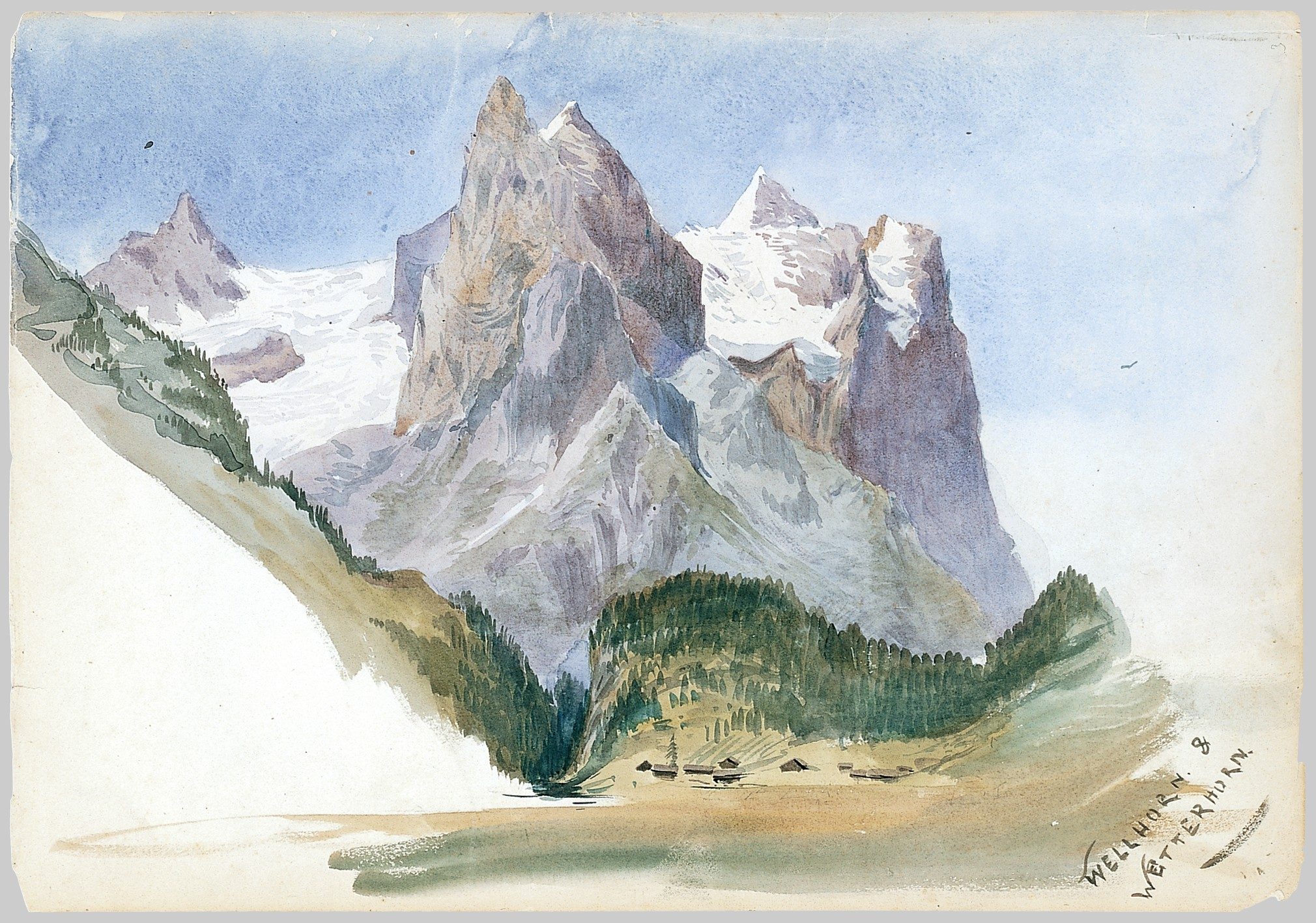
Wetterhorn

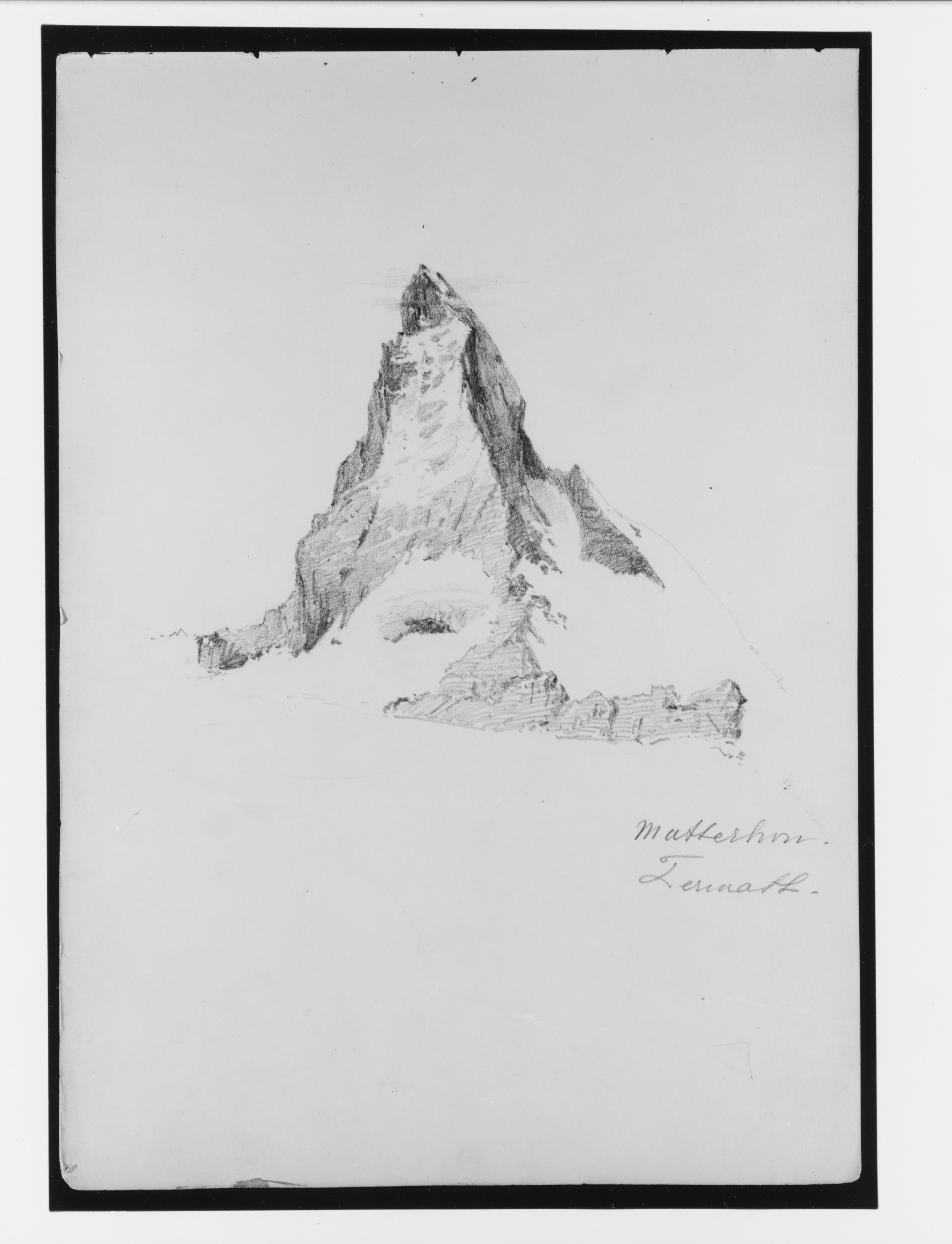
Matterhorn in pencil

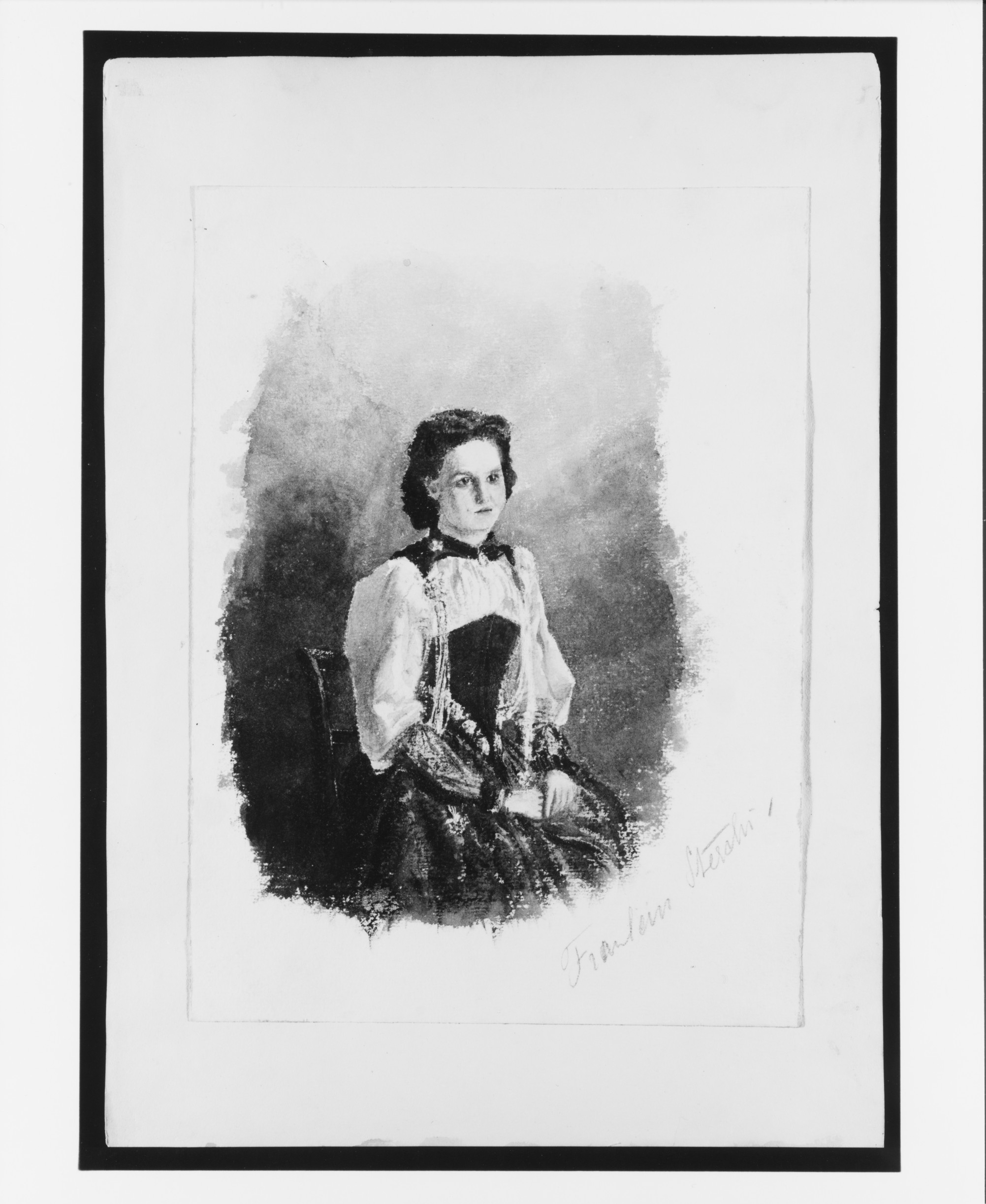
Swiss woman wearing traditional Berner Oberland costume

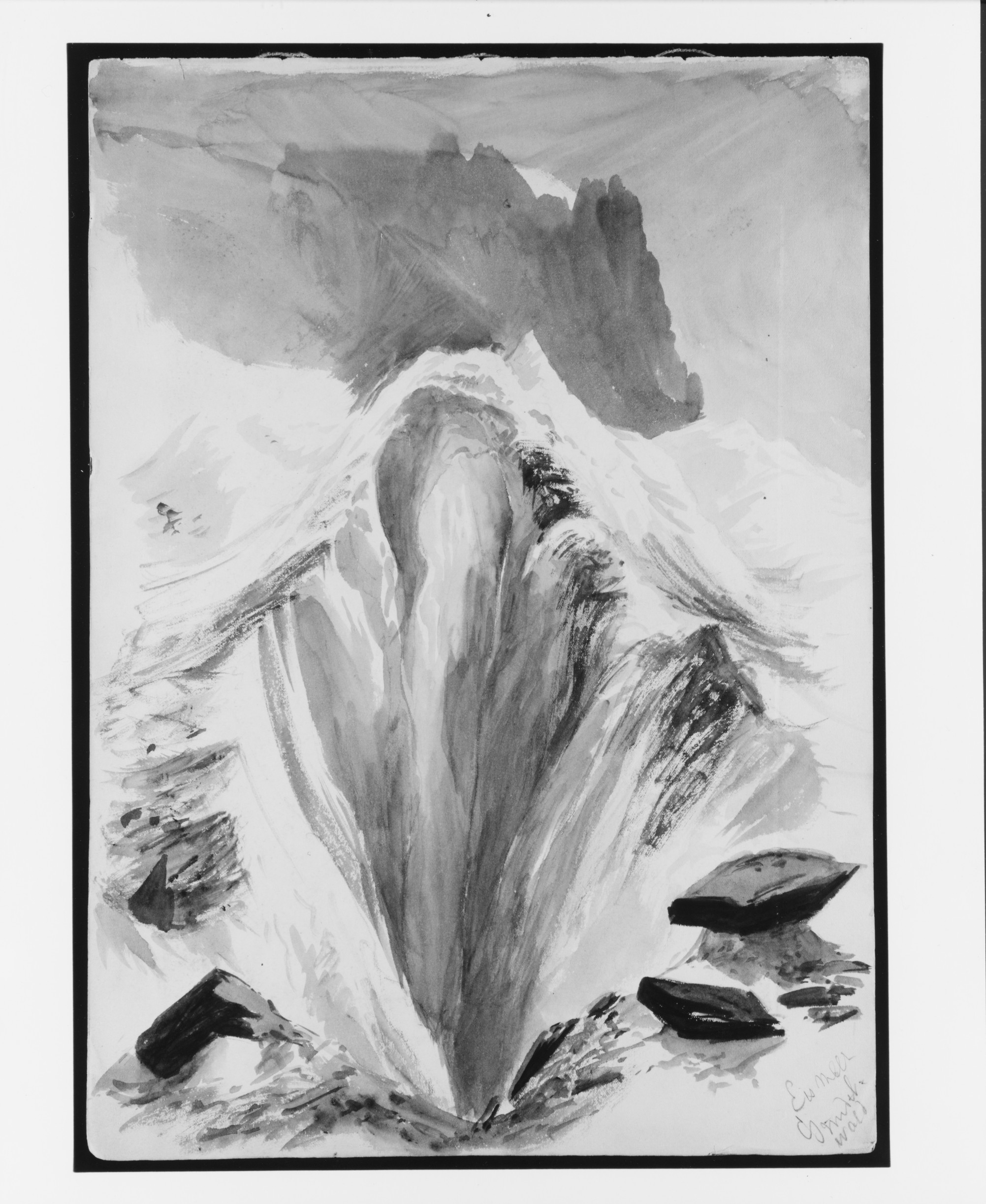
Grindelwald

== See also ==
- List of works by John Singer Sargent
