= Scaramanga =

Scaramanga or Skaramanga may refer to:

== Place ==
- Skaramagas, Greece

== People ==
- Ivan Skaramanga (1820–1902), Russian regional (Taganrog based) industrialist, banker and diplomate.
- James Scaramanga (1898–1918), First World War Greek-British flying ace credited with twelve aerial victories
- Francisco Scaramanga, a fictional James Bond character from The Man with the Golden Gun

== Sports ==
- The Scaramanga Roped Race, a Swiss ski race

== Music ==
- Jonny Scaramanga, guitarist on Kee Marcello album Redux: Europe
- "Scaramanga/The Force" (Feat. Fergie) from album Agnelli & Nelson
- Scaramanga, DJ featured on DJ-Kicks: Stereo MCs
- The Scaramanga Six, English rock band
- "Scaramanga", a 1989 song by Dan Hartman from album New Green Clear Blue
- "Scaramanga", song by Raging Speedhorn from We Will Be Dead Tomorrow
