= Kandahar Ski Club =

Ski racing club

Kandahar Ski Club
- Patron: The Duke of Kent
- Founded: 1924
- Founder: Sir Arnold Lunn
- Club Centre: Mürren, Switzerland
- Membership: >1,000
- Website: kandahar.org.uk

The Kandahar Ski Club was founded by Arnold Lunn and other British skiers (Note: Amongst these was Andrew Irvine who would lose his life a few months later with George Mallory in their attempt to ascend Everest.) on 30 January 1924 in Mürren, Switzerland. The club was founded as a ski racing club and with the purpose of promoting downhill and slalom racing at a time when Alpine skiing competitions were not recognised internationally.

The Kandahar Ski Club takes its name from the Roberts of Kandahar Challenge Cup; the first ski race held was in 1911 over the Plaine Morte Glacier in Crans-Montana, Switzerland for a trophy donated by Field Marshal Earl Roberts of Kandahar. (Note: Roberts took his title from the relief of Kandahar in the Second Anglo–Afghan War.) The winner was Cecil Hopkinson.

== History ==
The first Winter Olympic Games also took place in 1924 as did the foundation of the FIS. There were only Nordic events at these games and the FIS was concerned only with these. The club's aim was to ensure that the Alpine disciplines were included in the future. In the same year the club issued a challenge to the British skiers in Wengen across the valley. The competition was for a slalom and a downhill race, which was won by the Kandahar. The skiers from Wengen went on to form the Downhill Only Ski Club (DHO). Swiss skiers also shared the objectives of the Kandahar. In Mürren were brothers Walter and Max Amstutz, both of whom were keen downhill skiers and were friends with the British. Walter Amstutz founded the Schweizerischen Akademischen Skiklub in November 1924.

By 1927 the club had attracted over 200 members, but Alpine skiing still was not recognised by the various National Ski associations, although at university level, international competitions were being held between the Swiss, Germans, Austrians and British. The first Inferno Race took place in January 1928 when 19 members of Kandahar Ski Club climbed the Schilthorn (2,970m) above Mürren to race down the 2,100 metres to Lauterbrunnen, 14 kilometres away.

The FIS finally admitted the Alpine events to its programme in 1930 and in 1931 the FIS held their Alpine Championship in Mürren. It was organised by the British. At the end of the 1930s, the objectives of the club had been achieved - downhill and slalom racing were internationally accepted under the rules that they had helped develop. The club had over 600 members.

== Mürren ==
The Kandahar Ski Club has its clubhouse in Mürren, where the Scaramanga Roped Race is organised by the club around New Years Day each year.

== Inferno Race ==
The International Inferno Race takes place in Mürren at the end of January each year with over 100 club members taking part. The race is now organised by the Skiclub Mürren, attracting more than 1,700 competitors from 25 countries

== Race Training ==
The Kandahar Ski Club organises Junior Race Training to support British ski racing. Training camps take place throughout the year.
