= Scaramanga Roped Race =

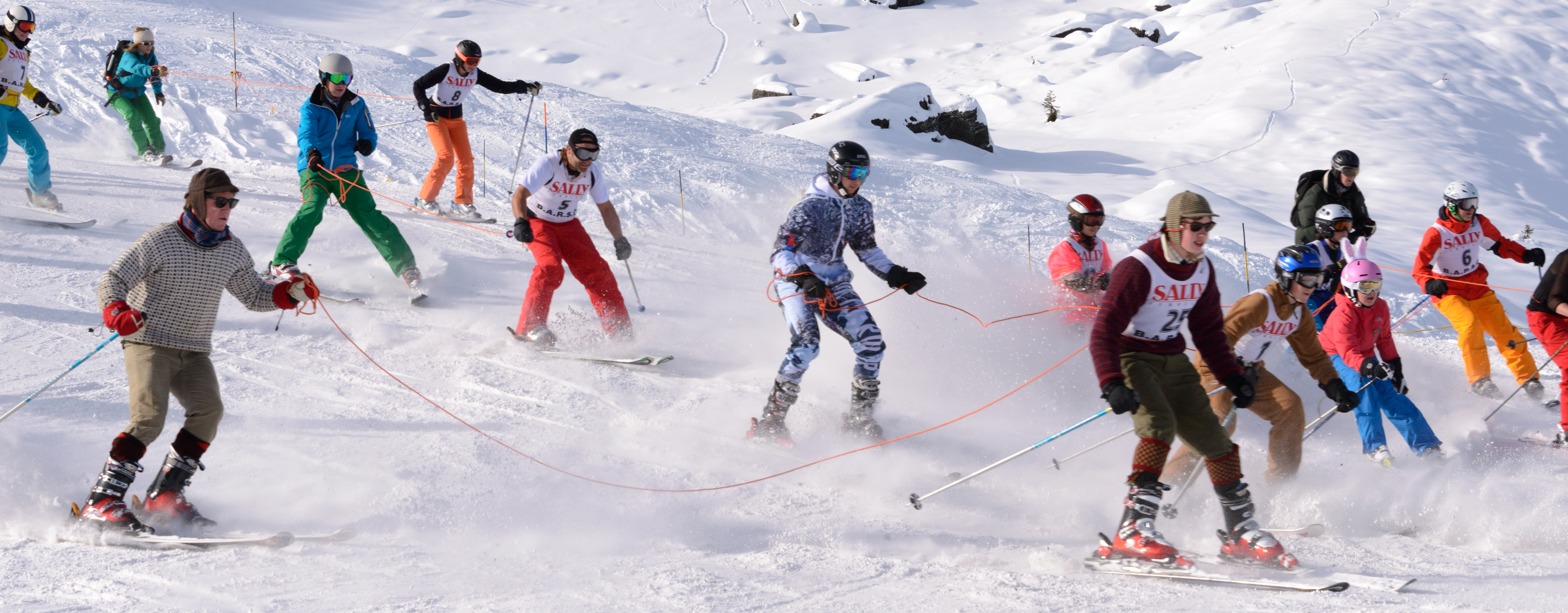
Scaramanga Roped Race 2014

The Scaramanga Roped Race is a ski race for pairs of skiers roped together. It takes place annually in the Swiss village of Mürren when conditions permit. Prior to 2018, it was run on New Years Day, but is now takes place on New Year's Eve at the end of the skiing day. It is organised by the Kandahar Ski Club.

== History ==
The race was first run in 1925 for a cup offered by J. G. Scaramanga, an original member of the Kandahar Ski Club. The object of the race was to encourage "roped running" to improve safety on glaciers.

The first race was run on the 2 February 1925 and the competitors were Arnold Lunn and A. P. Allinson, C. J. Scaramanga and J. A. Joannides, Duncan Harvey and Charles Wenham, and John Mercer and A. H. d'Egville. The winners were Arnold Lunn and A.P. Allinson. The original race consisted of a slalom section and a downhill section, with the timings of the slalom section being used to calculate the starting times for the downhill section.

== Today ==
The race has departed somewhat from its glacier skiing roots. Some competitors still race to arrive at the finish first, while others race in fancy dress. There is a mass start at the Maulerhubel with an uncontrolled descent to the finish at Winteregg. In excess of twenty pairs of skiers of all ages compete. The challenge for the racers is not become entangled in their own or other's ropes.

The trophy is awarded to the fastest team, but there are also prizes for placed teams and for fancy dress.
