= Lauterbrunnen Via Ferrata =

Hike in Switzerland

The Via Ferrata Mürren–Gimmelwald, also known as the Lauterbrunnen Via Ferrata, is a fixed climbing route in the Bernese Oberland region of Switzerland. It connects the mountain villages of Mürren and Gimmelwald, descending the steep cliffs of the Lauterbrunnen Valley. The route is known for its alpine scenery, vertical exposure, and accessibility to recreational climbers.

== Overview ==
The Mürren–Gimmelwald Via Ferrata is approximately 2.2 kilometres (1.4 mi) long and descends about 400 metres (1,300 ft) from start to finish. It is graded K3 to K4 on the Hüsler scale (moderate to difficult) and typically takes two to three hours to complete.

== Route and features ==
The route begins on the southern edge of Mürren at an elevation of around 1,650 metres (5,410 ft) and ends near Gimmelwald at 1,360 metres (4,460 ft). It is equipped with steel cables, iron rungs, and ladders that aid climbers while providing continuous protection.

A signature feature of the route is the Nepal Bridge, a 90-metre (295 ft) suspension bridge crossing a gorge above the Mürrenbach waterfall. Other notable sections include narrow cliff traverses, vertical ladders, and an optional zip line. The route provides panoramic views of the Eiger, Mönch, and Jungfrau peaks, as well as the Lauterbrunnen Valley below.

== Safety and access ==
The route can be completed independently by experienced participants or with a certified mountain guide.

The via ferrata is typically open from June to October, depending on snow and weather conditions. Mürren and Gimmelwald are accessible by cable car and train via the Lauterbrunnen Valley.

== History ==
The Via Ferrata Mürren–Gimmelwald was completed in 2008 by local guides and outdoor enthusiasts to create a new alpine adventure experience in the Jungfrau Region. Since its opening, it has become one of Switzerland's best-known via ferrata routes, attracting both domestic and international visitors.

== Tourism and environment ==
The route contributes to regional tourism as part of the wider Jungfrau area, which includes hiking, skiing, and paragliding. The via ferrata's design allows visitors to experience the vertical limestone cliffs of the Lauterbrunnen Valley while minimizing environmental impact. Visitors are encouraged to follow Leave No Trace principles and respect local conservation guidelines.

== See also ==
- Via ferrata
- Mürren
- Gimmelwald
- Lauterbrunnen Valley
- Bernese Oberland
