= Mürren =

Mountain village in Switzerland

- Former municipality
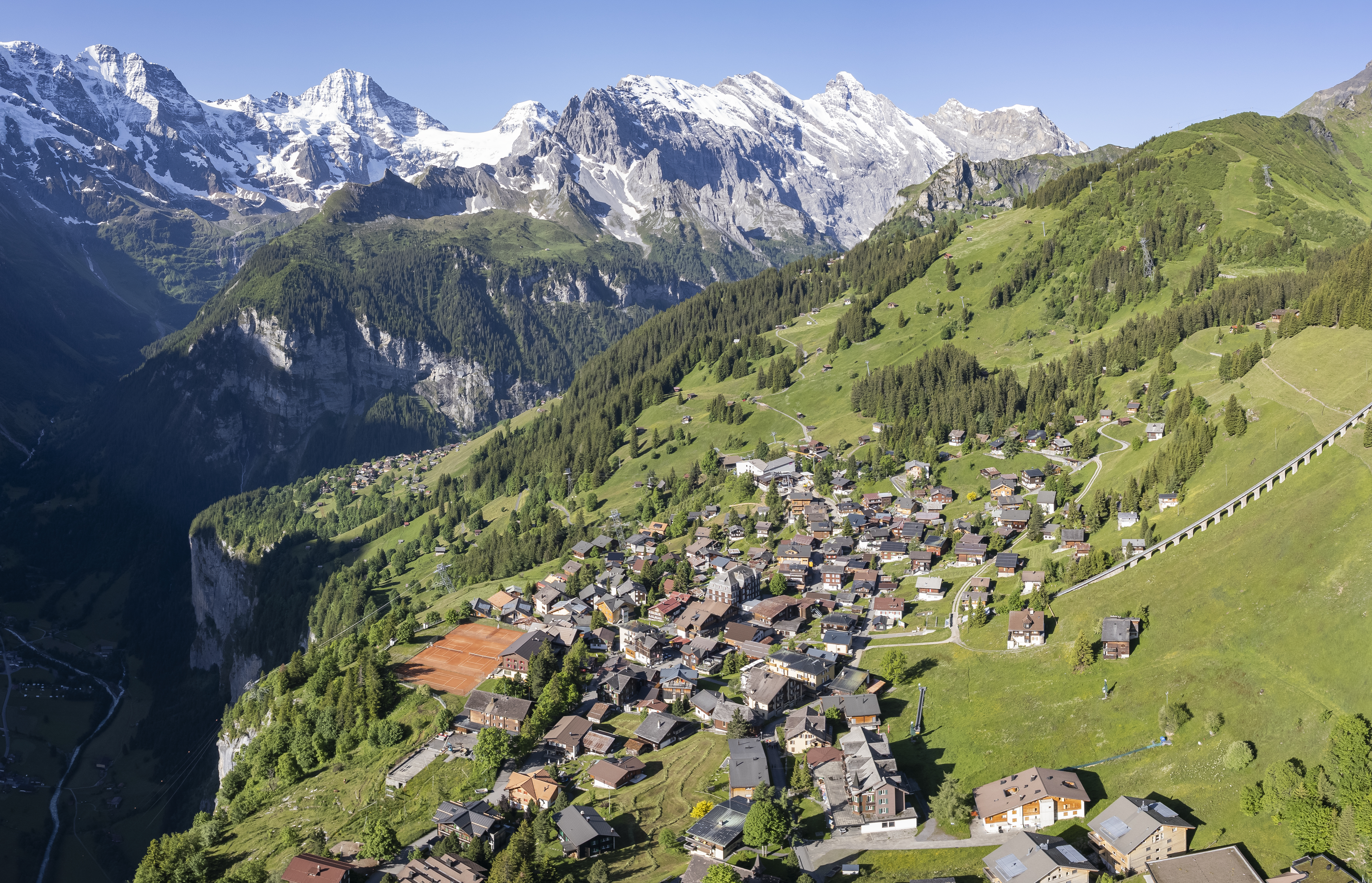
- The village in 2022

- Flag Coat of arms
- Location of Mürren
- Location within Switzerland Location within Canton of Bern
- Coordinates: 46°33′34″N 7°53′32″E
- Country: Switzerland
- Canton: Bern
- District: Interlaken-Oberhasli
- Municipality: Lauterbrunnen

Area
  - Total: 10.5 km^{2} (4.1 sq mi)
- Elevation: 1,638 m (5,374 ft)

Population (December 2025)
  - Total: 430
  - Density: 41/km^{2} (110/sq mi)
- Time zone: UTC+01:00 (CET)
  - Summer (DST): UTC+02:00 (CEST)
- Postal code: 3825
- ISO 3166 code: CH-BE
- Website: muerren.swiss/en/

Mürren (Swiss Standard German pronunciation: [ˈmʏrən]) is a traditional Walser mountain village in the Bernese Highlands of Switzerland, at an elevation of 1,638 m (5,374 ft) above sea level. It cannot be reached by public road. It is also a popular tourist spot in Switzerland, and summer and winter are the seasons when Mürren becomes busy with tourists. The village features a view of the three towering mountains Eiger, Mönch, and Jungfrau. Mürren has a year-round population of 430, but has 2000 hotel beds.

Mürren has its own school and two churches, one Reformed and one Roman Catholic.

== History ==
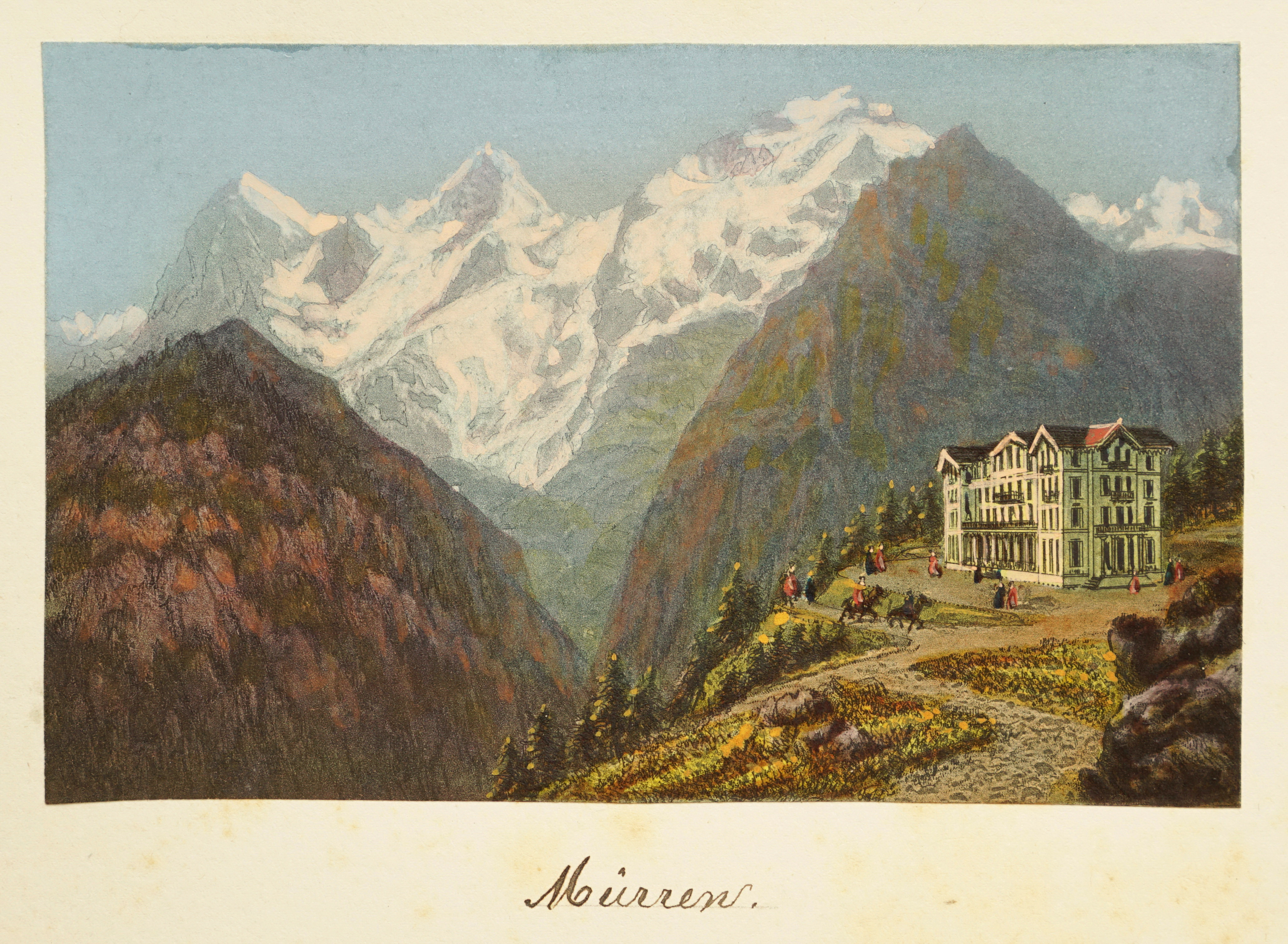
Mürren c. 1875 (in the background: Eiger, Mönch and Jungfrau). Etching by Heinrich Müller

Mürren is first mentioned in 1257 as Mons Murren (Mount Murren). It was probably an alpine pasture until the settlement of immigrants from Lötschental shortly after 1300.

The first hotel was built in 1857 by Mürren's farming cooperative, the Bäuert. Before the opening of the Lauterbrunnen–Mürren Mountain Railway in 1891, guests could reach Mürren only by means of mule traffic. Nevertheless, the quickly growing resort already had 310 hotel beds around 1888. Up to World War I, mainly British tourists came to Mürren. An Anglican church was erected for them as early as 1878.

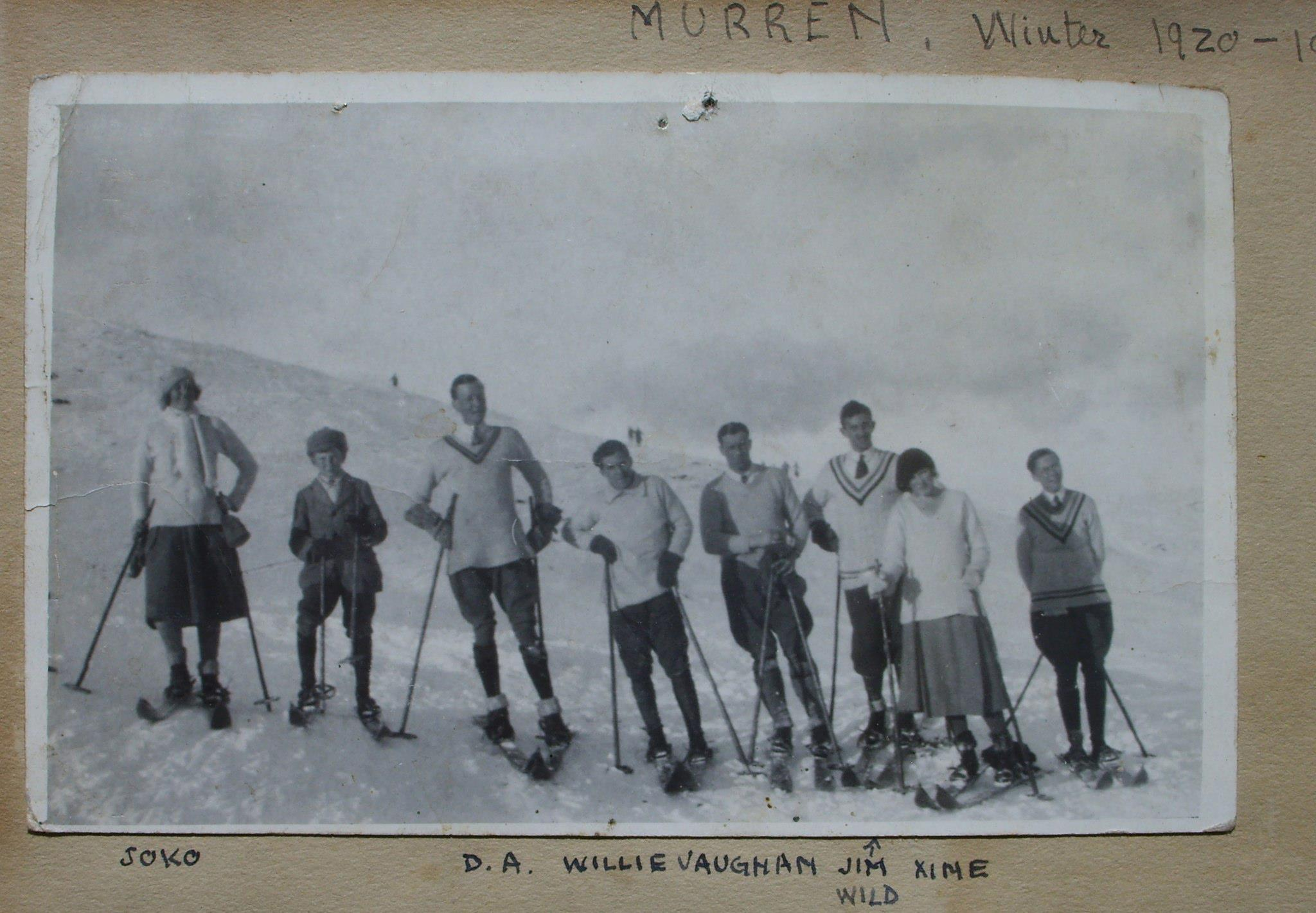
Donald Clive Anderson skiing with Wellie Vaughan, Jim Wild, Xine, Soko in Murren, Switzerland, Winter 1920/1921

Winter sports have been an important part of Mürren's history since the first British winter tourists arrived in 1911. During the First World War wounded prisoners of war stayed here pending repatriation and played a role in developing winter sports. In 1924, the Kandahar Ski Club was set up by Sir Arnold Lunn (whose statue stands outside the rail station) and eight other British skiers. The club takes its name from the Roberts of Kandahar Challenge Cup, first run in 1911. This, the world's senior challenge cup for downhill ski-racing, was presented by Lord Roberts, who won the Battle of Kandahar in the Second Anglo-Afghan War.

== Politics ==
Mürren is situated in the canton of Bern, in the district of Interlaken-Oberhasli and belongs to the municipality of Lauterbrunnen, together with the villages of Wengen, Isenfluh, Gimmelwald and Stechelberg.

== Transport ==
The village is car-free. Mürren station is the terminus of the Bergbahn Lauterbrunnen-Mürren, which consists of a cable car and a connecting narrow gauge railway and connects Mürren to Lauterbrunnen railway station.

A series of four cable cars, known as the Luftseilbahn Stechelberg-Mürren-Schilthorn (LSMS), provides transportation from Mürren downhill to Gimmelwald and Stechelberg, and uphill to the summit of the Schilthorn and the revolving restaurant Piz Gloria. The Mürren station for these cable cars is approximately 800 metres (2600 ft) south-west of the railway station at the other end of Mürren.

In December of 2024 a new cable car segment opened connecting Mürren directly to Stechelberg as part of a large rehabilitation project of the entire Stechelberg - Mürren - Schilthorn cable car system. It replaced an older direct cable car that was primarily only used to transport freight. The new direct cable car transports both passengers and freight. The project also replaced the Mürren to Birg and Birg to Schilthorn cable cars with new wind resistant cable cars of the Funifor design. The original Stechelberg - Gimmelwald and Gimmelwald - Mürren Von Roll cable cars remain in service to provide transportation access to Gimmelwald and as an alternate route to Stechelberg.

Mürren is also the lower terminus of the Allmendhubelbahn, a funicular.

The Lauterbrunnen Via Ferrata climbing route connects the village to Gimmelwald.

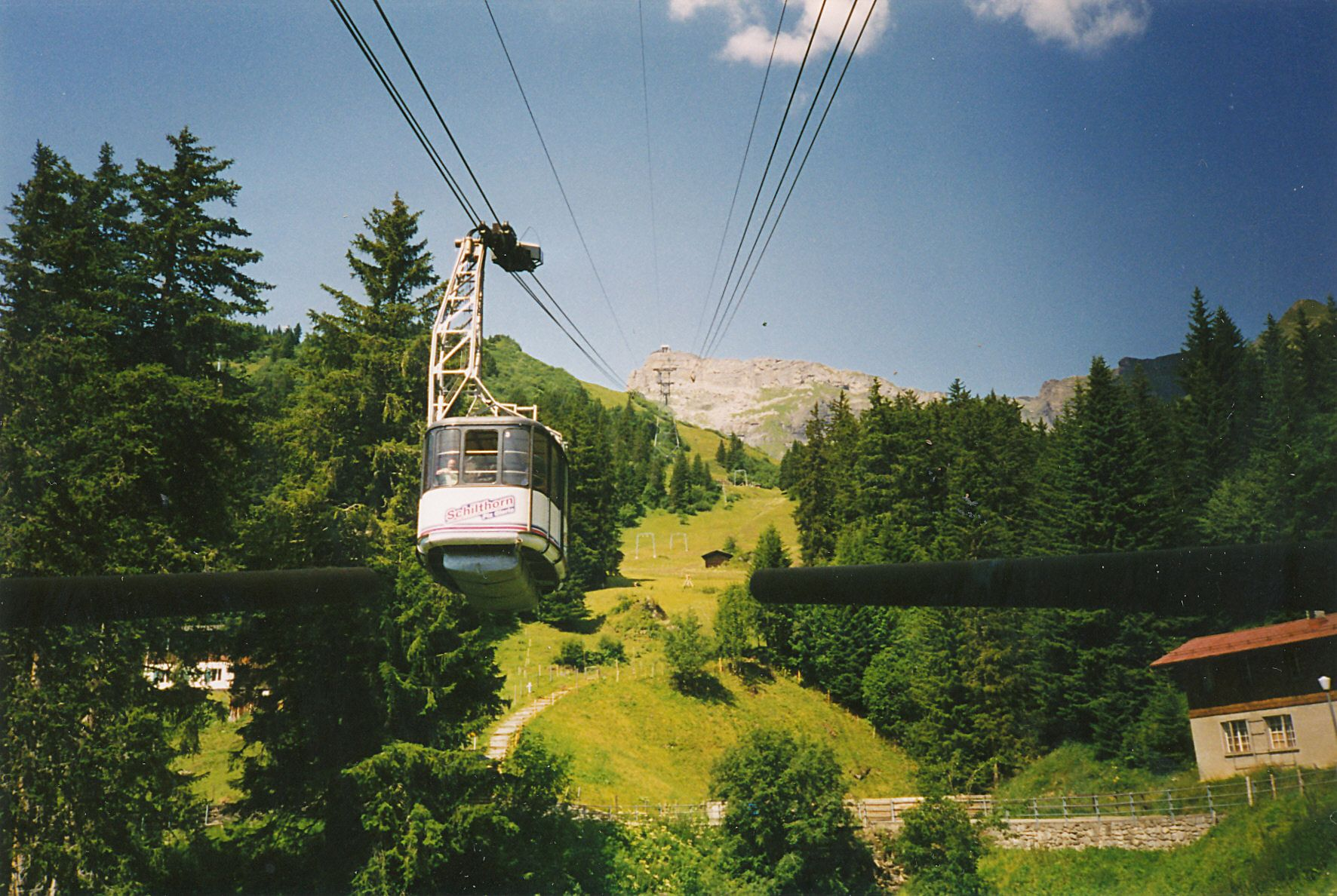
The cable car to Schilthorn

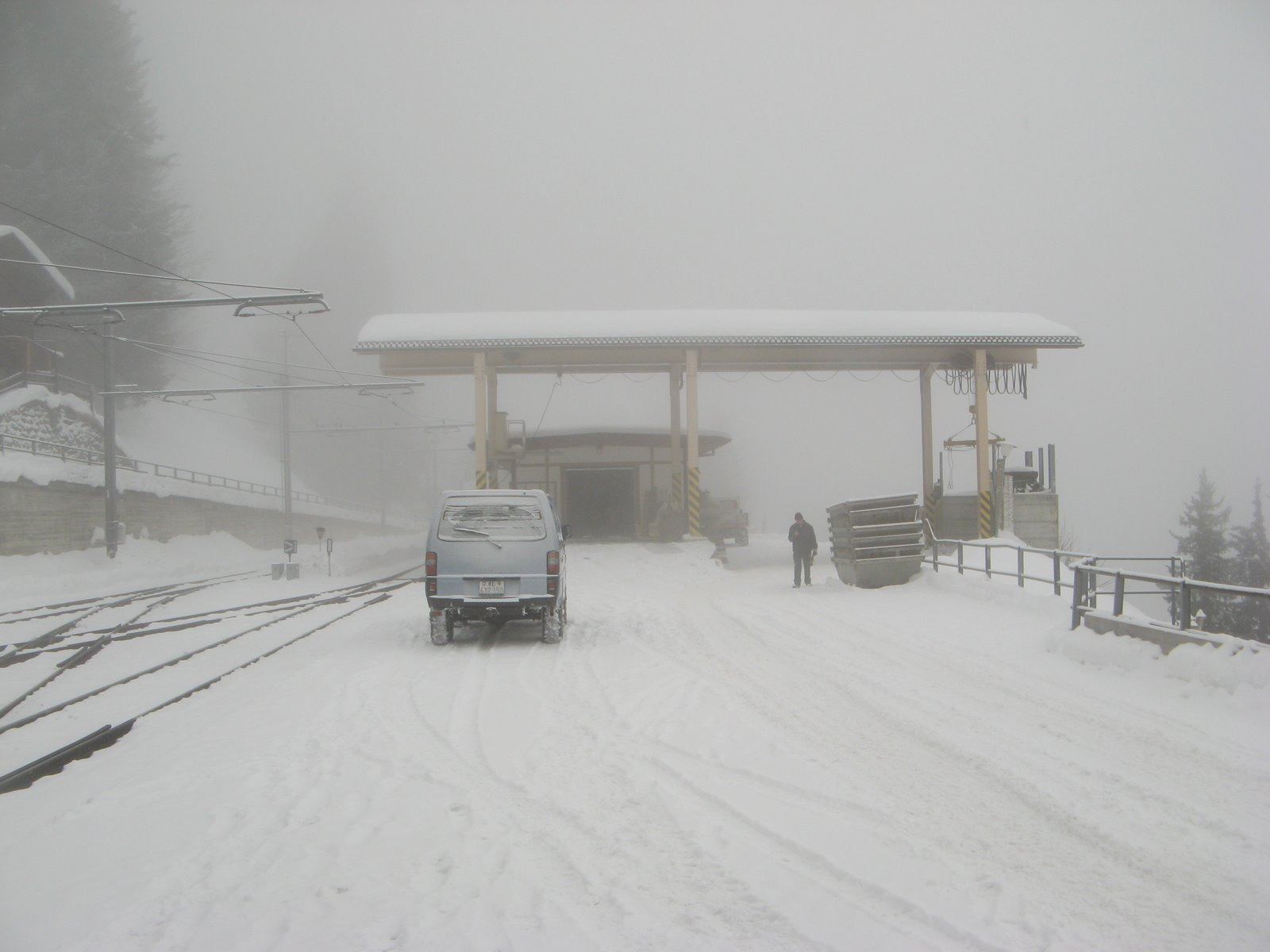
Mürren Railway Station during winter

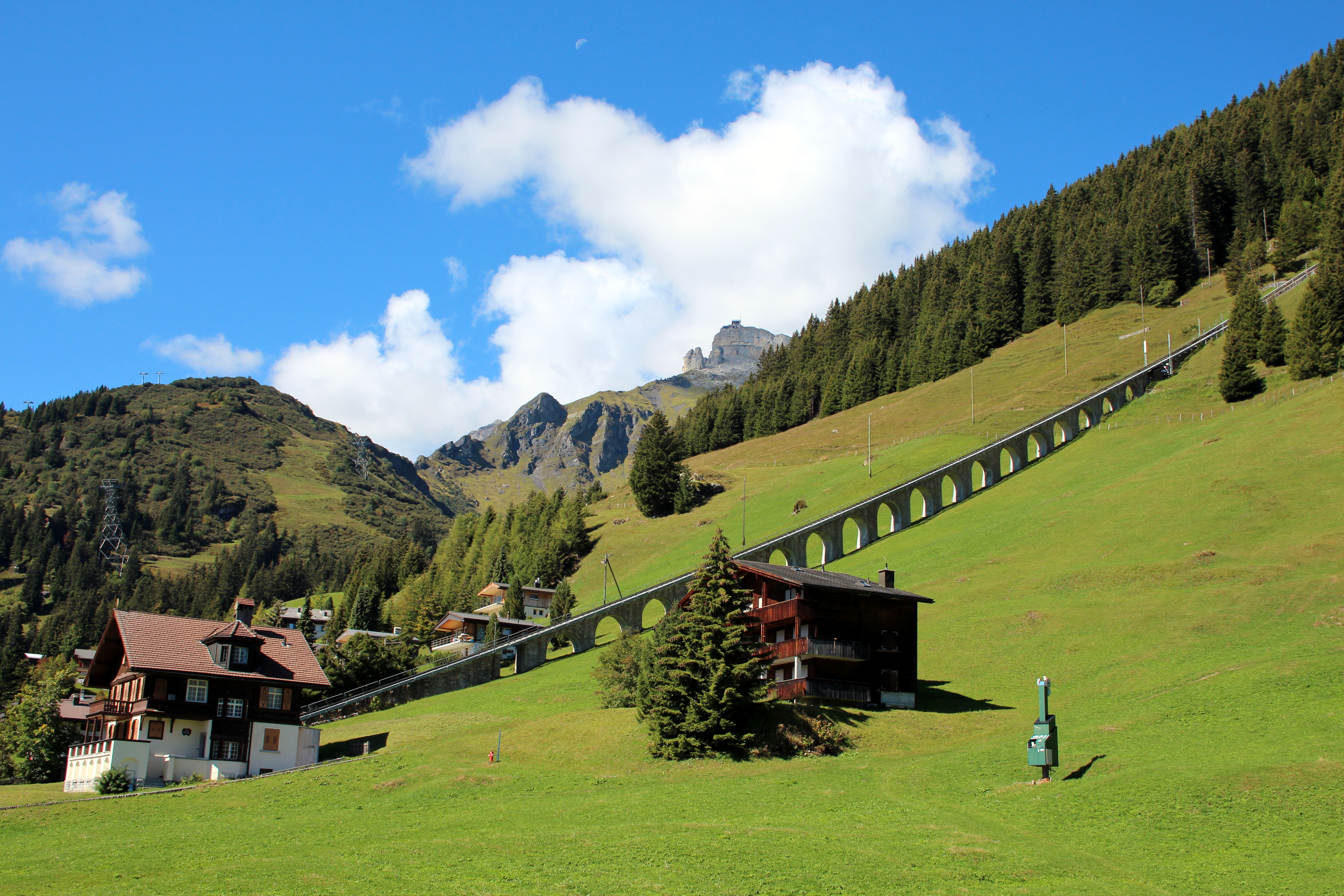
The Allmendhubelbahn funicular

== Recreation ==
In the ski area, there are a total of 52 kilometres (32 mi) of ski runs with 14 ski lifts (six cable cars, seven chair lifts, three railways, and two drag lifts). There is also off-piste skiing, but guiding is often needed and should be used.

Within the village there is a large sports center with a 25m swimming pool, sports hall, fitness room, café, information centre and other facilities. There is a large skating rink which is sometimes used for curling competitions as well as a specific curling rink that in the summer is a tennis court. The ice rink is turned into a mini-golf course during the summer months. In the summer, there are also tennis courts near the sports chalet, located at 1650 metres (5410 ft) above sea level, they are some of the highest altitude tennis courts in the world.

There are several hiking trails and mountain bike routes. The nearby Mürrenbach Falls, Switzerland's highest waterfall, are a popular tourist attraction.

== Hotels ==
There are many hotels in Mürren, including the Hotel Alpenblick, Hotel Alpenruh, Alpina, Hotel Bellevue, Hotel Blumental, Hotel Edelweiss, Hotel Eiger, Eiger Guesthouse, Hotel Jungfrau, Hotel Regina and Sportschalet.

== Highlights and events ==
In 1928, the Inferno Race was set up, and continues to this day. The International Inferno Race, comprising cross-country, giant slalom, and downhill races, is the longest (15.8 km / 9.8 mi) and largest amateur ski race in the world, with a limit of 1800 participants. It is held in January. The fastest entrants complete the 15.8 km from the Schilthorn to Lauterbrunnen in only 15 minutes.

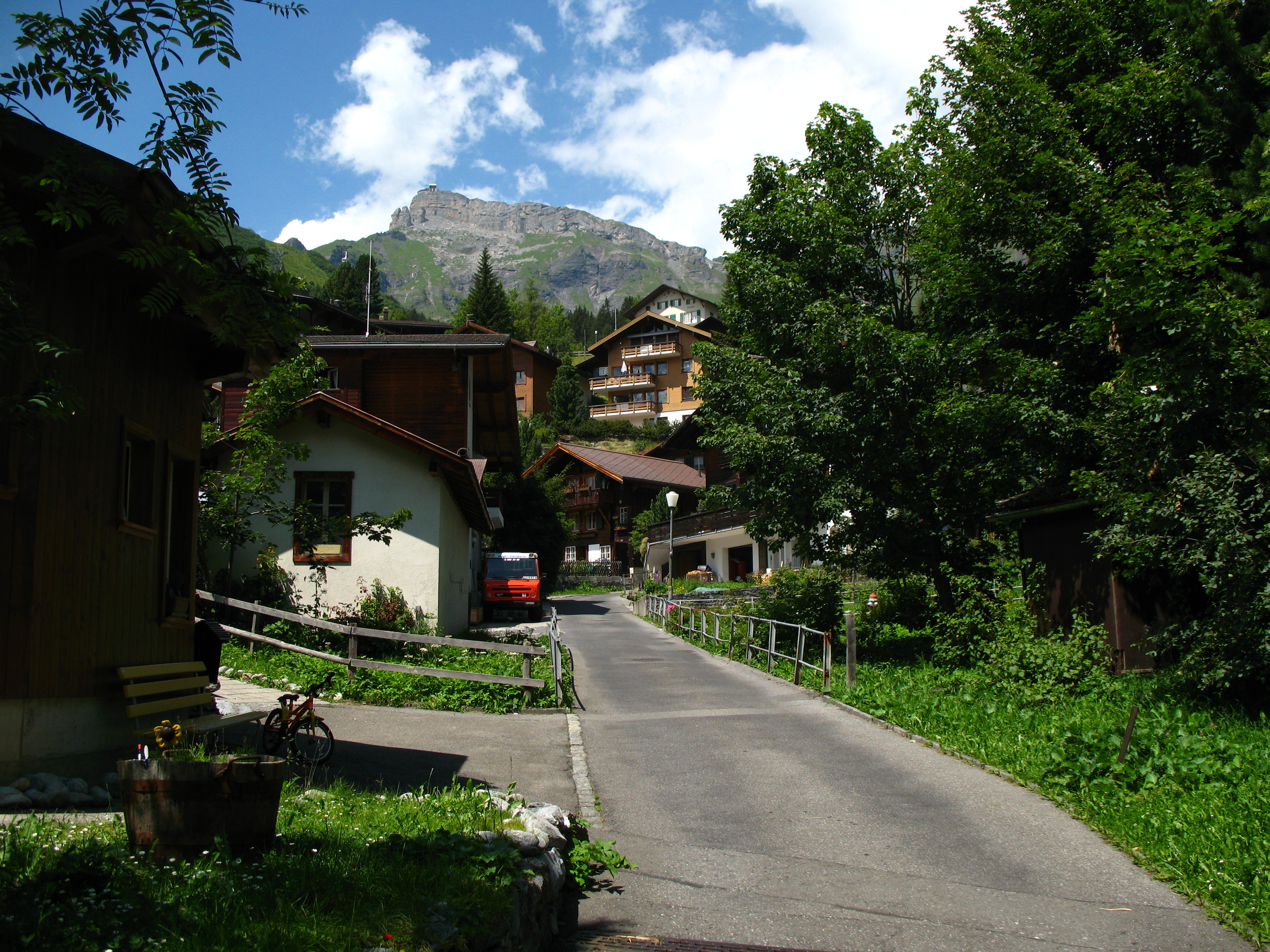
Street in Mürren

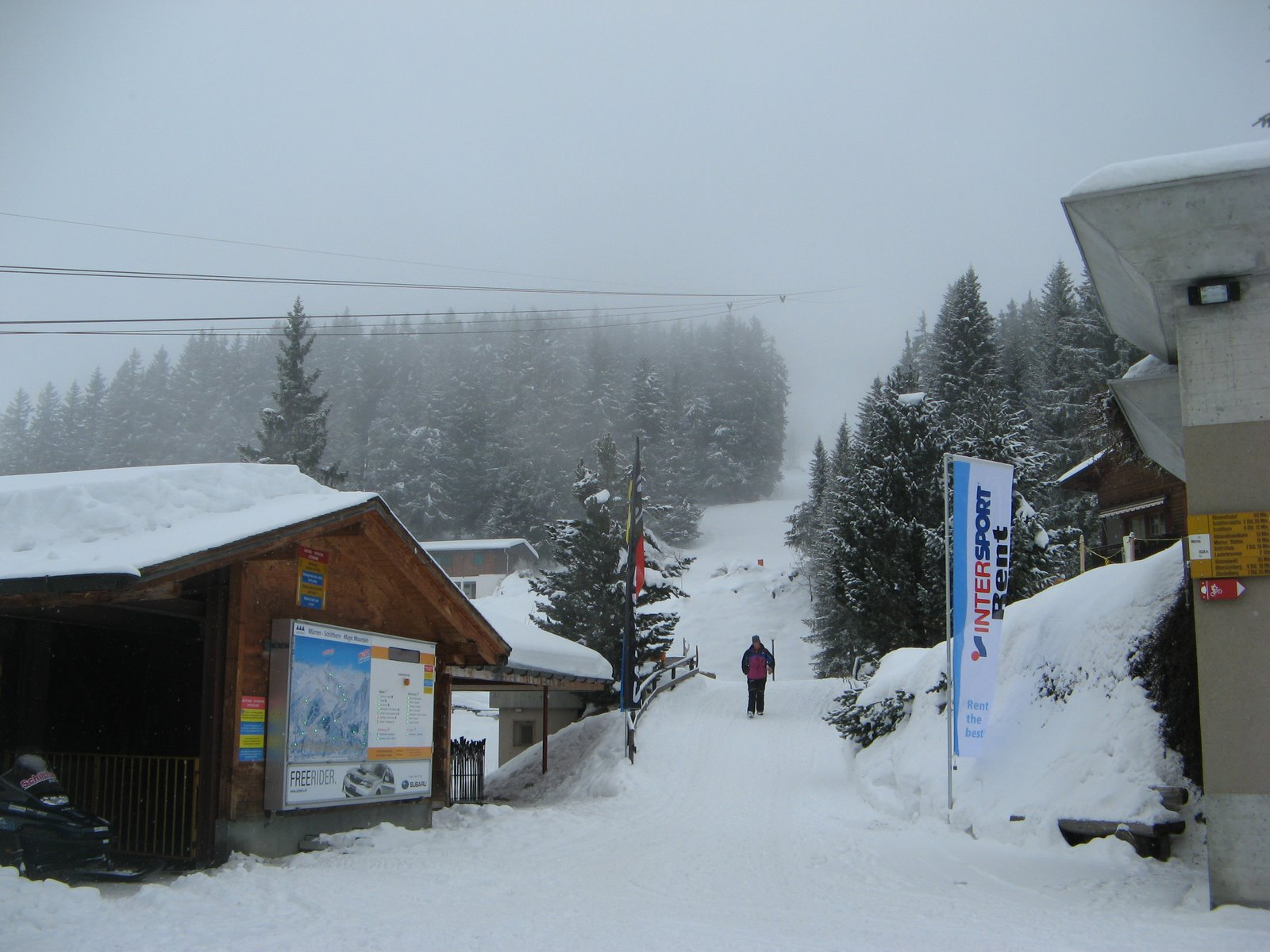
Street in Mürren in winter

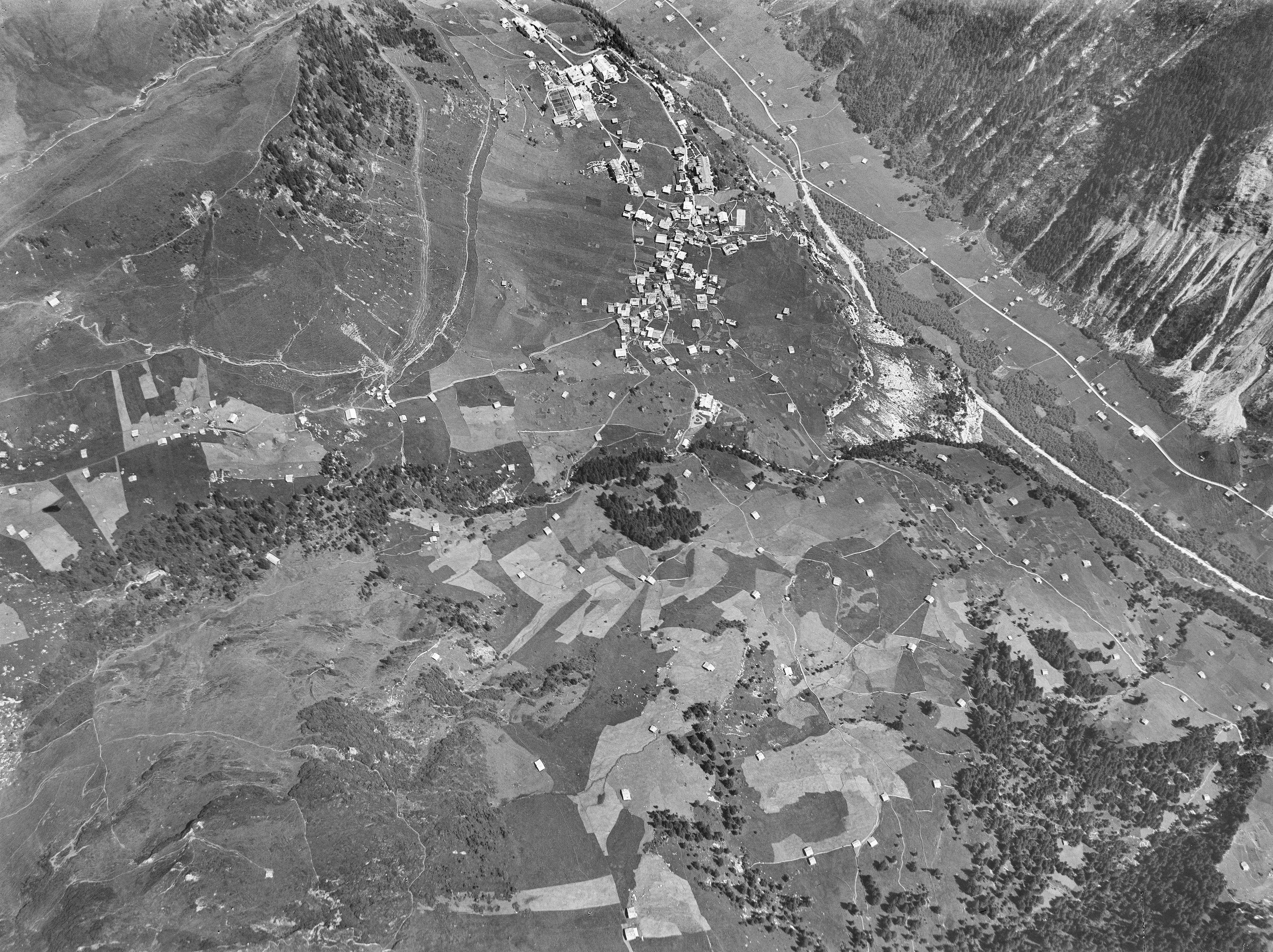
Aerial view by Eduard Spelterini, between 1893 and 1924

== In popular culture ==
The top station of the Schilthorn cable car (Piz Gloria) was a principal filming location for the James Bond movie On Her Majesty's Secret Service, released in 1969, in which fictional spy James Bond (George Lazenby) made his escape from the headquarters of Ernst Stavro Blofeld (Telly Savalas) and fled four of Blofeld's henchmen in a car driven by his girlfriend Tracy (Diana Rigg).

In November 2025, Mürren was featured in an article of the BBC.
