= Mała Rawka =

Mountain peak in Poland

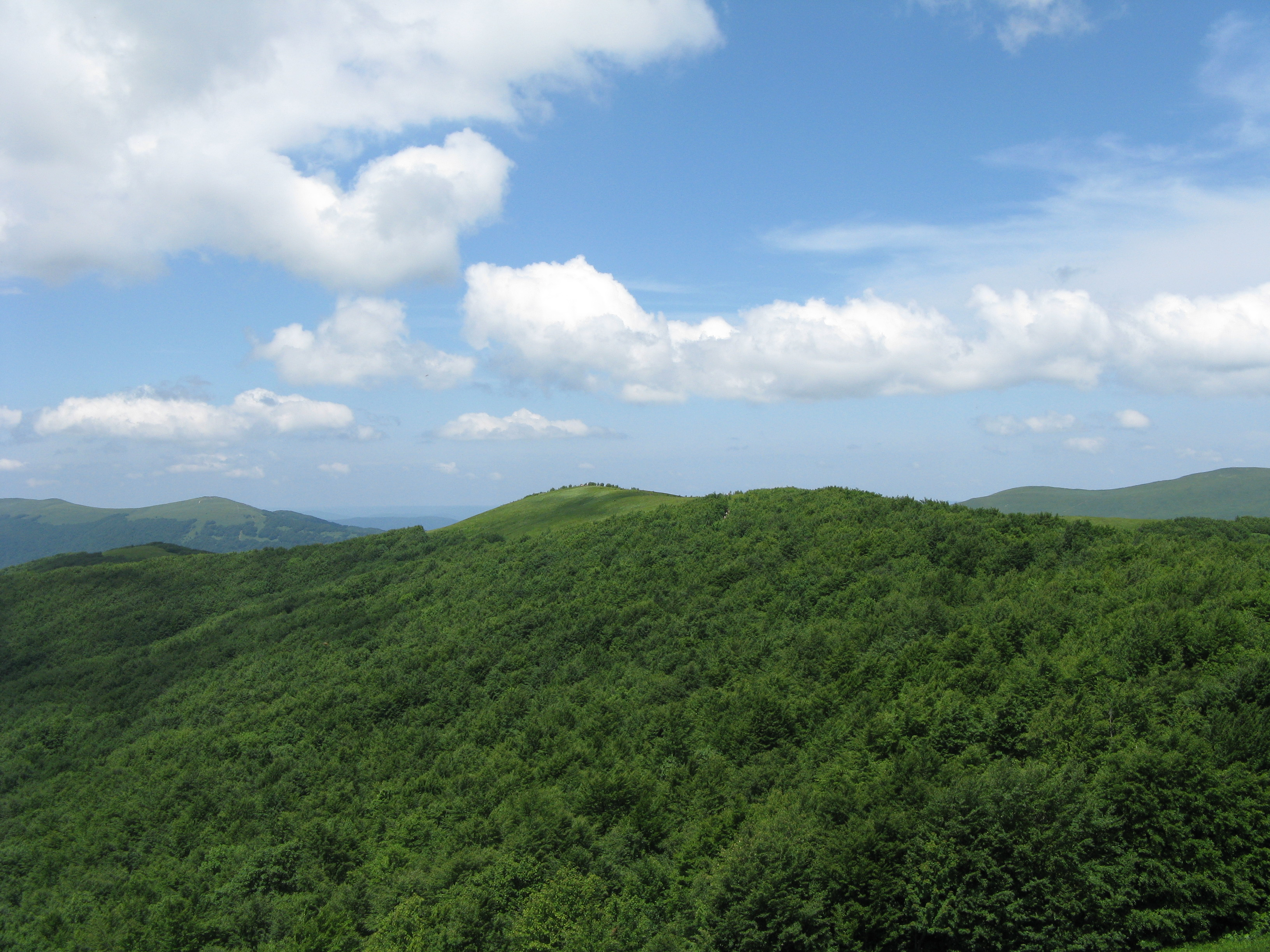

Highest point
- Elevation: 1,272 m (4,173 ft)
- Prominence: 19 m (62 ft)
- Coordinates: 49°6′33″N 22°34′28″E

Geography
- Location within Subcarpathian Voivodeship Location within Poland
- Location: Podkarpacie, Poland
- Parent range: Bieszczady Mountains

Mała Rawka is a peak in the western Bieszczady Mountains, near Ustrzyki Górne, in southern Poland. Its height is 1,272 metres.

To the north-east, a ridge runs from it, through Wyżniańska Przełęcz, running towards Połonina Caryńska. It lies 15 minutes by mountain trail from Wielka Rawka, separated from it by a high pass (1254 m), where the highest forest in the Polish Bieszczady grows. Its top is covered by a small pasture, which is an excellent vantage point for the most famous Bieszczady massifs: the Tarnica group, Połonina Wetlińska and Caryńska. Conquering Mała Rawka involves overcoming the elevation of about 300 meters from its foot.

Of the rare plant species in Poland, the occurrence of Carpathian tocia and rock bird cherry has been found in the peak.

== See also ==
- Bieszczady National Park
