= Stechelberg =

Village in Switzerland

- Municipality
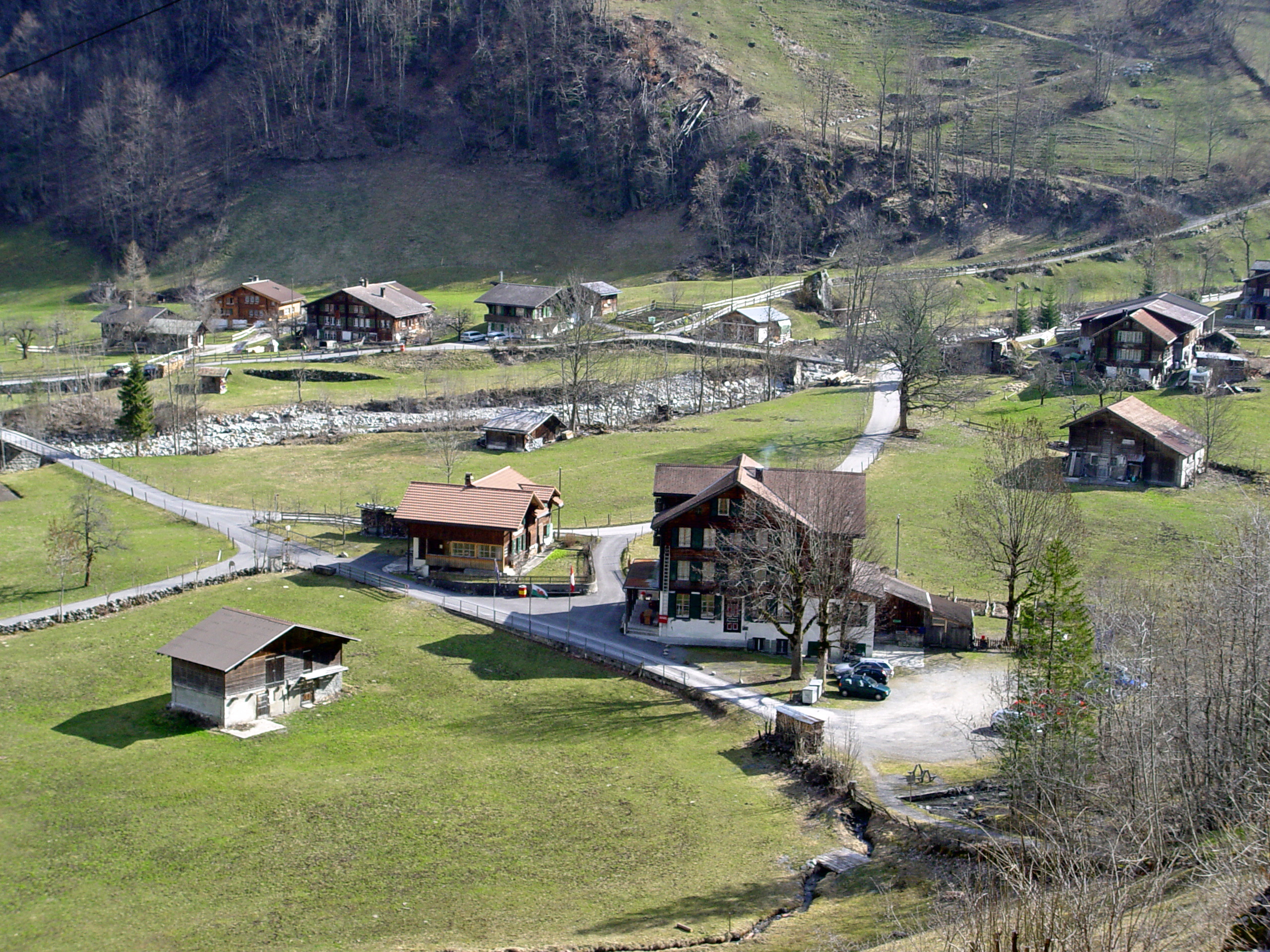
- Stechelberg in 2007

- Flag Coat of arms
- Location of Stechelberg
- Location within Switzerland Location within Canton of Bern
- Coordinates: 46°32′59″N 7°54′5″E
- Country: Switzerland
- Canton: Bern
- District: Interlaken-Oberhasli
- Municipality: Lauterbrunnen

Area
  - Total: 50.9 km^{2} (19.7 sq mi)
- Elevation: 922 m (3,025 ft)

Population (December 2025)
  - Total: 204
  - Density: 4.01/km^{2} (10.4/sq mi)
- Time zone: UTC+01:00 (CET)
  - Summer (DST): UTC+02:00 (CEST)
- Postal code: 3824
- ISO 3166 code: CH-BE
- Website: http://www.stechelberg.ch/

Stechelberg (Swiss Standard German pronunciation: [ˈʃtɛçl̩ˌbɛrɡ]) is a small village in Switzerland located at the base of the Schwarzmönch mountain in the Bernese Alps, part of the district of Lauterbrunnen.

== History ==
The name "Stächelbärg" is first recorded in 1749 to describe this part of the valley. Stechelberg was primarily utilised for iron ore mining and smelting, with facilities at Sichellauenen and Trachsellauenen. A painting of 1790 by Johann Niklaus Schie showed that the latter facility comprised 18 gallery roofs, and a widely deforested area. In 1805 Hans Conrad Escher, a civil engineer and geologist from Zurich (builder of the Linth Canal) was tasked by the Bernese government with evaluating the productivity of the plant. Based on his assessment, mining was officially suspended, although the mine continued to be operated on a smaller scale by locals until around 1860. Since then, reforestation programmes have largely restored the area around the village, which has been declared a protected natural area.

Stechelberg has been known to suffer from avalanches. In 2003, during heavy snowfall Stechelberg suffered multiple avalanches that led to the evacuation of residents and tourists. In May 2023, mountaineer Kacper Tekieli was killed in an avalanche. Several days later, three Dutch tourists, including mountaineer Line van den Berg, were also found dead after a suspected avalanche prior to their climb of the Grosshorn mountain. The village has multiple permanent shelters, and a siren alert system, to protect residents in the event of an occurrence.

== Transport ==
Stechelberg is connected via a single road to the town of Lauterbrunnen. The bus route 141 also utilises the road, stopping twice in Stechelberg at Stechelberg Hotel and the Schilthornbahn station. The bus runs every 30 minutes.

The village is connected by the Luftseilbahn Stechelberg-Mürren-Schilthorn (LSMS), an aerial tramway constructed in 1965. As part of the 20XX project, a brand new cable car was constructed by Schilthornbahn AG to connect Stechelberg to Mürren. The previous cable car, via Gimmelwald, remains in service. Opened in December 2024, the new cable car is the steepest in the world.

== Sport ==
The only sports facility of significance in Stechelberg, is a 16km cross country ski route between the village and Lauterbrunnen.
