= List of actors considered for the James Bond character =

This is a list of actors who were considered for the role of James Bond, both officially and unofficially, but did not play the role of agent 007. The separate list of James Bond films details the actors who have played the role of agent 007.

== Considered but not chosen ==
Actors who were under consideration for the role of James Bond but not chosen.

Actor	Film	Year	Reason
Trevor Howard	Dr. No	1961	He was first considered by Kevin McClory for the abandoned Longitude 78 West film project, which was later revamped into the novel Thunderball. However, Ian Fleming disagreed, feeling that at 43 years old, he was too old for the role. He was later considered again by Albert R. Broccoli for the film Dr. No.
Stanley Baker	Dr. No	1961	He was unwilling to commit to a three-picture contract.
Rex Harrison	Dr. No	1961	He was turned down in favour of Sean Connery.
David Niven	Dr. No	1961	He was turned down in favour of Connery (later played Bond in the 1967 parody Casino Royale) (Fleming's personal choice).
Richard Todd	Dr. No	1961	He was Fleming's first choice for the role, but scheduling conflicts prevented him from getting it.
Jeremy Brett	On Her Majesty's Secret Service	1967	He feared the role would harm his career.
Peter Purves	On Her Majesty's Secret Service	1967	Prior to becoming a Blue Peter presenter, Purves auditioned for the role of 007 but was unsuccessful.
Michael Caine	On Her Majesty's Secret Service	1967	He did not want to be typecast in spy films, having previously starred in the three Harry Palmer spy films.
Robert Campbell	On Her Majesty's Secret Service	1967	George Lazenby won the role based on a screen-test fight scene.
Michael Bishop	On Her Majesty's Secret Service	1967	Father of comedian Des Bishop, who later wrote his biography, titled My Dad Was Nearly James Bond.
Patrick Mower	On Her Majesty's Secret Service	1967	Reason unknown.
Daniel Pilon	On Her Majesty's Secret Service	1967	Harry Saltzman felt he was too young; aged 27 at the time.
John Richardson	On Her Majesty's Secret Service	1967	George Lazenby won the role based on a screen-test fight scene.
Anthony Rogers	On Her Majesty's Secret Service	1967	George Lazenby won the role based on a screen-test fight scene.
Terence Stamp	On Her Majesty's Secret Service	1967	His ideas for future films felt too radical for producer Harry Saltzman.
Hans De Vries	On Her Majesty's Secret Service	1967	George Lazenby won the role based on a screen-test fight scene.
Eric Braeden	On Her Majesty's Secret Service	1968	Albert R. Broccoli at first thought he was British and so considered him. However, Broccoli, who believed that no one from outside the Commonwealth would be suitable as James Bond, decided against him after finding he was German American.
Peter Snow	On Her Majesty's Secret Service	1968	He auditioned for On Her Majesty's Secret Service but was rejected by Broccoli and Saltzman for being too tall (6'5").
Oliver Reed	On Her Majesty's Secret Service	1969	The producers did not want to spend the time or money needed to reshape Reed's poor public image.
Timothy Dalton	On Her Majesty's Secret Service	1969–1972	He thought himself too young and did not wish to follow Connery. He declined the role again in 1979, before finally being cast in 1986.
Roger Green	Diamonds Are Forever	1970	He filmed a screen test with Imogen Hassall, but was turned down in favour of Connery.
Simon Dee	Live and Let Die	1971	Put forward to follow Sean Connery (despite being thought of by most people as a talk show host, rather than an actor).
William Gaunt	Live and Let Die	1971	Auditioned for the role as Bond for Live and Let Die but lost the role to Roger Moore.
John Gavin	Diamonds Are Forever, Live and Let Die	1971, 1973	Was signed as the first American Bond after George Lazenby quit, but Sean Connery decided to return to the role instead. He was considered again for Live and Let Die, but was denied as producers felt Bond should remain British.
Simon Oates	Diamonds Are Forever, Live and Let Die	1971, 1973	Was strongly considered but turned down when Sean Connery returned and was working on other projects when Roger Moore was selected.
Ranulph Fiennes	Live and Let Die	1972	For having "hands too big and a face like a farmer".
Peter Laughton	Live and Let Die	1972	Broccoli remarked that he would have been chosen had he auditioned for On Her Majesty's Secret Service. However, following the casting of Lazenby, the producers were wary of choosing actors with limited or no acting experience and decided to settle with Moore.
Guy Peters	Live and Let Die	1972	The producers wanted to cast an actor with a "known face".
Timothy Dalton	For Your Eyes Only	1979	Turned the role down for a second time as he did not like the direction the series was taking. He would eventually be cast in 1986 for The Living Daylights.
David Warbeck	For Your Eyes Only	1979	Was under contract to Eon as a 'reserve Bond' in case Moore quit, but Moore returned.
Michael Jayston	For Your Eyes Only	1980	Role up for grabs when Roger Moore was considering quitting but Moore returned. Jayston eventually portrayed the character in 1990 for a two-part BBC radio drama.
Patrick Mower	For Your Eyes Only	1980	Auditioned when Roger Moore was considering quitting, but Moore returned
Lewis Collins	Octopussy	1982	Collins claims the producers thought he was too aggressive.
Ian Ogilvy	Octopussy	1983	Roger Moore agreed to return.
James Brolin	Octopussy	1983	Screen-tested for Octopussy, was lined up for the part, even going so far as buying a house in London for the production, before Roger Moore once again agreed to return.
Pierce Brosnan	The Living Daylights	1986	Became front runner for The Living Daylights after Timothy Dalton could not take the part due to his commitment to Brenda Starr. However, Brosnan's option to star in a further season of Remington Steele was taken up by NBC, and Eon refused to have him do both Steele and Bond at the same time. Fortuitously, Dalton became available again at just that time, and so reaccepted the role, which he played until 1989. Brosnan would later play Bond from GoldenEye through to Die Another Day.
Daniel Pilon	The Living Daylights	1986	Timothy Dalton was chosen for the role.
Sam Neill	The Living Daylights	1986	Although he impressed producers as Reilly, Ace of Spies, Neill lost out to Timothy Dalton for this iteration of Bond.
Antony Hamilton	The Living Daylights	1986	Was in negotiations with the producers before Timothy Dalton was chosen.
Mel Gibson	The Living Daylights	1987	Metro-Goldwyn-Mayer wanted him for the role, but was rejected by Broccoli for not being British.
Christopher Lambert	The Living Daylights	1987	French accent prevented him from being chosen.
Neil Dickson	The Living Daylights	1987	Timothy Dalton was chosen.
Mark Greenstreet	The Living Daylights	1987	Told Terry Wogan in an interview that he was given a screen test for Bond but lost out to Timothy Dalton.
Finlay Light	The Living Daylights	1987	The little-known Australian model was one of the main contenders for the role in The Living Daylights, even signing a ten-year contract. Timothy Dalton was chosen anyway.
Andrew Clarke	The Living Daylights	1987	One of the most popular Australian actors of the 1980s, Clarke was considered but lost out to Dalton.
Simon MacCorkindale	The Living Daylights	1987	Timothy Dalton was chosen.
Sean Bean	GoldenEye	1994	Was the second choice for Eon if Timothy Dalton did not return; however, MGM overruled on both counts, and Pierce Brosnan was given the part. The producers were still impressed, and gave him the part of the villain Alec Trevelyan, rewritten from its original mentor part to become a direct parallel of Bond as Agent 006.
Mark Frankel	GoldenEye	1994	Pierce Brosnan was chosen for the role.
Paul McGann	GoldenEye	1994	Was given an audition and impressed producers; however, MGM still insisted on Pierce Brosnan for the role. It is believed that McGann would have stepped in if Brosnan turned down the role.
Lambert Wilson	GoldenEye	1994	Pierce Brosnan was chosen for the role.
Hugh Grant	GoldenEye	1994	Pierce Brosnan was chosen for the role.
Henry Cavill	Casino Royale	2005	The preferred choice of director Martin Campbell; however, was deemed too young to portray Bond.
Sam Worthington	Casino Royale	2005	Daniel Craig was chosen for the role.
Rupert Friend	Casino Royale	2005	Daniel Craig was chosen for the role.
Julian McMahon	Casino Royale	2005	Daniel Craig was chosen for the role.
Matthew Rhys	Casino Royale	2005	Did not impress the producers.
Alex O'Loughlin	Casino Royale	2005	Daniel Craig was chosen for the role. References to Bond were featured in the reboot of Hawaii Five-0 during the first season. The seventh and eighth seasons of the rebooted Hawaii Five-0 feature a recurring MI6 agent portrayed by Chris Vance (as MI6 agent Harry Langford) in 3 episodes.
Clive Owen	Casino Royale	2005	The producers were unwilling to provide gross profit points. In 2006 film The Pink Panther, he is indirectly referenced by playing Nigel Boswell, MI6 agent 006.
Dougray Scott	Casino Royale	2005	Reason unknown.
Goran Višnjić	Casino Royale	2005	Was reportedly unable to master a British accent.
Antony Starr	Casino Royale	2005	Daniel Craig was chosen for the role. His audition tape was leaked along with that of Henry Cavill, Rupert Friend and Sam Worthington.
Nicholas Hoult	Bond 26	2026	In November 2026, it was reported that Hoult and Robert Pattinson would be screen-tested for the part. Pattinson was eventually chosen for the role.
Jack Lowden	Bond 26	2026	Robert Pattinson was chosen for the role.
Josh O'Connor	Bond 26	2026	Robert Pattinson was chosen for the role.
Callum Turner	Bond 26	2026	Robert Pattinson was chosen for the role.

== Considered but declined the role ==
Actors who have come under consideration for the role of James Bond but have declined the offer for various reasons.

Actor		Year considered	Reason
Peter Lawford	Dr. No	1958	Felt he was not offered enough money for the part and was reluctant to agree to a five-picture deal.
Richard Burton	Dr. No	1959	Felt the role was a new untested concept, and wanted more than the producers would pay.
Richard Burton	Dr. No	1961	Felt the role was a new untested concept, and wanted more than the producers would pay.
Cary Grant	Dr. No	1961	Felt he was too old at time being 58; also just wanted to do one film.
Richard Johnson	Dr. No	1961	Terence Young's choice but did not want a contract because he was under contract to MGM.
James Mason	Dr. No	1961	Offered a three-picture contract but turned down the role because he would only agree to do two. Mason was later selected to play the villain Hugo Drax in Moonraker, but the part eventually went to Michael Lonsdale in order to satisfy the requirements of an Anglo-French co-production under the 1965–79 film treaty.
Patrick McGoohan	Dr. No	1961	Felt the role was too promiscuous.
Rod Taylor	Dr. No	1961	Felt the role was beneath him.
Steve Reeves	Dr. No	1962	Wanted more money than the producers would offer.
John Bingham, 7th Earl of Lucan	On Her Majesty's Secret Service	1967	Declined an offer from Albert R. Broccoli to screen test him for the role after he decided not to pursue acting. Would later become infamous when he vanished after his children's nanny was murdered.
Adam West	On Her Majesty's Secret Service	1967	Felt Bond must be British.
Clint Eastwood	Diamonds Are Forever	1970	Felt Bond must be British.
Michael Gambon	Diamonds Are Forever	1970	Felt he did not have good enough looks to play Bond.
Burt Reynolds	Diamonds Are Forever	1970	Felt Bond should be portrayed by a British actor.
Jon Finch	Live and Let Die	1972	Did not want to play the part.
Liam Neeson	GoldenEye	1994	At first, he claimed he was not interested in starring in action films at that time. However, in reality, his girlfriend and later wife Natasha Richardson would not have married him if he took the role.
Dominic West	Casino Royale	2005	Heard a rumour that Pierce Brosnan would return and ruled himself out.
Christian Bale	Casino Royale	Unknown	Considered the franchise to be "very British" and felt that the character embodied "every despicable stereotype about England and British actors." Additionally, he remarked that he had "already played a serial killer" in American Psycho, suggesting he was not interested in taking on the role of Agent 007.

Both Timothy Dalton and Pierce Brosnan were linked to the role at least a decade before taking it but declined for various reason Dalton was offered the role in 1967 at the age of 21 but declined, saying he felt too young for the role in On Her Majesty's Secret Service. Dalton declined the offer again in 1979 because he felt the plot directions of the Bond films were becoming less realistic and more dependent on gadgetry and repeated plot formulas. He finally took the role in 1989 for Licence to Kill. Brosnan at the time had a contractual duty towards Remington Steele. He also auditioned for The Living Daylights, before debutting as Bond in GoldenEye. Roger Moore didn't accept the role for On Her Majesty's Secret Service due to commitment towards another show.

== Considered but chosen for a different role in a Bond film ==
The following actors were considered for the role of James Bond, but were cast as supporting or opposing characters; in the case of Colin Salmon, consideration as Bond came after his appearances in the films.

Actor	Film considered for	Years considered	Film appeared in	Character	Affiliation
George Baker	Dr. No	1961	On Her Majesty’s Secret Service (1969); The Spy Who Loved Me (1977)	Sir Hillary Bray; Captain Benson	College of Arms; Royal Navy
Michael Billington	On Her Majesty's Secret Service	1968	The Spy Who Loved Me (1977)	Sergei Barsov (KGB agent Anya Amasova's lover)	KGB
Michael Billington	Live and Let Die	1972	The Spy Who Loved Me (1977)	Sergei Barsov (KGB agent Anya Amasova's lover)	KGB
Michael Billington	Moonraker	1978	The Spy Who Loved Me (1977)	Sergei Barsov (KGB agent Anya Amasova's lover)	KGB
Michael Billington	For Your Eyes Only	1980	The Spy Who Loved Me (1977)	Sergei Barsov (KGB agent Anya Amasova's lover)	KGB
Michael Billington	Octopussy	1982	The Spy Who Loved Me (1977)	Sergei Barsov (KGB agent Anya Amasova's lover)	KGB
Julian Glover	Live and Let Die	1971	For Your Eyes Only (1981)	Aristotle Kristatos	MI6/KGB (double agent)
Julian Glover	For Your Eyes Only	1979	For Your Eyes Only (1981)	Aristotle Kristatos	MI6/KGB (double agent)
Sean Bean	The Living Daylights	1986	GoldenEye (1995)	Alec Trevelyan	Former MI6 agent 006 turned villain
Sean Bean	GoldenEye	1994	GoldenEye (1995)	Alec Trevelyan	Former MI6 agent 006 turned villain
Ralph Fiennes	GoldenEye	1994	Skyfall (2012); Spectre (2015); No Time to Die (2021)	Gareth Mallory/M	MI6
Ralph Fiennes	Casino Royale	2004	Skyfall (2012); Spectre (2015); No Time to Die (2021)	Gareth Mallory/M	MI6
Colin Salmon	Casino Royale	2004	Tomorrow Never Dies (1997); The World Is Not Enough (1999); Die Another Day (2002)	Charles Robinson	MI6

== See also ==
- Outline of James Bond
