= Lee Lorenz =

American cartoonist (1932–2022)

- Born: October 17, 1932 Hackensack, New Jersey, U.S.
- Died: December 8, 2022 (aged 90)
- Areas: Cartoonist, Editor
- Notable works: The New Yorker cartoons
- Awards: National Cartoonists Society's Gag Cartoon Award (1995)

Lee Sharp Lorenz (October 17, 1932 – December 8, 2022) was an American cartoonist most notable for his work in The New Yorker.

== Early life and education ==
Lorenz was born on October 17, 1932, in Hackensack, New Jersey. After studying at North Junior High School in Newburgh, New York, where he starred in student productions, he continued with his education at Carnegie Tech and Pratt Institute.

== Career ==
His first published cartoon appeared in Colliers in 1956, and two years later he became a contract contributor to The New Yorker, which has published more than 1,600 of his drawings. He was The New Yorker's art editor for 25 years, from 1973 until 1993, continuing as cartoon editor until 1997.

Lorenz was a musician who played cornet with his own group, the Creole Cookin' Jazz Band.

Lorenz edited and wrote books on the art in The New Yorker, as well as the artists themselves, including The Art of The New Yorker (1995) and The World of William Steig (1998). He was the illustrator of Bruce Feirstein's popular satire Real Men Don't Eat Quiche (1982) and the followup by Joyce Jillson Real Women Don't Pump Gas. Lorenz is featured drawing in Lyda Ely's documentary film Funny Business (2009), which visited the studios of 11 cartoonists for The New Yorker.

== Personal life ==
Lorenz was first married to Joan Gaillardet. Together they had three children. Their marriage ended in divorce. He then married Jill Runcie; they had one child and later divorced. He then married and later divorced Jane Plant.

Lorenz died on December 8, 2022, at his home in Norwalk, Connecticut, at the age of 90.

== Awards ==
He received the National Cartoonists Society's Gag Cartoon Award for 1995 for his work.

== Bibliography ==
- Here It Comes (Bobbs-Merrill Co., Inc. 1968)
- Now Look What You've Done! (Pantheon, 1977)
- Hugo and the Spacedog (Prentice-Hall, 1983)
- The Golden Age of Trash (Chronicle Books, 1987)
- The Essential George Booth (Workman, 1998)
- The Essential Charles Barsotti (Workman, 1998)
- The Art of The New Yorker 1925 -1995, (Knopf, 1995)
- The World of William Steig (Artisan, 1998)
- The Essential Jack Ziegler (Workman, 2001)
- Big Gus and Little Gus (Prentice-Hall, 1982)
