= Elliot Cowan =

British actor (born 1976)

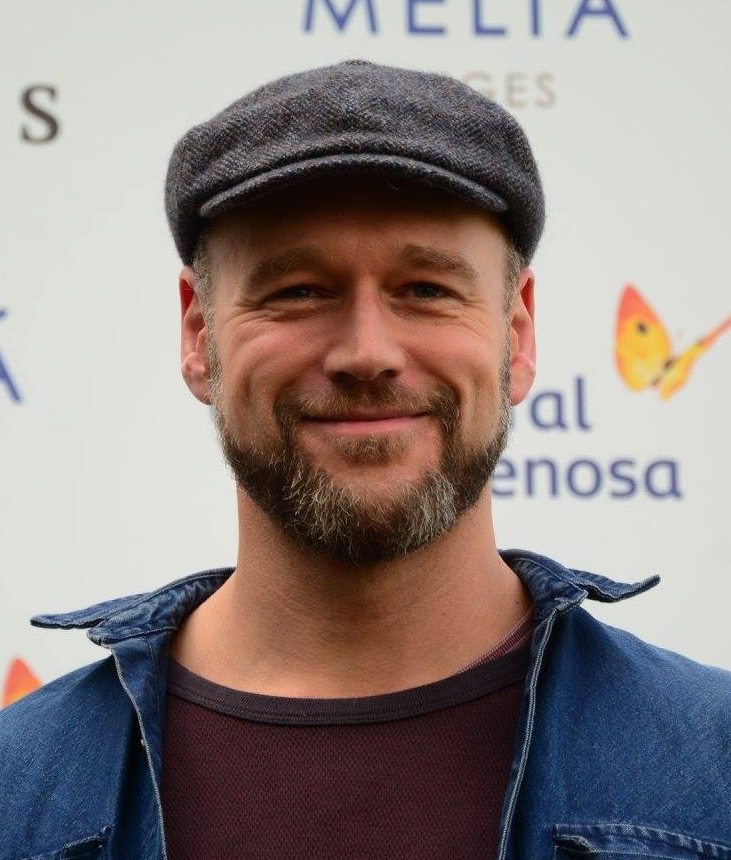
- Cowan in 2017
- Born: Elliot Aidan Cowan; 9 July 1976 (age 50); London, England
- Occupation: Actor
- Years active: 2000–present

Elliot Aidan Cowan (born 9 July 1976) is a British film and television actor, best known for portraying Corporal Jem Poynton in Ultimate Force, Mr Darcy in Lost in Austen, and Ptolemy in the 2004 film Alexander. He also starred as Lorenzo de' Medici in Da Vinci's Demons and Daron-Vex in Krypton. Cowan recently played King Henry VII in Starz's The Spanish Princess and featured in the Hulu miniseries Black Cake.

== Early life and education ==
Born in London, Cowan was brought up in Colchester, Essex. He is the son of a consultant physician and a charity worker, and has a younger brother and sister.

Cowan boarded at Uppingham School in Rutland. He later obtained a first class degree in drama at the University of Birmingham, before attending the Royal Academy of Dramatic Art in London, from which he graduated in July 2001. From 1994 to 1996, Cowan was a member of the National Youth Music Theatre. He plays guitar and cello, and has worked with the London Sinfonia.

== Career ==
Cowan's television credits include Judge John Deed, Ultimate Force, Jonathan Creek, Poirot, Foyle's War, The Ruby in the Smoke, Lost in Austen and the television movie The Project.

Cowan has appeared in the films The Golden Compass, Happy-Go-Lucky, The Christmas Miracle of Jonathan Toomey, Love and Other Disasters, and Howl. His theatre work includes productions of The Revenger's Tragedy, Women Beware Women, Henry V, The Seagull and Camille.

He played Stanley Kowalski in the 2009 revival of A Streetcar Named Desire at the Donmar Warehouse, and was a lead in Les Blancs at the National Theatre in 2016.

He played Macbeth at the Globe Theatre from 23 April- 27 June 2010 alongside Laura Rogers as Lady Macbeth.

He starred as Lord Goring in An Ideal Husband at the Vaudeville Theatre in London's West End from 4 November 2010 to 19 February 2011.

As of 2010, he voiced Alec Trevelyan in Goldeneye 007 for the Wii console, also providing his likeness.

== Personal life ==
He lives in Dalston, London. On 7 August 2011, Elliot swam the 16 miles (26 km) long Lake Zurich Swim race, to raise funds for the Neonatal Unit at Guy's and St. Thomas's in memory of Alfie Blacksell.

== Filmography ==
=== Film ===
Year	Film	Role	Notes
2004	Alexander	Ptolemy	
2006	Love and Other Disasters	James Wildstone	
2007	The Christmas Miracle of Jonathan Toomey	James McDowell	
2007	The Golden Compass	Commanding Officer	
2008	Happy-Go-Lucky	Bookshop Assistant	
2010	Max Schmeling	Alan Walken	
2011	Gee Gee	Gee Gee	Short film
2011	The Door	Edward Arlington	Short film
2012	Leyman's Curse	Hunter	Short film
2013	Hammer of the Gods	Hakan	
2014	The Protagonist	Alexander Croxford	Short film
2015	Howl	Adrian	
2015	Narcopolis	Frank Grieves	
2015	The Maltese Fighter	Opponent Boxer	Short film
2015	We Are Happy	Paul	Short film
2016	Angel of Decay	Bob	
2017	Butterfly Kisses	Billy	
2017	Muse	Samuel Solomon	
2017	Spitball	Timothy	Short film
2018	All the Devil's Men	Terry McKnight	
2018	Sydney	Stefan	Short film
2019	The Battle of San Pietro	John Huston	Short film
2025	The Conjuring: Last Rites	Jack Smurl	
2028	Tangled	King Frederic	Upcoming film

=== Television ===
Year	Show	Role	Notes
2001	Judge John Deed	Glen Burroughs	Episode: "Duty of Care"
2001	Jonathan Creek	Tom	Episode: "Satan's Chimney"
2002	The Project	Gavin	TV film
2002	Foyle's War	Peter Buckingham	Episode: "A Lesson in Murder"
2002	Real Crime	Bakery Worker	Episode: "Cracking the Killer's Code"
2002–2003	Ultimate Force	Corporal Jem Poynton	8 episodes
2003	Spine Chillers	Dean	Episode: "Goths"
2004	Dirty Filthy Love	Gareth	TV film
2005	Egypt	Champollion	2 episodes: "The Mystery of the Rosetta Stone" and "The Secrets of the Hieroglyphs"
2006	Agatha Christie's Poirot	David Hunter	Episode: "Taken at the Flood" miscredited as Elliot Lowan
2006	The Ruby in the Smoke	Hendrick Van Eeden	TV film
2007	The Mark of Cain	Captain Worriss	TV film
2008	Lost in Austen	Mr. Darcy	4 episodes
2008	In Love with Barbara	Alexander "Sacchie" McCorquodale	TV film
2009	The Fixer	Matthew Symmonds	6 episodes
2009	Agatha Christie's Marple	Wally Hudd	Episode: "They Do It with Mirrors"
2011	Marchlands	Mark Ashburn	5 episodes
2012	Sinbad	Gunnar	12 episodes
2012	Doors Open	Bruce Cameron	TV film
2013	Luther	Tom Marwood	2 episodes
2013	Ambassadors	Stephen Pembridge	Episode: "The Rabbit Never Escapes"
2013–2015	Da Vinci's Demons	Lorenzo de' Medici	25 episodes
2014	Cilla	George Martin	2 episodes
2015	The Frankenstein Chronicles	Sir Bentley Warburton	6 episodes
2015	Life in Squares	Roger Fry	2 episodes
2015	Serial Thriller	Bob	3 episodes
2015	Critical	Tom Farrow	Episode #1.5
2016	Beowulf: Return to the Shieldlands	Abrican	13 episodes
2018	Innocent	Tom Wilson	4 episodes
2018–2019	Krypton	Daron-Vex	10 episodes
2019	The Spanish Princess	Henry VII, King of England	8 episodes
2019	Peaky Blinders	Michael Levitt	Episode: "Black Tuesday"
2020	Death in Paradise	Aaron McCormack	Episode: "La Murder Le Diablé"
2021	Foundation	Director Lewis Pirenne	8 episodes
2022	The Crown	Norton Knatchbull	2 episodes
2023	Black Cake	Steve	4 episodes
2023	Fifteen-Love	Adam Jaffe	4 episodes
2024	The Jetty	Russell Knightly	2 episodes
2025	King & Conqueror	Sweyn	
2026	Gone	Stephen Sedgwick	

=== Videogames ===
Year	Game	Role	Notes
2009	Dragon Age: Origins	Ser Perth	
2009	Dragon Age: Origins	Ser Varal	
2009	Dragon Age: Origins	Lothering Templar	
2010	GoldenEye 007	Alec Trevelyan	Voice role
2011	Star Wars: The Old Republic	Additional voices	
2017	Warhammer 40,000: Dawn of War III	Autarch Kyre / Orks (voice)	
2020	Assassin's Creed Valhalla	Vili	Voice role
2021	Necromunda: Hired Gun	Various voices	
2021	Bravely Default II	Bernard	

=== Theatre ===
Year	Show	Role	Theatre	Other notes
2008	Frost/Nixon	Jim Reston	Donmar Warehouse	
2009	A Streetcar Named Desire	Stanley Kowalski	Donmar Warehouse	
2019	A Doll's House	Tom	Lyric Hammersmith	
2021	2:22 A Ghost Story	Sam	Gielgud Theatre	
2023	A Little Life	Brother Luke / Dr. Traylor / Caleb	Harold Pinter Theatre	
