= Natalya Simonova =

Fictional character in the film GoldenEye

- James Bond character
- Izabella Scorupco as Natalya Simonova
- Portrayed by: Izabella Scorupco (film); Kirsty Mitchell (2010 video game)

In-universe information
- Gender: Female
- Affiliation: Russian Space Forces
- Classification: Bond girl

Natalya Fyodorovna Simonova (Russian: Наталья Фёдоровна Семёнова) is a fictional character and the main Bond girl in the James Bond film GoldenEye, played by actress Izabella Scorupco.

== Biography ==
Natalya Simonova works as a programmer at the Severnaya facility of the Russian Space Forces, on work involving missile guidance systems. When the treasonous General Arkady Ouromov and Xenia Onatopp attack the station, with a stolen Tiger helicopter, she is left the only survivor, besides Boris Grishenko, who had allied himself with Ourumov and Alec Trevelyan, the plan's mastermind.

Simonova attempts to find Boris, who she believes to be innocent, he meets her in a cathedral and turns her over to Onatopp. Simonova and James Bond, who have both been captured, by Trevelyan, are trapped in the stolen Tiger helicopter. The helicopter is programmed to fire missiles at itself, but Bond is able to eject the two, who are subsequently arrested by the Russian government. Ourumov sets Bond free to clear his own name of murder, Bond escapes, but loses Natalya, in the process. He then rescues her from Ourumov and Trevelyan, and they become lovers. The two then follow Trevelyan to Cuba.

Finally, the two assault Trevelyan's satellite base, where Natalya is able to prevent the rogue satellite Mischa from sending an electromagnetic pulse to destroy London. Natalya breaks into the computer room and resets the satellite's course to cause a burn up over the Atlantic Ocean. She destroys the GoldenEye satellite and commandeers a helicopter to pick up Bond and herself, by using the gun Bond gave her. Natalya saves Bond right after he defeats Trevelyan. She and Bond leave in the helicopter and get dropped off a distance away, where Jack Wade is waiting for them.

In an early draft of the script for the next film in the series, Tomorrow Never Dies, Bond mentions to Wade that Natalya married a hockey player, a reference to Izabella Scorupco's real-life marriage to Polish hockey player Mariusz Czerkawski.

== Featured in ==
- GoldenEye (1995)
- GoldenEye 007 (1997) — video game
- GoldenEye 007 (2010) — video game (portrayed, by Kirsty Mitchell)

== Reception ==
Author Helena Bassil-Morosow states that "like her predecessors, Tatyana Romanova and Anya Amasova, Natalya is strong, beautiful and resilient but still needs Bond to save her."

IGN ranked Natalya as the 7th best Bond girl, saying "she was exactly what the franchise needed to get back on top after a lengthy time away from the big screen".

In 2008, Cracked.com rated the version of Natalya in the 1997 video game as 10th on their list of The 15 Most Annoying Video Game Characters (From Otherwise Great Games). The review noted the artificial intelligence given to the character lacked any "instinct for self-preservation", and would often die for reasons such as running in front of the playing character while they were shooting.
