= Stephanie Skalisky =

American artist

- Born: 1960 (age 65–66); Sacramento, California, United States of America
- Education: California State University, Sacramento
- Known for: Cartoonist for The New Yorker during 1989-1993

Stephanie Skalisky (pronounced skaa lih skee; born 1960) is an American artist who is best known for her series of works she made while working for The New Yorker as a cartoonist.

== Early life and education ==
Stephanie Skalisky was born in Sacramento, California. She is part Polish, part Czech on her father's side, part Italian on her mother's side and, in her own words, "part of an old Sacramento family that breeds like rabbits." She started pursuing her art at a young age by painting on the glass windows of her childhood home. Her mother and teachers at Shingle Springs Elementary School noticed her aptitude for art early on and encouraged her to pursue her talent. Her early art teachers believed in her so much she was encouraged to paint in a room separate from the other students. After changing schools when she was sixteen, Skalisky would work on art rather than sit in the cafeteria alone. Skalisky was encouraged to find her own unique style by her art teachers at the high schools she attended. Later Stephanie Skalisky went to receive her BA and an MFA in art at California State University, Sacramento. During her schooling, Skalisky spent nine months in Italy, studying art.

== Career ==
Skalisky made her start as a cartoonist when she was recognized for her "unusual vision" by Lee Lorenz, The New Yorker's art editor at the time. Skalisky was exhibiting self-portrait of herself as George Washington during a trip to San Francisco when she was found by Lorenz. Lorenz urged her to submit drawings to The New Yorker after seeing one of her exhibits in California. Before being encouraged by Lorenz, Skalisky says she never thought of cartoons as art and never imagined doing cartoons as a job. Skalisky was active with The New Yorker from October 2, 1989 – February 22, 1993 and sold more than 30 cartoons to them within that time. Skalisky is also credited for using her watercolors to paint some covers for The New Yorker. One of which is The New Yorker's 1991 holiday special that depicts a Santa Claus playing a slot machine. Other Specific ones are unknown and unaccredited to her. She also has sold 8 cartoons to PULSE! magazine, a music critic-focused magazine based out of Sacramento, California. Skalisky's authentic cartoons are known to sell for $500 and up while her watercolor covers for $3,000. Despite living out of the public eye, since 1991, Skalisky has been teaching art to adults with disabilities at Short Center North in Sacramento. As of 2014, she is still mentoring students and exhibiting art with them. As of 2018, she still presents at several galleries in Sacrament, California, including Gallery 2110.

== Style and themes ==
Skalisky has defined her own art style as an "odd mix of neurotic, sarcastic off-colored humor that even when I was a kid was funny to me and very accessible". Skalisky owes a lot of her humor to the women in her family before her and says "[My humor] is a survival mechanism that genetically got passed on to me". During her time at California State University, Skalisky was inspired greatly by art historian John Fitz Gibbon. This professor influenced Skalisky's love for Italian primitives and painters of the trecento. According to Donnelly's "Funny Ladies: The New Yorker's Greatest Women Cartoonists and Their Cartoons", Skalisky's art style has been described as similar to Roz Chast's, another female comics creator for The New Yorker, work. Skalisky's work has also been described as "Chast on drugs". According to Renee Crist's "Skalisky Leaping", Skalisky draws from the pop culture of the 1990s. It has been described as a "startling blend of trash culture stuff and classicism." Skalisky juxtaposes various components in her compositions to draw interest and uncomfortability from her viewers. Although Skalisky is more well known for her cartoons with The New Yorker, she also exhibited what she calls her fine arts, a distinction from her cartoons she is adamant to make. Glass painting, carving, watercolor painting and drawing are the art mediums that Skalisky defines as her "fine arts". Some of Skalisky's favorite work is polychromes on wood paneling carvings that have been known to sell for $3,500.

== Awards and exhibitions ==
=== Grants and awards ===
One of Skalisky's earliest awards was third place at the California State Exposition Competition in 1983 in the Mixed Media category. Skalisky has received two grants from the Sacramento Metropolitan Arts Commission. The first grant was for a project using layered glass shadow boxes in 1988, and the second was for a limited edition alphabet book that Skalisky made using watercolors titled The Alphabet for Extraordinary Children and Eccentric Adults which was exhibited in 1989. Both of these works were presented in The Himovitz Gallery, a subdivision of The Sacramento Metropolitan Arts Commission. In 1991, she took first place in the Visual Arts category for the Dewar's Young Artist Recognition Award for her work in wood carving. In 1997, Skalisky was the recipient of a "New Works" grant awarded by the Sacramento Metropolitan Arts Commission.

=== Exhibitions ===
Skalisky has shown at the Recent Acquisitions of the Achenbach Foundation show, which was held at the California Legion of Honor in San Francisco in 1987. Skalisky has also had one work that was in a show at the Fine Arts Museum of San Francisco in 1987 called Self Portrait of my Father. The Himovitz in Sacramento, California has had many shows that include both Skalisky's fine arts as well as her cartoons and sketches. As of 1990, she has had group and one-person shows at the Craft and Folk Art Museum in Los Angeles, the Parsons School of Design in New York, the Hatley-Martin Gallery in San Francisco and the Himovitz Gallery in Sacramento. Her work is included in several museums, most notably the Achenbach Foundation collection at the California Palace of the Legion of Honor in San Francisco. In 1991, The Himovitz housed the exhibit titled "Recent drawings and wood panel work, drawings from The New Yorker,". Skalisky worked with an after-school program, along with Steve Vanoni, in which the students painted various furniture to present to the audience in the exhibit titled "Funartchair," as a fundraiser for the Grant High School art workshops. In 2000, Some of Skalisky's work was exhibited in a dinner venue/ art bar, named Pegase Restaurant, as the talking piece of a table made out of a shadow box. Although the work is not identified as to which one is on this abnormal display, it was rumored to be sold for $1,200, not including the shadow box. In 2004, Skalisky showed work titled Some People Just Disappear at the Solomon Dubnick Gallery. Skalisky showed art in a 2006 exhibit titled "Everything Nice", which was a feminist art work by only woman artists at the Toyroom Gallery. Skalisky was said to be a part of an exhibit at the Pence Art Gallery named Shimmer in 2010. In 2014, Stephanie was also part of a group exhibit titled The Point of No Return at FE Gallery. In 2015 she presented in a group show with her artwork, "ice fishing" at Gallery 2110. In 2014, Skalisky helped curate an exhibit titled "Many Happy Returns: Celebrating 35 Years of Short Center North", where over 120 of Short Center North's student's work was presented.
