= French frigate La Fayette =

French battleship

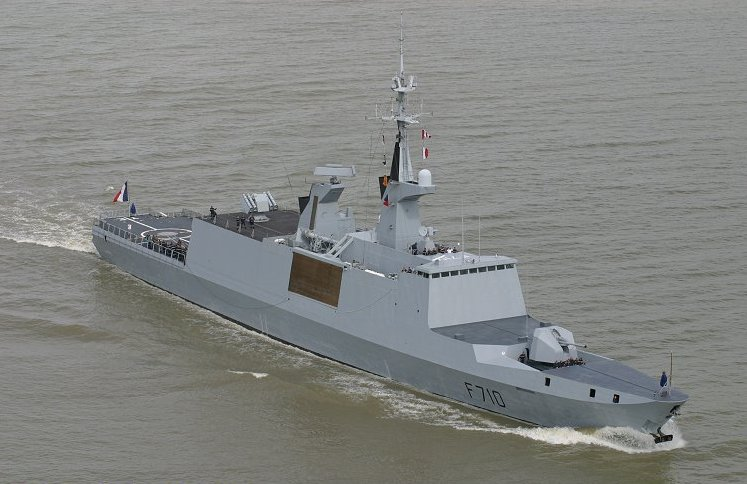

History

France
- Name: La Fayette
- Namesake: Marquis de Lafayette
- Laid down: 15 December 1990
- Launched: 13 June 1992
- Commissioned: 22 March 1996
- Home port: Toulon
- Status: in active service

General characteristics
- Class & type: La Fayette-class frigate
- Displacement: 3,280 t (3,230 long tons); 3,680 t (3,620 long tons) fully loaded
- Length: 125 m (410 ft 1 in)
- Beam: 15.4 m (50 ft 6 in)
- Draught: 4.8 m (15 ft 9 in)
- Propulsion: 4 × SEMT Pielstick 12PA6V280 STC2 diesel engines, 21,000 hp (16,000 kW)
- Speed: 25 knots (46 km/h; 29 mph)
- Range: 7,000 nmi (13,000 km; 8,100 mi) at 15 knots (28 km/h; 17 mph)
- Complement: 170+;197 reported embarked for 2023 global deployment
- Sensors & processing systems: 1 × Air/Surface DRBV 15C sentry radar; 1 x SENIT FLF combat management system (replaced previous Thales TAVITAC CMS during 2021–22 refit); 1 × firing control radar for the 100 mm gun; 1 × DRBN34 navigation radar; 1 × DRBN34 landing radar; 1 x KingKlip Mk 2 hull-mounted sonar (fitted during 2021-22 refit)
- Electronic warfare & decoys: 1 × Saïgon ARBG 1 radio interceptor; 1 × ARBR 21 radar interceptor; 2 × Dagaie Mk2 chaff launcher; 1 × AN/SLQ-25 Nixie tugged noise maker; 1 × Prairie-Masker noise reduction system; 1 × Syracuse II; 1 × Inmarsat; CANTO anti-torpedo countermeasures (fitted during 2021-22 refit)
- Armament: Anti-ship; 8 × Exocet MM40 Block 3 anti-ship missiles (Block 3c variant entering service in French Navy from December 2022); Guns; 1 × 100 mm TR automatic gun; 2 × 20 mm modèle F2 guns; Anti-aircraft; 2 x 6 Sadral launchers with Mistral Mk 3 SAM/SSM (replaced previous Crotale SAM during 2021–22 refit)
- Armour: On sensitive areas (munition magazine and control centre)
- Aircraft carried: 1 × helicopter (Panther or NH90)

La Fayette is a general purpose stealth frigate of the French Navy (Marine Nationale). She is the second French vessel named after the 18th century general Marquis de Lafayette. She is the lead ship of the class.

== Upgrade ==
La Fayette began a major life extension upgrade in October 2021. The upgrade is designed to permit the frigate to operate through the 2020s and into the 2030s and incorporates the addition of hull-mounted sonar, improved point air defence systems, the CANTO anti-torpedo countermeasures system, as well as the capacity to deploy the latest variant of the Exocet anti-ship missile. The frigate returned to sea for testing of her new systems in May 2022 and was declared fully operational again in November 2022. She is to remain active until 2031.

== Career post-upgrade ==
In February 2023, the frigate was tasked to initiate an around the world deployment accompanying the helicopter assault ship Dixmude. The deployment was to involve a series of exercises and port calls enroute. According to the commander of the mission, Captain Emmanuel Mocard, La Fayette possesses improved sea-keeping and endurance following her upgrade and the scope of the planned deployment would not have been feasible prior to her refit. The frigate returned to Toulon in July.

In 2024, La Fayette deployed to the Atlantic to fill a gap resulting from the retirement of the patrol vessel Premier-Maître L'Her and a delay in the commissioning of the new frigate Amiral Ronarc'h.

== Gallery ==
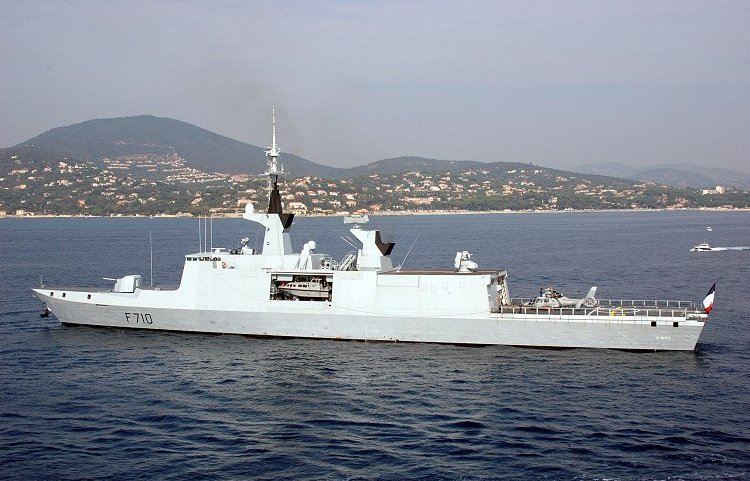

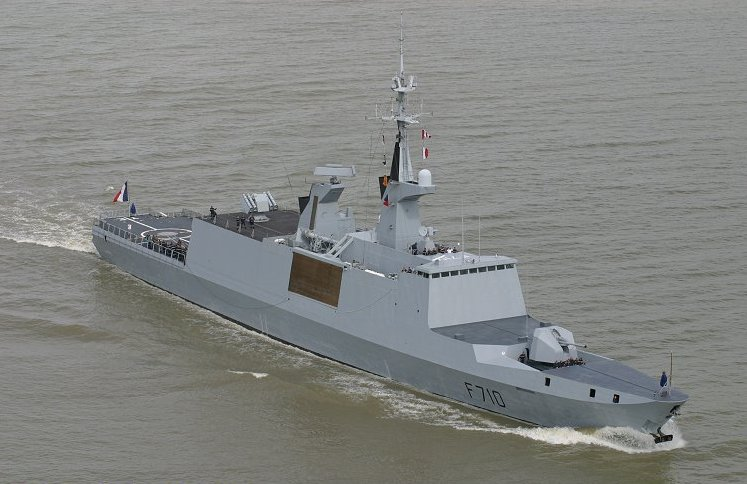

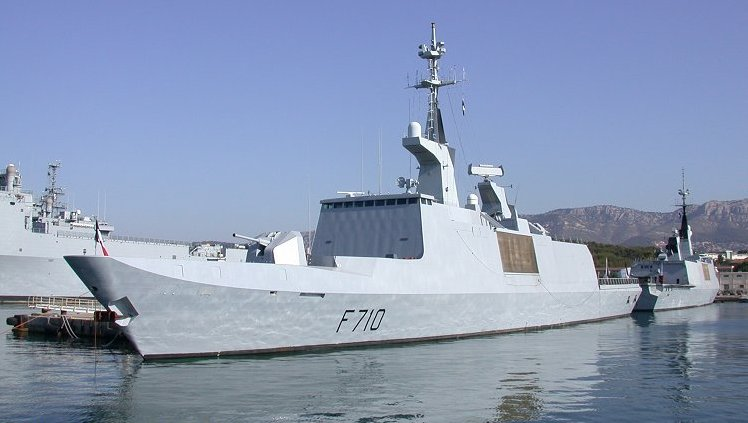

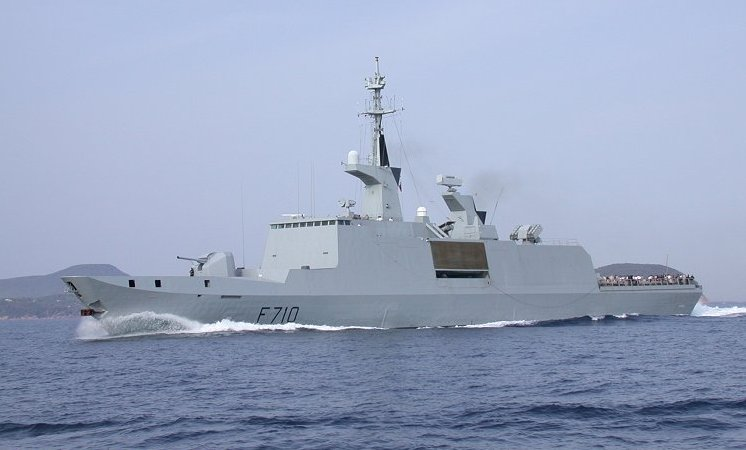

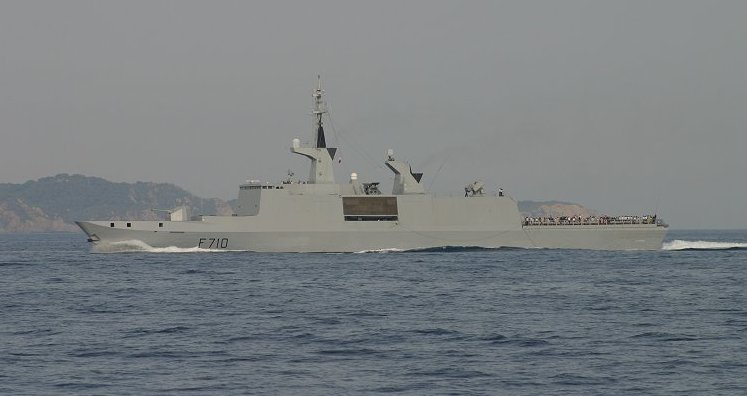

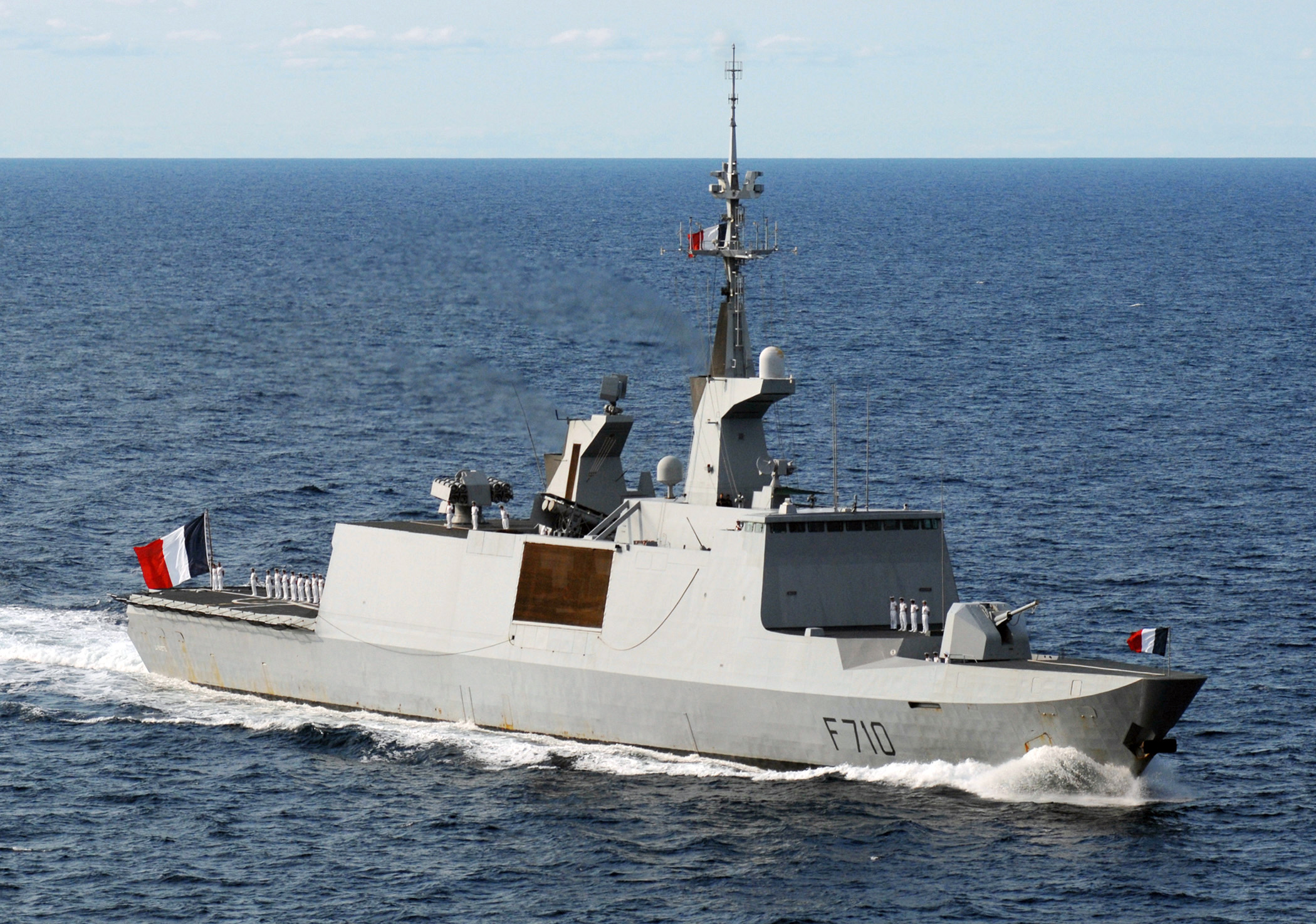

== In popular culture ==
- La Fayette was featured in the 1995 James Bond film GoldenEye, as the site for the unveiling of the Eurocopter Tiger, which is subsequently stolen in the film. The 1997 video game based on the movie, GoldenEye 007, released for the Nintendo 64, includes a hostage rescue mission on board La Fayette. This mission was reimagined for the game's 2010 remake, developed for the Wii and Nintendo DS consoles, as well as its own 2011 remaster, GoldenEye 007: Reloaded, available for the PlayStation 3 and Xbox 360 platforms.
