= Alec Trevelyan =

Fictional James Bond character

Alec Trevelyan / Janus
- James Bond character
- Sean Bean portraying Alec Trevelyan
- First appearance: GoldenEye (1995)
- Portrayed by: Sean Bean
- Voiced by: Elliot Cowan (2010 video game)

In-universe information
- Aliases: 006; Janus
- Gender: Male
- Occupation: Head of Janus Syndicate (former MI6 operative)
- Affiliation: Janus Syndicate
- Classification: Villain
- Henchmen: Xenia Onatopp; General Ourumov; Boris Grishenko

Alec Trevelyan, also known as 006, is a fictional character and the main antagonist in the James Bond film GoldenEye (1995) portrayed by the English actor Sean Bean. Bean's likeness was also used as the model for Alec Trevelyan in the video game GoldenEye 007 (1997).

== GoldenEye ==
=== Character information ===
The character Alec Trevelyan (Sean Bean) is born to Lienz Cossacks who collaborated with the Nazis, but attempted to defect to the United Kingdom at the end of World War II. When the UK instead sent them back to the Soviets, many are executed by Joseph Stalin's death squads. Though Trevelyan's parents survive, his father, ashamed to have lived, kills his wife and himself. At the time, Trevelyan is only six years old. He is then transported to the United Kingdom and taken in by MI6, which continue to sponsor his training and education throughout his childhood (by Trevelyan's own account, MI6 thinks he would have been "too young to remember"). At 18, he begins to formally work for MI6 under the alias Agent 006, and subsequently begins planning his revenge against the British government for his family's demise. He considers recruiting fellow MI6 agent and friend James Bond (Pierce Brosnan) to his cause, but ultimately decides against it, believing Bond too loyal to MI6.

On a mission working alongside Bond to blow up the Arkhangelsk chemical weapons facility in the Soviet Union, Trevelyan betrays MI6. During the operation, Trevelyan fakes his own execution with the help of the base's commander, Colonel Arkady Grigorovich Ourumov (Gottfried John). Bond manages to finish the mission and escapes unscathed by changing the sequence of detonation timers. This action unwittingly leads to Trevelyan being disfigured in the subsequent explosion. Later Bond admits to M (Judi Dench) that he feels responsible for Trevelyan's apparent death.

Nine years later, Bond's pursuit of a stolen helicopter and investigation of an explosion leads him to Saint Petersburg, where he learns from gangster Valentin Zukovsky (Robbie Coltrane) that the head of the crime syndicate responsible for the theft is a man operating under the name Janus. Later, when he finally meets Janus, Bond is shocked to discover the scarred Trevelyan.

=== Scheme ===
Trevelyan's scheme begins with the theft of the experimental, electromagnetically insulated Tiger helicopter from the French frigate La Fayette, using his two primary operatives, Ourumov, now a General in the Russian army and head of their Space Division, and Xenia Onatopp (Famke Janssen). With the helicopter, the two fly to the GoldenEye satellite facility in Severnaya, Siberia, where they murder the staff, steal the access keys for the GoldenEye weapons satellite, and program the satellite to destroy the facility to cover up the theft. The GoldenEye weapons satellite is actually two smaller disposable satellites named Petya and Mischa, which are armed with nuclear warheads that when detonated in the atmosphere create electromagnetic pulses capable of destroying any machinery with an electronic signal.

== GoldenEye 007 (video game) ==
- The original GoldenEye 007 had no voiceovers, and thus no voice actor played Alec Trevelyan. He is based almost completely on his GoldenEye persona, including appearance and back-story.
- The 2010 enhanced remake of the original updates the story, setting it to 2010. With his original motivation of revenge for his parents' betrayal no longer practical given his age, Trevelyan's motives for betraying the United Kingdom are now his disgust at the current economic system; it is implied that he was actively involved in operations as Janus while still working with MI6 rather than starting Janus after his 'death'. His essential plan remains the same, however. His appearance has changed as well. His background includes having served in the Parachute Regiment prior to joining MI6. He is voiced by Elliot Cowan and also uses Cowan's likeness.

== Reception ==
Trevelyan was the only 00 Agent (other than Bond himself) to have a substantial role in a Bond film, including sizeable screen and speaking time, until the debut of Lashana Lynch's Nomi in 2021's No Time to Die. Previously, the only other '00' agent to have had any amount of screen time or to play a role in a Bond film was Octopussy's 009, portrayed by stuntman Andy Bradford.

Apart from seeing the back of their heads or shortly before they are killed and/or dead already (Thunderball, A View to a Kill, and The Living Daylights), other 00 agents are rarely seen and only spoken of (an example being Agent 002 Bill Fairbanks in The Man with the Golden Gun, who is only mentioned). When Bean auditioned for the film, he was considered for the role of Bond (see List of actors considered for the James Bond character).

Trevelyan has been consistently ranked among the greatest Bond villains, and is considered the dark inversion of Bond.
