= Mr. President (TV series) =

- Carlin Glynn and George C. Scott
- Genre: Sitcom
- Created by: Ed. Weinberger; Johnny Carson
- Written by: David Lloyd; Johnny Carson; Gene Reynolds; Ed. Weinberger
- Directed by: Marc Daniels
- Starring: George C. Scott
- Theme music composer: Patrick Williams
- Composer: Bill Maxwell
- Country of origin: United States
- Original language: English
- No. of seasons: 2
- No. of episodes: 24

Production
- Executive producer: Gene Reynolds
- Running time: 30 min.
- Production company: Carson Productions

Original release
- Network: Fox
- Release: May 3, 1987 – February 13, 1988

Mr. President is an American sitcom created by Johnny Carson's company, Carson Productions, that starred George C. Scott and premiered on May 3, 1987. It was part of the Fox Broadcasting Company's premiere season of prime time entertainment, alongside Married... with Children, The Tracey Ullman Show, and Duet.

== Plot ==
The series centered around newly elected President Samuel Arthur Tresch, the former governor of Wisconsin. Others in the cast were Meg Tresch, Samuel's wife, who left him at the start of the second season, and Samuel's children, 16-year-old Cynthia and 12-year-old Nick. Charlie Ross was the Chief of Staff.

The show takes place in the near future relative to its airing: it is mentioned in the episode “Freedom of Speech” that Tresch won the 1988 United States presidential election and a newspaper headline in “Strange Bedfellows” indicates that the events of that episode take place around October 8, 1990. It is implied in “Loisgate” that Meg and Samuel separated in April 1991.

== Cast ==
- George C. Scott as President Samuel Arthur Tresch
- Conrad Bain as Charlie Ross, the President's Chief of Staff
- Carlin Glynn as First Lady Meg Tresch; she leaves the President at the beginning of the second season
- Maddie Corman as Cynthia Tresch, the President's youngest daughter
- Susan Wheeler Duff as Jennifer, the President's eldest daughter (married)
- Andre Gower as Nick Tresch, the President's son
- Madeline Kahn as Lois Gullickson, the President's sister-in-law; after the President's wife leaves him, she moves into the White House to help care for the children
- Earl Boen as Dave
- Allen Williams as Daniel Cummings

== Production ==
In the summer of 1986, Johnny Carson went to the residence of George C. Scott to propose starring in a half-hour sitcom involving the day-to-day life of a man who "just happened to be the President of the United States", complete with 13 episodes as a premiere show for the upstart Fox Broadcasting Company, which had started in April. Scott found it an alluring challenge and chance to make a show better than the status quo type of programming. The result was a show that saw Scott butt heads with the attempts to emphasize gags and topical humor to go with shtick despite taking the time out of his Connecticut home to go to the West Coast (complete with a request for a motor home near the shooting stage) to volunteer services for story conferences. Scott came up with an idea for an episode where his character must appoint a Vice President and he picks a highly qualified black woman that sees repercussions ensue. However, the concept was rejected despite Scott paying a writer for a first draft, with Scott quoting the executive producer as saying, "I don't know how to do a story like that." In the buildup to the premiere, Carson described it as “not a situation comedy...I would call it more of a drama – with humor and with comedy and all the other emotions people have within a family", while Scott cited the talent alongside the chance to ensure his retirement with money.

The show was cancelled in the winter of 1987. Scott, describing the working situation as "positively Byzantine", wrote an article to the Los Angeles Times relating his experience with the show within a sardonic conversation between himself and his conscience (named Sam Tresch) after he had dealt with an acute myocardial infarction in January 1988; he stated that the show had managed to succeed only in "trivializing the presidency."

== Episodes ==
=== Season 1 (1987) ===
No. overall	No. in season	Title	Directed by	Written by	Original release date
1	1	"Pilot"	Gene Reynolds	Ed. Weinberger	May 3, 1987
2	2	"The Magnetic Presidency"	Unknown	Unknown	May 10, 1987
3	3	"Cabin Fever"	Bruce Brinckerhoff	E. Jack Kaplan	May 17, 1987
4	4	"Freedom of Speech"	Unknown	Unknown	May 31, 1987
5	5	"Meet the People"	Unknown	Unknown	June 7, 1987
6	6	"Private Moments"	Unknown	Unknown	June 21, 1987
7	7	"The First Son-in-Law"	Bruce Brinckerhoff	David Lloyd	June 28, 1987
8	8	"Uncle Sam"	Burt Brinckerhoff	Bruce Feirstein	July 12, 1987
9	9	"Strange Bedfellows"	Bruce Brinckerhoff	John Sweet	July 19, 1987
10	10	"Love's Labor Last"	Unknown	Unknown	July 26, 1987

=== Season 2 (1987–88) ===
No. overall	No. in season	Title	Directed by	Written by	Original release date
11	1	"Dear Sam: Part 1"	Greg Antonacci	Peter Noah	September 27, 1987
12	2	"Dear Sam: Part 2"	Greg Antonacci	Peter Noah	October 4, 1987
13	3	"Armageddon Kinda Sore"	Marc Daniels	David Cohen & Roger S.H. Schulman	October 11, 1987
14	4	"He'll Have to Go"	Marc Daniels	Sybil Adelman & Martin Sage	October 18, 1987
15	5	"The Language Barrier"	Marc Daniels	David Lloyd	October 24, 1987
16	6	"Loisgate"	Unknown	Unknown	October 31, 1987
17	7	"Yes, Mr. President"	Marc Daniels	Christian Williams	November 7, 1987
18	8	"Lois Gets Lucky"	Unknown	Sybil Adelman & Martin Sage	November 14, 1987
19	9	"The President's Brother"	Marc Daniels	Unknown	November 21, 1987
20	10	"The Christmas Story"	Unknown	Unknown	December 26, 1987
21	11	"Insecurity"	Marc Daniels	Craig Heller	January 2, 1988
22	12	"A Royal Send Off"	Marc Daniels	Sybil Adelman & Martin Sage	January 16, 1988
23	13	"All About Jean"	Marc Daniels	Unknown	February 6, 1988
24	14	"Get a Job"	Stephen Zuckerman	John Swartzwelder	February 13, 1988
