= Wayne Michaels =

English stuntman and stunt arranger (born 1959)

Wayne David Michaels (born 22 January 1959 in Blackpool) is an English stuntman and stunt arranger.

== Biography ==
Michaels attended Millfield School from 1972 to 1977. He is married to Tracey Eddon since 1990 and have one child. He performed the bungee jump in the opening scenes in the James Bond film GoldenEye. The opening 220 m bungee jump, shot at the Verzasca Dam in Switzerland, was voted the best movie stunt of all time as of 2002 and set a record for the highest bungee jump off a fixed structure.

Apart from his work on a number of James Bond films, he has performed stunts on more than 60 British and international film and television projects during the 1980s, the 1990s, and the 2000s.

== Select filmography ==
Year	Title	Role	Notes
1987	Lucifer	Police sergeant	
1989	Indiana Jones and the Last Crusade	German Agent	Uncredited
1989	Batman	Napier Hood #3	
1992	Blue Ice	Terrorist	Uncredited
1995	GoldenEye	Capt. Bernard Jaubert - Tiger Helicopter Pilot	Uncredited
