= Xenia Onatopp =

Character in James Bond film Golden Eye

- James Bond character
- Famke Janssen as Xenia Onatopp
- First appearance: GoldenEye (1995)
- Portrayed by: Famke Janssen (1995)
- Voiced by: Jenya Lano (GoldenEye: Rogue Agent); Kate Magowan (GoldenEye 007)

In-universe information
- Gender: Female
- Affiliation: ex-Soviet Air Force; Janus
- Classification: Bond girl Henchwoman

Xenia Zaragevna Onatopp (Russian: Ксения Сергеевна Онатопп, romanized: Kseniya Sergeevna Onatopp) is a fictional character and Bond girl in the James Bond film GoldenEye, played by actress Famke Janssen. She is a fighter pilot and assassin, who crushes her enemies with her thighs to get sexual satisfaction, working for the renegade MI6 agent Alec Trevelyan.

Onatopp has appeared in a number of James Bond video games as a playable multiplayer character.

== In the film ==
Xenia Onatopp, born in the Georgian Soviet Socialist Republic, is a former officer and fighter pilot in the Soviet Air Force. She enjoys playing baccarat and smoking cigars.

After the collapse of the Soviet Union, she joins the crime syndicate Janus, led by traitorous MI6 agent Alec Trevelyan. James Bond first encounters Onatopp when he gets into a car chase with her. He then meets her at a casino and places her under surveillance.

Onatopp lures a Canadian admiral, Chuck Farrell, onto a yacht moored off Monte Carlo and kills him during a sexual honey trap, by crushing his ribs with her thighs, achieving orgasm in the process. Meanwhile, Trevelyan's henchman General Arkady Grigorovich Ourumov steals the dead admiral's NATO ID and uniform, granting him and Onatopp access to a prototype EMP-hardened Eurocopter Tiger aboard a French warship anchored off Monte Carlo.

Onatopp then hijacks the helicopter by killing the two pilots, Captain Bernard Jaubert and Lieutenant François Brouse. Later, she and Ourumov use the hijacked Tiger in an attack on the Severnaya satellite control center in central Siberia, where they steal the controller for the GoldenEye satellite weapon. During the attack, she kills all the military personnel and civilian technicians present, and is visibly aroused by the killing. She then appears as Bond's link to the Janus group. In a meeting arranged, by Bond's dealings, with Valentin Zukovsky, a Russian arms dealer and former KGB agent, Onatopp arrives to meet Bond as he swims in a Turkish Bath. The two indulge in aggressive foreplay where Onatopp attempts to crush Bond between her thighs, after which he finally draws his Walther PPK on her and demands to be taken to Janus.

In Onatopp's final encounter with Bond in Cuba, she ambushes him and Severnaya programmer Natalya Simonova by rappeling from a helicopter, and again attempts to crush him between her legs. Bond uses her assault rifle to damage the helicopter, entangling her rope, which pulls her off him, crushing her to death against a tree trunk.

Regarding Onatopp for a moment, Bond quips, "she always did enjoy a good squeeze".

== In video games ==
Onatopp's first appearance in a video game was in the 1997 video game adaptation of GoldenEye, GoldenEye 007 for the Nintendo 64. She is with Trevelyan on the train stage of the game. If the player quickly shoots her after eliminating Ourumov, she will yell to Trevelyan that she is wounded and to wait up for her; this buys the player more time to escape from the train. She later reappears in the jungle stage. Similar to the film, she is killed in the jungles of Cuba in a firefight with Bond. Killing Onatopp is the only way for the player to dual-wield two different guns in the game without a complex series of button presses; she uses an RC-P90 and a grenade launcher at the same time.

In the James Bond game Nightfire, Onatopp also appears as a multiplayer character. She can be unlocked by a cheat on the cheats menu as Janus, the organization she works for in the movie.

Onatopp appeared in the spinoff Bond game GoldenEye: Rogue Agent where she works for Dr. Julius No and is Agent GoldenEye's alluring opponent. She is commander of No's army, which has taken over the Hoover Dam. She is killed after being thrown off of the Hoover Dam while fighting GoldenEye. In the game, her likeness was based on Famke Janssen, but she was voiced by actress Jenya Lano.

Onatopp appears in the GoldenEye remake as a former Russian general, who had served under Ouromov during the Russian invasion of Georgia. Her plot arc is significantly changed for the remake. She appears in the Nightclub level disguised as a waitress where James Bond first meets her. She assassinates Valentin Zukovsky after he gives vital information about Janus to Bond. Bond is then framed for the murder of Zukovsky. She betrays and assassinates Ouromov in the train level in which she appears. During her final confrontation, with Bond, she is lowered down to him from a helicopter and proceeds to engage in hand-to-hand combat with him. She is defeated when Bond launches a missile at her helicopter while she is strangling him, the helicopter crashing into a nearby gorge and dragging her down with it. She is voiced by and modeled after Kate Magowan.

== Analysis ==
Anna Katherine Amacker and Donna Ashley Moore suggest that Onatopp is a "direct throwback to the earlier style of Bond girl, complete with an innuendo-laden name and a blatant sexuality". Robert A. Saunders suggests that she "personifies the hypersexualized archetype of the post-Soviet Russian woman".

Helena Bassil-Morosow suggests that Onatopp is "visually coded as a stereotypical dominatrix: dark hair, bright red lipstick, smoky eyeshadow and sharply defined eyebrows", while Monica Germanà suggests that "Xenia's glamour encapsulates the sadistic quality of her excessive appetite".

Bassil-Morosow goes on to note that Onatopp "also sees violence as a broadly defined sexual act in which she gets to dominate and ultimately decide people's fates", and argues that she "poses a threat to Bond's status as a dominant male as she consistently outdoes him in all his favourite activities: driving, killing, risk-taking and having sex with multiple partners". In this way, she "has to be eventually killed by him because not only is she ruthless and unstoppable but also metaphorically as a punishment for refusing to admire him". Bassil-Morosow concludes that "Onatopp's character, masculinised, independent, domineering and sexually liberated, can be read as a bitter parody of feminism."

== Reception ==
Xenia Onatopp has appeared in several lists of the top 10 Bond girls, including by Entertainment Weekly. Yahoo! Movies had her name included in the list of the best Bond girl names, even while calling it a "slightly-too-obvious pun". In 2015, The Telegraph suggested that "in the stolid Brosnan years, former Soviet fighter pilot Onatopp was a breath of fresh air". Paul Simpson argues that with Onatopp, the femme fatale made a "welcome reappearance" after the role had previously fallen out of fashion.
