= The Best Legs in the Eighth Grade =

- Genre: Comedy
- Written by: Bruce Feirstein
- Starring: Tim Matheson; Annette O'Toole; Kathryn Harrold; James Belushi
- Theme music composer: Lee Holdridge
- Country of origin: United States
- Original language: English

Production
- Executive producer: Michael Lepiner
- Producer: Kenneth Kaufman
- Editor: Ken Denisoff
- Running time: 48 min.
- Production company: Telecom Entertainment Inc.

Original release
- Network: HBO
- Release: 1984

The Best Legs in the Eighth Grade is a 1984 made-for-television film about a corporation lawyer who is reunited with his high school ideal at a health club. He makes a date with her, which damages his current relationship. Saint Valentine then appears to the protagonist to help him best understand the path to take. Starring Tim Matheson, Annette O'Toole, Kathryn Harrold and James Belushi. Teleplay by Bruce Feirstein. Directed by Tom Patchett.
