= Finlay Light =

Australian male model

Finlay Light, also known as Finley Light, was an Australian model best known for being briefly considered to play James Bond in the 1980s before Timothy Dalton was eventually cast.

He was one of a number of Australian or New Zealand actors that the Bond producers looked at during this time, others including Mel Gibson, Andrew Clarke, Antony Hamilton and Sam Neill. Light was signed to a ten-year contract but never ended up appearing in the role.
