= Bruce Feirstein =

American screenwriter

- Born: 1956 (age 69–70); Maplewood, New Jersey, U.S.
- Education: Boston University
- Occupations: Writer; humorist
- Spouse: Madeline Warren
- Children: 2

Bruce Feirstein (born 1956) is an American writer and humorist. He is best known for writing the James Bond films GoldenEye (1995), Tomorrow Never Dies (1997), and The World Is Not Enough (1999), and for his best-selling humor books, including Real Men Don't Eat Quiche (1982) and Nice Guys Sleep Alone (1986).

== Early life and education ==
Feirstein was born in 1956 in Maplewood, New Jersey. While in high school, Feirstein had a job changing the lightbulbs on the runways at Newark Liberty International Airport. Feirstein attended Boston University, where he was the managing editor for the student newspaper, The Daily Free Press.

== Career ==
After graduation, he worked as an advertising copywriter, winning 11 Clio Awards, and three One Show Gold Pencils for his work on corporate and political advertising campaigns, for clients including BMW, FedEx, Michael Dukakis, and Sony.

He then became a freelance writer for many publications, including The New York Times Magazine (where he substituted for Russell Baker), The New Republic, New York, The Washington Post, the Los Angeles Times, The New Yorker, The East Hampton Star, and Playboy.

He was a contributing editor at Spy, worked for Howell Raines writing editorials for The New York Times, and has written the (largely) humorous "New Yorker's Diary" for The New York Observer since 1994. He has been a contributing editor at Vanity Fair since 1995, and a columnist at Strategy+Business magazine since 2000. His work has also appeared online at Salon.com and Inside.com.

In television, Feirstein worked very briefly on Saturday Night Live, was an on-air contributor to ABC's Days End, and was nominated for a CableACE Award for his one-act HBO play The Best Legs in the Eighth Grade, starring Tim Matheson and Jim Belushi. He was also the story editor on the Fox series Mr. President, starring George C. Scott and produced by Johnny Carson. He has appeared (as himself) in documentaries about the 1980s, the "Hollywood Award Season", James Bond, and Pierce Brosnan.

Feirstein has also appeared as an on-air political commentator for CNBC and Fox News, and has been interviewed on The Today Show and Good Morning America.

Besides the James Bond series, Feirstein has also worked (uncredited) on screenplays for Will Smith, Bruce Willis, John Travolta, and Julia Roberts, along with the directors John Woo and John McTiernan. He appeared as himself in the 1992 feature film Naked in New York, directed by Daniel Algrant.

In 2007, while continuing to write screenplays in Los Angeles and contribute to Vanity Fair in New York, he began producing movies in China. His first film, 2009's Hóng hé (Red River), the story of the aftermath of the Vietnam War, opened to great critical and commercial acclaim in China. Directed by Jiarui Zhang, it stars Nick Cheung, Danny Lee, and Jingchu Zhang.

In 2008, Feirstein was named to the board of Overseers of Boston University.

=== James Bond ===
In 1995, Feirstein began working within the James Bond franchise by writing (with Jeffrey Caine) the screenplay for the film GoldenEye, with story by Michael France. Feirstein followed this up in 1997 by writing the story and the screenplay for Tomorrow Never Dies. In 1999, Feirstein co-scripted The World Is Not Enough with story writers Neal Purvis and Robert Wade.

Feirstein has also written four video games in the Bond series. In 2004, Feirstein wrote the critically acclaimed Everything or Nothing for developer and publisher Electronic Arts (EA). More recently, Feirstein adapted the 1957 Ian Fleming novel and 1963 film From Russia with Love for a video game of the same name, utilizing the voice and likeness of Sean Connery. In 2010, Activision announced that he would contribute an original story for the next videogame in the series, Blood Stone, for the Xbox 360, PlayStation 3, and PC platforms, along with the remake of GoldenEye 007. As one of the original writers of the GoldenEye film, Feirstein's work on the new game involved updating the plot to a modern setting and in the style of Daniel Craig's interpretation of the character.

== Personal life ==
He lives with his wife, Madeline Warren, and twin children Thomas and Elizabeth in Los Angeles. Warren is a former studio executive responsible for overseeing the production of many feature films, including My Favorite Year (1982), Tin Cup (1996), The Man Who Knew Too Little, and the Oscar-nominated L.A. Confidential (both 1997).

== Bibliography ==
=== Books ===
- Feirstein, Bruce (1982). Real Men Don't Eat Quiche. New York: Pocket Books.
- Feirstein, Bruce (1986). Nice Guys Sleep Alone. NYC: Dell Publishing
- Feirstein, Bruce with Bill O'Reilly (2017). Old School: Life in the Sane Lane. Holt

=== Essays and reporting ===
- Feirstein, Bruce (June 2013). "Guiding knight". Spotlight. Vanity Fair. Vol. 634. p. 93. Sir Ken Robinson.
- Feirstein, Bruce (July 2019). The dawn of the Chinese blockbuster. Strategy+Business

== Filmography ==
=== Writing ===
Year	Title	Notes
1984	The Best Legs in the Eighth Grade	Television film
1987	Mr. President	Episode: "Uncle Sam"
1991	Monsters	Episode: "A Face for Radio"
1995	GoldenEye	Screenplay
1997	Tomorrow Never Dies	Screenplay
1999	The World Is Not Enough	Screenplay
