= French aviso Premier-Maître L'Her =

D'Estienne d'Orves-class aviso of the French Navy

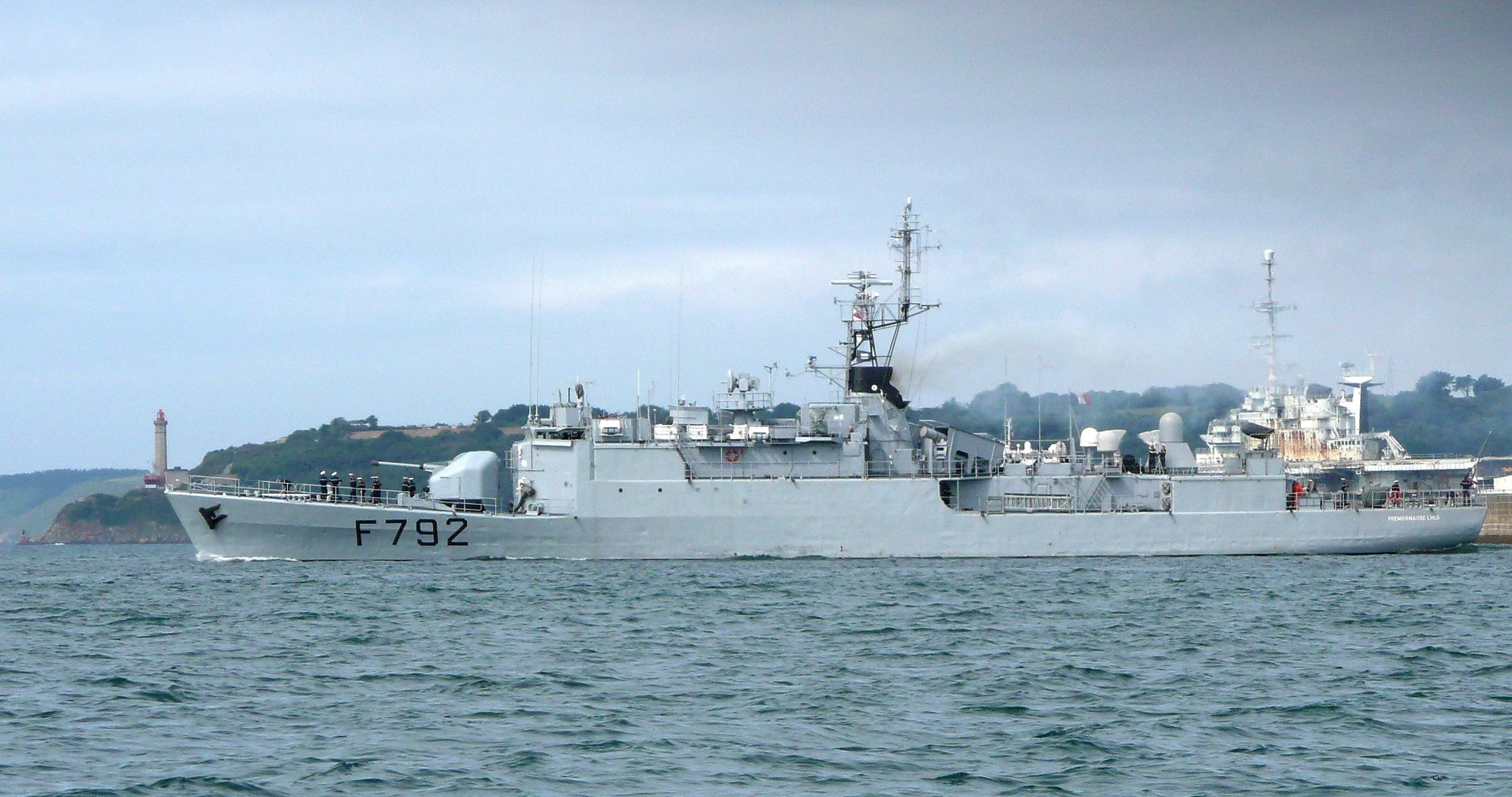
- Premier-Maître L'Her

History

France
- Name: Premier-Maître L'Her
- Namesake: Premier-Maître L'Her
- Builder: Arsenal de Lorient, Lorient
- Laid down: 15 December 1978
- Launched: 28 June 1980
- Commissioned: 5 December 1981
- Decommissioned: 1 July 2024
- Home port: Brest
- Identification: Callsign: FAPM; Pennant number: F792
- Fate: Sunk

General characteristics
- Class & type: D'Estienne d'Orves-class aviso
- Displacement: 1,100 t (1,100 long tons) standard; 1,270 t (1,250 long tons) full load
- Length: 80 m (262 ft 6 in) oa; 76 m (249 ft 4 in) pp
- Beam: 10.3 m (33 ft 10 in)
- Draught: 5.3 m (17 ft 5 in)
- Propulsion: 2 SEMT Pielstick 12 PC 2 V400 diesel engines; 8,900 kW (12,000 bhp), 2 shafts
- Speed: 23.5 knots (43.5 km/h; 27.0 mph)
- Range: 4,500 nmi (8,300 km; 5,200 mi) at 15 knots (28 km/h; 17 mph)
- Complement: 90
- Sensors & processing systems: 1 Air/surface DRBV 51A sentry radar; 1 DRBC 32E fire control radar; 1 Decca 1226 navigation radar; 1 DUBA 25 hull sonar (active sonar capability reportedly retained after conversion to OPV role)
- Electronic warfare & decoys: 1 ARBR 16 radar interceptor; 2 Dagaie decoy launchers; 1 SLQ-25 Nixie countermeasure system
- Armament: 2 Exocet MM38 SSMs (removed from French ships when reclassified as OPVs); 1 × 100 mm CADAM gun turret with Najir fire control system and CMS LYNCEA; 2 × 20 mm modèle F2 guns; 4 × 12.7 mm machine guns; 4 × L3 or L5 type torpedoes in four fixed catapults (removed from French ships when reclassified as OPVs); 1 × sextuple Bofors 375 mm rocket launcher (removed from French ships when reclassified as OPVs)

Premier-Maître L'Her (F792) was a D'Estienne d'Orves-class aviso in the French Navy.

== Design ==
The aviso had a crew of 90 sailors, and vessels of this class have the reputation of being among the most difficult in bad weather. Their high windage makes them particularly sensitive to pitch and roll as soon as the sea is formed.

Their armament, consequent for a vessel of this tonnage, allows them to manage a large spectrum of missions. During the Cold War, they were primarily used to patrol the continental shelf of the Atlantic Ocean in search of Soviet Navy submarines. Due to the poor performance of the hull sonar, as soon as an echo appeared, the reinforcement of an ASM frigate was necessary to chase it using her towed variable depth sonar.

Their role as patrollers now consists mainly of patrols and assistance missions, as well as participation in UN missions (blockades, flag checks) or similar marine policing tasks (fight against drugs, extraction of nationals, fisheries control, etc.). The mer-mer 38 or mer-mer 40 missiles have been landed, but they carry several machine guns and machine guns, more suited to their new missions.

The ships construction cost was estimated at 270,000,000 French francs.

== Construction and career ==
Premier-Maître L'Her was laid down on 15 December 1978 at Arsenal de Lorient, Lorient. Launched on 28 June 1980 and commissioned on 5 December 1981. Her first mission was as part of Operation Olifant off the coast of Beirut in 1982.

On 1 January 2009, the ship which participated in the European anti-piracy mission Operation Atalanta east of the Gulf of Aden, responded twice to distress calls from a cargo ship under the flag of Panama. After the freighter's second distress call, the pirates having fled shortly before during the first. The aviso spotted and then stopped the two pirate boats on board which were eight Somalis, armed with six AK-47 assault rifles and a RPG-7 rocket launcher. The suspected pirates were then held aboard the ship en route to the Somali coast to hand them over to the authorities of this country.

In February 2013, the ship participated in Operation Serval for one month.

From 21 October to 20 December 2017, the vessel was engaged in the EU Navfor Med Sophia mission during which she participated in the rescue of two boats in difficulty. The ship was notably in the area during the events of 6 November 2017.

From 29 March to 15 April 2019, the ship participated in the NATO military exercise Exercise Joint Warrior. Despite the vessel's weak means of detection, the ship was appointed lead of the anti-submarine warfare force. In December 2022, the Navy Mini Drone System (SMDM) was installed on the ship to enhance her surveillance capabilities. The drone was described as being able to film and photograph and track, in real time, targets up to 25 nautical miles (46 km; 29 mi) distant from the ship.

In January 2023 Premier-Maître L'Her arrived for a three-month deployment in the Gulf of Guinea for counter-illegal fishing and counter-smuggling operations.

In April 2024, Premier-Maître L'Her returned to Brest completing a final two month deployment in the Atlantic. She sailed for the last time in June ahead of her decommissioning on 1 July. The ship was eventually to be replaced by one of a new class of ocean-going patrol vessels (the Patrouilleurs Hauturiers).

She was sunk on 14 December 2024 during the test of a F21 heavy torpedo, fired by a submarine.
