= Real Men Don't Eat Quiche =

1982 humor book by Bruce Feirstein

- Author: Bruce Feirstein
- Publication date: 1982
- ISBN: 0-671-44831-5

Real Men Don't Eat Quiche is a best-selling tongue-in-cheek book satirizing stereotypes of masculinity by the American screenwriter and humorist Bruce Feirstein, published in 1982 (ISBN 0-671-44831-5).

The title alludes to the gender associations of quiche as a "feminine" food in American culture, which causes men to avoid it and has served as the basis of the title of multiple journal articles. To gain free publicity the publisher sent copies of the book to radio personalities and newspaper columnists, and the witty "real men don't ..." definitions were widely quoted. Listeners and readers then bought the book for more of the definitions.

The book was on The New York Times Best Seller list for 55 weeks and sold over 1.6 million copies. An Australian adaptation by Alex Buzo was published later that year.
