= GoldenEye =

1995 James Bond film by Martin Campbell

- British theatrical release poster by Terry O'Neill, Keith Hamshere and George Whitear
- Directed by: Martin Campbell
- Screenplay by: Jeffrey Caine; Bruce Feirstein
- Story by: Michael France
- Based on: James Bond by Ian Fleming
- Produced by: Michael G. Wilson; Barbara Broccoli
- Starring: Pierce Brosnan; Sean Bean; Izabella Scorupco; Famke Janssen; Joe Don Baker; Judi Dench
- Cinematography: Phil Méheux
- Edited by: Terry Rawlings
- Music by: Éric Serra
- Production companies: United Artists; Eon Productions Limited
- Distributed by: MGM/UA Distribution Co. (United States); United International Pictures (International)
- Release dates: 13 November 1995 (Radio City Music Hall); 17 November 1995 (US); 24 November 1995 (UK)
- Running time: 130 minutes
- Countries: United Kingdom; United States
- Language: English
- Budget: $60 million
- Box office: $356.4 million

GoldenEye is a 1995 spy film, the seventeenth in the James Bond series produced by Eon Productions, and the first to star Pierce Brosnan as the fictional MI6 agent James Bond. Directed by Martin Campbell, it was the first in the series not to use any story elements from the works of novelist Ian Fleming. It was also the first James Bond film not produced by Albert R. Broccoli, following his retirement from Eon Productions and replacement by his daughter, Barbara Broccoli (along with Michael G. Wilson, although Broccoli was still involved as a consultant producer; it was his final film project before his death in 1996). The story was conceived and written by Michael France, with later collaboration by other writers. In the film, Bond fights to prevent rogue ex-MI6 agent Alec Trevelyan (Sean Bean) from using a satellite weapon against London to cause a global financial collapse.

GoldenEye was released after a six-year hiatus in the series caused by legal disputes, during which Timothy Dalton's contract for the role of James Bond expired and he decided to leave the role, being replaced by Brosnan. M was also recast, actress Judi Dench becoming the first woman to portray the character, replacing Robert Brown. The role of Miss Moneypenny was also recast, Caroline Bliss being replaced by Samantha Bond. Desmond Llewelyn was the only actor to reprise his previous role, as Q. It was the first Bond film made after the dissolution of the Soviet Union and the end of the Cold War, which provided a background for the plot. Principal photography took place from January to June 1995 in the UK, Russia, Monte Carlo, and Puerto Rico; it was the inaugural film production to be shot at Leavesden Studios. The first Bond film to use computer-generated imagery (CGI), GoldenEye was also the final film in the career of special effects supervisor Derek Meddings, and was dedicated to his memory.

The film accumulated a worldwide gross of over US$356 million, to become the fourth-highest grossing film of 1995. It received positive reviews from critics, with Brosnan viewed as a worthy successor to Sean Connery's portrayal as Bond. It also received award nominations for Best Special Visual Effects and Best Sound from the British Academy of Film and Television Arts. It was followed by Tomorrow Never Dies in 1997.

== Plot ==
In 1986, MI6 agents James Bond and Alec Trevelyan infiltrate a clandestine Soviet chemical weapons lab in Arkhangelsk. After witnessing Trevelyan seemingly being executed by the facility's commanding officer, Colonel Arkady Grigorovich Ourumov, Bond destroys the site and escapes in a stolen airplane.

Nine years later, following the dissolution of the Soviet Union, Bond attempts to prevent Xenia Onatopp, a member of the Janus crime syndicate, from hijacking a Eurocopter Tiger attack helicopter during a military demonstration in Monte Carlo, but is unsuccessful. Returning to MI6 headquarters in London, Bond joins MI6 staff monitoring an incident in Severnaya, Siberia, after the stolen helicopter turns up at a radar site there. After the occupants are murdered, an electromagnetic pulse blast suddenly hits the site, obliterating it and several Russian fighter jets, while knocking out some satellite systems in orbit.

The newly appointed M assigns Bond to investigate, after it is determined that the blast came from a Soviet-era satellite armed with a nuclear electromagnetic pulse space-based weapon, codenamed "GoldenEye". Although Janus is believed of initiating the attack, Bond suspects that Ourumov, now a general, was involved, because the weapon system required high-level military access. Flying to Saint Petersburg, Bond contacts CIA operative Jack Wade, and is advised to meet the former KGB agent turned gangster, Valentin Dmitrovich Zukovsky, and have him arrange a meeting with Janus. Escorted to the meeting by Onatopp, Bond discovers that Janus is led by Trevelyan, who had faked his demise. He learns that Trevelyan seeks vengeance for his parents, Lienz Cossacks who were betrayed by the British and repatriated to the Soviet Union after collaborating with the Axis powers during World War II.

Bond is sedated by a dart and trapped in the Tiger alongside computer programmer Natalya Simonova, a survivor of the Severnaya attack. After escaping the helicopter before it explodes, the pair are taken into custody at the Military Archives and interrogated by Russian Minister of Defence Dimitri Mishkin. Natalya affirms Ourumov's involvement in the use of GoldenEye, and that fellow programmer Boris Grishenko survived along with her and is now working for Janus in operating a second GoldenEye satellite. Before Mishkin can act on the information, Ourumov kills him and takes Natalya by car to a missile train used by Trevelyan and Onatopp. Bond pursues Ourumov in a T-55 tank, which he uses to derail the train. Once onboard, Bond kills Ourumov while Trevelyan rigs the train to explode and flies off in a helicopter with Onatopp. Bond and Natalya retreat seconds before the explosion.

Bond and Natalya travel to Cuba, after Boris is traced to a location within the island's jungles by Natalya. While flying over the area in their plane, they are shot down by a missile. Onatopp is lowered from a helicopter and attacks them but Bond shoots down the helicopter she is still tethered to, and gets pulled into the branches of a tree, the force of the helicopter weight kills her in the process. Bond and Natalya watch a hidden base with satellite dish reveal itself when it drains a large artificial lake. They gain entry but Bond is captured while setting remote mines. Trevelyan tells Bond that he plans to embezzle money from the Bank of England then use the remaining GoldenEye to erase its financial records and conceal the theft. Trevelyan expects the electromagnetic pulse to trigger a global financial meltdown and social collapse, causing the United Kingdom to "re-enter the Stone Age".

Natalya hacks into the satellite and reprograms it to initiate atmospheric re-entry and thus destroy itself, while changing the access codes. She is then captured as well. While trying to reverse her programming, Boris nervously presses on a pen confiscated from Bond along with his watch, activating a grenade concealed in the pen by Q Branch. Bond knocks the pen from Boris's hand and into a pool of fuel which leaked from a set of containers during an earlier firefight, causing a chemical explosion that allows Bond and Natalya to escape.

To prevent Boris from regaining control of the satellite, Bond sabotages the dish's antenna by jamming its gears. Trevelyan tries to intercept him, and the ensuing fight between them culminates in Trevelyan being dangled below the antenna on a transmitter. Bond then drops Trevelyan into the bottom of the dish, severely injuring him. The GoldenEye satellite subsequently disintegrates. Natalya soon rescues Bond in a commandeered helicopter, moments before the antenna malfunctions and explodes, destroying the base. The debris falls onto Trevelyan, killing him instantly, and Boris is frozen solid by a cascade caused by ruptured liquid nitrogen canisters. After landing in a meadow, Bond and Natalya prepare to enjoy some solitude together but are interrupted by the arrival of Wade and a team of U.S. Marines, who escort them to Guantanamo Bay Naval Base.

== Cast ==
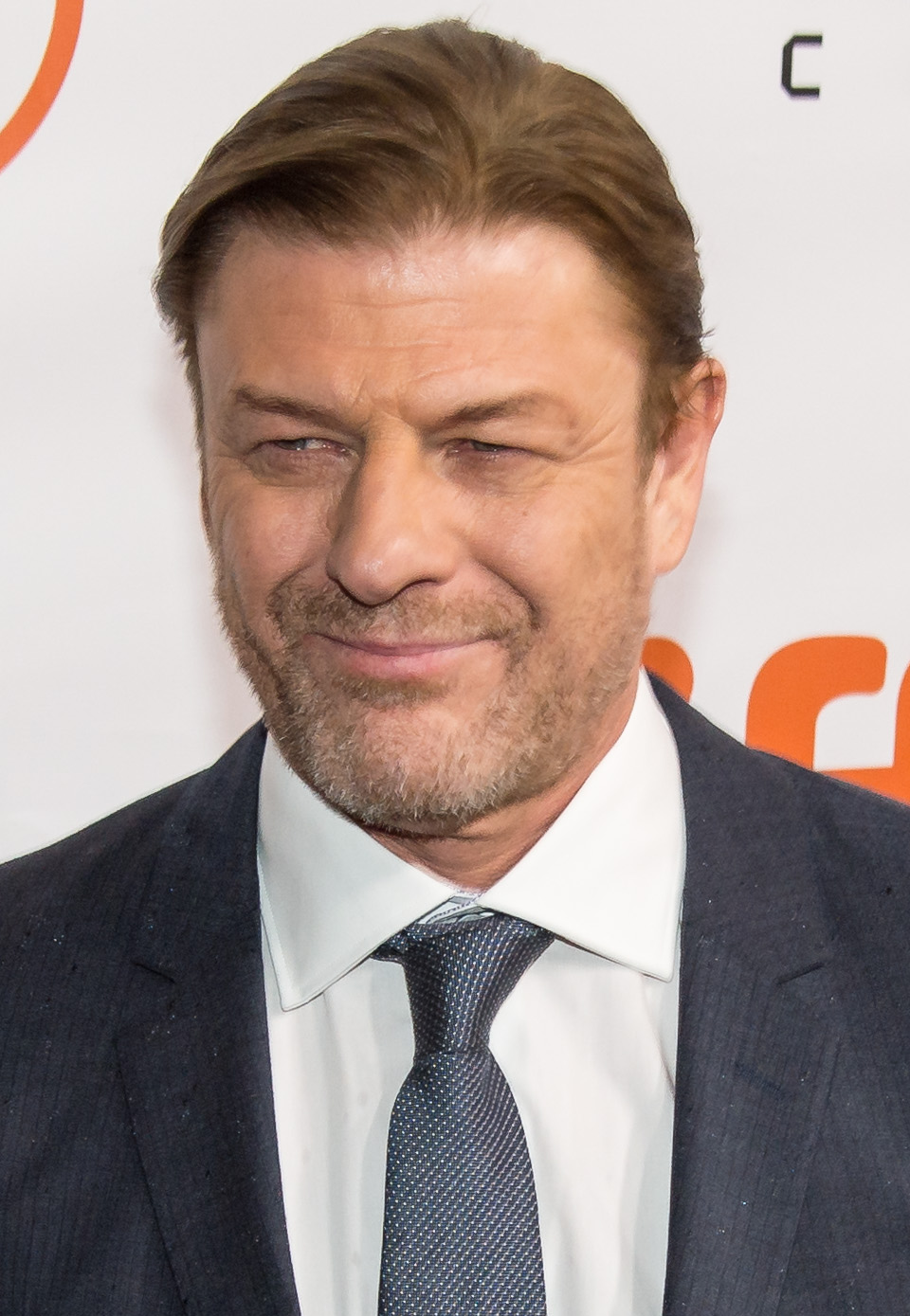
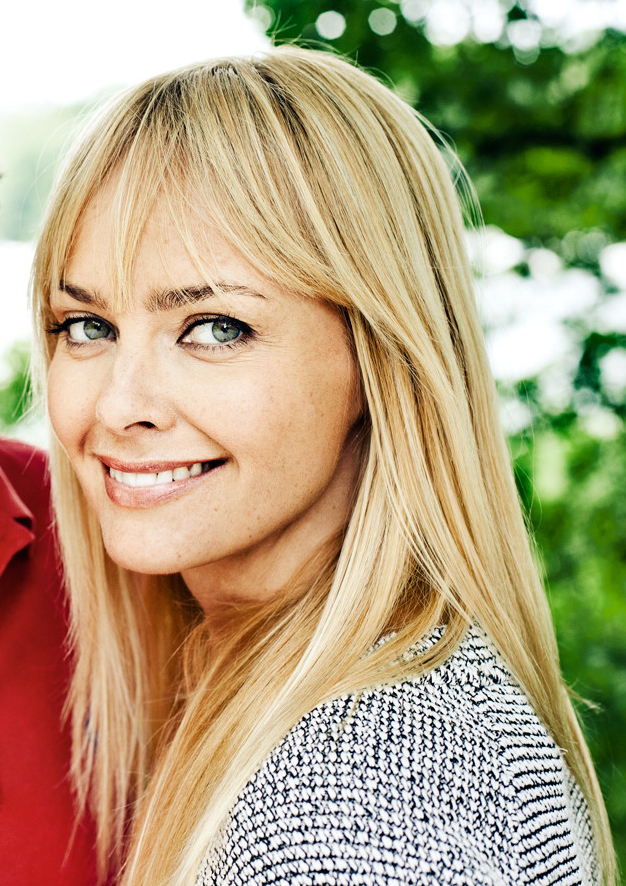
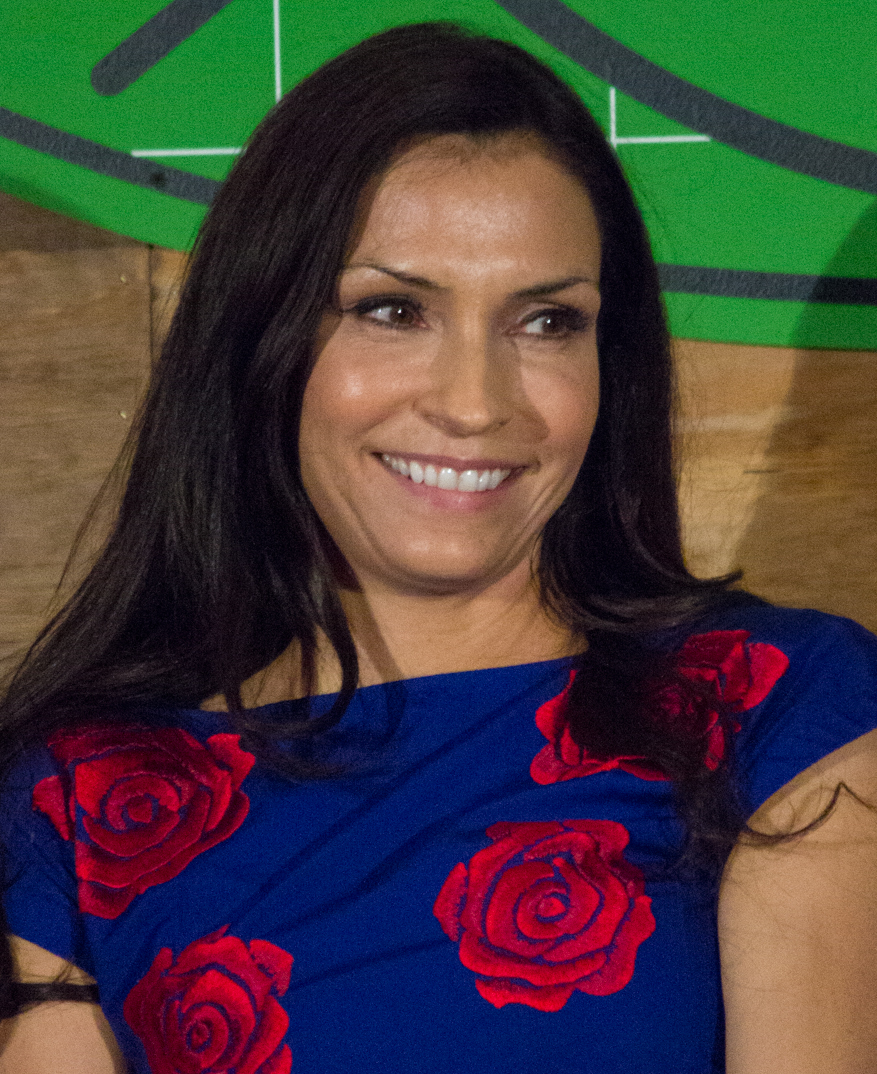
Pierce Brosnan (far left) in 2017, Sean Bean (in 2015), Izabella Scorupco (in 2013) and Famke Janssen in 2013
- Pierce Brosnan as James Bond (007), an MI6 officer assigned to stop the Janus crime syndicate from acquiring "GoldenEye", a clandestine satellite weapon designed and launched by the Soviets during the Cold War.
- Sean Bean as Alec Trevelyan (006), initially another 00 officer and Bond's close friend, he fakes his death at Arkhangelsk and then establishes the Janus crime syndicate over the following nine years.
- Izabella Scorupco as Natalya Simonova, a programmer at the Severnaya lab. She is one of two survivors of the GoldenEye attack on its own control centre.
- Famke Janssen as Xenia Onatopp, a lustful Georgian fighter pilot and Trevelyan's henchwoman.
- Joe Don Baker as Jack Wade, a veteran CIA officer on the same mission as Bond. Baker previously played the villainous Brad Whitaker in The Living Daylights (1987) and would reprise the role of Wade in Tomorrow Never Dies (1997).
- Robbie Coltrane as Valentin Dmitrovich Zukovsky, a Russian gangster and ex-KGB officer through whom Bond arranges a meeting with Janus.
- Tchéky Karyo as Dimitri Mishkin, the Russian Defence Minister.
- Gottfried John as General Arkady Grigorovich Ourumov, a Hero of the Soviet Union, Commander of Russia's Space Division. He is secretly an agent of Janus, who abuses his authority and position to obtain control over GoldenEye.
- Alan Cumming as Boris Grishenko, a geeky computer programmer at Severnaya who survives the GoldenEye attack, and is later revealed to be an affiliate of Janus.
- Michael Kitchen as Bill Tanner, M's chief of staff.
- Serena Gordon as Caroline, an MI6 psychological and psychiatric evaluator whom Bond seduces at the beginning of the film.
- Desmond Llewelyn as Q, the head of Q Branch (research and development division of the British Secret Service).
- Samantha Bond as Miss Moneypenny, M's secretary.
- Judi Dench as M, the head of MI6 and Bond's superior.
- Minnie Driver as Irina, Zukovsky's tone-deaf mistress.

Other actors in the film include: Billy J. Mitchell as Chuck Farrel, a Royal Canadian Navy admiral whom Xenia seduces and kills in order to facilitate the theft of the Eurocopter Tiger attack helicopter; Wayne Michaels, who was Brosnan's stunt man, appears as a Tiger Helicopter Pilot, Michelle Arthur as Anna, Natalya's co-worker in Severnaya; Simon Kunz as the Severnaya duty officer, and Constantine Gregory as a Moscow computer salesman. Producer Michael G. Wilson makes his requisite cameo appearance as a member of the Russian Security Council.

== Development ==
Following the release of Licence to Kill in July 1989, pre-production work for the seventeenth film in the James Bond series, the third to star Timothy Dalton (fulfilling his three-film contract), began in May 1990. A poster for the then-upcoming movie was even featured in the Carlton Hotel during the 1990 Cannes Film Festival. In August, The Sunday Times reported that producer Albert R. Broccoli had parted company with screenwriter Richard Maibaum, who had worked on the scripts of all but three Bond films so far, and director John Glen, responsible for the previous five instalments in the series. That same year, Broccoli met with potential directors, which included John Landis, Ted Kotcheff, Roger Spottiswoode (who would later direct Tomorrow Never Dies), and John Byrum.

Broccoli's stepson Michael G. Wilson contributed a script, and Wiseguy co-producer Alfonse Ruggiero Jr. was hired to rewrite it. Filming was set to begin in 1990 in Hong Kong, for a release in late 1991. A 17-page treatment, dated May 1990, featured James Bond on a mission in East Asia, where he must investigate why an unknown entity caused a chemical plant in Scotland to explode inexplicably and a threat ordering the British and Chinese to relinquish their authority over Hong Kong. Bond would be aided by an ex-CIA freelance thief named Connie Webb and a senior spy named Denholm Crisp, with the trail leading towards a corrupt technology magnate called Sir Henry Lee Ching. It also would have featured the Chinese Ministry of State Security.

Wilson and Ruggiero revised the plotline further in a script dated July 1990. It changed the opening to show Bond using a hang-gliding competition as cover to infiltrate a chemical weapons plant, where he must fend off a deadly security robot. The film proper begins in the South China Sea, where a British Harrier jet malfunctions, ejects its pilot, starts flying on its own, and then crashes into a village in China. MI6 subsequently learns that many British military technology manufacturing plants have been recently broken into and Bond is sent to track down the burglar. This draft also featured a climax in which the villain survived the destruction of their lair and subsequently attempted to kill Bond.

In January 1991, the script was further rewritten by William Osborne and William Davies. After the Gulf War, the chemical plant opening from the prior script was revised to take place in Libya. The film would then have focused on the theft of a high-tech stealth fighter by American mobsters, with Bond trying to find it, first in Vancouver and then in Las Vegas. The aircraft is subsequently secured by a Hong Kong-based industrialist, Sir Henry Ferguson, who wants to use it to allow a Chinese military general to stage a nuclear attack and coup d'état against Mainland China, with the general then leaving the industrialist in control of Hong Kong.

Dalton declared in a 2010 interview that the script had been ready and "we were talking directors" before the project entered development hell caused by legal problems between Metro-Goldwyn-Mayer, parent company of the series' distributor United Artists, and Broccoli's Danjaq, owners of the Bond film rights. In 1990, MGM/UA was to be sold for $1.5 billion to Qintex, an Australian-American financial services company that had begun making television broadcast and entertainment purchases. When Qintex could not provide a $50 million letter of credit, the deal fell apart. Italian financier Giancarlo Parretti, CEO of Pathé Entertainment (unrelated to the French studio Pathé) quickly moved in to buy MGM/UA for $1.2 billion and merged the companies to create MGM-Pathé Communications. Parretti intended to sell off the distribution rights of the studio's catalogue so that he could collect advance payments to finance the buyout. This included international broadcasting rights to the 007 library at cut-rate prices, leading Danjaq to sue, alleging that the licensing violated the Bond distribution agreements the company made with United Artists in 1962, while denying Danjaq a share of the profits. Countersuits were filed. When asked what he would do following resolution of the lawsuits, Dalton told Broccoli that it was unlikely that he would continue in the role.

Parretti's behaviour led to the bankruptcy of MGM-Pathé, and additional lawsuits eventually resulted in a foreclosure by financial backer Crédit Lyonnais in 1992. The Bond rights lawsuits were settled in December 1992, and the renamed Metro-Goldwyn-Mayer, now run by a Crédit Lyonnais subsidiary, began to explore further development of Bond 17 with Danjaq in 1993. Dalton was still Broccoli's choice to play Bond, but the star's original seven-year contract with Danjaq expired that same year. Dalton has stated that the delay to his third film effectively ended the contract in 1990.

== Production ==
=== Pre-production and writing ===
In May 1993, MGM announced that a seventeenth James Bond film was in pre-production, to be based on a screenplay by Michael France. France studied for his script by travelling to Russia to interview former KGB agents and visit nuclear research laboratories. With Broccoli's health deteriorating (he died seven months after the release of GoldenEye), his daughter Barbara Broccoli described him as taking "a bit of a back seat" in the film's production. Barbara and Michael G. Wilson took the lead roles in production, while Albert Broccoli oversaw the production of GoldenEye as a consulting producer, credited as "presenter". Wilson wanted to frame the film in the post-Cold War era and the aftermath of the collapse of the Soviet Union, when there were concerns about proliferation of weapons of mass destruction. Broccoli contacted Dalton, to ask again if he would come back, and now found him open to the idea.

In August 1993, France, having turned in his first draft, continued to work on the script. In further discussion with Broccoli, Dalton expressed excitement over taking the best elements of his previous two films and combining them as a basis for one final film. Broccoli stressed that, after the long gap without a film, Dalton could not come back and just do a single film but needed to return for multiple films. Although France's screenplay was completed by January 1994, production was pushed back with no concrete start. In April 1994, Dalton officially resigned from the role. In a 2014 interview, Dalton revealed that he agreed with Broccoli's expectation but could not commit to appearing in four or five more films.

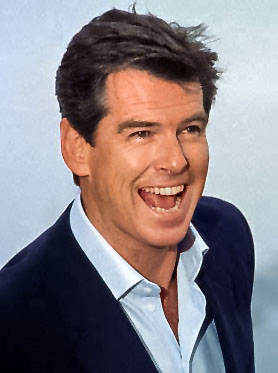
GoldenEye was Pierce Brosnan's first appearance as Bond.

Further work was done on the screenplay throughout 1994. France's screenplay introduced the character of "Augustus Trevelyan", Bond's MI6 superior and a defector to Soviet Union, as the main villain. As in the completed version, his scheme involved a stolen orbital EMP weapon. The first draft started with an Aston Martin car chase aboard a high-speed train. However, Barbara Broccoli was concerned that France's screenplay was still too unstructured and brought in Jeffrey Caine to rewrite it. Caine kept many of France's ideas but added the prologue before the credits and rewrote Trevelyan closer to his iteration in the final film. Kevin Wade did a three-week rewrite and Bruce Feirstein added the finishing touches. In the film, the writing credit was shared by Caine and Feirstein, while France was credited with only the story, an arrangement he felt was unfair, particularly as he believed that the additions made were not an improvement on his original version. Wade did not receive an official credit, but was acknowledged in the naming of Jack Wade, the CIA character he created.

The opening scene, in which an admiral is seduced and then killed, had to be rewritten following a demand from the US military, after which the nationality of the admiral was changed from American to Canadian.

While the story was not based on a work by Ian Fleming, the title GoldenEye came from the name of Fleming's Jamaican estate, where he wrote the Bond novels. Fleming gave a number of origins for the name of his estate, including Carson McCullers's Reflections in a Golden Eye and Operation Goldeneye, a contingency plan Fleming himself developed during the Second World War in case of a Nazi invasion through Spain.

Although GoldenEye was released only six years after Licence to Kill, world politics had changed dramatically in the interim. It was the first James Bond film to be produced after the fall of the Berlin Wall, the collapse of the Soviet Union, and the end of the Cold War, and there was doubt over the character's relevance in the modern world. Some in the film industry felt it would be "futile" for the Bond series to make a comeback, and that the character was best left as "an icon of the past". The producers even thought of new concepts for the series, such as a period piece set in the 1960s, a female 007, or a black James Bond. Ultimately, they chose to return to the earlier films' characterisation of Bond as a "sexist", in contrast to the Bond of the Dalton films. The film came to be seen as a successful revitalisation, and it effectively adapted the series for the 1990s. One of GoldenEye's notable changes includes the casting of a female M, who accordingly characterises Bond as a "sexist, misogynist dinosaur" and a "relic of the Cold War".

John Woo was approached as the director, and turned down the opportunity, but said he was honoured by the offer. Michael Caton-Jones and Peter Medak were also considered. The producers then chose New Zealander Martin Campbell as the director. Brosnan later described Campbell as "warrior-like in his take on the piece" and said that "there was a huge passion there on both our parts".

=== Casting ===
To replace Dalton, the producers chose Pierce Brosnan, who, after Dalton had initially turned down the role, had been prevented from succeeding Roger Moore in 1986 because of his contract to continue starring in the television series Remington Steele. He was introduced to the public at a press conference at the Regent Palace Hotel on 8 June 1994. Before negotiating with Brosnan, Mel Gibson, Hugh Grant, and Liam Neeson passed on the role. Neeson said that his then fiancée Natasha Richardson would not marry him if he accepted the role. Broccoli and Campbell met with Ralph Fiennes to discuss his taking the part. Fiennes later played Gareth Mallory / M in Skyfall (2012), Spectre (2015), and No Time to Die (2021). Paul McGann auditioned for the role and was the studio's second choice if Brosnan turned it down. Brosnan was paid $1.2 million for the film, out of a total budget of $60 million. The English actress Judi Dench was cast as M, replacing Robert Brown, making this the first film of the series to feature a female M. The decision is widely believed to have been inspired by Stella Rimington, who had become head of MI5 in 1992.

The character of Alec Trevelyan was originally scripted as "Augustus Trevelyan" and envisaged as an older character and a mentor to Bond. Anthony Hopkins and Alan Rickman were reportedly sought for the role, but both turned it down. Sean Bean was subsequently cast and the character was rewritten as Bond's peer. The character of Natalya Simionova, originally scripted as "Marina Varoskaya", was supposed to be Paulina Porizkova, but Izabella Scorupco was subsequently cast. The character of Boris Griscenko was originally scripted as "Alexei Makvenio", but Alan Cumming was still in the early cast. The character of Valentin Zukovsky was originally scripted as Valentin Kosgyn, aka Romaly. The character of General Ourumov was originally named "Illya Borchenko". The character General Pushkin from The Living Daylights appeared in France's initial script, but the character was rewritten as Defense Minister Mishkin.

=== Filming ===
Principal photography for the film began on 16 January 1995 and continued until 2 June. Eon was unable to film at Pinewood Studios, the usual studio for Bond films, because it had been reserved for First Knight. Instead, with little time to find a space which could hold the number of large scale sets needed for production, Eon found an old Rolls-Royce factory at Leavesden Aerodrome in Hertfordshire, which had wide, tall, and open aircraft hangars that were uniquely suited to be converted into stages for a new studio. Eon leased the site for the duration of their shoot, gutted the factory and turned it into stages, workshops and offices, and dubbed it Leavesden Studios.

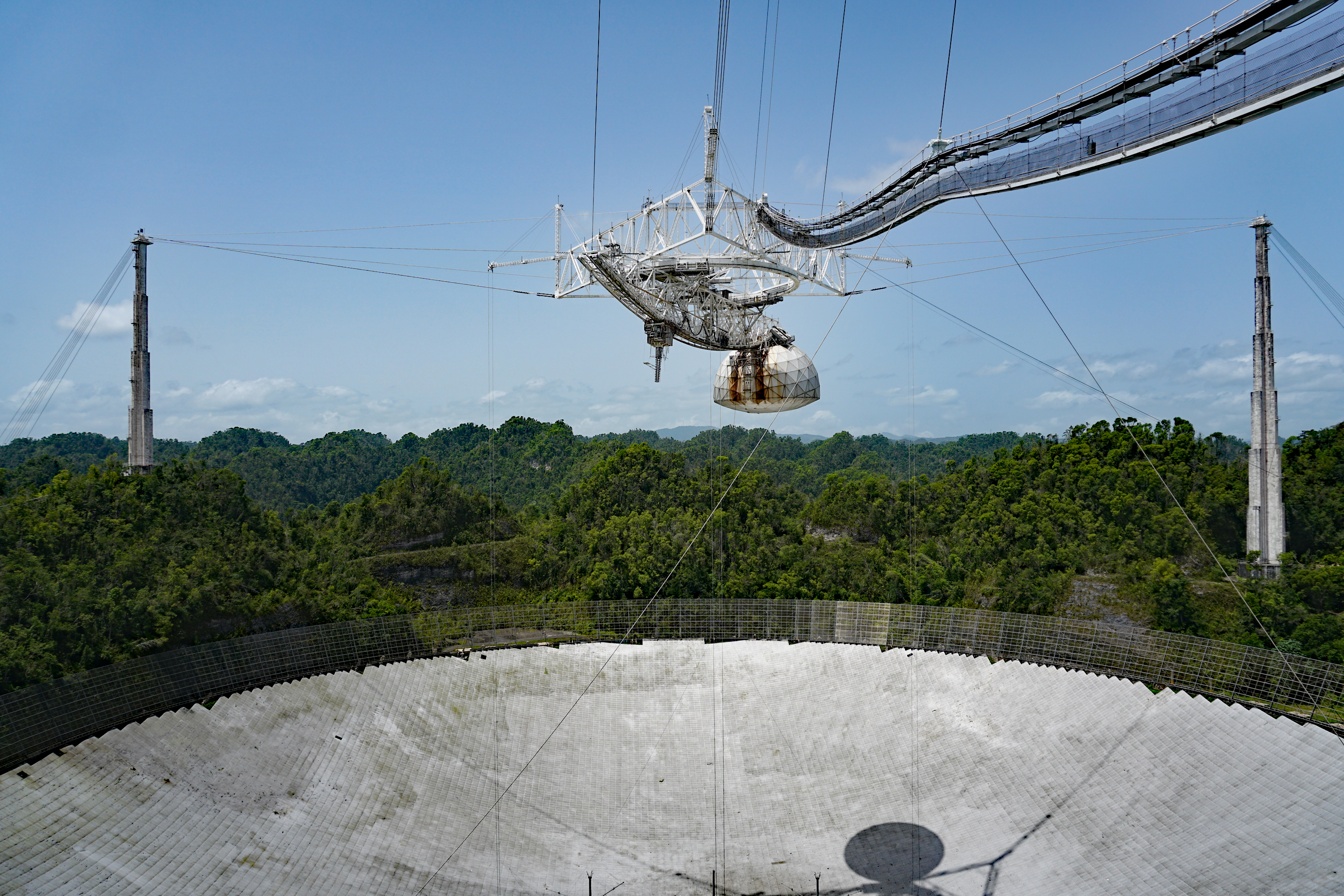
The Arecibo Observatory was the site of the film's climactic scene.

The bungee jump was filmed at the Contra Dam (also known as the Verzasca or Locarno Dam) in Ticino, Switzerland. General Ourumov shooting his nervously-firing soldier in the opening sequence was inspired by the 1969 western film The Wild Bunch. The casino scenes and the Tiger helicopter's demonstration were shot in Monte Carlo. Reference footage for the tank chase was shot on location in Saint Petersburg and matched to the studio at Leavesden. The climactic scenes on the satellite dish were shot at Arecibo Observatory in Puerto Rico. The actual MI6 headquarters were used for external views of M's office. Some of the scenes in St. Petersburg were shot in London, such as the Royal Box at Epsom Downs Racecourse which was used as the airport front. This reduced expenses and security concerns, as the second unit sent to Russia required bodyguards.

The French Navy provided full use of the frigate La Fayette and their newest helicopter, the Eurocopter Tiger, to the film's production team. The French government also allowed the use of Navy logos as part of the promotional campaign for it. However, the producers had a dispute with the French Ministry of Defence over Brosnan's opposition to French nuclear weapons testing and his involvement with Greenpeace; as a result, the French premiere of the film was cancelled.

The sequences involving the armoured train were filmed on the Nene Valley Railway, near Peterborough. The train was composed of a British Rail Class 20 diesel-electric locomotive and a pair of Mark 1 coaches, all three heavily disguised to resemble a Soviet armoured train.

=== Effects ===
GoldenEye's opening title sequence featured a woman destroying the hammer and sickle.

The film was the last one of special effects supervisor Derek Meddings, to whom it was dedicated. Meddings' major contribution was miniatures. It was also the first Bond film to use computer-generated imagery with effects provided by Cinesite and Moving Picture Company (MPC). Among the model effects are most external shots of Severnaya, the scene where Janus' train crashes into the tank, and the lake which hides the satellite dish, since the producers could not find a round lake in Puerto Rico. The climax in the satellite dish used scenes in Arecibo, a model built by Meddings' team and scenes shot with stuntmen in Britain.

Stunt car coordinator Rémy Julienne described the car chase between the Aston Martin DB5 and the Ferrari F355 as between "a perfectly shaped, old and vulnerable vehicle and a racecar." The stunt had to be meticulously planned as the cars are vastly different. Nails had to be attached to the F355 tyres to make it skid, and during one take of the sliding vehicles, the two cars collided.

The largest stunt sequence in the film was the tank chase, which took around six weeks to film, partly on location in St. Petersburg and partly on the old de Havilland runway at Leavesden. According to second-unit director Ian Sharp it was thought up by special effects supervisor Chris Corbould, during a pre-production meeting that lasted only ten minutes. Parts of the tank chase were filmed at the backlot of Leavesden, parts on location in St. Petersburg. The whole chase was storyboarded very carefully, said Sharp. A Russian T-54/T-55 tank, on loan from the East England Military Museum, was modified with the addition of fake explosive reactive armour panels. To avoid destroying the pavement on the city streets of St. Petersburg, the steel off-road tracks of the T-54/55 were replaced with the rubber-shoed tracks from a British Chieftain tank. The T-55 tank used in the film is now on permanent display at Old Buckenham Airfield, where the East England Military Museum is based.

For the confrontation between Bond and Trevelyan inside the antenna cradle, director Campbell decided to take inspiration from Bond's fight with Red Grant in From Russia with Love. Brosnan and Bean did all the stunts themselves, except for one take where one is thrown against the wall. Brosnan injured his hand while filming the extending ladder sequence, making producers delay his scenes and film the ones in Severnaya earlier.

The opening 220 m (720 ft) bungee jump at Arkhangelsk, shot at the Contra Dam in Switzerland and performed by Wayne Michaels, was voted the best movie stunt of all time in a 2002 Sky Movies poll, and set a record for the highest bungee jump off a fixed structure. The ending of the pre-credits sequence with Bond jumping after the aeroplane features Jacques Malnuit riding the motorcycle to the edge and jumping, and B.J. Worth diving after the plane – which was a working aircraft, with Worth adding that part of the difficulty of the stunt was the kerosene striking his face.

The dissolution of the Soviet Union is the main focus of the opening titles, designed by Daniel Kleinman (who took over from Maurice Binder after his death in 1991). They show the collapse and destruction of several structures associated with the Soviet Union, such as the red star, statues of Communist leaders—notably Joseph Stalin—and the hammer and sickle. In an interview, Kleinman said they were meant to be "a kind of story telling sequence" showing that "what was happening in Communist countries was Communism was falling down". According to producer Michael G. Wilson, some Communist parties protested against "Socialist symbols being destroyed not by governments, but by bikini-clad women", especially certain Indian Communist parties, which threatened to boycott the film.

=== Product placement ===
The film was the first one bound by BMW's three-picture deal, so the producers were offered BMW's latest roadster, the BMW Z3. It was featured in the film months before its release, and a limited edition "007 model" sold out within a day of being available to order. As part of the car's marketing strategy, several Z3's were used to drive journalists from a complimentary meal at the Rainbow Room restaurant to its premiere at the Radio City Music Hall.

For the film, a convertible Z3 is equipped with what Q calls "all the usual refinements", including a self-destruct feature and Stinger missiles behind the headlights. The Z3 does not have much screen time and none of the gadgets are used, which Martin Campbell attributed to the deal with BMW coming in the last stages of production. The Z3's appearance in the film is thought to be the most successful promotion through product placement in 1995. Ten years later, The Hollywood Reporter listed it as one of the most successful product placements in recent years. The article quoted Mary Lou Galician, head of media analysis and criticism at Arizona State University's Walter Cronkite School of Journalism and Mass Communication, as saying that the news coverage of Bond's switch from Aston Martin to BMW "generated hundreds of millions of dollars of media exposure for the movie and all of its marketing partners."

In addition, all computers in the film were provided by IBM, and in some scenes (such as the pen grenade scene towards the end), the OS/2 Warp splash screen can be seen on computer monitors. During the Q Lab scene, James Bond can be seen using an IBM ThinkPad laptop ignoring Q's instructions on the use of a leather belt modified with a piton gun. This moment was not present in early drafts of the film, but it is understood that director Martin Campbell had 007 fiddling with the keyboard of this computer as a way to show Bond was visibly ignoring the Quartermaster, but also as a way to increase IBM's product placement arrangement.

A modified Omega Seamaster Professional Diver 300M wristwatch features as a spy gadget device several times in the film, concealing a cutting laser and detonator remote. This was the first time Bond was shown to be wearing a watch by Omega, and he has since worn Omega watches in every subsequent production. While the scene of the tank running through a truck full of drinks was storyboarded with a Pepsi truck, Perrier signed in a deal to be featured, providing around 90,000 cans for the scene.

=== Marketing ===
As James Bond entered in the 1990s, hand-painted poster designs were eschewed in favour of cutting-edge photomontage tools, promoting the return of 007 portrayed by Pierce Brosnan. Under the direction of John Parkinson and Gordon Arnell from the marketing department of MGM, many posters were produced for the film designed by Randi Braun and Earl Klasky with photographs taken by John Stoddart, Terry O'Neill, Keith Hamshere and George Withear. In the United States, an advance poster featured a gold-hued close-up on Bond's eyes pointing his Walther PPK handgun towards the viewer. The logo of the film was not displayed, only a tagline: "There is no substitute" and the 007 gun logo, in red. For the international market, a different advance poster was issued on which Pierce Brosnan appeared in black dinner jacket holding his silenced PPK gun, next to a 007 logo and under a different tagline: "You know the name. You know the number". This time, the film's logo was introduced, using the MatrixWide typeface (earlier versions of this logo used a modified FrizQuadrata typography). The theatrical artwork had two variations: both retained the same black background and action scenes collage surrounding the three principals (Pierce Brosnan, Izabella Scorupco and Famke Janssen), but the International poster had James Bond in tuxedo while in the American version only had the secret agent's face emerging from the shadows. The American variant was used for the cover artwork of the film's soundtrack and the box of the Nintendo 64 video game adaptation released in 1997. On a 2015 interview regarding his take on the GoldenEye poster campaign, photographer John Stoddart (who previously worked with Brosnan for a Brioni photoshoot) said his only directive was "Bond, girls and guns"

In July 1995, a teaser trailer for GoldenEye was attached to prints of Roger Donaldson's film Species after its debut on the syndicated American television program Extra, followed by a more generic theatrical trailer which revealed Bond's confrontation with agent 006. Asked about the inclusion of this spoiler in a 2019 interview, former MGM/UA Vice-president Jeff Kleeman pointed out that he felt "the idea of 006 vs 007 was a selling point". Both trailers were directed by Joe Nimziki.

=== Music ===
The theme song, "GoldenEye", was written by Bono and the Edge, and was performed by Tina Turner. As the producers did not collaborate with Bono or the Edge, the film score did not incorporate any of the theme song's melodies, as was the case in previous James Bond films. Swedish group Ace of Base had also written a proposed theme song, but label Arista Records pulled the band out of the project, fearing the negative impact in case the film flopped. The song was then rewritten as their single "The Juvenile".

The soundtrack was composed and performed by Éric Serra. Prolific Bond composer John Barry said that, despite an offer by Barbara Broccoli, he turned it down. Serra's score has been criticised: Richard von Busack, in Metro, wrote that it was "more appropriate for a ride on an elevator than a ride on a roller coaster", and Filmtracks said Serra "failed completely in his attempt to tie GoldenEye to the franchise's past."

Martin Campbell would also later express his disappointment with the score, citing budget constraints and difficulty working with Serra, who became uncooperative when asked to re-score the St. Petersburg tank chase after Campbell rejected his submitted track. John Altman would later provide the music for the sequence, while Serra's original track can still be found on the soundtrack as "A Pleasant Drive in St. Petersburg".

Serra composed and performed a number of synthesiser tracks, including the version of the "James Bond Theme" that plays during the gun barrel sequence, while Altman and David Arch provided the more traditional symphonic music. Serra sings the end credits song "The Experience of Love".

== Release ==
GoldenEye premiered on 13 November 1995, at the Radio City Music Hall, and went on general release in the United States on 17 November 1995. The UK premiere followed on 21 November at the Odeon Leicester Square, with general release three days later. The film also had its German premiere on 5 December, at which Brosnan was present, at Mathäser-Filmpalast (de) in Munich, with general release on 28 December; and the Swedish premiere on 8 December, attended by Brosnan and Scorupco, at Rigoletto (sv) in Stockholm, with general release on the same day. The after-party took place at Stockholm's Grand Hôtel. Brosnan boycotted the French premiere to support Greenpeace's protest against the French nuclear testing program.

The film earned over $26 million during its opening across 2,667 cinemas in the United States and Canada. In the United Kingdom, it grossed a record $5.5 million for a non-holiday week from 448 theatres and was the third biggest in history, behind Jurassic Park and Batman Forever. It had the fourth-highest worldwide gross of all films in 1995, and was the most successful Bond film since Moonraker, taking inflation into account.

The film was edited to be guaranteed a PG-13 rating from the Motion Picture Association of America (MPAA) and a 12 rating from the British Board of Film Classification (BBFC). The cuts included the visible bullet impact to Trevelyan's head when he is shot in the prologue, several additional deaths during the sequence in which Onatopp guns down the workers at the Severnaya station, more explicit footage and violent behaviour in the Admiral's death, extra footage of Onatopp's death, and Bond knocking her out with a rabbit punch in the car. In 2006, the film was remastered for the James Bond Ultimate Edition DVD in which the BBFC cuts were restored, causing the rating to be changed to 15. However, the original MPAA edits still remain.

== Reception ==
=== Initial critical response ===
The critical reception of the film was mostly positive. In the Chicago Sun-Times, Roger Ebert gave the film 3 stars out of 4, and said Brosnan's Bond was "somehow more sensitive, more vulnerable, more psychologically complete" than the previous ones, also commenting on Bond's "loss of innocence" since previous films. James Berardinelli described Brosnan as "a decided improvement over his immediate predecessor" with a "flair for wit to go along with his natural charm", but added that "fully one-quarter of GoldenEye is momentum-killing padding."

Several reviewers lauded M's appraisal of Bond as a "sexist, misogynist dinosaur", with Todd McCarthy in Variety saying the film "breathes fresh creative and commercial life" into the series. John Puccio of DVD Town said that it was "an eye- and ear-pleasing, action-packed entry in the Bond series" and that the film gave Bond "a bit of humanity, too". Ian Nathan of Empire said that it "revamps that indomitable British spirit" and that the Die Hard movies "don't even come close to 007". Tom Sonne of The Sunday Times considered it the best Bond film since The Spy Who Loved Me. Jose Arroyo of Sight & Sound considered the greatest success of it was in modernising the series.

However, the film received several negative reviews. Richard Schickel of Time wrote that after "a third of a century's hard use", Bond's conventions survived on "wobbly knees", while in Entertainment Weekly, Owen Gleiberman thought the series had "entered a near-terminal state of exhaustion." Kenneth Turan of the Los Angeles Times said that it was "a middle-aged entity anxious to appear trendy at all costs". David Eimer of Premiere wrote that "the trademark humour is in short supply" and that "Goldeneye isn't classic Bond by any stretch of the imagination."

=== Retrospective reviews ===
Film review aggregator website Rotten Tomatoes holds it at an 81% approval rating, based on 88 reviews. The website's critics consensus states: "The first and best Pierce Brosnan Bond film, GoldenEye brings the series into a more modern context, and the result is a 007 entry that's high-tech, action-packed, and urbane." On Metacritic, the film has a weighted average score of 65 out of 100, based on 19 critics, indicating "generally favorable" reviews. Audiences polled by CinemaScore gave the film an average grade of "A−" on an A+ to F scale.

Often ranked as Brosnan's best Bond film and one of the best films in the entire series, GoldenEye's reputation has further improved since its release. It is ranked high on Bond-related lists; IGN chose it as the fifth-best movie, while Entertainment Weekly ranked it eighth, and Norman Wilner of MSN as ninth. EW also voted Xenia Onatopp as the sixth-most memorable Bond girl, while IGN ranked Natalya as seventh in a similar list. The film enjoys a large and enthusiastic following among Bond fans, especially those who grew up with the GoldenEye 007 video game. In a 2021 Yahoo survey consisting of 2,200 scholars and Bond superfans, GoldenEye was voted as the best Bond film, followed by Daniel Craig's Casino Royale and George Lazenby's On Her Majesty's Secret Service.

In 2025, The Hollywood Reporter listed GoldenEye as having the best stunts of 1995.

=== Awards and nominations ===
The film was nominated for two BAFTAs—Best Sound and Special Visual Effects—in 1996, but lost to Braveheart and Apollo 13, respectively.

Éric Serra won a BMI Film Award for the soundtrack, and it also earned nominations for Best Action, Adventure or Thriller Film and Actor at the 22nd Saturn Awards, and Best Fight and Best Sandwich in a Movie at the 1996 MTV Movie Awards.

== Appearances in other media ==
GoldenEye was the second and final Bond film to be adapted to a novel by novelist John Gardner. The book closely follows its storyline, but Gardner added a violent sequence prior to the opening bungee jump in which Bond kills a group of Russian guards, a change that would be retained and expanded upon in the video game GoldenEye 007.

In late 1995, Topps Comics began publishing a three-issue comic book adaptation of the film. The script was adapted by Don McGregor with art by Rick Magyar. The first issue carried a January 1996 cover date. For unknown reasons, Topps cancelled the entire adaptation after the first issue had been published, and to date the adaptation has not been released in its entirety.

Also in 1995, Tiger Electronics released a third-person shooter handheld electronic game in two different variants: a gamepad variant, with a liquid-crystal display (LCD), a cross-shaped push button and two line-shaped ones and four settings buttons on the lower side of the screen, and a "Grip Games" line variant, shaped like a pistol grip, with a trigger used to shoot and other buttons on the rear. The two editions were slightly different.

The film was the basis for GoldenEye 007, a video game for the Nintendo 64 developed by Rare and published by Nintendo. It was praised by critics and in January 2000, readers of the British video game magazine Computer and Video Games listed it in first place in a list of "the hundred greatest video games". In 2003, Edge's included it as one of their top ten shooter games of all time. It is based upon the film, but many of the missions were extended or modified.

A version of Goldeneye was developed as a racing game intended to be released for the Virtual Boy console. However, it was cancelled before release. In 2004, Electronic Arts released GoldenEye: Rogue Agent, the first game of the James Bond series in which the player does not take on the role of Bond. Instead, the protagonist is an aspiring Double-0 agent Jonathan Hunter, known by his codename "GoldenEye", recruited by a villain of the Bond universe, Auric Goldfinger. Except for the appearance of Xenia Onatopp, it was unrelated to the film, and was released to mediocre reviews. It was excoriated by several critics including Eric Qualls for using the name "GoldenEye" as an attempt to ride on the success of Rare's game. In 2010, an independent development team released GoldenEye: Source, a multiplayer only total conversion mod developed using Valve's Source engine.

Nintendo announced a remake of the original GoldenEye 007 at their E3 press conference on 15 June 2010. It is a modernised retelling of the original movie's story, with Daniel Craig playing the role of Bond. Bruce Feirstein returned to write a modernised version of the script, while Nicole Scherzinger covered the theme song. It was developed by Eurocom and published by Activision for the Wii and Nintendo DS and was released in November 2010. Both the DS and Wii versions bear little to no resemblance to the locations and weapons of the original N64 release. In 2011, the game was ported to PlayStation 3 and Xbox 360 under the name GoldenEye 007: Reloaded.

== See also ==
- Counter-electronics High Power Microwave Advanced Missile Project (CHAMP)
- Outline of James Bond
- Repatriation of Cossacks after World War II

== Bibliography ==
- Field, Matthew; Chowdhury, Ajay (2015). Some Kind of Hero: The Remarkable Story of the James Bond Films. The History Press. ISBN 978-0-7509-6421-0. OCLC 930556527.
