= GoldenEye 007 (2010 video game) =

2010 video game

- Developers: Eurocom n-Space (DS)
- Publisher: Activision: JP: Nintendo (Wii)
- Writer: Bruce Feirstein
- Composers: David Arnold; Kevin Kiner
- Series: James Bond
- Engine: EngineX; EngineXT (Reloaded)
- Platforms: Wii; Nintendo DS; PlayStation 3 Xbox 360
- Release: Original: NA: 2 November 2010; AU: 3 November 2010; EU: 5 November 2010; JP: 30 June 2011; Reloaded: NA: 1 November 2011; EU: 4 November 2011; AU: 25 November 2011
- Genre: First-person shooter
- Modes: Single-player, multiplayer

GoldenEye 007 is a 2010 first-person shooter video game developed by Eurocom and published by Activision for the Wii, with a handheld version for Nintendo DS developed by n-Space. It is a modern reimagining of the 1995 James Bond film GoldenEye as well as a remake of the 1997 Nintendo 64 game of the same name. The game was officially announced by Nintendo at their E3 2010 conference presentation. It was released in November 2010 in tandem with another James Bond game, Blood Stone. It was the fifth James Bond game developed by Eurocom and their second under Activision.

Although not as critically acclaimed as its original Nintendo 64 version, the game received positive reviews from critics, with many calling it a return to form for the series, with particular praise for its gameplay, campaign, voice acting, multiplayer and controls. An enhanced port of the game, titled GoldenEye 007: Reloaded, was released in November 2011 for Xbox 360 and PlayStation 3.

== Synopsis ==
=== Setting ===
Although Pierce Brosnan starred as James Bond in GoldenEye and was featured in the 1997 game, subsequent Bond actor Daniel Craig's likeness and voice are featured in the 2010 game. The plot has been modified to match the style of the first two Craig reboot era films, which also meant the exclusion of Q and Miss Moneypenny (who later returned to the franchise in Skyfall). Judi Dench (who portrayed M since the original GoldenEye) reprises her role in voice only, as does Rory Kinnear as Bill Tanner. With the exception of M, all other main characters from the film have had their appearances and voices altered while retaining their original names. Unlike the original video game and movie, the whole story takes place after the Cold War due to the fall of the Soviet Union. Accordingly, the story does not jump nine years ahead after the opening sequence as it does in the film.

=== Plot ===
Set in between Quantum of Solace and Skyfall, MI6 Agents James Bond and Alec Trevelyan are tasked by M with infiltrating a chemical weapons facility in Arkhangelsk, Russia, which is believed to be the source of weapons used by a terrorist cell to target British embassies around the globe. The mission goes awry when Trevelyan is captured and shot by General Ourumov. Bond escapes by detonating explosives he had placed throughout the facility before fleeing Arkhangelsk via an aeroplane.

Later, a phone call intercepted from Ourumov connects him to Russian gangster Valentin Zukovsky as Ourumov attempts to acquire a helicopter that has been modified to survive an electromagnetic pulse. Bond convenes with Zukovsky at his nightclub, where Zukovsky reluctantly directs him to an arms fair in Dubai before he is killed by Xenia Onatopp, an operative for Ourumov posing as a waitress. Bond is able to escape Zukovsky's armed guards and eventually reach the arms fair. Onatopp and Ourumov hijack the helicopter but Bond is able to plant his smartphone on board, and MI6 is able to track the helicopter to a remote base in Siberia. Bond is unable to thwart the theft of a GoldenEye weapons satellite, which is detonated by Ourumov. Bond rescues computer programmer Natalya Simonova, but both are arrested by the Russian army.

Believing Bond and Natalya to be responsible for the GoldenEye blast, Russian Defence Minister Dmitri Mishkin interrogates the two in Saint Petersburg. Mishkin is killed by Ourumov, who then abducts Natalya. Bond commandeers a tank, pursues him to a train, and confronts him over his plan for the GoldenEye satellite, but Onatopp betrays Ourumov and kills him. Bond is able to help Natalya off the train and goes to a meeting at Statue Park, learning that Trevelyan survived his execution at the hands of Ourumov and is now Janus, the mastermind behind the GoldenEye theft. Trevelyan leaves with Natalya, who is instrumental in his plan, while Bond narrowly escapes the helicopter as it fires missiles on itself.

Bond traverses a jungle in northwestern Nigeria in order to infiltrate Trevelyan's solar panel facility, killing Onatopp en route. Bond plants bombs on various engines before being captured and brought to Trevelyan. Trevelyan attempts to use Natalya's fingerprints to activate the GoldenEye key to use the satellite to rob London's banks and destroy its financial records, but Bond dupes him into sabotaging the solar panels vital to the GoldenEye. After Bond and Natalya sabotage the satellite, Bond pursues Trevelyan before eventually overloading the facility control room and shooting Trevelyan, sending him to his death over the tower. Natalya and Bond escape the base by helicopter, with the couple kissing in the mission's aftermath.

== Gameplay ==
GoldenEye 007 features re-imagined areas from the film.

While GoldenEye 007 is a re-imagining of the film, the game does have noticeable differences. Levels have been altered to reflect the game's modified story. According to Craig Harris of IGN, "GoldenEye still retains the basics of GoldenEye's story, but retells it in a way that makes sense with Daniel Craig's interpretation of James Bond." Likewise, the game features modern game elements to coincide with other modern first-person shooters, such as destructible environments, regenerating health, and online multiplayer.

Eurocom has added a few updated features while retaining some features from the original game. Instead of a watch, players use a mobile phone to scan documents, take photos, and communicate with MI6. This change was reflective of the initial departure of high end gadgets for the Craig films. The original GoldenEye 007 featured a cheat menu which is available from the start in the re-make. The game updates the AI-Bot system which is built upon Eurocom's previous game, Dead Space: Extraction. Each computer player possesses its own AI-bot system to make them dynamic and challenging.

The game offers players several choices of controllers: Wii Remote with Nunchuk, Wii Zapper, Classic Controller, Classic Controller Pro, or a Nintendo GameCube controller. GoldenEye 007 also provides players using the Remote with Nunchuk or Wii Zapper with the ability to peer around cover by tilting the Nunchuk. The game includes twenty-five weapons based upon counterparts from the franchise overall. The game does not open with any gun barrel sequence like the Craig films prior to the release of Spectre which was the first 007 film to open with it since Die Another Day.

=== Multiplayer ===
GoldenEye 007 features both offline split-screen for up to four local players and online play for up to eight players. There are 10 multiplayer maps. There are four different game modes for offline multiplayer and nine different game modes for online multiplayer. Online multiplayer is provided through the free Nintendo Wi-Fi Connection, and though up to eight players can connect to a game remotely, only one local player is allowed at a time. Multiplayer includes characters from the single-player campaign, such as James Bond and Alec Trevelyan, as well as classic Bond-series characters including Jaws, Oddjob, and Julius No. Additionally, online multiplayer offers XP progression, unlockables and multipliers.

Split-screen combat provides over a dozen modifiers, including Melee Only, You Only Live Twice, and Paintball Mode from the original game.

== Development ==
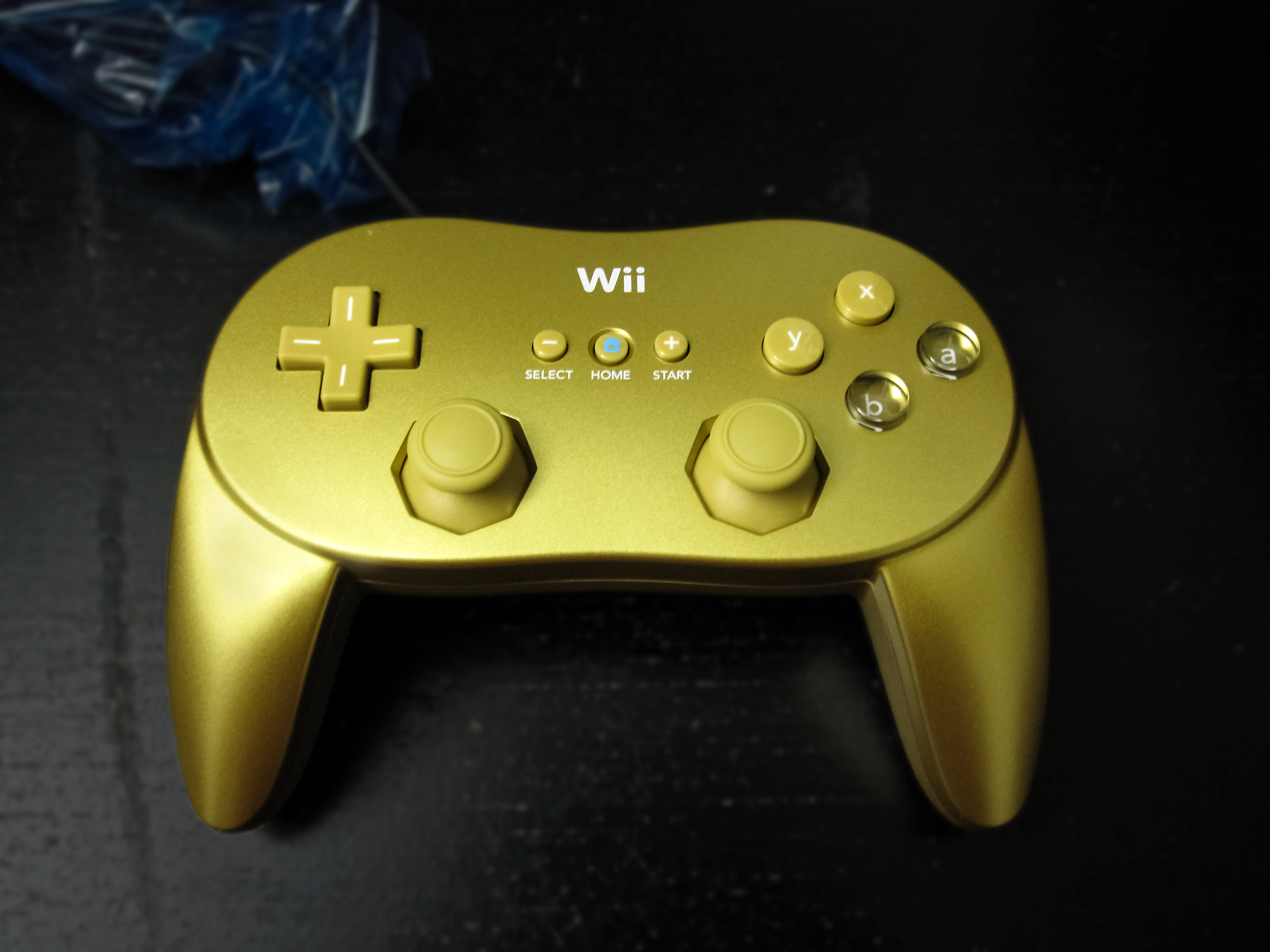
The Classic Edition is bundled with a limited edition gold-coloured Classic Controller Pro.

In November 2006, Nintendo of America president Reggie Fils-Aimé announced that Nintendo was exploring the possibility of adding the Nintendo 64 video game GoldenEye 007 to the Virtual Console, despite a complicated situation in which the game's developer Rare is owned by Microsoft (producers of the rival Xbox 360 console) and the video game rights to the James Bond franchise are held by Activision. He stated, "We would love to see it [on the Virtual Console], so we're exploring all the rights issues." On 7 January 2008, Xbox Evolved reported that an updated version of GoldenEye 007 would be released on Xbox Live Arcade. However, on 11 January 2008, 1UP.com reported that a GoldenEye 007 port (as opposed to a remake) had been in development at Rare for several months, but stated that the title would not be released on the Xbox Live Arcade since "Microsoft and Nintendo couldn't agree on the financial side of things". However, Perfect Dark, a Nintendo 64 title which used the same engine as GoldenEye, would later make it to Xbox Live Arcade, and the near-complete port of Goldeneye 007 was leaked online in 2021. It was revealed at E3 2010 that a new Goldeneye video game would be released for the Wii in November 2010. GoldenEye 007 is built on a modified version of the IW game engine from another Wii game by Eurocom, Dead Space: Extraction.

Originally, Free Radical Design were approached by Activision to develop the game because former Rare staff were working there, with the PlayStation 3 and Xbox 360 initially being considered as target platforms early into development. Free Radical Design even rebuilt the first level, "Dam" for those consoles. However, negotiations fell through and Activision instead went for Eurocom, with Free Radical entering Administration soon afterwards, and Activision then shelved PlayStation 3 and Xbox 360 releases to target Nintendo platforms exclusively on initial release. The non-Nintendo console versions were released a year later as enhanced ports, subtitled Reloaded.

James Bond film producer Michael G. Wilson spoke in June 2010 about Daniel Craig's participation in revisiting the story from the original film. "When we first pitched the game to him, he was really excited about it. He thought the original game was great. Daniel plays a lot of games and... gives us a lot of good criticism. We'll show him what the plan is and he'll suggest changes and get very hands-on." Wilson went on to say that Craig is aware of the original game's impact, but that his on-screen interpretation of James Bond also required changes to the tone of the story and an increased physical nature to the gameplay.

Eurocom hired motion graphics director Alex Donne Johnson (founder of DAZZLE SHIP) to collaborate with Carlos Villareal Kwasek to create the intro title sequence and cut scenes for the game.

David Arnold, composer of the 007 film scores from Tomorrow Never Dies until Quantum of Solace, composed the game's score. Nicole Scherzinger performs the title song "GoldenEye", a cover version of the film's theme which was originally performed by Tina Turner. The game's script is penned by Bruce Feirstein, the co-writer of the GoldenEye film, who has described several changes made to update the story in the fifteen years since its release; for example, Alec Trevelyan's motivations have changed, as the character's backstory involving a Lienz Cossack father would make Trevelyan seventy-one years old in 2010, while Valentin Zukovsky no longer has any connection to the KGB. Feirstein also cited a sequence of the game set at a Dubai arms fair. Rory Kinnear reprises his role from Quantum of Solace as Bill Tanner, M's Chief of Staff.

== Release ==
GoldenEye 007 was released in North America on 2 November 2010 and in Europe on 5 November 2010.

GoldenEye 007: Reloaded was released in North America on 1 November 2011. It was released in South Korea on December 9, 2011.

== Reception ==
Reception

Aggregate scores
Aggregator	Score
GameRankings	(Wii) 83.67% (NDS) 68.82%
Metacritic	(Wii) 81/100 (NDS) 64/100

Review scores
Publication	Score
1Up.com	B+
Famitsu	9/10, 8/10, 9/10, 8/10 (Wii); 22/40 (NDS)
Game Informer	6.5/10
GameSpot	8.5/10
GamesRadar+	7/10
GameTrailers	8.6/10
IGN	9.0/10
Joystiq	4/5
Nintendo World Report	8.5/10
Official Nintendo Magazine	90%
Digital Trends	8/10

GoldenEye 007 received positive reviews. Aggregating review websites GameRankings and Metacritic gave the Wii version 83.67% and 81/100 and the Nintendo DS version 68.82% and 64/100.

IGN gave the game their Editor's Choice Award, praising its multiplayer component and its well-crafted story while criticising the lack of voice chat. The reviewer, Craig Harris, concluded by acknowledging that the game—as of its release—is the Wii's best first person shooter. GameSpot reviewer Tom McShea also praised the game, awarding it an 8.5 out of 10. Joystiq scored the game 4 out of 5.

Nintendo World Report awarded the game an 8.5/10, with the reviewer stating, "Frankly, I haven't seen a more impressive Wii shooter." The Official Nintendo Magazine gave GoldenEye 007 a score of 90%. GameTrailers scored the game at 8.6 of 10, indicating that while most aspects are well-done, the game's performance suffers from inconsistent framerates, particularly during split-screen play. They also derided the menus as "bland" and the "not very crisp" overall picture due to aliasing. Digital Trends' gave the game 8 of 10, complaining of the enemy AI's simplistic strategies and lack of adaptability. While the multiplayer gameplay was highly praised by the reviewer, the lack of voice chat was seen as a significant omission.

GamesRadar, although less positive, were still pleased with the result, awarding the game a 7 out of 10, stating that it was impossible for the game to live up to the original, but that it was still "a damn fine, 'serious' shooter on the Wii, and that's saying something," adding that "even without the limited options for mature action for Wii owners, GoldenEye 007 is a solid game in its own right." In contrast, Game Informer was less impressed, giving the game a 6.5/10, calling it "a lackluster game that fails to hit the same high notes of the original, or keep pace with modern shooters".

== GoldenEye 007: Reloaded ==
At the 2011 San Diego Comic-Con, Activision unveiled GoldenEye 007: Reloaded, a remastering of the Wii game for the Xbox 360 and PlayStation 3 consoles. The game features high-definition graphics due to running on a new game engine, an achievement system, new "MI6 Ops Missions", and PlayStation Move compatibility for the PlayStation 3 version. The game was released on 1 November 2011 in North America, and on 4 November 2011 in Europe. Activision also released a PlayStation 3 bundle called "GoldenEye 007: Reloaded – Double 'O' Edition"; the bundle features the game itself, the PlayStation Move motion and navigation controllers, PlayStation Eye Camera, the Sharp Shooter peripheral, and access to the downloadable character Hugo Drax. The bundle was released along with the standalone game.

=== Reception ===
Reception

Aggregate scores
Aggregator	Score
GameRankings	(PS3) 75.60% (X360) 73.20%
Metacritic	(PS3) 72/100 (X360) 72/100

GoldenEye 007: Reloaded received generally mixed reviews. Aggregating review websites GameRankings and Metacritic gave the PlayStation 3 version 75.60% and 72/100 and the Xbox 360 version 73.20% and 72/100.
