= Goldeneye (disambiguation) =

GoldenEye is a 1995 James Bond film starring Pierce Brosnan, written by Michael France.

Goldeneye, GoldenEye, or Golden Eye(s) may also refer to:

== Arts and entertainment ==
=== Film ===
- Goldeneye (1989 film), a TV film starring Charles Dance as Ian Fleming
- The Golden Eye, a 1948 mystery film starring Roland Winters as Charlie Chan

=== Games ===
- GoldenEye (1995 video game), a Tiger Electronics handheld game
- GoldenEye 007, a video game released for the Nintendo 64
  - GoldenEye: Source, a total conversion mod of the 1997 video game
- GoldenEye: Rogue Agent, a video game released for PlayStation 2, Xbox and Nintendo GameCube in 2004 and Nintendo DS in 2005
- GoldenEye 007 (2010 video game), a video game released for Wii and Nintendo DS in 2010
  - GoldenEye 007: Reloaded, an HD remaster of the 2010 game released for PlayStation 3 and Xbox 360 in 2011
- GoldenEye (pinball), a pinball machine produced by Sega in 1996
- GoldenEye 007, a cancelled Virtual Boy video game

=== Music ===
- GoldenEye (soundtrack), of the 1995 film
  - "GoldenEye" (song), a song performed by Tina Turner for the 1995 film
- Golden Eye (album), a 1997 album by Christina Aguilar
- "The Juvenile", a 2002 song written by Jonas "Joker" Berggren from Ace of Base, renamed from "GoldenEye" after the song was cut from the film's soundtrack

=== Television ===
- The Golden Eyes, 2019 Chinese TV show

== Biology ==
=== Animals ===
- Goldeneye (duck) (Bucephala), a genus of duck
  - Common goldeneye (Bucephala clangula), a species

=== Plants ===
- Viguiera, or goldeneye, a genus of flowering plants in the family Asteraceae
- Heliomeris, or false goldeneye, a genus of flowering plants in the family Asteraceae

=== Other uses in biology ===
- Golden or amber-coloured eyes, an eye color

== Places ==
- Golden Eye Cluster, a star cluster in the Milky Way Galaxy
- Goldeneye (estate), Ian Fleming's Jamaican estate, now the Goldeneye Hotel and Resort
- Goldeneye Gas Platform, a former gas production platform

== Other uses ==
- Aurora Goldeneye, a reconnaissance UAV
- Golden Eye (design award), a design award at the Dutch Design Awards
- Golden Eye (film award), film awards at the Zurich Film Festival
- Golden Eye Diamond, a 43.5-carat (8.70 g) Canary Yellow diamond
- Herreshoff Goldeneye, an American sailboat design
- Operation Goldeneye, a World War II plan developed by James Bond author Ian Fleming
- Vancouver Goldeneyes, a women's hockey team

== See also ==
- Goldeye (disambiguation)
- Golden (disambiguation)
- Eye (disambiguation)
- Reflections in a Golden Eye (disambiguation)
