= I (disambiguation) =

I is the ninth letter of the Latin alphabet.

I or i may also refer to:

== Language ==
- I (pronoun), the first-person singular subject pronoun in English
- ı, dotless I (lowercase), Latin letter used in Turkish and Azerbaijani
- İ (uppercase), dotted I, used in the Latin-script alphabets of Azerbaijani, Crimean Tatar, Gagauz, Kazakh, Tatar, and Turkish
- I (Cyrillic) (И и), a letter used in almost all ancient and modern Cyrillic alphabets
- Dotted I (Cyrillic) (І і), used in the orthographies of Belarusian (in replacement of Cyrillic И), Kazakh, Khakas, Komi, Carpathian Rusyn and Ukrainian
- Iota, the letter in the Greek alphabet, uppercase Ι, lowercase ι
- I (hangul)
- I (kana), one of the Japanese kana that each represent one mora
- I, male prefix to some Balinese names
- In the International Phonetic Alphabet:
  - i, close front unrounded vowel
  - ɨ, close central unrounded vowel
  - ɪ, near-close near-front unrounded vowel

== Science, technology, and mathematics ==
=== Biology ===
- Troponin I, one of the three troponins
- Haplogroup I (mtDNA), a human mitochondrial DNA (mtDNA) haplogroup
- Haplogroup I (Y-DNA), a Y-chromosomal DNA (Y-DNA) haplogroup
- Olfactory nerve, the 1st cranial nerve in human anatomy
- The Lợn Ỉ or Vietnamese Pot-bellied pig

=== Chemistry ===
- Iodine, symbol I, a chemical element
- I, isoleucine, an amino acid
- I, ionic strength in a chemical solution
- i, Van 't Hoff factor

=== Computing ===
- i, a common generic index variable often used in program loops
- <i>, an HTML element for marking italic type
- .i, the common filename extension for a file that contains the output from a preprocessor
- i-, a prefix for Apple products and services e.g. iMac, iPod, iPhone, iCloud
- i-, an Internet-related prefix used by Internet and electronic companies
- Palochka, the number 1 on Cyrillic keyboards that uses the glyph I as its typeset form

=== Mathematics ===
- I, the Roman numeral for 1
- i, imaginary unit, for which i^{2} = −1
- I or I_{n}, identity matrix of indeterminate size (or of size n)
- I, unit interval, which contains all real numbers from 0 to 1 inclusive
- i, an index variable, e. g. in a matrix or for summation
- I_{x}(a,b), the regularized incomplete beta function (of a variable x and parameters a,b)
- î, the unit vector along the x-axis in Cartesian coordinates

=== Physics and astronomy ===
- I, i, electric current
- I, isospin
- I, luminous intensity
- I, moment of inertia
- i, orbital inclination
- I (Roman number one), in the Yerkes spectral classification scheme, the symbol for supergiants

=== Telecommunication ===
- I band (NATO), the range of radio frequencies from 8 GHz to 10 GHz in the electromagnetic spectrum
- I, the ITU prefix allocated to Italy in radio communication
- I, in QAM modulation schemes, the in-phase communications channel
- Chih-Lin I, Chinese telecommunications engineer

=== Other uses in technology ===
- i, a suffix unit for video resolution (vertical Interlaced lines), as in 480i or 1080i
- I, in the YIQ colorspace commonly used with the NTSC television encoding scheme, the color-difference channel which is in-phase with the subcarrier

== Arts and media ==
=== Music ===
==== Albums ====
- i (A.R. Kane album), 1989
- I (Ben Lester album), 2019
- I (Cilvaringz album), 2007
- I (Cursed album), 2003
- I (Die Krupps album), 1992
- I (Felix Jaehn album), 2018
- I (Ikimono-gakari album), 2013
- I (Imminence album), 2014
- I (Jaejoong EP), 2013
- I (Juju album), 2018
- I (Kingston Wall album), 1992
- I (Kurt Nilsen album), 2003
- i (The Magnetic Fields album), 2004
- I (Meshuggah EP), 2004
- i (Misako Odani album), 1997
- I (Nightingale album), 2000
- I (Sahg album), 2006
- I (Taeyeon EP), 2015
- I (Xerath album), 2009
- I (soundtrack), by A. R. Rahman from the eponymous 2015 film
- I., a 2012 EP by Cigarettes After Sex

==== Songs ====
- "I" (Kendrick Lamar song), 2014
- "I" (Kiss song), 1981
- "I" (Lil Skies song), 2019
- "I" (Taproot song), 2001
- "I" (Taeyeon song), 2015
- "I (Who Have Nothing)", a 1966 Ben. E. King song also recorded by Tom Jones, who used the title for one of his albums
- "I", 2008, on In the Shadow of a Thousand Suns, an album by Abigail Williams
- "I", 2003, on Weather Systems, an album by Andrew Bird
- "I", 1992, on Selected Ambient Works 85–92, an album by Aphex Twin
- "I", 1992, on Dehumanizer, an album by Black Sabbath
- "I", 1997, on Coal Chamber, an album by Coal Chamber
- "I", 1967, on Underground, an album by The Electric Prunes
- "I", 2012, on Muse, an album by Jolin Tsai
- "I", 1981, on Music from "The Elder", an album by Kiss
- "I", 2011, on Cinderella's Eyes, an album by Nicola Roberts
- "I", 1994, on Made in USA, an album by Pizzicato Five
- "I", 1999, on Eternal, an album by Samael
- "I", 2003, on Winter Story, an album by Shinhwa
- "I", 2013, on Winterborn, an album by Wolfheart
- "I", 2019, by Hey! Say! JUMP
- "I", 2016, by Rezz

==== Other uses in music ====
- I (band), a Norwegian heavy metal band
- I, a diatonic function in tonal music theory

=== Television and radio ===
- Channel i (Singaporean TV channel), a defunct Singaporean television channel
- i (TV network), the former name of ION Television
- Radio i, originally Radio International, the former name of New Zealand radio station Mix (radio station)
- Radio-i, the brand name of Aichi International Broadcasting, a defunct radio station in Aichi Prefecture, Japan
- TVRi, a Romanian television channel

=== Other media ===
- I (2015 film), an Indian Tamil-language film
- I (2016 film), an Iranian film
- The i Paper, a British newspaper, formerly known as i
- i (Portuguese newspaper), based in Lisbon
- I, a character in the comic book series Adventure into Fear
- "I" Is for Innocent, the ninth novel in Sue Grafton's "Alphabet mystery" series, published in 1992
- I, a Man, a 1967 Andy Warhol film

== Mythology ==
- Goddess I, a Mayan deity
- Hou-i, or I, a heroic archer and hunter in Chinese mythology

== Vehicles and transportation ==
- Italy (I), in the list of international vehicle registration codes
- Italy (aircraft registration prefix)
- Mitsubishi i, a Japanese kei car
- I (Los Angeles Railway), a former streetcar line in Los Angeles
- Toei Mita Line, a subway service operated by the Tokyo Metropolitan Bureau of Transportation (Toei), labeled
- Imazatosuji Line, a subway service operated by the Osaka Metro, labeled
- , the official West Japan Railway Company service symbol for the Kakogawa Line

== Other uses ==
- i, an international symbol for visitor or tourist information; see ISO 7001
- Nintendo DSi, the third model in the Nintendo DS line, released in 2008
- Nintendo DSi XL, the larger version of the DSi, released in 2009
- I, an alternative romanization of Lee (Korean surname)
- I-Foundation, a charity in charge of state-funded Hindu faith schools in the UK
- Interest rate (i), in economics
- India, the military time zone code for UTC+09:00
- I Ching, or Yijing, ancient Chinese text

== See also ==
- ⓘ
- 1 (disambiguation)
- l (disambiguation)
- Eye (disambiguation)
- Self
