= Aye =

Aye or AYE may refer to:

- Aye (yes), an English affirmative

== Businesses and organisations ==
- Africa's Young Entrepreneurs, a non-profit organisation in Johannesburg, South Africa
- Allegheny Energy (NYSE symbol), an electric utility in Greensburg, Pennsylvania, US

== Music ==
- Aye (album), 2012, by Martyn Bennett, 2012
- "Aye" (Davido song), 2014
- "Aye" (Lil Uzi Vert song), 2023

== Places ==
- Aye (village), a village in Belgium
- Ayer Rajah Expressway (abbreviated AYE), an expressway in Singapore
- Ayé, physical realm in Yoruba cosmology

== People ==
- Saint Aye (died c. 711), Belgian Catholic saint
- Florian Ayé (born 1997), French footballer
- G. Kaito Aye, Indian politician
- Mar Mar Aye (1942–2024), Burmese singer
- Marion Aye (1903–1951), American actress
- Maung Aye (born 1938), Burmese military officer
- Mya Aye (activist) (born 1966), Burmese pro-democracy activist
- Mya Aye (minister) (1942–2013), Burmese educator and government minister
- Mya Aye (golfer) (born 1940), Burmese golfer
- Saya Aye (1872–1930), Burmese artist
- Sithu Aye (born 1990), Scottish-Burmese musician

== See also ==
- AEY (disambiguation)
- Aye-aye, a lemur
- AY (disambiguation)
- Eye (disambiguation)
- Yes (disambiguation)
- Right (disambiguation)
