= Eyeball (disambiguation) =

Eyeball is a term for the entire eye.

Eyeball may also refer to:

- Eyeball (film), 1975 Italian-Spanish film
- Eyeball Records, an American independent record label (1975–2012)
- Eyeball Networks, a Canadian company whose products include Eyeball Chat
- Eyeballs is internet jargon for number of viewers of webpages or sites, see attention economy
- Eyeball (EP), an EP by They Might Be Giants
- Project Eyeball, a defunct Singaporean newspaper

== See also ==
- Eye (disambiguation)
- Eyes (disambiguation)
