= Goldeye (disambiguation) =

The goldeye (Hiodon alosoides) is a freshwater fish found in Canada.

Goldeye, Goldeyes or Gold Eye may also refer to:

- Gold-eye lichen (Teloschistes chrysophthalmus)
- Goldeye, Alberta, Canada; a locality in Clearwater County
- Winnipeg Goldeyes, a minor league baseball team from Winnipeg, Manitoba, Canada
- Niklaren Goldeye, a fictional character from Circle of Magic

== See also ==
- Goldeneye (disambiguation)
- Gold (disambiguation)
- Eye (disambiguation)
