= List of cancelled Virtual Boy games =

The Virtual Boy is a 32-bit tabletop video game console developed and designed by Nintendo. The system, released in July 1995 in Japan and August 1995 in North America, had an exceptionally short lifespan due to its poor critical and commercial reception. It was discontinued in December 1995 in Japan, and in August 1996 in North America. With game development generally taking longer than this, many game cancellations resulted from its short lifespan. Some games that were fully completed at the time of cancellation have later seen release through both official and unofficial channels. This list documents games that were confirmed for release for the Virtual Boy at some point, but did not end up being released for it.

== Games ==
There are currently 34 games on this list. (Note: This number is always up to date by this script.)

List of cancelled Virtual Boy games
Title(s)	Notes/Reasons	Developer	Publisher
Bonk series entry (Genjin Show: Tobidase! VB Genjin)	An entry in the Bonk platformer series was internally proposed at Hudson Soft for the Virtual Boy shortly after the completion of Super Bonk (1994). Design documents proposed using the Virtual Boy's 3D visuals to create the effect of viewing the game itself from the point of an audience member looking down and watching a performance on a stage. The game was cancelled and abandoned before it could even be publicly announced due to the poor performance and swift discontinuation of the Virtual Boy hardware.	Hudson Soft	Hudson Soft
Bound High!	A top-down perspective action-puzzle game where the player would maneuver a bouncing ball-like character through levels, bouncing on enemies and avoiding pits, with the Virtual Boy's 3D effect used to show depth. The game was far enough along in development to be present at E3 1996, and was eventually finished, but the Virtual Boy's discontinuation cancelled the game's release. Some of the development team reworked some of the ideas and soundtrack into a Japan-only 2D Game Boy Color game Chalvo 55 (1997). Bound High's source code leaked in 2010, which was eventually unofficially assembled into a playable version of the entire game.	Japan System Supply	Nintendo
Donkey Kong Country 2	Shortly after the successful release of Donkey Kong Country (1994), a small team at Rare was tasked with testing to see what they could do with Donkey Kong on the Virtual Boy hardware. Tests included adding content from Donkey Kong Land (1995), which featured comparable monochrome graphics. The work created a visual that looked like the Donkey Kong Land series with a 3D popping out effect. It was decided to make a version of Donkey Kong Country 2 for the Virtual Boy, which was the Donkey Kong Country game being worked on at the time. Only minimal work was done on the project; while they were happy with how it looked, creating the 3D effect was very labor-intensive, and the idea was abandoned as it was becoming clear that the Virtual Boy appeared to be a commercial failure.	Rare	Nintendo
Doraemon: Nobita no Doki Doki! Obake Land	Translating roughly to Doraemon: Nobita's Pounding Heart! Ghostland, the game was based on the Doraemon franchise. The game consisted of moving the title character through sidescrolling levels of an amusement park. Various minigames, such as one where you road a rollercoaster, demonstrated the Virtual Boy's 3D effects. The game was scheduled for a 1996 release in Japan, but the Virtual Boy was discontinued in December 1995 in Japan, and the game never saw release.	Epoch Co., Ltd.	
Dragon Hopper	An action-adventure game announced in 1995 and present in playable form at E3 1996. Development was completed, with a scheduled release period of late 1996, but the Virtual Boy was discontinued prior, and the game never released or leaked in any capacity for 30 years. The game received its first official release in 2026 via the Nintendo Classics service.	Intelligent Systems	Nintendo
Faceball (Niko-Chan Battle in Japan)	A game where the player controls a ball with face on it from the first person perspective and maneuvers through a maze in attempts. First released on the Atari ST computer line, the game picked up more popularity after being released under the Faceball title on various other platforms. The developers brought the PC game to a variety of Nintendo platforms, such as Game Boy and SNES in the early 1990s, and a version was developed and almost completed for the Virtual Boy, but never saw release, as the platform was discontinued first. A playable Virtual Boy version leaked onto the internet in 2013.	Bullet-Proof Software	Bullet-Proof Software
Galaxian3: Project Dragoon	A 3D rail shooter arcade game released in 1990, versions for the Virtual Boy, 3DO, and the original PlayStation were all reportedly in the works, though only the PlayStation version ever materialized.	Locomotive Corporation	Namco
GoldenEye 007	Upon securing the rights to use the James Bond license in 1995, Nintendo originally planned on developing a companion game to the Nintendo 64 title GoldenEye 007 (1997) on the Virtual Boy. Little is known about the title beyond a small mention in a Nintendo flier given out at events during the platform's lifespan. While the N64 title was a first person shooter, the Virtual Boy game had a completely different premise centered around driving Bond's car, shooting at enemies and avoiding obstacles. Rare, developer of the N64 game, clarified they had no involvement in the Virtual Boy title. The Virtual Boy game was cancelled, and an unrelated companion game James Bond 007 (1998) was published by Nintendo for the Game Boy instead.		Nintendo
Intercept	One of four Virtual Boy game names announced by Coconuts Japan Entertainment at E3 1995. Little is known about the title; publication largely just reported on its name and publisher. None of the titles ever materialized except for Space Squash (1995).	Coconuts Japan Entertainment	Coconuts Japan Entertainment
J-League 3D Stadium	A soccer game announced at Shoshinkai 1995. Little was known about the game beyond the detail that the 3D effect was to create the effect of the soccer ball coming straight at the player's head. The game was scheduled for release in March 1996, but the Virtual Boy was discontinued prior to that and the game never materialized.		J-Wing
Mario Bros. VB	A version of the original Mario Bros. (1983) arcade game was announced alongside the Virtual Boy hardware itself at Shoshinkai 1994. Its demonstration was generally poorly received by video game publications, which lamented the selection of a such an old game to demonstrate the new technology of the Virtual Boy. Mario Bros. VB as demonstrated, never released, though some gameplay concepts were utilized in Mario Clash (1995), a much more creative reimagining of the original Mario Bros.	Nintendo	Nintendo
Mighty Morphin Power Rangers	A video game adaption of the Mighty Morphin Power Rangers franchise was listed on the Virtual Boy release schedule of Nintendo Power magazine for "Winter 1996", though no details were ever revealed, and the game never released.	Bandai	
Out of the Deathmount	A rail shooter involving escaping a dangerous mountain. Was present at Nintendo Space World 1995, but the game never saw release in any capacity.	J-Wing	
Proteus Zone	One of four Virtual Boy game names announced by Coconuts Japan Entertainment at E3 1995. Little is known about the title; publication largely just reported on its name, publisher, and that it was an action/shooter game. None of the announced titles ever materialized except for Space Squash (1995).	Coconuts Japan Entertainment	Coconuts Japan Entertainment
Shin Nihon Pro Wrestling: Gekitō Densetsu	A Japanese wrestling video game announced for the Virtual Boy and present at Nintendo Space World 1995. Was scheduled for release in December 1995, the same month the Virtual Boy was discontinued in Japan, but never materialized.	Tomy	
Sora Tobu Henry ("Flying Henry")	A game where the player controls a flying dog like creature named Henry. Levels were side-scrolling, while boss fights changed a first person perspective with stationary shooting elements. Was present at Nintendo Space World 1995 but never released in any capacity.	Human Entertainment	
Star Fox	Nintendo presented a Star Fox tech demo at CES 1995 and E3 1995, though no such game ever released.	Nintendo	Nintendo
Street Fighter II	GameFan reported on Japanese publications reporting on the prospect of a version of Street Fighter II being developed for the Virtual Boy. Such a title was never announced officially, and is unrelated to unofficial fan efforts to port the game to the platforms after the fact.	Capcom	Capcom
Sunday's Point	One of four Virtual Boy game names announced by Coconuts Japan Entertainment at E3 1995. Little is known about the title; publication largely just reported on its name and publisher, and that it was an action/shooter game. None of the announced titles ever materialized except for Space Squash (1995).	Coconuts Japan Entertainment	Coconuts Japan Entertainment
V1 Racer / F1 Racer	Nintendo presented a F1-styled 3D racing game tech demo at CES 1995 and E3 1995, though no such game ever released.	Nintendo	Nintendo
Virtual Boy Mario Land / VB Mario Land / Untitled Super Mario game	A Super Mario platformer game in the vein of Super Mario World announced and demonstrated at CES 1995. Mostly featured side-scrolling gameplay, but at times switched to a top-down perspective similar to The Legend of Zelda: A Link to the Past. The game was cancelled, with some of its content being reworked into other Virtual Boy titles. Some graphics were implemented into the released Mario Clash (1995), while the gameplay mechanic of having Mario move back and forth between the main and background levels was implemented into Virtual Boy Wario Land.	Nintendo	Nintendo
VB Mario Kart	German magazine Big N reported that Nintendo was developing a Mario Kart entry titled VB Mario Kart in their Virtual Boy future release schedule, though such a game was never officially announced or shown in any capacity, let alone released.	Nintendo	Nintendo
Virtual Block	A game with a premise similar to Breakout. The game was present at Shoshinkai 1995, but never released.	Bottom Up	
Virtual Bomberman	Unlike the released Bomberman puzzle game spinoff Panic Bomber (1995), Virtual Bomberman was planned to have traditional Bomberman gameplay, but due to the discontinuation of the Virtual Boy, it was cancelled and never released.	Hudson Soft	Hudson Soft
Virtual Dodgeball	A 1-on-1 dodgeball game that spanned different environments that would affect gameplay. The game never materialized in any capacity.	Jorudan	Hect
Virtual Mahjong (Virtual Double Yakuman)	After releasing a mahjong game on the Super Famicom in 1993, Japanese developer VAP planned on making a mahjong game for the Virtual Boy as well, though it never materialized in any capacity.	VAP, Inc.	
Virtual Gunman	A shooting game announced in 1995 that never materialized.	Victor Entertainment	
Virtual Jockey	A horse racing game announced in 1995 for the Virtual Boy. The game never released, though developer Right Stuff released a similar horse racing game Jockey Zero (1996) for the original PlayStation the following year.	Right Stuff	Right Stuff
Virtual League Baseball 2	A sequel to the original Virtual League Baseball (1995) was announced and was in development for the Virtual Boy. The game received an ESRB rating, something only given to relatively complete games, but the game was never released in any capacity. In 2025, a ROM of the game was found.	Kemco	Kemco
Virtual Tank	Pitched to Nintendo in early 1995 as a game that played similar to Battlezone (1980) under the working name 3D Tank. The project was greenlit and worked on for months, though progress was slowed as the team had difficulties with the Virtual Boy's brand new hardware, or getting support from Nintendo on it, so parts were developed on PC with intentions on porting it to Virtual Boy. That, coupled with the Virtual Boy's commercial failure and discontinuation, lead to the game's cancellation. The game was not finished, but the developers have a working, playable build of a few levels from the game, which were shown online in 2020, though Nintendo would not authorize its release onto the internet, so only screenshots and videos exist publicly.	Boss Game Studios	Nintendo
Wangan Sensen Red City	A shooting game announced in 1995 that never materialized.	AIM	Asmik Ace
War Simulation	The tentative title of a fifth Virtual Boy title in development by Coconuts Japan Entertainment, in addition to Proteus Zone, Sunday's Point, Intercept, and Space Squash. Of the five titles announced, only Space Squash ever released. Few details were revealed for the other titles beyond their name and developer.	Coconuts Japan Entertainment	Coconuts Japan Entertainment
Worms	A version of the original Worms (1995) was announced for the Virtual Boy, but was cancelled very early in development. Not much was done besides a basic proposal to publisher Ocean Software and some early tests with Virtual Boy hardware.	Team17	Ocean Software
Zero Racers	A spinoff of the F-Zero series of racing games by Nintendo that would have taken place in the same fictional universe and contained similar racing of vehicles, albeit with the change of racing through a more tube shaped race track than a usual flat one. In 2022, a former Nintendo employee verified that the game was entirely finished and ready to be released, even getting an ESRB rating. However, the game was still cancelled due to the commercial failure of the Virtual Boy, and never released in any capacity. The game received its first official release in 2026 via the Nintendo Classics service.	Nintendo	Nintendo
