= Axis Mundi (Imminence album) =

Studio album by Imminence
- Released: 2 October 2026
- Recorded: 2024–2026
- Studios: Gothenburg; Malmö
- Genres: Metalcore; melodic metalcore; symphonic metalcore; shoegaze
- Length: 46:14
- Label: Sumerian
- Producers: Eddie Berg; Harald Barrett; Henrik Udd

Imminence chronology
The Black (2024)	Axis Mundi (2026)

Singles from Axis Mundi
- 1. "The Sword That Never Bends" Released: 11 June 2026; 2. "False Light" Released: 21 July 2026; 3. "Crestfallen" Released: 22 July 2026; 4. "If Not Now, When" Released: 26 August 2026

Axis Mundi is the sixth studio album by Swedish metalcore band Imminence. The album was released on 2 October 2026. It is the band's first release with Sumerian Records, and the first since the departure of drummer Peter Hanström in September 2025. Band members Eddie Berg and Harald Barrett produced the album with Henrik Udd, with co-production from Drew Fulk and Lukas Geppert.

== Background ==
=== Songwriting and recording ===
Writing for the follow up to their fifth studio album, The Black, began immediately after its release in 2024. Berg and Barrett stated in an interview with Kerrang! they were still writing additional material when they began recording the previous album, but had incomplete material when the deadline to record came. Two songs that spawned from this, "Death Shall Have No Dominion" and "God Fearing Man", were included in the deluxe edition, The Return of The Black, but the rest of the material was kept for their next album. The two felt that Axis Mundi is "like a reaction to writing The Black", expressing that they want to "step it up" and "make this album something bigger and greater than whatever we've done before", with Berg stating "It's good to make yourself uncomfortable sometimes" and suggesting the new record wouldn't be as similar to their previous, but "not unfamiliar", and Barrett calling the album a "mature" version of their sound. With most of their previous works being self-produced, Axis Mundi is also their first inclusion of external personnel in their creative process, with Wzrd Bld providing additional production and working with film score producer and composer Lukas Geppert, who the band have said "elevated" their orchestral, classically oriented sound.

The band spoke in another interview about how their writing process has evolved and improved over the years, speaking about writer's block around the time of their 2019 album, Turn the Light On, stating at that time they were "lost", with Barrett saying "We couldn't write, get along or get into having a functional writing session together." and Berg adding that they were "struggling really to find our identity as a band". With Barrett looking to improve their songwriting, they described their new writing process as "judgement-free" with regards to trying something new, sharing the importance of challenging themselves. They felt now that their skill had improved, summarising their writing process in one word, "flow". The band also revealed they had involved a scriptwriter in the writing process to help with writing their narrative, and spoke how their recent signing to Sumerian had allowed them to develop their process further, stating "the possibilities are now endless".

The album was recorded in Gothenburg and self-produced by Berg and Barrett alongside long-time colloborator Henrik Udd near Malmö, and was written alongside a feature length film, later released to promote the album.

=== Promotion and release ===
After Sumerian Records signed Imminence in June 2026, their CEO Ash Avildsen showed his admiration for the band, stating they were "prolific storytellers of emotion" and that he was "honored they have chosen Sumerian for this next era of their career". Subsequently, the band released the single "The Sword That Never Bends" on 11 June. The single was released alongside a music video, whose medieval setting has been compared to that of television series Game of Thrones, depicting two scenes: one of the band in the aftermath of a battlefield, and the other of a knight plundering a village. The video, directed by Pavel Trebukhin, was well received by fans, with some commenting that it felt like the band "are making films with a soundtrack". The band teased that the video was "only the first chapter" and that fans would "see the knight again".

Following teaser trailers depicting swords and more battle scenes released to the band's social media, the next single, "False Light", was released on 21 July, and was also accompanied by a medieval themed video directed by Trebukhin. The video again depicts a knight, this time travelling through a graveyard with grave robbers, to a raided village where he finds a dog.

The following day, 22 July, the band revealed the title for their sixth studio album, Axis Mundi, also sharing its cover art, and announcing the release date of 2 October 2026. Alongside the announcement, the band also released the third single, "Crestfallen", which has been described as softer and more orchestral than the previous two heavier singles. The band spoke about the choice to release two singles together, stating "Duality has always been at the heart of Imminence" and comparing the sonic differences between the singles as "opposing forces", stating "They're radically different in sound and emotion, but together they tell a single story".

On 26 August, the fourth single "If Not Now, When" was released. The single, described as 90s grunge and compared to Deftones, was accompanied by another music video directed by Trebukhin, continuing the narrative of the previous releases, this time depicting the knight travelling with the dog, and sharing a campfire. The knight is described as "immortal" and the nature of his journey is "endlessly in search of the one thing forever beyond his reach: death".

In September 2026, the band announced two pre-listening events to promote the album in Germany ahead of its release, in Berlin and Leipzig on 24 and 25 September respectively. The band also promoted the album ahead of release with a feature length film screened at cinemas in the US on 29 September, and in the UK, Europe, and Australia on 1 October. The film expands upon the knight and dog narrative from the music videos, and screenings were also followed by a 20 minute making-of feature. The film was directed by Trebukhin and written by Juan Felipe Zul.

The physical release of the album includes a track which the band have said will not be released to the digital streaming release.

== Composition ==
In their interview with Kerrang!'s Rishi Shah in July 2026, the band cited inspirations from Swedish culture such as Midsummer, particularly the maypole which is a representation of axis mundi, the axis between the Earth's poles, for which the album was named. The band noted its representation of connections between the Earth and the supernatural, and spoke about the lyrical content of the album, noting themes of finding and living with purpose and "choosing who you want to be in between life and death". Berg described the album as a means to "follow a protagonist through this journey and see how the story develops," stating he didn't yet want to fully reveal the themes of the lyrics as they were personal to him. The band also cited their love for cinema as an inspiration for their desire to tell stories and an origin for their "dramatic" sounding music.

Axis Mundi has been described by critics as metalcore, melodic metalcore, symphonic metalcore, shoegaze, and "violincore", with elements of drum and bass, post-hardcore, and nu-metal, as well as "more traditional metal and metalcore influence creeping into certain tracks".

=== Songs ===
The opening track, "Twisting in the Wind", was described by Berg as a momentum builder and by Barrett as "setting the scene for something different". Critics have described the song as a "theatrical prologue" and "emotional".

The band said they had picked the second track, "The Sword That Never Bends", as the first single from the album immediately after having written it, as a way to show fans a "new side" to their sound, and went on to highlight a contrast to the previous track, noting "two dualities, two very different sides". The track has been described as a "buoyant" track, with critics noting its start for its "nu-groovy bombast and plenty of detuned artillery" compared to Korn, leading into the band's usual melodic style.

"Devil May Try" is one of the heavier tracks on the album, described by Barrett as the closest to their previous album. The fourth track and third single to be released, "Crestfallen", has been compared to Spiritbox, and has been noted for being a more orchestral track.

"False Light", the second single and fifth track is another heavy track, described by Berg as an "onslaught" of heaviness, and has been compared to "Death Shall Have No Dominion" from The Return of the Black. The song has been described as "violent" and "grotesque". The next track and fourth single, "If Not Now When", has been described as '90s alt rock and shoegaze, compared to the sound of Loathe, with Barrett noting their experimentation with the track, calling it "unconventional".

Continuing to experiment with the next track "Didn't Think About You (Lately)", Berg said the track would be "challenging for some listeners" and called it the "darkest [...] and most chaotic and sad" track on the record. Themed around a previous relationship, the track is a more electronic song, making use of vocal effects and being compared to Sleep Token. The track takes inspiration from Bon Iver and Sigur Rós, with less metal influences, instead looking to lo-fi and drum and bass. The eighth track, "Leviathan", has been described as a "slow and brooding" track, likened to an interlude and compared to Holy Hell by Architects.

Discussing the writing process for the ninth track, "Shed Your Skin", Berg recalled asking the question "What if we write a song that's not metal at all?" citing its influence on changing the direction of the band's sound from their previous releases. The track has been noted for grunge, '90s alt rock and post-metal influences, with its different shoegaze sound.

Berg wrote the lyrics for track ten, "Power Divine", a few years before the rest of the record, themed around anxiety. Sonically, the song returns the album to a heavier sound, described as "sinister" and "brutal", Berg noted it was "aggressive in a way that we've never explored before". The track has been compared to works of Robert Eggers for its "chilling" nature.

Comparing the closing track to a movie, Berg stated that "Exodus" "embodies what this album is", with Barrett noting the song as "raw" and "extreme". Described as a powerful ending, the song starts with heavy riffs and harsh vocals, and transitions into a "reflective" orchestral closing, with critics noting on its cinematic ending appropriate for the knight narrative set by the music videos.

== Critical reception ==
Professional ratings
Review scores
Source	Rating
Boolin Tunes	6/10
Distorted Sound	7/10
Kerrang!	4/5
Metal on Tap	9/10
Out of Rage	10/10
Wall of Sound	9/10

Axis Mundi received positive reviews from critics.

Writing for Kerrang! magazine, James Hickie described the album as a "blockbuster", praising the cinematic refinement and contrasting extremes. Georgia Haskins of Wall of Sound praised the experimental nature of the album and the band's use of storytelling, describing it as a "captivating exploration [...] equipped with the instrumental prowess to navigate epics". Ed Walton of Distorted Sound magazine referred to the album as a "tour de force". Danielle Henderson of Out of Rage described the album as the "natural evolution" from the band's previous album, The Black. Metal on Tap's James Locke also praised the band for their storytelling and called the album "immersive world that feels much bigger than the songs individually".

In a more critical review from The Soundboard, Luke Nuttall described the band's use of violin as a "gimmick".

== Track listing ==
All lyrics are written by Eddie Berg; all music is composed by Berg and Harald Barrett.

Axis Mundi track listing
No.	Title	Length
1.	"Twisting in the Wind"	4:13
2.	"The Sword That Never Bends"	3:47
3.	"Devil May Try"	4:11
4.	"Crestfallen"	4:04
5.	"False Light"	3:24
6.	"If Not Now, When"	3:57
7.	"Didn't Think About You (Lately)"	3:48
8.	"Leviathan"	5:07
9.	"Shed Your Skin"	4:53
10.	"Power Divine"	3:54
11.	"Exodus"	4:57
Total length:		46:14

== Personnel ==
Credits are adapted from Tidal.

=== Imminence ===
- Eddie Berg – vocals, violin, viola, production, engineering
- Harald Barrett – guitars, bass guitar, production

=== Additional contributors ===
- Viktor Johannesson – cello
- Joakim Möller – drums
- Adam Janzi – percussion
- Jonathan Sjöberg – piano
- Henrik Udd – production, mixing, engineering, organ
- Lukas Geppert – orchestration, co-production
- Drew Fulk – co-production
- Thomas "Plec" Johansson – mastering

== Charts ==
Chart performance for Axis Mundi
Chart (2026)	Peak position
Australian Albums (ARIA)	27
Austrian Albums (Ö3 Austria)	32
Belgian Albums (Ultratop Wallonia)	167
French Physical Albums (SNEP)	141
French Rock & Metal Albums (SNEP)	25
German Albums (Offizielle Top 100)	12
German Rock & Metal Albums (Offizielle Top 100)	3
Scottish Albums (Official Charts)	38
Swiss Albums (Schweizer Hitparade)	62
UK Album Sales (Official Charts)	20
UK Independent Albums (Official Charts)	9
UK Rock & Metal Albums (Official Charts)	4
US Top Album Sales (Billboard)	39
