= Heaven in Hiding =

Studio album by Imminence
- Released: 26 November 2021
- Genre: Metalcore
- Length: 47:44
- Label: Arising Empire
- Producer: Eddie Berg; Harald Barret; Henrik Udd

Imminence chronology
Turn the Light On (2019)	Heaven in Hiding (2021)	The Black (2024)

Singles from Heaven in Hiding
- 1. "Temptation" Released: 23 April 2021; 2. "Heaven in Hiding" Released: 16 July 2021; 3. "Ghost" Released: 3 September 2021; 4. "Chasing Shadows" Released: 29 October 2021; 5. "Alleviate" Released: 12 November 2021

Deluxe edition album cover
- Artwork used for the deluxe edition album cover

Singles from Heaven in Hiding (Deluxe Edition)
- 1. "Tentación" Released: 8 April 2022; 2. "Heaven in Hiding (acoustic)" Released: 23 June 2022; 3. "Alleviate (acoustic)" Released: 31 August 2022; 4. "Ghost (acoustic)" Released: 28 September 2022; 5. "Jaded" Released: 10 February 2023

Heaven in Hiding is the fourth studio album by Swedish metalcore band Imminence. The album was released on 26 November 2021 through Arising Empire. It was produced by Eddie Berg, Harald Barret and Henrik Udd.

== Critical reception ==
Professional ratings
Review scores
Source	Rating
Distorted Sound	6/10

Distorted Sound scored the album 6 out of 10 and said: "Heaven in Hiding, for anyone who appreciates a solid metalcore album full of dynamic shifts, blanketed electronics, and soaring peaks and dipping valleys, is a perfectly fine album. It knows exactly what it is and it delivers in a solid manner. However, to those enmeshed in the seeming resurgence of metalcore pushing itself in new, exciting ways, this album will feel all too familiar. It may sound like Architects, but Imminence can certainly learn from those giants and work to use their greatest assets to craft a sound all their own, and instead of copying and pasting in the future, hopefully learning to craft a breath-taking new style of painting that can take its place in the current and continuing metalcore renaissance."

== Track listing ==
All tracks are written by Imminence.

Heaven in Hiding track listing
No.	Title	Length
1.	"I Am Become a Name..."	2:01
2.	"Ghost"	4:15
3.	"Temptation"	3:43
4.	"Surrender"	3:41
5.	"Chasing Shadows"	4:06
6.	"Moth to a Flame"	4:30
7.	"Alleviate"	4:27
8.	"Enslaved"	3:52
9.	"Disappear"	3:48
10.	"Lost and Left Behind"	4:34
11.	"این نیز بگذرد"	3:55
12.	"∞"	0:51
13.	"Heaven in Hiding"	3:56
Total length:		47:44

Deluxe edition
No.	Title	Length
14.	"Jaded"	4:27
15.	"Tentación"	3:40
16.	"Heaven in Hiding" (acoustic)	4:46
17.	"Alleviate" (acoustic)	4:22
18.	"Ghost" (acoustic)	4:11
19.	"Ghost" (live in Studio Mega)	4:16
20.	"Chasing Shadows" (live in Studio Mega)	4:07
21.	"Temptation" (live in Studio Mega)	3:50
22.	"Heaven in Hiding" (live in Studio Mega)	3:51
Total length:		85:14

== Personnel ==
Imminence

- Eddie Berg – lead vocals, violin, viola, choir, production
- Harald Barret – lead guitar, backing vocals, choir, acoustic guitar, electric bass, mandolin, production
- Alex Arnoldsson – rhythm guitar, choir
- Christian Höijer – bass, choir
- Peter Hanström – drums

Additional musicians

- Viktor Johannesson – cello
- Robert Kukla – additional guitar, additional vocals
- Jonas Flink – choir

Additional personnel

- Henrik Udd – production, engineering, mixing, mastering, drum engineering, drum editing
- Erik Karlsson – drum editing
- Christian Svedin and John Silver – drum engineering
- Jakob Koc – artwork, design, photography
- Oscar Dziedziela – photography
