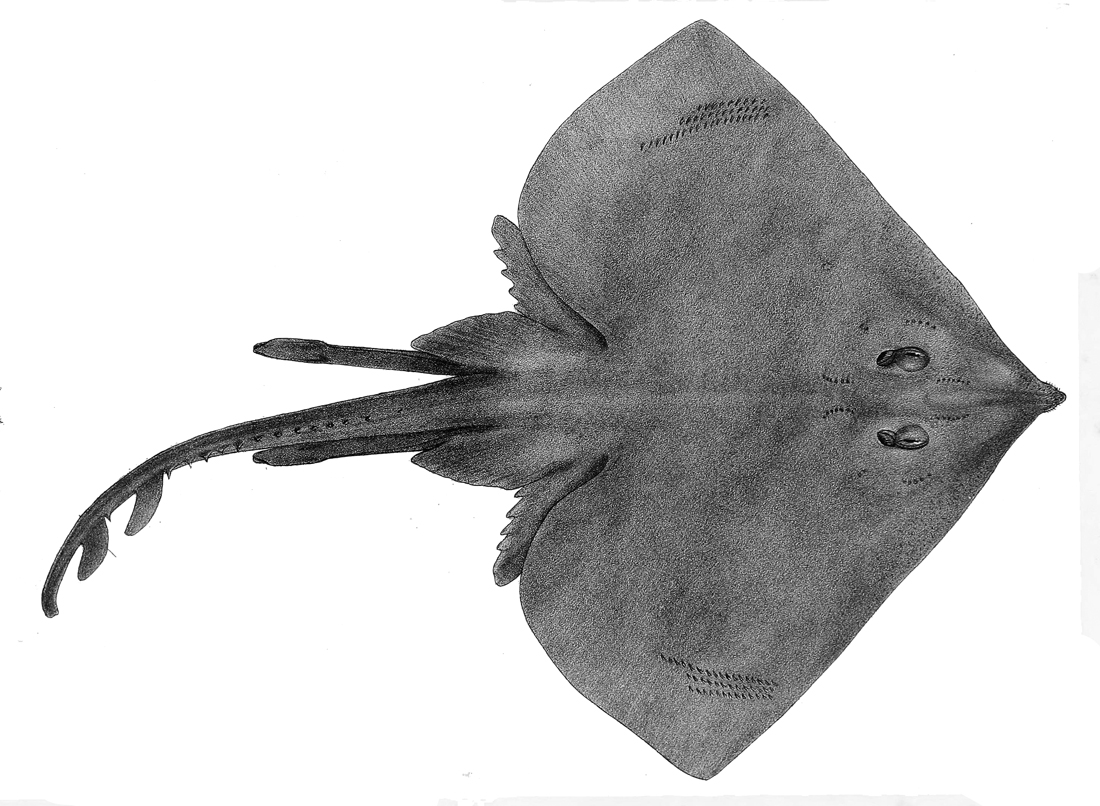
- Atlantoraja platana

Scientific classification
- Kingdom: Animalia
- Phylum: Chordata
- Class: Chondrichthyes
- Subclass: Elasmobranchii
- Order: Rajiformes
- Family: Arhynchobatidae
- Genus: Atlantoraja; Menni, 1972

= Atlantoraja =

Genus of cartilaginous fishes

Atlantoraja is a genus of skates in the family Arhynchobatidae. They are found from near sea level to depths of 300 metres (980 ft) in the Atlantic Ocean off Argentina, Brazil and Uruguay. These fish are all considered threatened due to the intense fishing pressure within their range.

== Species ==
There are three extant and one extinct species recognized within the genus:

- Atlantoraja castelnaui (A. Miranda-Ribeiro, 1907) (Spotback skate)
- †Atlantoraja cecilae (Steurbaut & Herman, 1978)
- Atlantoraja cyclophora (Regan, 1903) (Eyespot skate)
- Atlantoraja platana (Günther, 1880) (La Plata skate)
