= Ay =

Ay, AY or variants, may refer to:

== People ==
- Ay (pharaoh), a pharaoh of the 18th Egyptian dynasty
- Merneferre Ay, a pharaoh of the 13th Egyptian dynasty
- A.Y. (musician) (born 1981), a Tanzanian "bongo flava" artist
- AY, the stage name of Ayo Makun, a Nigerian actor, comedian, radio and television presenter, actor, writer, director and emcee
- Ay dynasty, a ruling lineage in south India
- Fatma Ay (born 1992), Turkish female handball player
- Savaş Ay (1954–2013), Turkish journalist
- Yeliz Ay (born 1977), Turkish female racewalker

== Places ==
- Aÿ, former commune of Marne département, France
- Ay (river), a river in Russia
- Antarctica (DAFIF 0413 / DIA 65-18 / FIPS PUB 10-4 territory code and obsolete NATO digram AY)
- Armenia (WMO country code AY)

== Language ==
- Aymara language (ISO-639 alpha-2 code AY)
- Ay, transliteration of Volapük Ä and ä

== Arts and entertainment ==
=== Characters and fictional entities ===
- Ay or A (エー, Ē), two characters from the manga Naruto and derived works

=== Music ===
- "Ay", a song by Tarkan from the 2001 album Karma
- ¡Ay!, a 2022 studio album by Lucrecia Dalt
- "Ay!", a song by Machine Gun Kelly from the 2022 album Mainstream Sellout

== Science ==
- Academic year, sometimes abbreviated as "AY"
- General Instrument AY-3-8910, a computer sound chip common in the 1980s and often referred to as the "AY chip"
- AY, IATA airline designator for Finnair

== See also ==
- Aye (disambiguation)
- Aylesbury, Buckinghamshire, England
- Eye (disambiguation)
