= AEY =

AEY or aey may refer to:

- AEY Inc., a former US-based weapons contractor; see Efraim Diveroli
- Air Italy (2005–2018) (ICAO code)
- Akureyri Airport in Akureyri Municipality, Iceland (IATA airport code AEY)
- Amele language (ISO 639-3 code)

== See also ==
- Aye (disambiguation)
