= Imminence (band) =

Swedish metalcore band

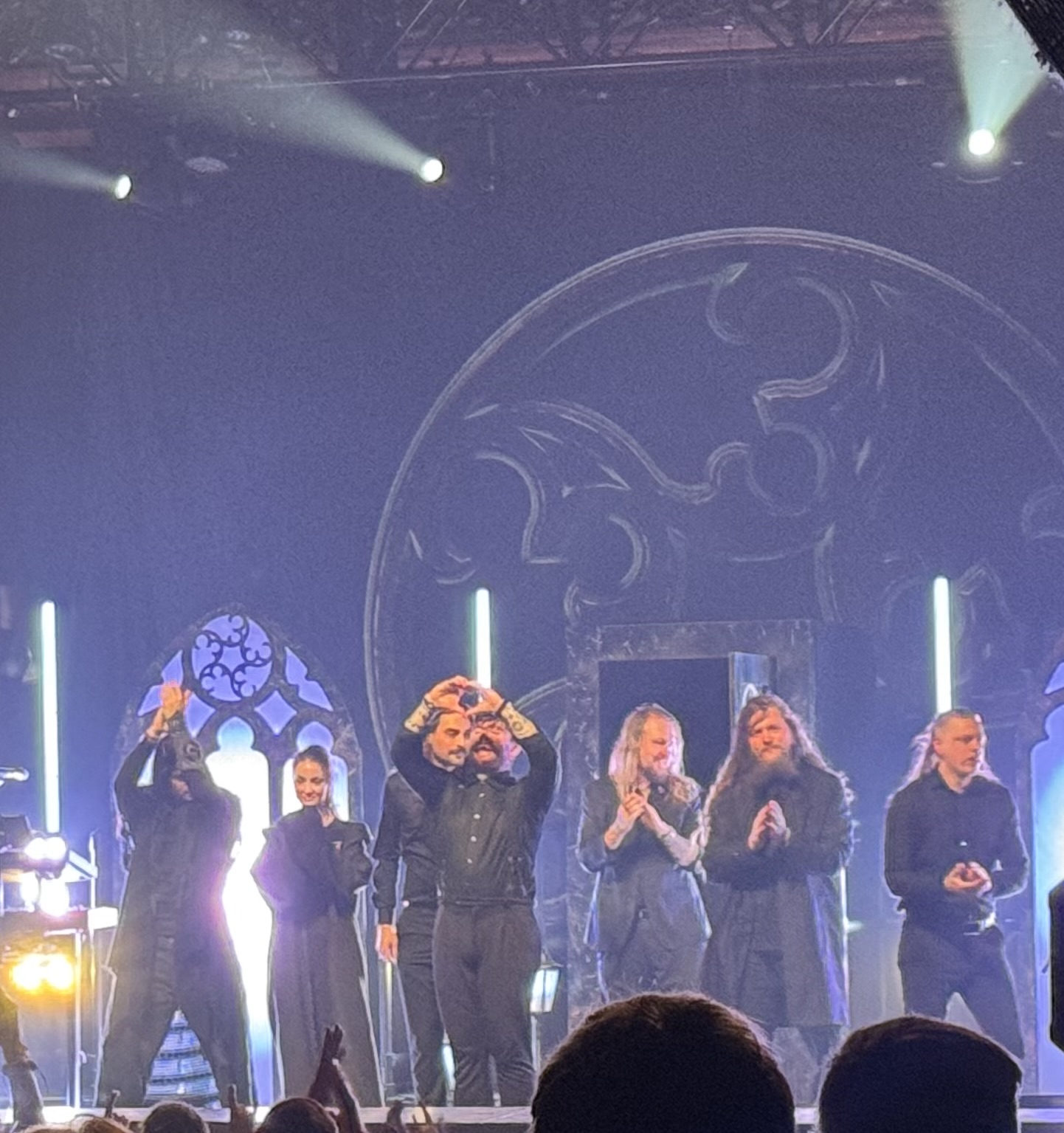
- The band in Denver in 2025

Background information
- Origin: Trelleborg, Sweden
- Genres: Metalcore; melodic metalcore; symphonic metalcore; alternative rock; post-hardcore
- Years active: 2009–present
- Labels: Sumerian; Arising Empire; We Are Triumphant
- Members: Eddie Berg; Harald Barrett; Alex Arnoldsson; Christian Höijer
- Past members: Fredrik Rosdahl; Max Holmberg; Peter Hanström
- Website: www.imminenceswe.com

Imminence is a Swedish metalcore band formed in Trelleborg. The group consists of vocalist Eddie Berg, rhythm guitarist Harald Barrett, lead guitarist Alex Arnoldsson, and bassist Christian Höijer.

== History ==
=== Formation and EPs (2009–2013) ===
Barrett and Berg formed the band in 2009 and decided on the name Imminence in 2010. Arnoldsson and Hanström joined the band in 2012.

In 2012, they released their debut EP, Born of Sirius, which was well received by fans and critics. That year, they were also selected to play at the Metaltown Festival, one of the largest music festivals in Sweden.

In 2013, Imminence signed a contract with We Are Triumphant Records, a sub-label for the Chicago-based record company Victory Records, where they released their second EP, Return for Helios, along with the single "Wine & Water".

=== I, This Is Goodbye, and Turn the Light On (2014–2020) ===
In 2014, the band released their debut album, I, which was accompanied by a series of music videos shot by singer Eddie Berg.

In 2015, they signed to Arising Empire and released the single "The Sickness", which has been described as a breakthrough single for the band.

The band released This Is Goodbye in 2017, in which the band experimented a different style, which has been described as alt-rock and pop rock.

In 2019, the band made a well-received return to their harder sound and released Turn the Light On, an album which the band has said "defines their sound". This was followed up by an acoustic version of the album the following year.

=== Heaven in Hiding (2021–2023) ===
The band release a single titled "Temptation" on 23 April 2021. Following the success of this single, the band announced a European tour taking place the following year. In September 2021, the band announced they would be releasing their fourth studio album Heaven in Hiding on 26 November 2021. The album, which the band described as "a further descent into darkness compared to previous albums", was well received and compared to bands such as Architects.

In February 2023, the band released the single "Jaded" and announced that a deluxe edition of the album would be released. The deluxe edition released on 3 March 2023, including new singles, as well as live and acoustic recordings.

=== The Black and Hanström's departure (2023–2025) ===
In June 2023, the band released the singles "Come Hell or High Water" and "Desolation". In August, "Heaven Shall Burn" was released, and in November the band released "Death by a Thousand Cuts". Following the release of the next single, "Continuum", in February 2024, the band announced their fifth studio album would be titled The Black. The album was self-released by the band on 12 April 2024, also announcing a European tour that year. During this tour, the band announced a North American tour taking place the following year.

A 10th anniversary re-recording of their debut I, titled The Reclamation of I, was released on 20 December 2024.

Ahead of their North American tour, the band released the singles "Death Shall Have No Dominion" and "God Fearing Man", and announced these would be released in an extended edition of The Black, titled The Return of the Black, which released on 7 March 2025, including re-recordings and included several featured artists.

On 15 September 2025, the band announced that Peter Hanström had departed from the band, and that Mikael Norén would fill in while the band were on tour.

=== Axis Mundi (2026–present) ===
On 11 June 2026, the band released the single "The Sword That Never Bends", their first release with Sumerian Records. On 21 July, the band released the single "False Light". The following day, the band announced their sixth studio album, Axis Mundi, as well as revealing its artwork and release date of 2 October 2026. Alongside the announcement, the band also released its third single "Crestfallen".

== Musical style and influences ==
Imminence's style has been described as metalcore, symphonic metalcore, atmospheric metalcore, melodic metalcore, alt-rock, post-hardcore, and 'violincore'.

The band has listed influences such as In Flames, Linkin Park, August Burns Red, Bon Iver, Sigur Rós, Being as an Ocean, Architects, Ólafur Arnalds, Johann Sebastian Bach, Cult of Luna and Coldplay.

== Members ==
Current

- Eddie Berg – lead vocals, violin, viola (2009–present)
- Harald Barrett – lead guitar, backing vocals (2009–present); rhythm guitar (2009–2012)
- Alex Arnoldsson – rhythm guitar (2009–present)
- Christian Höijer – bass (2018–present)

Former

- Fredrik Rosdahl – bass (2012–2014)
- Max Holmberg – bass (2015–2018)
- Peter Hanström – drums (2011–2025)

Timeline

== Discography ==
=== Studio albums ===
List of albums, with selected chart positions
Title	Album details	Peak chart positions								
Title	Album details	AUS	AUT	BEL (WA)	GER	SCO	SWI	UK Sales	UK Rock	US Sales
I	Released: 9 September 2014; Label: We Are Triumphant; Format: CD, streaming	—	—	—	—	—	—	—	—	—
This Is Goodbye	Released: 31 March 2017; Label: Arising Empire; Format: CD, LP, streaming	—	—	—	—	—	—	—	—	—
Turn the Light On	Released: 3 May 2019; Label: Arising Empire; Format: CD, LP, streaming	—	—	—	91	—	—	—	—	—
Heaven in Hiding	Released: 26 November 2021; Label: Arising Empire; Format: CD, LP, streaming	—	—	—	78	—	—	—	—	—
The Black	Released: 12 April 2024; Label: Self-released; Format: CD, CS, LP, streaming	—	—	—	61	—	—	—	—	—
Axis Mundi	Released: 2 October 2026; Label: Sumerian; Format: CD, LP, streaming	27	32	167	12	62	38	20	4	39
"—" denotes a recording that did not chart or was not issued in that region.

=== Re-recorded albums ===
List of re-recorded albums
Title	Album details
The Reclamation of I (re-recording of I)	Released: 20 December 2024; Label: Self-released; Format: CD, LP, streaming
The Return of The Black	Released: 7 March 2025; Label: Self-released; Format: CD, LP, streaming

=== EPs ===
List of extended plays
Title	EP details
Ascendance	Released: 15 November 2010; Label: Record Union
Born of Sirius	Released: 8 April 2012; Label: Self-released
Return to Helios	Released: 7 May 2013; Label: Self-released; Format: CD, streaming

=== Singles ===
List of singles with selected peak chart positions
Title	Year	Peak chart positions		Album
Title	Year	US Hard Rock	US Main.	Album
"Wine & Water"	2013	—	—	Return to Helios
"86"	2014	—	—	I
"The Seventh Seal"	2014	—	—	I
"A Mark on My Soul"	2015	—	—	Non-album single
"The Sickness"	2015	—	—	Non-album single
"Can We Give It All"	2016	—	—	Non-album single
"This Is Goodbye"	2017	—	—	This Is Goodbye
"Diamonds"	2017	—	—	This Is Goodbye
"Paralyzed"	2018	—	—	Turn the Light On
"Infectious"	2019	—	—	Turn the Light On
"Saturated Soul"	2019	—	—	Turn the Light On
"Lighthouse"	2019	—	—	Turn the Light On
"To the Light"	2020	—	—	Turn the Light On
"Temptation"	2021	—	—	Heaven in Hiding
"Heaven in Hiding"	2021	—	—	Heaven in Hiding
"Ghost"	2021	—	—	Heaven in Hiding
"Chasing Shadows"	2021	—	—	Heaven in Hiding
"Alleviate"	2021	—	—	Heaven in Hiding
"Tentación"	2022	—	—	Heaven in Hiding (Deluxe Edition)
"Heaven in Hiding" (acoustic)	2022	—	—	Heaven in Hiding (Deluxe Edition)
"Alleviate" (acoustic)	2022	—	—	Heaven in Hiding (Deluxe Edition)
"Ghost" (acoustic)	2022	—	—	Heaven in Hiding (Deluxe Edition)
"Jaded"	2023	—	—	Heaven in Hiding (Deluxe Edition)
"Come Hell or High Water"	2023	—	—	The Black
"Desolation"	2023	—	—	The Black
"Heaven Shall Burn"	2023	—	—	The Black
"Death by a Thousand Cuts"	2023	—	—	The Black
"Continuum"	2024	—	—	The Black
"The Black"	2024	—	—	The Black
"Death Shall Have No Dominion"	2025	—	—	The Return of The Black
"God Fearing Man"	2025	25	—	The Return of The Black
"The Sword That Never Bends"	2026	—	—	Axis Mundi
"False Light"	2026	—	—	Axis Mundi
"Crestfallen"	2026	—	22	Axis Mundi
"If Not Now, When"	2026	—	—	Axis Mundi

=== Music videos ===
List of music videos, showing year released, album and director
Title	Year	Album	Director	Link
"The Devourer"	2012	Born of Sirius		
"Wine & Water"	2013	Return to Helios	Eddie Berg	
"Snakes & Ladders"	2013	Return to Helios	Eddie Berg	
"Mors Certa"	2013	Return to Helios	Eddie Berg	
"Hora Incerta"	2014	Return to Helios	Eddie Berg	
"86"	2014	I	Eddie Berg	
"The Seventh Seal"	2014	I		
"Wine & Water" (acoustic)	2015	Non-album single		
"A Mark on My Soul"	2015	Non-album single	Eddie Berg	
"The Sickness"	2015	Non-album single		
"Can We Give It All"	2016	Non-album single		
"This Is Goodbye"	2017	This Is Goodbye		
"Diamonds"	2017	This Is Goodbye		
"Broken Love"	2017	This Is Goodbye		
"Up"	2017	This Is Goodbye		
"This Is Goodbye" (acoustic)	2018	This Is Goodbye	Eddie Berg	
"Paralyzed"	2018	Turn the Light On	Pavel Trebukhin	
"Infectious"	2019	Turn the Light On	Eddie Berg	
"Saturated Soul"	2019	Turn the Light On	Pavel Trebukhin	
"Lighthouse"	2019	Turn the Light On		
"Erase"	2019	Turn the Light On	Pavel Trebukhin	
"Saturated Soul" (acoustic)	2019	Turn the Light On	Eddie Berg	
"Crawling" (Linkin Park cover)	2019	Turn the Light On	Eddie Berg	
"Temptation"	2021	Heaven in Hiding	Tre Film	
"Heaven in Hiding"	2021	Heaven in Hiding	Tre Film	
"Ghost"	2021	Heaven in Hiding	Tre Film	
"Chasing Shadows & Alleviate"	2021	Heaven in Hiding	Tre Film	
"Surrender"	2021	Heaven in Hiding	Tre Film	
"Come Hell or High Water"	2023	The Black	Pavel Trebukhin	
"Desolation"	2023	The Black	Pavel Trebukhin	
"Heaven Shall Burn"	2023	The Black	Pavel Trebukhin	
"Death by a Thousand Cuts"	2023	The Black	Pavel Trebukhin	
"Continuum"	2024	The Black	Pavel Trebukhin	
"The Black"	2024	The Black	Pavel Trebukhin	
"Death Shall Have No Dominion	2025	The Return of The Black	Pavel Trebukhin	
"God Fearing Man	2025	The Return of The Black	Pavel Trebukhin	
"The Sword That Never Bends"	2026	Axis Mundi	Pavel Trebukhin	
"False Light"	2026	Axis Mundi	Pavel Trebukhin	
"If Not Now, When"	2026	Axis Mundi	Pavel Trebukhin	
"Crestfallen"	2026	Axis Mundi	Pavel Trebukhin	

== Awards and nominations ==
Year	Organization	Award	Nominated work	Result	Ref.
2025	Nik Nocturnal Awards	Breakdown of the Year	Death Shall Have No Dominion	Nominated	
2025	Nik Nocturnal Awards	Music Video of the Year	"God Fearing Man"	Nominated	
2025	Nik Nocturnal Awards	Song of the Year	"God Fearing Man"	Nominated	
