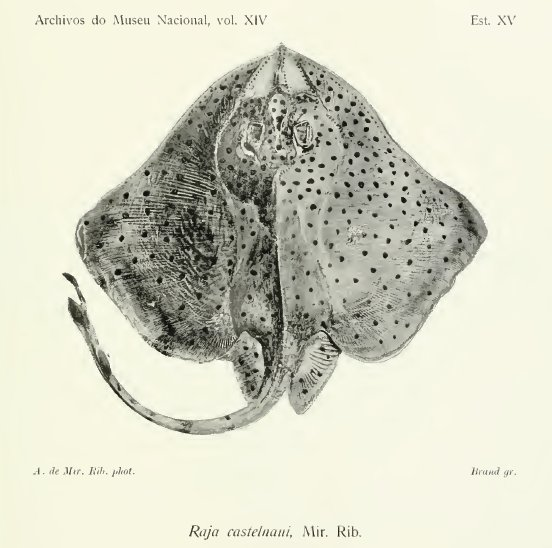

Conservation status
- Critically Endangered (IUCN 3.1)

Scientific classification
- Kingdom: Animalia
- Phylum: Chordata
- Class: Chondrichthyes
- Subclass: Elasmobranchii
- Order: Rajiformes
- Family: Arhynchobatidae
- Genus: Atlantoraja
- Species: A. castelnaui

Binomial name
- Atlantoraja castelnaui (A. Miranda-Ribeiro, 1907)

= Spotback skate =

Species of fish

The spotback skate (Atlantoraja castelnaui) is a species of fish in the family Arhynchobatidae. It is found off the Atlantic coasts of Argentina, Brazil, and Uruguay where its natural habitat is over the continental shelf in the open sea. It is a large fish, growing to over a metre in length. It feeds mainly on other fish according to availability, with shrimps, octopuses and other invertebrates also being eaten. Reproduction takes place throughout most of the year, with the eggs being laid in capsules that adhere to the seabed. The spotback skate is the subject of a fishery and is thought to be overfished, resulting in Greenpeace adding the fish to its red list of fish to be avoided, and the International Union for Conservation of Nature listing it as a critically endangered species.

== Distribution ==
The Atlantoraja castelnaui are found in the Southwest South Atlantic Ocean from Rio de Janeiro State in Brazil to Argentina. They prefer warm-temperate waters at depths ranging from 20 to 220 m. In Argentina, they can be found as natives to the Argentinian Zoogeographic Province. They seek warm water climates, and are often reported to have a more southern distribution than normal in correlation with higher water temperatures. Spotback skates may migrate only slightly or perform slight periodic backwards and forwards movement depending on ocean water temperatures. However, there is no notable seasonal variation for the species as they populate southern waters year round.

Although the location of their distribution has not been affected, the quantity of the spotback's distribution has lowered in many places and continues to be threatened by humans fishing in its habitats.

== Reproduction ==
The length of maturity for males and females differ with males ranging from 185 to 1250 mm in total length and females ranging from 243 to 1368 mm in total length. Males have a continuous production of mature spermatozoa suggests they can reproduce throughout the year but studies have shown higher values in certain months but they are not significant. Females also reproduce year-round with peaks of reproductive activity as well.

Female spotback skates lay their eggs on the ocean floor and leave them there. There is not parental care so the eggs have a capsule that protects the embryo's development once the mother leaves. Collected egg capsules typically are rectangular and have horny process in each corner. They are also shiny and are medium brown in color. The capsules on the eggs are covered by adhesion fibrils that allow the egg to attach itself to the sea floor immediately after the mother releases them. These adhesion fibrils are also seen in other species of skates. The surface of the capsule is striated and presents a rough surface though it is relatively smooth. Atlantoraja castelnaui capsule's are also the largest egg capsule in its genus and compared to other co-occurring species in the same area and depth of the ocean.

== Conservation status ==
In the cities of Santos and Guarujá, specimens of the spotback skate which are deemed large enough to have commercial value are commonly landed and marketed. From 1999 to present, the market for the meat of the spotback skate has expanded to Asia, particularly South Korea. As a result, commercial fishing has led to an overexploitation of the species and its consequent listing as an endangered species.

Spotback skates are particularly vulnerable to extinction due to their large body size relative to other skate species. According to Dulvy & Reynolds (2002), skate species considered to be locally extinct have larger body sizes compared to all other skates. Large body size is in turn correlated with higher mortality rates and with life-history parameters such as late age at maturity. Another study by García et al. (2007) also corroborated the notion that a large body size increased the extinction risk in elasmobranchs. Spotback skates are also especially vulnerable to trawl fisheries because they inhabit the soft bottom substrates of the ocean (Ebert; Sulikowski, 2007). Consequently, the biomass of spotback skates has decreased by 75% from 1994 to 1999.

== Behavior and eating habits ==
The spotback skate is found across most of the continental shelf year round. The spotback skate's diet is a versatile and mainly piscivorous consumer. Their diet shifts with increasing body size and as a response to seasonal and regional changes in prey abundance and distribution. They prey mostly on teleost, cephalopods, elasmobranchs, and decapods. Smaller spotback skate tend to consume decapods and the larger skates eat elasmobranchs and cephalopods. The consumption of teleosts differed between seasons depending on whether the teleost were demersal- benthic or benthic. The more demersal- benthic teleosts were consumed during the cold season while the benthic teleosts were eaten during the warm season. The decapods, cephalopods and elasmobranchs were predominantly shrimps, octopuses, and skates. The main cephalopod consumed in the warm season was the octopus.

== Parasites ==
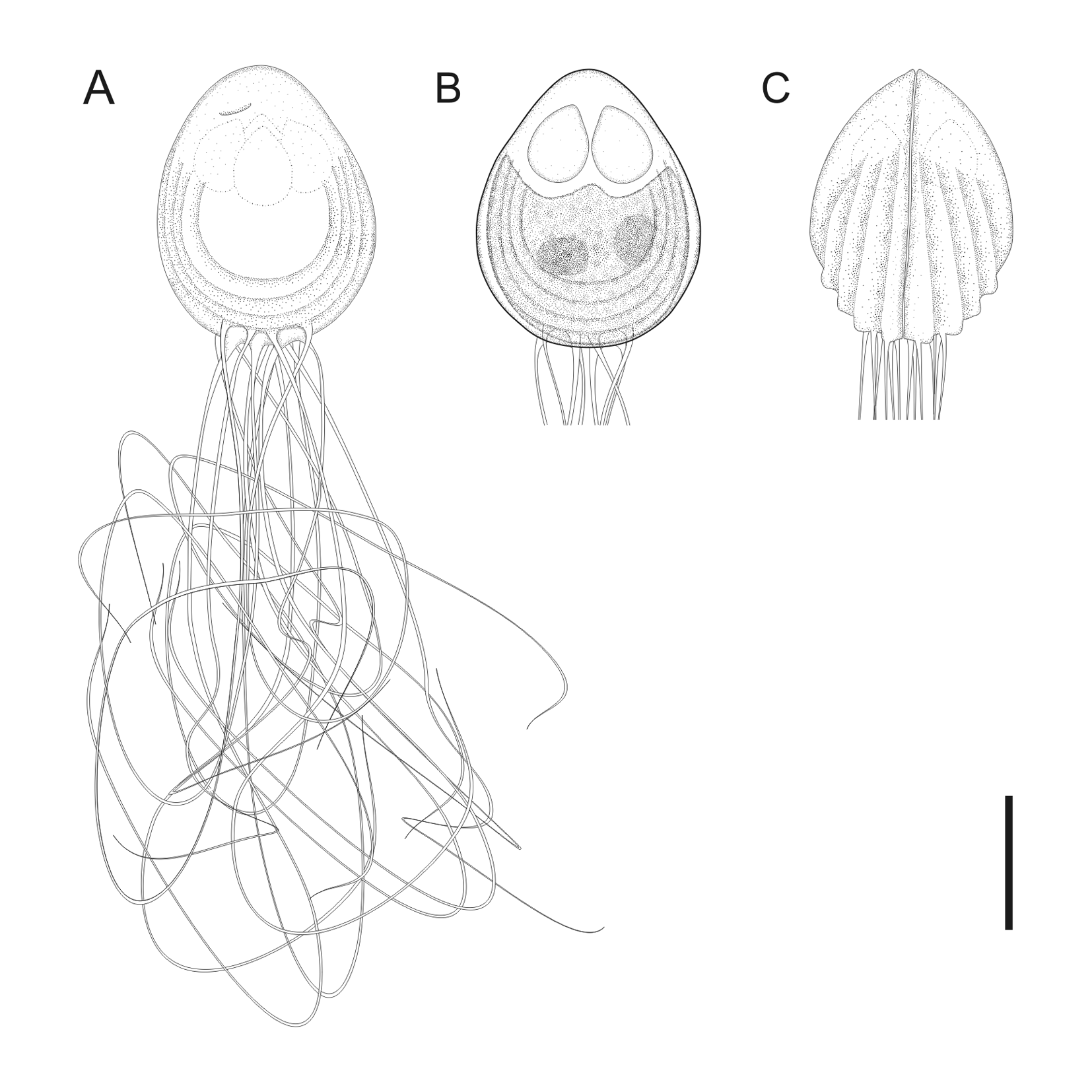
Chloromyxum atlantoraji, a Myxozoan parasite of spotback skates in Argentina

Like all fish species, spotback skates have a variety of parasites; these include copepods, nematodes and Myxozoans.

== Sustainable consumption ==
In 2010, Greenpeace International has added the spotback skate to its seafood red list. "The Greenpeace International seafood red list is a list of fish that are commonly sold in supermarkets around the world, and which have a very high risk of being sourced from unsustainable fisheries."
