= Eyes (disambiguation) =

Eyes are the organs of vision.

Eyes or The Eyes may also refer to:

== Film and television ==
- The Eyes (2016 film), an American crime drama film
- The Eyes (2026 film), a South Korean horror film
- "Eyes", a segment of the 1969 horror anthology film Night Gallery
- Eyes (TV series), a 2005 American crime drama series
- "Eyes" (Babylon 5), a 1994 TV episode
- "Eyes" (Space: Above and Beyond), a 1995 TV episode
- "The Eyes" (Adventure Time), a 2010 TV episode

== Music ==
- The Eyes (band), a 1960s English psychedelic rock band
- Eyes (album), by Eddy Raven, 1980
- "Eyes" (song), by Donna Summer, 1985
- "Eyes", a song by Iz*One from Bloom*Iz, 2020
- "Eyes", a song by Kaskade from Fire & Ice, 2011
- "Eyes", a song by Rüfüs Du Sol from Solace, 2018
- "Eyes", a song by Tracy Bonham from Blink the Brightest, 2005
- "Eyes", a song by Yeule from Glitch Princess, 2022
- "The Eyes", a song by David Byrne and Brian Eno from Everything That Happens Will Happen Today, 2008

== Other uses ==
- Eyes (cheese), holes in cheese
- Eyes (video game), a 1982 arcade game
- Eyes Galaxies, in the constellation Virgo
- The Eyes (novel series), a 1970s science fiction trilogy by Richard Gordon, writing as Stuart Gordon
- The Eyes, a 1999 book of poetry by Don Paterson

== See also ==
- Eye (disambiguation)
- Eyeball (disambiguation)
