= Eyespot =

Eyespot can mean:

== Visual features ==
- Eyespot (mimicry), a color mark that looks somewhat like an eye
- Eyespot, a sensory organ of invertebrates; see simple eye in invertebrates
- Eyespot, a type of eye in some gastropods, a part of sensory organs of gastropods
- Eyespot apparatus, a photoreceptive organelle found in the flagellate (motile) cells unicellular photosynthetic organisms

== Diseases ==
- Eyespot (wheat), a disease of wheat.
- Groundnut eyespot virus, a plant pathogenic virus

== Fish species ==
- Eyespot gourami (Parasphaerichthys ocellatus)
- Eyespot puffer (Tetraodon biocellatus)
- Eyespot skate (Atlantoraja cyclophora)

== Reptile species ==
- Eyespot gecko (Gonatodes ocellatus)

== See also ==
- Floaters
