= The Black (Imminence album) =

Studio album by Imminence
- Released: 12 April 2024
- Genre: Metalcore
- Length: 51:53
- Label: Self-released
- Producers: Eddie Berg; Harald Barrett; Henrik Udd

Imminence chronology
Heaven in Hiding (2021)	The Black (2024)	Axis Mundi (2026)

Singles from The Black
- 1. "Come Hell or High Water" Released: 18 June 2023; 2. "Desolation" Released: 23 June 2023; 3. "Heaven Shall Burn" Released: 25 August 2023; 4. "Death by a Thousand Cuts" Released: 17 November 2023; 5. "Continuum" Released: 9 February 2024; 6. "The Black" Released: 15 March 2024

Extended edition cover

Singles from The Return of The Black
- 1. "Death Shall Have No Dominion" Released: 7 February 2025; 2. "God Fearing Man" Released: 5 March 2025

The Black is the fifth studio album by Swedish metalcore band Imminence. The album was self-released by the band on 12 April 2024. It was produced by Eddie Berg, Harald Barrett and Henrik Udd. This was the final album with drummer Peter Hanström after being active from 2009 until his release in September 2025.

On 7 March 2025, the band released an extended edition of the album titled The Return of The Black. This edition features three new tracks, three remixes, and five new editions of songs featuring guest vocalists.

== Critical reception ==
Professional ratings
Review scores
Source	Rating
Distorted Sound	9/10
Ghost Cult	9/10
Louder Sound	3.5/5 stars

Distorted Sound scored the album 9 out of 10 and said: "Imminence aren't just a band, they're an experience, a feeling, a state of mind. The Black cements their place within the metalcore hierarchy. Expect even bigger things to come." Ghost Cult gave the album a score 9/10 and saying: "With such theatrical innovation that challenges and transcends Metalcore, Imminence have become pioneers of a style that can best be described as Violincore. While each preceding album was a step in the right direction, The Black pulls off just the sound they were always meant to create." Louder Sound gave the album a positive review and stated: "The Swedes' four studio albums so far have seen them tinker with overly polished production and the kind of atmospheric metalcore Architects left behind six years ago (2021's solid, albeit repetitive Heaven in Hiding bore more than a passing resemblance to Sam Carter and co), but with The Black, they've taken a step forward."

== Track listing ==
All lyrics are written by Eddie Berg; all music is composed by Berg and Harald Barrett.

The Black track listing
No.	Title	Length
1.	"Come Hell or High Water"	3:49
2.	"Desolation"	4:07
3.	"Heaven Shall Burn"	4:07
4.	"Beyond the Pale"	4:13
5.	"Death by a Thousand Cuts"	5:26
6.	"Come What May"	6:13
7.	"Cul-de-Sac"	2:36
8.	"The Call of the Void"	3:51
9.	"Continuum"	4:20
10.	"L'appel du Vide"	3:57
11.	"The Black"	6:10
12.	"Le Noir"	3:04
Total length:		51:53

The Return of The Black track listing
No.	Title	Length
1.	"God Fearing Man"	5:20
2.	"Come Hell or High Water"	3:51
3.	"Desolation"	4:10
4.	"Heaven Shall Burn" (featuring Scott Kennedy)	4:11
5.	"Beyond the Pale"	4:14
6.	"Death by a Thousand Cuts" (featuring Lucas Woodland)	5:29
7.	"Come What May" (featuring Tim Charles)	6:13
8.	"Cul-de-Sac"	2:36
9.	"Death Shall Have No Dominion"	4:49
10.	"The Call of the Void" (featuring Joel Holmqvist)	3:50
11.	"Continuum" (featuring Niklas Karlsson)	4:21
12.	"L'Appel du Vide"	3:56
13.	"The Black"	6:10
14.	"Le Noir"	3:04
15.	"Come Hell or High Water" (VAAAL remix)	4:13
16.	"The Black" (VAAAL remix)	4:51
17.	"The Blvck" (SENA remix)	4:11
18.	"La Douleur Qui Est Sans Fin"	8:45
Total length:		83:54

=== Notes ===
- Track 17 on The Return of The Black is stylised in all uppercase.

== Personnel ==
Imminence

- Eddie Berg – lead vocals, violin, production
- Harald Barrett – lead guitar, backing vocals, production
- Alex Arnoldsson – rhythm guitar
- Christian Höijer – bass
- Peter Hanström – drums

Additional personnel

- Henrik Udd – production

== Charts ==
Chart performance for The Black
Chart (2024)	Peak position
German Albums (Offizielle Top 100)	61
