= This Is Goodbye =

Studio album by Imminence
- Released: 31 March 2017
- Genres: Alternative rock; pop rock
- Length: 56:25
- Label: Arising Empire
- Producer: Imminence

Imminence chronology
| I (2014) | This Is Goodbye (2017) | Turn the Light On (2019) |

Singles from This Is Goodbye
- 1. "This Is Goodbye" Released: 20 January 2017; 2. "Diamonds" Released: 17 February 2017

This Is Goodbye is the second studio album by Swedish metalcore band Imminence. The album was released on 31 March 2017 through Arising Empire and was self-produced by the band.

== Critical reception ==
Professional ratings
Review scores
| Source | Rating |
|---|---|
| Depth | Positive |
| Louder Sound | 1.5/5 stars |
| New Noise Magazine | 2.5/5 stars |

The album received mostly positive reviews, but also mixed reviews from several critics. Depth praised the album saying, "Imminence have created something really powerful with This Is Goodbye. The album is a collection of songs with heart powerfully bared, moving between stadium-strong rock sound and dance beats. They truly have showcased their versatility, just as they set out to do, and have defined a sound of their own from which to continue their evolution as exceptional musicians." Louder Sound gave the album a slightly negative review and stated: "A band this young could yet find a huge audience with their combination of metal and pop. But on this evidence, the formula needs considerable work." New Noise Magazine gave the album 2.5 out of 5 and noted a different direction of "soaring alt-rock" and "highly polished pop rock", as opposed to their metalcore roots, stating that despite the mediocre quality in the songs, "the talent is there for something close to greatness for Imminence, and considering how catchy (though forgettable) This Is Goodbye is at times, let's hope that this isn't goodbye. Instead, let's hope this is the start of a new, compelling chapter for the young Swedish group."

== Track listing ==
All tracks are written by Imminence.

This Is Goodbye track listing
| No. | Title | Length |
|---|---|---|
| 1. | "This Is Goodbye" | 3:42 |
| 2. | "Diamonds" | 4:02 |
| 3. | "Broken Love" | 4:07 |
| 4. | "Coming Undone" | 3:57 |
| 5. | "Up" | 4:34 |
| 6. | "Daggers" | 3:47 |
| 7. | "Cold as Stone" | 4:00 |
| 8. | "Keep Me" | 3:55 |
| 9. | "Not a Rescue" | 4:00 |
| 10. | "Ivory Black" | 4:02 |
| 11. | "Desert Place" | 4:00 |
| 12. | "Diamonds" (acoustic) | 3:56 |
| 13. | "Keep Me" (acoustic) | 3:54 |
| 14. | "This Is Goodbye" (acoustic) | 4:23 |
| Total length: | | 56:25 |

== Personnel ==
Imminence

- Eddie Berg – lead vocals, violin, arranging
- Harald Barret – lead guitar, backing vocals, acoustic guitar, arranging
- Alex Arnoldsson – rhythm guitar
- Max Holmberg – bass
- Peter Hanström – drums

Additional personnel

- Imminence – production
- Fredrik Berlin – mixing, arranging
- Dino Medanhodzic – mixing
- Martin Ankelius – mastering
- Jakob Koc – artwork
