= Chih-Lin I =

Chinese telecommunications engineer

Chih-Lin I is a Chinese telecommunications engineer, the chief scientist of wireless technologies at China Mobile.

== Education and career ==
I began studying electrical engineering as an undergraduate at National Chiao Tung University in Taiwan. After graduating in 1979, and receiving a master's degree from Syracuse University in 1980, she completed her Ph.D. at Stanford University in 1987.

She has worked as a researcher at Bell Labs, as director of wireless communications infrastructure and access technology for AT&T, as director of wireless communication technology for the Industrial Technology Research Institute in Taiwan, as a vice president for the Hong Kong Applied Science and Technology Research Institute, and as the head of the Green Communication Research Center of the China Mobile Research Institute.

She became chief scientist at China Mobile in 2011.

== Selected publications ==
I is a coauthor of the book Green and Software-defined Wireless Networks: From Theory to Practice (with Guanding Yu, Shuangfeng Han, and Geoffrey Ye Li, Cambridge University Press, 2019).

A paper by I with Ender Ayanoglu, Israel Bar-David, and Richard D. Gitlin, "Analog diversity coding to provide transparent self-healing communication networks", was the 1995 winner of the IEEE Communications Society Stephen O. Rice Paper Award. Another of her papers, with Shuangfeng Han, Zhikun Xu, and Rowell Corbett, "Large-Scale Antenna Systems with Hybrid Analog and Digital Beamforming for Millimeter Wave 5G", was the 2018 winner of the IEEE Communications Society Fred W. Ellersick Paper Award.

== Recognition ==
I was the 2015 recipient of the IEEE Communications Society Industrial Innovation Award. She was elected as an IEEE Fellow in 2021, "for leadership in wireless mobile networks".
