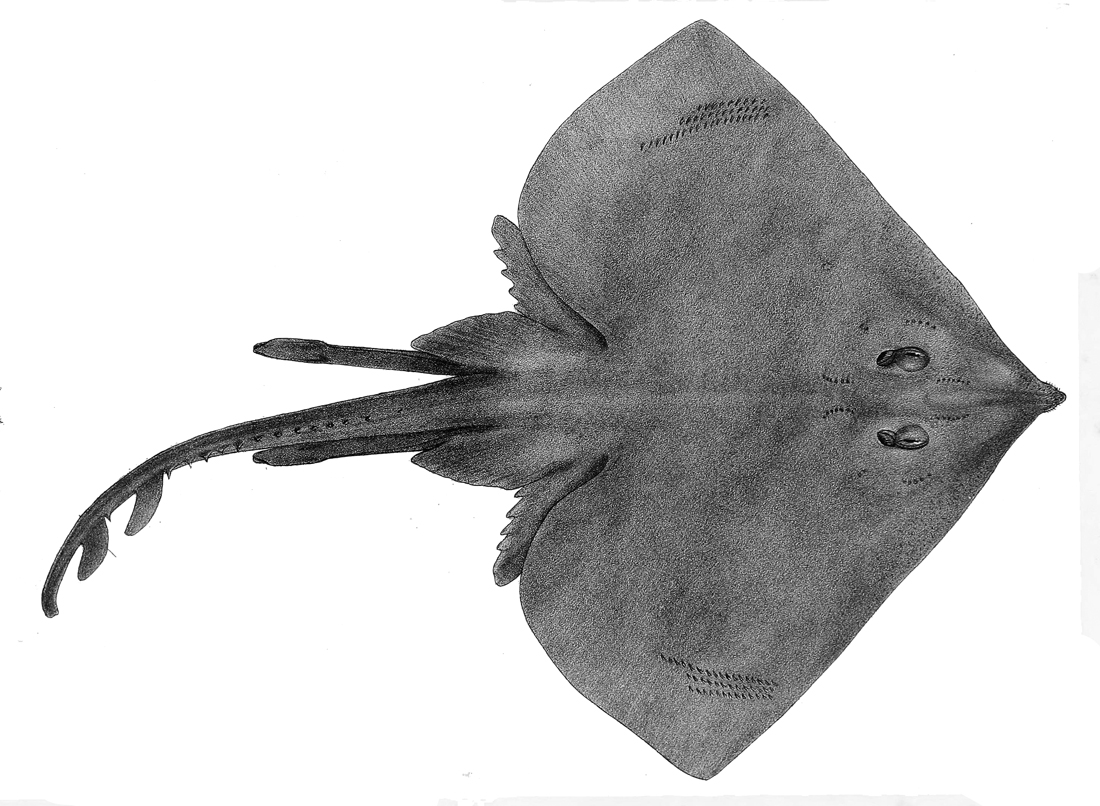

Conservation status
- Endangered (IUCN 3.1)

Scientific classification
- Domain: Eukaryota
- Kingdom: Animalia
- Phylum: Chordata
- Class: Chondrichthyes
- Subclass: Elasmobranchii
- Order: Rajiformes
- Family: Arhynchobatidae
- Genus: Atlantoraja
- Species: A. platana

Binomial name
- Atlantoraja platana (Günther, 1880)

= La Plata skate =

Species of fish

The La Plata skate (Atlantoraja platana) is a species of fish in the family Arhynchobatidae. It lives off the coast of Brazil, Uruguay and Argentina in depths ranging from 19 to 181 meters. Its total length is about 60 centimeters. Males reach maturity when 86% of total length which means about 47 to 53 centimeters. Females attain maturity at 94% of total length, 45 to 50 centimeters. It is oviparous, lays oblong egg capsules with horned corners. Feeds small fish, penaeid crustaceans and cephalopods. It is relative rare with population trend decreasing, major threat being fishing, although it is mainly a bycatch.
