= Agent 64: Spies Never Die =

- Developer: Replicant D6
- Engine: Unity
- Platform: Windows
- Release: August 11, 2026
- Genre: First-person shooter
- Modes: Single-player, Multiplayer

Agent 64: Spies Never Die is a retro first-person shooter video game, inspired by the 1997 Nintendo 64 game GoldenEye 007. It was released for Windows in August 2026.

== Gameplay ==
Agent 64 is a retro-styled first-person shooter, designed to emulate the look and feel of "classic 90s console shooters", and featuring "state-of-the-art 1997 enemy AI." Multiple publications have drawn parallels between the gameplay of Agent 64 and classic shooters such as GoldenEye 007 (1997) and Perfect Dark (2000) for the Nintendo 64, and the TimeSplitters series (2000–2005) for the PlayStation 2.

In the game’s 14-mission campaign (which can be played co-operatively by up to 2 players via split-screen, or up to 4 players online), players take on the role of secret agent John Walter (formerly known by the codename '64') as he attempts to stop his nemesis, Dominic Pulp. Missions combine gun combat, exploration and objective-based level design. Players can complete optional challenges to unlock over 70 cheats and mods which alter gameplay, including slower bullets, disabled reloading, and random weapon changes.

Additionally, the game features competitive multiplayer modes, which support up to 4 players via split-screen or up to 8 players online. These modes also include the option to add bots alongside human players.

== Development ==
Agent 64 was built (using the Unity engine) to specifically replicate the feel of a Nintendo 64 game. It was first teased in 2021 by France-based solo developer Replicant D6, with an early demo released in the same year.

It was initially set for release in 2022; however, this release date was pushed back, resulting in a five-and-a-half year development process described by D6 as "grueling." A new playable beta demo (featuring one level) was released on Steam in mid-2022, as part of the Steam ‘Next Fest’. A trailer was also shown in June 2022, as part of the PC Gaming Show.

Although the game had been initially developed without multiplayer functionality, split-screen multiplayer was added in 2023, alongside a new trailer, and online-play was added in 2025. Registration for a public playtest of the game on Steam began in September 2025. This was followed by the release of a third demo, featuring two levels, in July 2026. The game's August 2026 release date was announced, alongside a new trailer, in the same month.

== Release ==
Agent 64 was released on PC via Steam on 11th August, 2026. It is also set to release on console, but the timing has been described by D6 as "classified."

== Reception ==
Reception

Aggregate scores
Aggregator	Score
Metacritic	72/100
OpenCritic	73% recommend

Review score
Publication	Score
Shacknews	8/10

Agent 64 received an aggregated score of 72 from 17 critics (indicating 'Mixed or Average' reception) according to the review aggregator Metacritic. Fellow review aggregator OpenCritic assessed that the game received strong approval, being recommended by 73% of critics.

Lucas White of Shacknews scored the game 8 out of 10, calling it "a fun shooter that goes above and beyond to act as an accurate facsimile of Nintendo 64 shooters, particularly Goldeneye 007;" however, other reviewers felt that this strict adherence to Nintendo 64 gameplay and controls prevented the game reaching its full potential: In his 3 out of 5 review, Alex Spencer of The Guardian described the game as "an agreeable set of straightahead shooting missions that hark back to a simpler time, with simpler controls," and Zack Zwiezen of Kotaku commented that it "likely won’t appeal much to people who didn’t grow up playing and loving the N64 shooters it was inspired by" but is "a damn good time" for players who did. Contrastingly, Eurogamer's Fran Ruiz commented that aspects of Agent 64's gameplay went beyond that of GoldenEye:

"The aiming is snappier, the levels are more sprawling, and there are subtle but welcome quality-of-life additions to the shooting and movement which feel heavily influenced by other ancient FPS titles like the original Turok games and even Valve's first Half-Life."

Franz Christian Irorita from GameDaily highlighted that whilst reviewers of the game "disagree sharply on whether that faithfulness is enough to recommend on its own" (with review scores ranging from 90/100 to 50/100), the game's Steam reviews were far more one-sided, with Agent 64 holding a 'Very Positive' user rating on Steam, from 90% positivity across the 203 user reviews received as of August 12, 2026.
