= GoldenEye: Source =

2010 video game remake mod

- Developer: Team GoldenEye: Source
- Initial release: WW: December 10, 2010
- Stable release: 5.0.6 / August 9, 2017
- Written in: C++
- Engine: Source
- Operating system: Windows
- Size: 10 GB
- Type: First-person shooter
- License: GPLv3
- Website: geshl2.com
- Repository: GitHub

GoldenEye: Source is an unlicensed total conversion mod developed using Valve's Source engine. It is a multiplayer remake of the 1997 Nintendo 64 video game GoldenEye 007, itself based on the James Bond film GoldenEye. The mod's development began in 2005, and remains in active development as of 2024.

== Gameplay ==
GoldenEye: Source is an online multiplayer arena first-person shooter that aims to provide a faithful and also expanded re-creation of GoldenEye 007's multiplayer including additional game modes, re-creations of single-player levels that were not originally accessible in GoldenEye 007's multiplayer modes, and weapons which were only accessible using cheats.

Classic GoldenEye multiplayer maps like Complex, Library, and Facility are joined by modernized single-player levels such as Silo, Aztec, Dam, Runway, Depot, Cradle, and Control, with the level design of each tweaked substantially for multiplayer while staying as true as possible to the single-player missions that inspired them. Several maps – including Archives, Complex, Basement, Facility, Temple, and Bunker – have been made in both their "classic" original and reimagined form, while other maps from the original game only exist in their reimagined form in GoldenEye: Source, including Egyptian, Caverns, and Caves. The game also features special maps like Casino – based on the 2006 Bond film Casino Royale – and Facility Backzone, which itself is a reimagined version of the second half of the original Nintendo 64 mission's layout.

Matches take place on individual levels which are divided into several rounds, each round lasts a number of minutes and typically whichever player or team with the highest score at the end of the round will win that round. However the player or team with the most cumulative score at the end of the match will ultimately win once the map time expires.

Each player has a radar display on their screen which shows in real-time the relative position of other players in the match. In game modes which have objectives or special pick-ups such as the Golden Gun players are identified on the radar with a corresponding color. The radar is also typically off for certain gamemodes where it presents a competitive disadvantages, such as in License to Kill mode.

Server administrators also have the option to turn on or off classic features like paintball mode, or disable jumping, which was not part of the original game.

=== Weapon selection ===
Unlike many arena first-person shooters, GoldenEye: Source does not have set weapons on each level. Instead a different weapon set will populate the many weapon spawns and corresponding ammunition pick-ups around the map on each round. Weapon spawns have a value of 1 to 8, to which weapon sets of 8 preset weapons will be assigned. There are numerous weapon sets available in the game as well as the capability for players and server hosts to create their own. Some game modes will prompt the automatic generation of weaponsets designed to best accommodate that mode.

=== Game modes ===
- Arsenal: A free-for-all mode where players start with the most powerful weapon in the game and for each single kill they are forced to use progressively weaker weapons until the final weapon, the hunting knife. Whoever kills with the final weapon wins the round. Melee kills will deduct a point from opponents and set them back one weapon.
- Capture the Flag: A traditional take on capture the flag. Each team is assigned an area of the map to be their base, in which they must defend their flag from the enemy team whilst attempting to retrieve the other team's flag and return it to their base with the caveat that a flag cannot be captured whilst the other team possesses the opponent's flag. The team with the most captures when the time limit is reached wins, and a tie results in a sudden-death round where players who die are eliminated and unable to respawn.
- Deathmatch: Classic free-for-all combat where the winner is whoever has the most kills when the time runs out, typically set to four or five minutes, although longer for tournament play.
- License to Kill: Similar to Deathmatch with the exception that every weapon will kill an opponent in a single hit. Typically the radar is disabled during this game mode.
- Living Daylights: A certain number of flags are spawned around the map, when a player picks one up they start to accumulate points, get a slight speed boost, and can no longer use any weapon except for the flag as a melee weapon. Hitting and killing other players with the flag allows for point stealing. Picking up weapons, ammunition and armor allows for quicker point scoring. The goal is to have the most points at the end of the road.
- Man with the Golden Gun: Similar to Deathmatch except one of the weapons on the map is replaced by the Golden Gun, a single shot pistol which kills enemies in a single hit. Anybody who picks up the Golden Gun is marked on the radar, themselves receiving a reduced radar range, and are limited to a single armor pick-up as penalties. Each round the location of the Golden Gun is changed. Possession of the Golden Gun is not required for victory as the goal is to have the most kills when the time runs out.
- You Only Live Twice: Similar to Deathmatch except that during each round every player is limited to two respawns after being killed.
- Other Modes: Additional game modes include Dr. No Health, where the player spawns with zero health and full body armor, and can only replenish armor after earning a kill, and Dr. No Armor, where body armor is disabled entirely. Several other unique modes are actively being beta tested by the game's developers, or exist presently in the game as fan-made additions to the mod.

Many of the game modes are compatible with teamplay, which is usually enabled on the following round after a certain threshold of players in a server is passed. It can likewise be manually turned on and off by the server administrator.

== Development ==
Development of GoldenEye: Source began in 2005, led by founder Nicholas "Nickster" Bishop. The alpha version of the game was released on December 26, 2005. After years in beta the first official version was released on December 10, 2010. The team has continued to work on the mod to this day in dedication of Bishop's memory (Bishop died in 2006), with version 5.0 being released on August 12, 2016.

The 2016 version 5.0 went viral on social media shortly after launch, prompting several thousand new players to actively play the mod for several months. While activity in the game's servers died down over time, several hundred players who discovered the game from the 2016 release significantly expanded the previously existing community to maintain a consistently active playerbase that continues to persist as of 2024. According to the mod's developers, version 5.1 is currently in active development, which will feature tweaks to level design, sound and graphics improvements, and improved skins for some weapons, such as the AR33 assault rifle.

=== Level design ===
There are two fundamental types of level in GoldenEye: Source; "Classic" and "Neo". Classic maps are faithful re-creations of maps which existed in GoldenEye 007's multiplayer, which aim to be both to-scale as well as visually reminiscent of the simple level geometry the Nintendo 64 was capable of rendering, whilst using high resolution textures. Neo maps are re-imagined levels from GoldenEye 007 which often take visual inspiration from the film, as well as other James Bond films such as a map based on Casino Royale, from the film of the same name, recreating both multiplayer and a select number of viable singleplayer maps with layout changes that would otherwise be unsuitable for multiplayer gameplay. Most server administrators also include a selection of fan-made, GoldenEye-inspired maps, as well as maps ported from other first person shooter games, although the game's core official maps are by far the most commonly played. Maps based on the 2000 Nintendo 64 game Perfect Dark are also commonly played, although none are considered official.

=== Soundtrack ===
GoldenEye: Source features an extensive soundtrack by multiple contributing artists, of varying styles, and consisting of remixes of GoldenEye 007's soundtrack as well as original compositions. Primarily the soundtrack is composed by Trent "Basstronix" Robertson, Greg "Sole Signal" Michalec, Lynden "Tweaklab" Woodiwiss, all of whom create electronic and dance tracks, and Yannick "GoldenZen" Zenhäusern whose music mimics the orchestral and modern avant garde style of Éric Serra, the composer of GoldenEye's film score.

With each release of the mod, the soundtrack is released for free. Each level within the game has its own selection of songs which players can customize or add their own music to using .txt file scripts, including adding music from the original Nintendo 64 game to appear on specific maps.

== Reception ==
=== Awards ===
The mod received two awards in the 2006 Moddb awards, a win in Editor's Choice for the Reinvention category, and was player-voted 3rd place in the overall category Mod of the year, rising from their fourth-placed finish in the unreleased category of the 2005 awards.

In 2014 GoldenEye: Source was named by PC Gamer among the "Ten top fan remade classics you can play for free right now".
