= Space Squash =

1995 video game

- Developer: Tomcat System
- Publisher: Coconuts Japan Entertainment
- Platform: Virtual Boy
- Release: JP: September 29, 1995
- Genre: Sports
- Mode: Single-player

Space Squash (Note: Japanese: スペーススカッシュ, Hepburn: Supēsu Sukasshu) is a 1995 sports video game developed by Tomcat System and published by Coconuts Japan Entertainment in Japan for the Virtual Boy. The player assumes the role of a robot called Peatron to defeat a group of space pirates that have taken over the planet Animal Star on a intergalactic squash tournament. Its gameplay involves Peatron ricocheting a ball across a three-dimensional court and defeating the opponent on the other side in order to proceed further in the tournament.

Announced at E3 1995, Space Squash was one of four projects under development for the Virtual Boy by Coconuts Japan. The game was met with mixed reception from critics. The title has not been officially released outside Japan, although an English fan translation exists.

== Gameplay ==
Gameplay screenshot

Space Squash is a futuristic squash game played from a third-person perspective where the player assume the role of a robot called Peatron to defeat a group of space pirates that have taken over the planet Animal Star on a intergalactic squash tournament. Peatron begins at the area A-1 and each area in the game has six stages filled with opponents. A boss must be faced on every fifth area and finishing each area allows the player to play an extra bonus round, in addition of choosing the next route. The player controls Peatron with the left d-pad, while the right d-pad is used for directional ball shots. Points are won if the opponent misses the ball or his energy is reduced completely. If hit by the ball, an opponent is left stunned and open for scoring. The arena's wall can be used to obtain drifts with the ball. The player can use special power-ups, which are obtained by hitting boxes scattered in the arena, such as walls to protect Peatron's playing field, speed and health.

== Release ==
Space Squash was first announced at E3 1995 as one of the four projects under development by Coconuts Japan Entertainment for the Virtual Boy alongside Intercept, Proteus Zone and a 3D shooter. It was developed by Tomcat System. The game was published by Coconuts in Japan on September 29, 1995. The title was also showcased in a playable state at the 1995 Famimaga Earth World show. Although it was not officially released outside Japan, an English fan translation was released in 2015.

== Reception ==
Reception

Review scores
Publication	Score
Famitsu	4/10, 6/10, 6/10, 4/10
N64 Magazine	69%
Nintendo Life	8/10

Space Squash received a mixture of opinions from critics since its release. Famitsu's four reviewers gave the game an overall mixed outlook. Nintendo Magazine System noted that the title made decent use of the Virtual Boy's 3D effect but stated that it resembled tennis rather than squash. The Japanese book Virtual Boy Memorial Commemorative Guidebook gave it a negative outlook, noting its low difficulty level and unispired character designs but commended the arenas. In contrast, N64 Magazine's Jason Moore regarded it as a "very playable" game despite the concept, stating that its opponents offer considerable challenge. Nintendo Life's Dave Frear commended the use of the 3D effect, stage variety, controls, effective audio and hidden settings but remarked that an additional difficulty setting would have been a welcomed addition.
