= Reflections in a Golden Eye =

Reflections in a Golden Eye may refer to:

- Reflections in a Golden Eye (novel), a 1941 novel by Carson McCullers
- Reflections in a Golden Eye (film), a 1967 film adaptation directed by John Huston
