= Turn the Light On =

Studio album by Imminence
- Released: 3 May 2019
- Genre: Metalcore
- Length: 51:40
- Label: Arising Empire
- Producer: Imminence; Alias

Imminence chronology
This Is Goodbye (2017)	Turn the Light On (2019)	Heaven in Hiding (2021)

Singles from Turn the Light On
- 1. "Paralyzed" Released: 26 October 2018; 2. "Infectious" Released: 1 March 2019; 3. "Saturated Soul" Released: 5 April 2019; 4. "Lighthouse" Released: 26 April 2019; 5. "To the Light" Released: 16 October 2020

Turn the Light On is the third studio album by Swedish metalcore band Imminence. The album was released on 3 May 2019 through Arising Empire. It was self-produced by the band and Alias.

== Track listing ==
All tracks are written by Imminence.

Turn the Light On track listing
No.	Title	Length
1.	"Erase"	3:43
2.	"Paralyzed"	4:12
3.	"Room to Breathe"	3:56
4.	"Saturated Soul"	3:48
5.	"Infectious"	3:52
6.	"The Sickness" (new version)	4:03
7.	"Death of You"	3:27
8.	"Scars"	3:56
9.	"Disconnected"	3:47
10.	"Wake Me Up"	3:51
11.	"Don't Tell a Soul"	3:43
12.	"Lighthouse"	3:52
13.	"Love & Grace"	5:25
Total length:		51:40

Japanese edition bonus track
No.	Title	Length
12.	"To the Light"	3:38
Total length:		55:18

Deluxe edition bonus CD
No.	Title	Length
1.	"Paralyzed" (live in Studio Mega)	4:18
2.	"Saturated Soul" (live in Studio Mega)	3:52
3.	"Infectious" (live in Studio Mega)	3:50
4.	"Erase" (acoustic)	5:05
5.	"Saturated Soul" (acoustic)	4:36
6.	"Paralyzed" (acoustic)	4:16
7.	"Disconnected" (acoustic)	4:15
8.	"Infectious" (acoustic)	4:32
9.	"Hidden Track"	3:21
Total length:		38:05

Turn the Light On: Acoustic Reimagination
No.	Title	Length
1.	"Erase" (acoustic)	5:05
2.	"Saturated Soul" (acoustic)	4:36
3.	"Crawling" (acoustic; Linkin Park cover)	3:03
4.	"Disconnected" (acoustic)	4:15
5.	"Infectious" (acoustic)	4:32
6.	"A Mark on My Soul" (remastered; bonus track)	4:14
7.	"Wine & Water" (acoustic, remastered; bonus track)	3:26
8.	"This Is Goodbye" (acoustic, remastered; bonus track)	4:23
Total length:		33:36

== Personnel ==
Imminence

- Eddie Berg – lead vocals, violin, additional choir vocals, violin production
- Harald Barret – lead guitar, backing vocals, additional choir vocals
- Alex Arnoldsson – rhythm guitar, additional choir vocals
- Christian Höijer – bass, additional choir vocals
- Peter Hanström – drums, additional choir vocals

Technical

- Imminence – production
- Alias – production
- Christian Svedin – drum production
- Henrik Udd – mixing, mastering
- Jakob Koc – artwork
