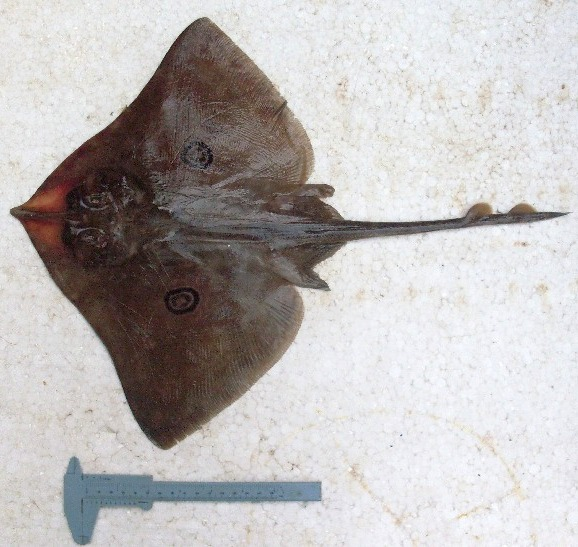

Conservation status
- Endangered (IUCN 3.1)

Scientific classification
- Kingdom: Animalia
- Phylum: Chordata
- Class: Chondrichthyes
- Subclass: Elasmobranchii
- Order: Rajiformes
- Family: Arhynchobatidae
- Genus: Atlantoraja
- Species: A. cyclophora

Binomial name
- Atlantoraja cyclophora (Regan, 1903)

= Eyespot skate =

Species of fish

The eyespot skate (Atlantoraja cyclophora) is a species of fish in the family Arhynchobatidae. It is found in Argentina, Brazil, and Uruguay. Its natural habitats are open seas and shallow seas.
