= Africa's Young Entrepreneurs =

Non-profit organisation in South Africa

Africa’s Young Entrepreneurs
- Founded: 2010
- Founder: Summy Smart Francis
- Type: Nonprofit organization
- Headquarters: Johannesburg, South Africa
- Region served: Africa
- Members: 12 million
- Key people: Summy Smart Francis (president); Ibada Ahmed (vice president); Folorunsho Alakija (chief matron); Asiwaju Bola Tinubu (chief patron)
- Website: ayeorganization.com

Africa's Young Entrepreneurs Organization (A.Y.E.) is the foremost entrepreneurship organization in Africa. A.Y.E unites entrepreneurs in Africa, by fostering social, intellectual, and financial connections thereby developing a network of African entrepreneurs who will shape the economic landscapes of their home countries.

A.Y.E is a non-profit organisation headquartered in Johannesburg, South Africa.

== AYESA ==
A.Y.E launched Africa's Young Entrepreneurs Student's Association (AYESA) in 2015. The organisation spent over $100,000 from internally generated revenue to research and launch AYESA. The inaugural conference of AYESA was held at the University of Lagos in December 2015. It presents young student entrepreneurs in need of experience, knowledge, mentorship and industry business skills with choice mentors from diverse business sectors in Africa.

== Economic Development Team ==
In 2015, A.Y.E launched an Economic Development Team as part of the effort to improve the economy of African countries. The team works with federal as well as state governments in Africa to improve the growth of the continent. The group also works to facilitate investment opportunity for global entrepreneurs and investors.

Africa's Young Entrepreneurs is the largest network of entrepreneurs in the world per The Guardian (Nigeria).
