= China Mobile Research Institute =

China Mobile Research Institute, the research division of China Mobile, was set up in 2002 with about 20 employees. To date (December 2013), it has more than 800 employees in its headquarters in Beijing. New branches of China Mobile Suzhou Research Institute and China Mobile Hangzhou Institute is under constructions.

== Notable research activities ==
- OPhone
- DSN
- C-RAN
- 6G
