= I (Imminence album) =

Studio album by Imminence
- Released: 9 September 2014
- Genre: Metalcore; post-hardcore
- Length: 43:26
- Label: We Are Triumphant
- Producer: Christian Svedin

Imminence chronology
Return to Helios (2013)	I (2014)	This Is Goodbye (2017)

Singles from I
- 1. "86" Released: 17 June 2014; 2. "The Seventh Seal" Released: 12 August 2014

I is the debut studio album by Swedish metalcore band Imminence. The album was released on 9 September 2014 through We Are Triumphant Records and was produced by Christian Svedin.

A 10th anniversary re-recording of the album, titled The Reclamation of I, was released on 20 December 2024.

== Critical reception ==
Professional ratings
Review scores
Source	Rating
New Transcendence	9/10

New Transcendence gave the album an almost perfect score 9/10 and saying: "In a word, Imminence are unique. Creative, crushing and catchy, they seamlessly stitch together the rough, warm cloth of metalcore with the smooth, thin silk of post-hardcore, making I a quilt that the listener will be anxious to wrap themselves in after a day in the freezing cold of monotonous metalcore."

== Track listing ==
All tracks are written by Imminence.

I track listing
No.	Title	Length
1.	"Proclaim"	3:40
2.	"86"	4:09
3.	"Every Breath"	4:16
4.	"Salt of the Earth"	4:02
5.	"Broken, Lost"	4:03
6.	"Du"	5:05
7.	"The Seventh Seal"	3:18
8.	"Those Who Seek"	5:28
9.	"Last Legs"	4:39
10.	"A Sense of Doubt"	4:41
Total length:		43:26

== Personnel ==
Imminence

- Eddie Berg – lead vocals, violin, choir, art direction, illustration
- Harald Barret – lead guitar, backing vocals
- Alex Arnoldsson – rhythm guitar, piano recording
- Fredrik Rosdahl – bass
- Peter Hanström – drums

Additional musicians

- Niklas Johansson – cello
- Ravn Hansen – piano

Additional personnel

- Christian Svedin – production, mixing, mastering, recording
- Jakob Koc – design
- Caroline Wallberg – logo
