= Eye (disambiguation) =

An eye is an organ of vision.

Eye, The Eye, EYE or 3YE may also refer to:

== People ==
- Ay (pharaoh), also spelled Eye (fl. c. 1327 – c. 1319 BC), the penultimate pharaoh of ancient Egypt's 18th dynasty
- Eye-D (born 1974), a Dutch drum & bass producer and DJ based in Goes, the Netherlands
- Jessica Eye, an American mixed martial artist
- Yamantaka Eye (born 1964), a Japanese musician and artist

== Places ==
=== England ===
- Eye, Cambridgeshire, a village in Peterborough
- Eye, Herefordshire
- Eye, Suffolk
  - Eye (UK Parliament constituency)
- Eia, also known as Eye, a former medieval manor that is now part of Central London
- Eye Brook, Rutland
- Eye Green, Peterborough
- River Eye, Gloucestershire
- River Eye, Leicestershire
- London Eye, an observation wheel and tourist attraction

=== Scotland ===
- Eye Peninsula
- Eye Water, a river

=== Elsewhere ===
- Eagle Creek Airpark (ITA code:EYE), an airport in Indianapolis, Indiana, United States
- Tianjin Binhai Library, also known as "The Eye", Tianjin, China

== Art, entertainment, and media ==
=== Fictional entities ===
- Brother Eye, a DC Comics character who is part of the OMAC Project
- Eye (Centaur Publications), a giant, floating disembodied eye, in a halo of golden light
- The Eye of Sauron, a form taken by Sauron in The Lord of the Rings

=== Film ===
- EYE Film Institute Netherlands
- The Eye (2002 film), a Hong Kong horror film
- The Eye 2, a 2004 sequel film
- The Eye 10 or The Eye 3 or The Eye Infinity, a 2005 sequel film
- The Eye 3D or The Child's Eye, a 2010 sequel film
- The Eye (2008 film), an American remake starring Jessica Alba

=== Games ===
- E.Y.E.: Divine Cybermancy, a 2011 video game
- Eyes, a key concept in the game of Go
- PlayStation Eye, an EyeToy like peripheral for the PlayStation 3
- Queen: The eYe, a 1998 video game featuring music by the rock group Queen
- The Eye: A mysterious quantum cosmic body in the 2019 video game Outer Wilds by Mobius Digital

=== Literature ===
- Eye (short story collection), a 1985 Frank Herbert short story collection
- The Eye (novel) (Russian: Sogliadatai), a 1930 novel by Vladimir Nabokov

=== Music ===
==== Bands ====
- 3YE, South Korean girl group

==== Albums ====
- Eye (Robyn Hitchcock album), by Robyn Hitchcock
- Eye (Sekai no Owari album), by Sekai no Owari
- The Eye (King Diamond album), a 1990 heavy metal concept album
- The Eye (KUKL album), a 1984 post-punk album
- The Eye (Yello album), a 2003 electronica album

==== Songs ====
- "Eye" (song), by the Smashing Pumpkins; featured on the Lost Highway soundtrack
- "The Eye", a song by Brandi Carlile from her album The Firewatcher's Daughter
- "The Eye", a song by Infinite from their extended play Infinite Only
- "Eye", a song by Madvillain from his album Madvillainy
- "Eye", a song by Neurosis from their album Through Silver in Blood
- "Eye", a song by Pitchshifter from their album Industrial
- "The 'Eye", a song by Squarepusher from his album Selection Sixteen

=== Periodicals ===
- Eye (journal), a scientific journal published by the Royal College of Ophthalmologists
- Eye (magazine), the International Review of Graphic Design
- Eye Weekly, a Toronto-based publication
- Eye Magazine, published by the Hearst Corporation, 1968–69, with articles on youth culture

=== Television ===
- "The Eye" (Andor)
- "The Eye" (The Brak Show), a 2001 episode
- "The Eye" (The Lord of the Rings: The Rings of Power), an episode of the first season of The Lord of the Rings: The Rings of Power
- "The Eye" (Stargate Atlantis), a 2004 episode
- CBS Broadcasting Inc., nicknamed "The Eye" based on the network's logo
- The eye logo used for the Brazilian television network Band
- Channel Eye, a Sri Lankan television channel

=== Radio ===
- The Eye (radio station), a community radio station in England
- Eye Radio, a radio station in South Sudan

=== Other arts ===
- Eye (Alexander McQueen collection), a fashion collection from 2000
- Eye (sculpture), a public sculpture in Dallas, Texas

== Religion ==
- Eye of Horus, an Egyptian symbol related to the deity Horus
- Eye of Ra, a being in Egyptian mythology
- Third eye, a mystical or esoteric concept

== Other uses ==
- Eye (cyclone), the center of a tropical cyclone
- Eye pattern, also known as an eye diagram, an oscilloscope display of a digital data signal
- Eye of Providence, a symbol depicting an eye within a triangle
- European Youth Event, an event in European Parliament
- The loop of an eye bolt
- The result of an eye splice
- Eyes (cheese), round holes in cheese
- The pronunciation of the letter I

== See also ==
- AY (disambiguation)
- Aye (disambiguation)
- Eyes (disambiguation)
- Eyespot (disambiguation)
- I (disambiguation)
