= GoldenEye 007 =

1997 video game

- North American box art featuring Pierce Brosnan as James Bond 007 (top center and bottom) and Izabella Scorupco as Natalya Simonova (left)
- Developer: Rare (Note: Xbox release developed by Code Mystics)
- Publisher: Nintendo (Note: Xbox release published by Xbox Game Studios)
- Director: Martin Hollis
- Producer: Martin Hollis
- Designers: Duncan Botwood; David Doak
- Programmers: Mark Edmonds; Steve Ellis
- Artists: Karl Hilton; Adrian Smith; Brett Jones
- Writer: David Doak
- Composers: Graeme Norgate; Grant Kirkhope; Robin Beanland
- Series: James Bond
- Platform: Nintendo 64
- Release: JP: 23 August 1997; NA: 25 August 1997; UK: 7 November 1997
- Genre: First-person shooter
- Modes: Single-player, multiplayer

GoldenEye 007 is a 1997 first-person shooter game developed by Rare and published by Nintendo for the Nintendo 64. It is based on the 1995 James Bond film GoldenEye, with the player controlling the secret agent James Bond to prevent a criminal syndicate from using a satellite weapon. They navigate a series of levels to complete objectives, such as recovering or destroying objects, while shooting enemies. In a multiplayer mode, up to four players compete in several deathmatch scenarios via split-screen.

Development began in January 1995. An inexperienced team led by Martin Hollis developed GoldenEye 007 over two and a half years. The game was conceived as a side-scrolling platform game for the Super Nintendo Entertainment System, but evolved into a 3D shooter for the Nintendo 64 inspired by Doom (1993) and Virtua Cop (1994). Rare visited the GoldenEye set for reference, and Eon Productions and Metro-Goldwyn-Mayer (MGM) allowed them to expand the game with sequences and characters not featured in the film.

GoldenEye 007 was released in Japan on 23 August 1997, North America on 25 August 1997, and the United Kingdom on 7 November 1997, two years after the release of the film but shortly before the release of its sequel Tomorrow Never Dies. It faced low expectations from the gaming media during development. However, it received critical acclaim and sold over eight million copies, making it the third-best-selling Nintendo 64 game. The game was praised for its visuals, gameplay depth and variety, and multiplayer mode. In 1998, it received the BAFTA Interactive Entertainment Award, as well as four awards from the Academy of Interactive Arts & Sciences.

GoldenEye 007 demonstrated the viability of home consoles as platforms for first-person shooters and signalled a transition from Doom-like shooters to a more grounded style. It pioneered features such as atmospheric single-player missions, widescreen gaming, stealth elements, and console multiplayer deathmatch. The game is considered to be one of the most influential and greatest video games ever made, with many of its elements, such as the Klobb gun, leaving an enduring impression in video game culture. A spiritual successor, Perfect Dark, was released in 2000, while a remake developed by Eurocom, also titled GoldenEye 007, was released in 2010. The original game was rereleased in January 2023 on Xbox One and Xbox Series X/S via Xbox Game Pass and Nintendo Switch via the Nintendo Classics service.

== Gameplay ==
When the player takes damage, red and blue bars are displayed on the game's HUD, representing Bond's health and armour levels respectively. Ammunition information is displayed at the bottom right corner.

GoldenEye 007 is a first-person shooter in which the player takes the role of Secret Intelligence Service agent James Bond through a series of levels. In each level, the player must complete a set of objectives while computer-controlled opponents try to hinder the player's progress. Objectives range from recovering items to destroying objects, defeating enemies, or rescuing hostages. Some objectives may also require the player to use high-tech gadgets. For example, in one level, the player must use Bond's electromagnetic watch to acquire a jail cell key. Although the player begins each level with a limited amount of supplies, additional weapons and ammunition can be acquired from defeated enemies. There are no health-recovery items, but body armour can be acquired to provide a secondary health bar.

The game features more than 20 weapons, including pistols, submachine guns, assault rifles, a sniper rifle, grenades, and throwing knives. Most weapons have a finite magazine and must be reloaded after a certain number of shots. Although each weapon has its own characteristics, ammunition is interchangeable between some weapon types. For example, pistols and submachine guns share the same ammunition. Weapons inflict different levels of damage depending on which body part they hit. Head shots cause the most damage, while arm and leg shots inflict the least damage. The Klobb, a submachine gun with a folding stock, possesses a high rate of fire and a wide bullet spread compared to other weapons, but is severely underpowered with a heavy recoil. The Klobb can be dual-wielded for additional firepower. Stealth is often encouraged, as frequent gunfire can alert distant guards, and alarms can spawn enemies. Certain weapons incorporate a suppressor or a telescopic sight to aid the player in killing enemies discreetly.

Each level can be played on three difficulty settings: Agent, Secret Agent, and 00 Agent. These affect aspects such as the damage enemies can withstand and inflict, the amount of ammunition available, and the number of objectives that must be completed. Two bonus levels can be unlocked by completing the game on Secret Agent and then on 00 Agent. The player may also replay previously completed levels within target times to unlock bonus cheat options such as infinite ammunition or invincibility. Upon completing the game on the three difficulty settings, an additional mode is unlocked, allowing the player to customise the difficulty of a level by manually adjusting enemies' health, reaction times, aiming accuracy, and the damage they inflict.

=== Multiplayer ===
GoldenEye 007 features a multiplayer mode where up to four players can compete in several deathmatch scenarios via split-screen. These include Normal, You Only Live Twice, The Living Daylights, The Man With the Golden Gun, and Licence to Kill. Normal is a standard mode where players score points by killing opponents. Players can be grouped in teams or compete individually. You Only Live Twice gives players two lives before they are eliminated from the game, resulting in the last surviving player winning the match. In Licence to Kill, players die from a single hit with any weapon. Due to its high rate of fire and wide bullet spread, the Klobb is highly advantageous in this scenario.

In The Man With the Golden Gun, a single Golden Gun, which is capable of killing opponents with one shot, is placed in a fixed location in the level. Once the Golden Gun is picked up, the only way to re-acquire it is by killing the player holding it. In The Living Daylights, a flag is placed in a fixed location in the level, and the player who holds it the longest wins. The flag carrier cannot use weapons but can collect them to keep opponents from stocking ammunition. Options such as the chosen level, characters to play as, weapons available, and game length can be customised for each scenario. Additional levels and characters can be unlocked as the player progresses through the single-player game.

== Plot ==
In 1986 Arkhangelsk, Soviet Union, MI6 has uncovered a secret chemical weapons facility at the Byelomorye Dam. James Bond and fellow 00-agent Alec Trevelyan are sent to infiltrate the facility and plant explosive charges. During the mission, Trevelyan is shot by General Arkady Ourumov, while Bond escapes by commandeering an aeroplane.

Five years later in 1991, Bond is sent to investigate a satellite control station in Severnaya, Russia, where programmer Boris Grishenko works. In 1993, Bond investigates an unscheduled test firing of a missile in Kyrgyzstan, believed to be a cover for the launch of a satellite known as GoldenEye. This space-based weapon works by firing a concentrated electromagnetic pulse (EMP) at any Earth target to disable any electrical circuit within range. As Bond leaves the silo, he is ambushed by Ourumov and a squad of Russian troops. Ourumov manages to escape during the encounter.

In 1995, Bond visits Monte Carlo to investigate the frigate La Fayette, where he rescues several hostages and plants a tracker bug on the Pirate helicopter before it is stolen by the Janus crime syndicate. Bond is then sent a second time to Severnaya, but during the mission, he is captured and locked up in the bunker's cells along with Natalya Simonova, a captive computer programmer unwilling to work with Janus. They both escape the complex seconds before it is destroyed—on the orders of Ourumov—by the GoldenEye satellite's EMP. Bond next travels to Saint Petersburg, where he arranges with ex-KGB agent Valentin Zukovsky to meet the chief of the Janus organisation. This is revealed to be Alec Trevelyan—his execution by Ourumov in the Arkhangelsk facility was faked.

Bond and Natalya escape from Trevelyan, but are arrested by the Russian police and taken to the military archives for interrogation. Eventually, Bond escapes the interrogation room, rescues Natalya, and communicates with Defence Minister Dimitri Mishkin, who has verified Bond's claim of Ourumov's treachery. Natalya is recaptured by General Ourumov, and Bond gives chase through the streets of St. Petersburg, eventually reaching an arms depot used by Janus. There, Bond destroys its weaponry stores and then hitches a ride on Trevelyan's ex-Soviet missile train, where he kills Ourumov and rescues Natalya. However, Alec Trevelyan and his ally Xenia Onatopp escape to their secret base in Cuba.

Natalya accompanies Bond to the Caribbean. Surveying the Cuban jungle aerially, their light aircraft is shot down. Unscathed, Bond and Natalya perform a ground search of the area's heavily guarded jungle terrain but are ambushed by Xenia, who is quickly killed by Bond. Bond sneaks Natalya into the control centre to disrupt transmissions to the GoldenEye satellite and force it to burn up in the Earth's atmosphere. He then follows the fleeing Trevelyan through a series of flooded caverns, eventually arriving at the antenna of the control centre's radio telescope. Trevelyan attempts to re-align it in a final attempt to restore contact with the GoldenEye, but Bond destroys machinery vital to controlling the antenna and defeats Trevelyan in a gunfight on a platform above the dish.

== Development ==
=== Design ===

The geometry of some of the structures in the film (top) was recreated in the game (bottom).

GoldenEye 007 was developed by the British studio Rare and directed by Martin Hollis, who had previously worked as a second programmer on the coin-op version of Killer Instinct. In November 1994, after Nintendo and Rare discussed the possibility of developing a game based on the upcoming James Bond film GoldenEye, Hollis told Tim Stamper, Rare's managing director, that he was interested in the project. Due to the success of Rare's 1994 game Donkey Kong Country, GoldenEye 007 was originally suggested as a 2D platformer for the Super Nintendo Entertainment System. However, Hollis proposed a 3D shooting game for the upcoming Nintendo 64 console. He created a document with design ideas, including gadgets, weapons, characters, story digression from the film, and artificial intelligence (AI) that would react to the player.

Rare named Sega's 1994 light gun shooter Virtua Cop, id Software's seminal 1993 first-person shooter Doom and the Nintendo 64 launch game Super Mario 64 as influences. Features such as gun reloading, position-dependent hit reaction animations, penalties for killing innocent characters, and the aiming system that is activated with the R button of the Nintendo 64 controller were adopted from Virtua Cop. The developers considered having players reload weapons by unplugging and re-inserting the Rumble Pak on the controller, but Nintendo opposed the idea. The concept of several varied objectives within each mission was inspired by the multiple tasks in each stage of Super Mario 64.

The team visited the studios of the GoldenEye film several times to collect photographs and blueprints of the sets. Eon Productions and MGM, the companies that control the James Bond films, granted the team a broad licence, and many levels were extended or modified to allow the player to participate in sequences not seen in the film. Although the reference material was used for authenticity, the team was not afraid to add to it to help the game design. John Woo films such as Hard Boiled influenced the visual effects and kinetic moments. Details such as bullet marks on walls, cartridge cases being ejected from guns, and objects exploding were part of the design. Hollis wanted players to receive a lot of feedback from the environment when they shot.

The team considered implementing both on-rails and free-roaming modes because they did not know how the Nintendo 64 controller would work, and the game's gas plant location was modelled with a predetermined path in mind. A modified Sega Saturn controller was used for some early playtesting. The designers' initial priority was purely on the creation of interesting spaces; level design and balance considerations such as the placement of start and exit points, characters and objectives did not begin until this process was complete. According to Hollis, this unplanned approach gave many levels a realistic and non-linear feel, with several rooms having no direct relevance to a level. After completing the levels, the developers modelled around 40 James Bond gadgets that had been depicted in the films and attempted to find uses for them in each level.

=== Production ===
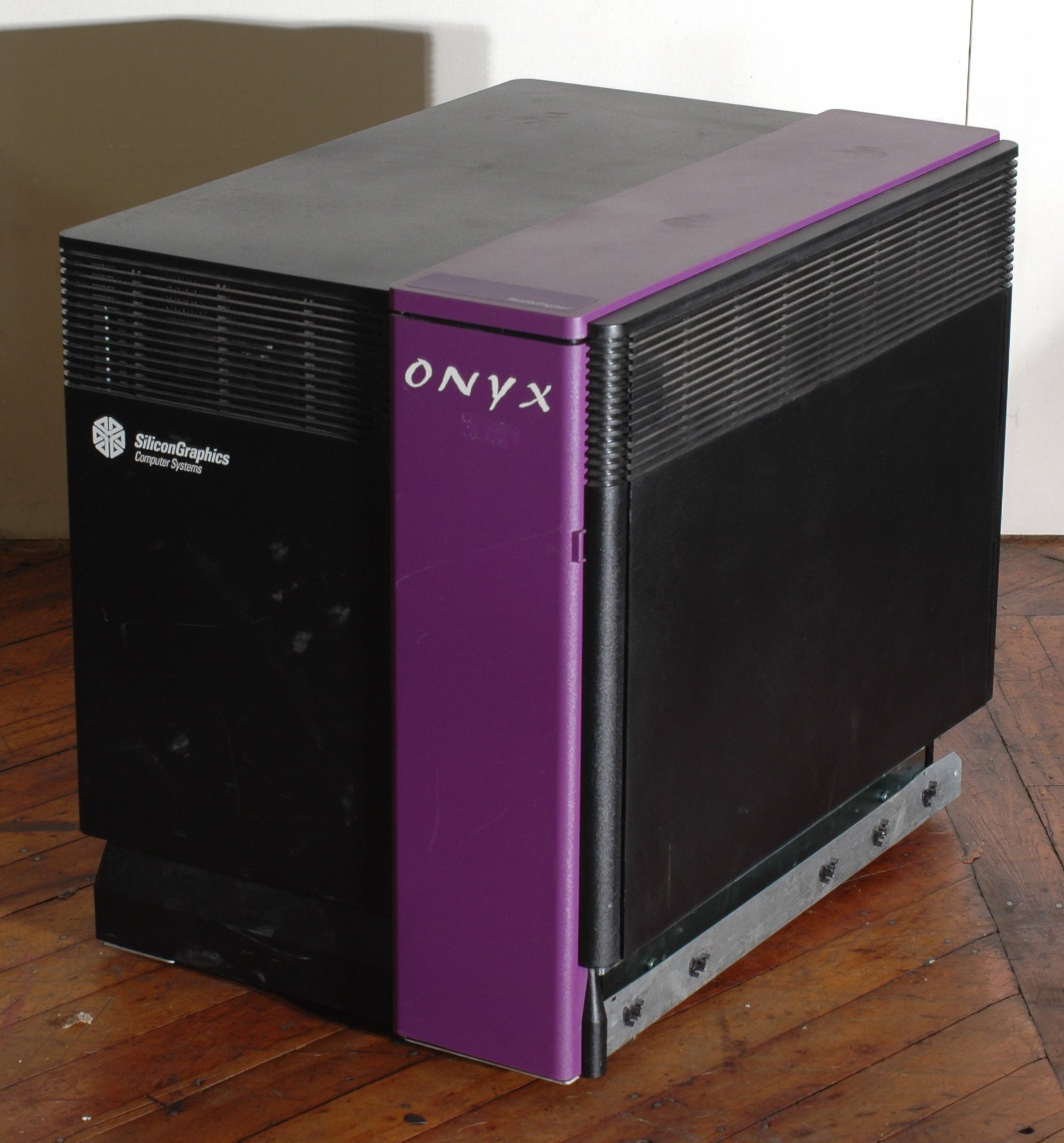
An SGI Onyx graphics workstation was used during the first stages of development.

Work on GoldenEye 007 began in January 1995 with a team hired by Hollis: programmer Mark Edmonds, background artist Karl Hilton, and character artist B. Jones. Edmonds focused on creating a game engine that could render 3D graphics from art packages into Nintendo 64 data structures. Hilton modelled levels based on the film material, while Jones constructed characters based on photos and costumes they had. Since final Nintendo 64 specifications and development kits were not initially available to Rare, the team had to estimate the finalised console's capabilities using an SGI Onyx workstation and Nintendo's custom NINGEN development software. In the following months, designer Duncan Botwood joined the team to construct the levels. The first year was spent producing art assets and developing the engine, which originally only allowed the player and enemies to move around a virtual environment.

After the first year of development, Rare added more staff to the project. The first addition was designer David Doak, who helped with the level designs and worked on the AI scripting. He explained how the stealth elements were implemented: "Whenever you fired a gun, it had a radius test and alerted the non-player characters within that radius. If you fired the same gun again within a certain amount of time, it did a larger radius test and I think there was a third even larger radius after that. It meant if you found one guy and shot him in the head and then didn't fire again, the timer would reset." Windows throughout the game were programmed so that enemies cannot see through them. Though unrealistic, this encouraged the player to use windows to spy on enemies.

Hollis hired a second programmer, Steve Ellis, six months later. Although Ellis assisted the development team in many areas and programmed the cheat options, he was mostly responsible for implementing the multiplayer mode, which was added roughly six months before release. According to Doak, Ellis "sat in a room with all the code written for a single-player game and turned GoldenEye into a multiplayer game." The team spent numerous late evenings playtesting it. The multiplayer levels are based on single-player missions and some of them do not support four players because they were initially not designed to handle multiplayer action. A firing range was modelled as an environment, but was not added.

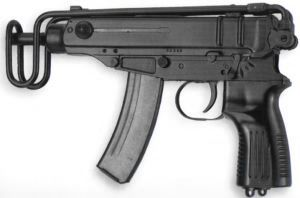
A variant of the Škorpion, which inspired the visual design of the Klobb

Because the team assumed they could use anything from the James Bond universe, the multiplayer mode features characters that appear in previous Bond films. Actors who portrayed Bond in previous films were playable during development, but were removed because Rare was unable to get Sean Connery's permission to use his likeness. However, the player select screen with the actors' likenesses was left in the game, though it is only accessible with cheat devices. Despite their fictional names, most weapons were modelled after real-world firearms such as the Walther PPK, the AK-74, and the FN P90. The Klobb was inspired by the Škorpion, a Czechoslovak submachine gun with a folding stock. Its name was chosen to honor Ken Lobb, who was Rare's Nintendo-side producer and contact at the time. Another weapon, the DD44 Dostovei (modeled after Tokarev pistol), was named after Doak's initials. Adrian Smith, the game's third and last artist, who had already worked on some games at Rare, was in charge of producing visual effects such as muzzle flashes and explosions. He mentioned the 1995 film Heat as an influence.

The final Nintendo 64 hardware could render polygons faster than the SGI Onyx workstation the development team had been using. This helped the developers significantly, as some backgrounds rendered at 2 frames per second on the Onyx without even drawing enemies, objects, or Bond's gun. However, the textures had to be cut down by half. Hilton explained one method of improving performance: "A lot of GoldenEye is in black and white. RGB colour textures cost a lot more in terms of processing power. You could do double the resolution if you used greyscale, so a lot was done like that. If I needed a bit of colour, I'd add it in the vertex." When Super Mario 64 was released in 1996, the 3D collision detection system was influential for Hollis because GoldenEye 007 was originally using a 2D method.

The music was primarily composed by Graeme Norgate and Grant Kirkhope. Norgate previously penned the music of Blast Corps, while Kirkhope composed the music of Donkey Kong Land 2. Robin Beanland, the game's third composer, only wrote the elevator music that can be heard in certain levels. All the sound effects were created by Norgate and a lot of effort was put into combining and permuting sounds in different ways to create a satisfying feel. According to Hollis, whenever the player shoots a gun, up to nine different sound effects will randomly trigger. When the game was reviewed by Nintendo shortly before it was released, the company was slightly concerned about the amount of violence and gunplay. As a result, the team toned down the killing and added an end credits sequence that introduces all the non-player characters, giving the game a filmic sense. The game received a Teen rating from the Entertainment Software Rating Board.

GoldenEye 007 was first released in Japan on 23 August 1997. It was later released in English on a 96-megabit cartridge on 25 August 1997. Although this was over a year and a half after the release of the GoldenEye film, the game benefited from publicity for the upcoming James Bond film Tomorrow Never Dies. Every cartridge of the game contains a ZX Spectrum emulator with ten Rare developed games. This function was originally made as an experimental side project by Rare and was deactivated in the final version, but has since been unlocked through fan-made patches. The development of GoldenEye 007 took more than two and a half years to complete and had a budget of US$2 million.

== Reception ==
Reception

Aggregate score
Aggregator	Score
Metacritic	96/100

Review scores
Publication	Score
Edge	9/10
Electronic Gaming Monthly	9.5/10, 9.5/10, 9.5/10, 9/10 (Note: Each of the four reviewers in Electronic Gaming Monthly scored the game on a ten point scale.)
Famitsu	7/10, 8/10, 8/10, 8/10
Game Informer	8.5/10
GameRevolution	A−
GameSpot	9.8/10
IGN	9.7/10
N64 Magazine	94%
Next Generation	5/5
Nintendo Power	9/10
Gaming Age	9.1/10

Despite low expectations among the gaming media and an unsuccessful showing at the Electronic Entertainment Expo in Atlanta in 1997, GoldenEye 007 received widespread acclaim from critics and was a commercial success. In its first month of release in the United States, it was the second best-selling home console video game by unit sales (behind Star Fox 64), and remained within the top five best-selling video games for the remainder of 1997. For the entirety of 1998, the game stayed within the top ten best-selling video games in the United States, selling approximately 2.1 million copies. In 1999, it stayed within the top 20 best-selling video game chart up to July. By 2001, it had sold over seven million copies worldwide. Overall, GoldenEye 007 sold more than eight million units worldwide, making it the third-best-selling Nintendo 64 game, behind Super Mario 64 and Mario Kart 64. According to a paper published on the website of the Entertainment Software Association, the game grossed $250 million worldwide, more than 70% of the movie's box office despite having only 3.3% of the movie's budget.

Prior to its release in English, the game was reviewed in Japanese magazine Famitsu. Two reviewers complimented it as being like a superior version of Doom with reviewers complimenting that its story and themes were superior, as well as it having high quality sound and feedback with the Rumble Pak. One reviewer found the mission objections were not always clear while a second player said they felt more like Rambo than a spy while playing.

Graphically, GoldenEye 007 was praised for its varied and detailed environments, realistic animations, and special effects such as glass transparencies and lingering smoke. Nintendo Power said the frame rate in multiplayer games was high, while Electronic Gaming Monthly described it as somewhat choppy and sluggish. The zoomable sniper rifle was praised as one of the most impressive and entertaining features, with Edge describing it as a "novel twist" and Jeff Gerstmann of GameSpot noting its ability to alleviate the distance fog. The music was praised for its inclusion of the "James Bond Theme" and for adding ambience. Some levels begin in lifts and feature transitions from elevator music to full soundtracks, which Gerstmann cited as an illustration of the attention to detail.

The gameplay was highlighted for its depth and requiring more stealth and intelligence than earlier first-person shooters. IGN's Doug Perry called GoldenEye 007 an immersive game which "blends smart strategy gameplay with fast-action gunmanship". Similarly, Greg Sewart of Gaming Age remarked that players have "a bit of freedom as to what they want to do in any given situation, and what order the directives are completed in". Reviewers also enjoyed the wide variety of weapons and the multi-objective-based missions, stating that they kept the game fresh. The controls were praised for being more intuitive than Acclaim's earlier well-received Nintendo 64 first-person shooter Turok: Dinosaur Hunter, though some found the cursor targeting difficult to master. GameRevolution credited the gameplay for being realistic and different from other shooters, but also criticised the campaign for being badly paced. The publication noted that GoldenEye 007 "takes it for granted that you have already seen the movie" and that players may get stuck due to the game's lack of orientation.

At the time, GoldenEye 007 was considered the best multiplayer game on the system, "edging Mario Kart 64 by a hair" according to IGN. Edge called it addictive and praised the originality of some of the scenarios such as You Only Live Twice. GamePro said the multiplayer modes "will have you shooting your friends for the rest of the year", while Next Generation highlighted the number of multiplayer options, calling GoldenEye 007 "a surprising killer app, if only for the smashing multiplayer options. The excellent single-player game backing it up makes it well worth buying indeed." The game was also hailed for its accurate and detailed adaptation of the film, with GamePro going so far as to call it "one of the best movie-to-game translations ever". The ability to use numerous signature Bond gadgets and weapons was considered a particularly strong element in this regard. Crispin Boyer of Electronic Gaming Monthly stated that Rare "has packed everything that's cool about 007 into this game."

GoldenEye 007 received multiple year-end awards, including the BAFTA Interactive Entertainment Award in 1998, and four awards from the inaugural AIAS Interactive Achievement Awards: "Interactive Title of the Year", "Console Game of the Year", "Console Action Game of the Year", and "Outstanding Achievement in Software Engineering"; it also received nominations for "Outstanding Achievement in Art/Graphics" and "Outstanding Achievement in Interactive Design". Electronic Gaming Monthly named it both Most Addictive Game and Best Movie to Game in their 1998 Video Game Buyer's Guide, and Game of the Year in their Editor's Choice Awards. Rare won the BAFTA award for Best UK Developer.

== Legacy ==
=== Retrospective appraisal ===
GoldenEye 007 has been credited for proving that it is possible to create a "fun" first-person shooter experience on a home console in both single-player and multiplayer modes—when the game was released, the first-person shooter genre was primarily for PC games. The game opened the genre to the console market, and it has been credited for paving the way for the popularity of Halo and Call of Duty. The game's introduction of a multiplayer deathmatch mode on a console is often credited for having revolutionised the genre, with Edge stating that it set the standard for multiplayer console combat until it was surpassed by Halo: Combat Evolved in 2001. GoldenEye 007 also introduced stealth elements that were unprecedented in first-person shooters. The game's use of realistic gameplay, which contrasted with the approaches taken by Doom clones, and its context-sensitive hit locations on enemies added a realism that was previously unseen in video games, although the 1996 Team Fortress computer mod for Quake had previously introduced headshots. Alongside Shiny Entertainment's 1997 third-person shooter MDK, GoldenEye 007 has been credited with pioneering and popularising the now-standard inclusion of scoped sniper rifles in video games. The game's mission design, enemy AI, and stealth gameplay influenced contemporary titles such as Half-Life, Thief: The Dark Project, Syphon Filter, and Deus Ex.

GoldenEye 007 is frequently cited as one of the greatest video games of all time. Shortly after its release in 1997, Electronic Gaming Monthly ranked GoldenEye 007 the 25th-best console video game of all time, calling it "easily the best movie game, and, more importantly, the best first-person game ever." In 1999, Next Generation editors placed GoldenEye 007 at No. 10 on their list of Top 50 Games of All Time, commenting, "Marrying Doom-style shooting with trademark Bond missions, GoldenEye is the perfect thinking-man's shooter." In 2000, Computer and Video Games readers ranked GoldenEye 007 first place in the magazine's poll of 100 Greatest Games of All Time, and fifth in a similar poll the following year. In 2001, Game Informer ranked the game 16th on its list of Top 100 Games of All Time. In 2004, Retro Gamer readers voted GoldenEye 007 as the 33rd-greatest retro game, with editors calling it "easily the best Bond game to date." In 2005, IGN editors ranked the game 29th on their list of Top 100 Games of All Time, while readers placed it at seventh on a separate list. In 2009, Official Nintendo Magazine ranked the game 55th on a list of greatest Nintendo games.

Edge has featured GoldenEye 007 prominently in several "greatest game" lists. The game was ranked third in a staff-voted poll in 2000, was included as one of the publication's top ten shooters in 2003, and was placed at No. 17 in a staff, reader, and gaming industry-voted poll in 2007. Although Edge awarded GoldenEye 007 a score of 9 out of 10 upon its release, the publication acknowledged in 2013 that the game should have received the highest score. With its eight million copies sold, GoldenEye 007 was a significant contributor in helping the Nintendo 64 remain competitive against the PlayStation, although Nintendo ultimately lost much of the market share. GamePro called GoldenEye 007 the console killer app of the 1990s and the greatest licensed game from a film of all time, while Nintendo Power considered the multiplayer mode one of the greatest multiplayer experiences in Nintendo history.

In a retrospective analysis, Nintendo Life editor Mark Reece gave GoldenEye 007 eight out of ten, stating that although the multiplayer mode stands up well, its graphics, audio and "fiddly" aiming system are dated. He noted that GoldenEye 007's approach to difficulty settings provides considerable replay value, but is a system rarely used in modern first-person shooters. Writing for NME on the game's 20th anniversary, journalist Mark Beaumont highlighted the immersive graphics, aesthetic, location-based damage on enemies, and revolutionary multiplayer mode, stating that it "helped to introduce gaming as a group event".

In 2011, the game was selected as one of 80 games from the past 40 years to be placed in the Art of Video Games exhibit in the Smithsonian American Art Museum in Washington, D.C.

In its 2023 ranking of every North American N64 game, Hard Drive called GoldenEye the best title on the console, saying it was "an inarguably era-defining game that not only established the gold standard of the day for the burgeoning FPS genre, but also opened the floodgates for nearly a decade of z-grade shooters adapted from blockbuster IPs, all made in a limp, flagrant attempt to replicate its success." The site said that "the most enduring testament to [the game's] legacy is how it's grown to overshadow the movie it's based on."

In 2025, The Strong National Museum of Play inducted GoldenEye 007 into its World Video Game Hall of Fame. Andrew Borman of The Strong Museum said "Critics lauded GoldenEye 007 as the premier example of a first-person shooter to succeed on a console rather than a PC, and it is still considered one of the best multiplayer experiences ever produced on a Nintendo system."

=== The Klobb ===
During development, this weapon was called the Skorpion VZ/61 after its real-world counterpart but was changed due to legal reasons. The weapon was renamed the "Spyder" but had to be changed again for legal reasons, as the name itself is trademarked by a paintball manufacturer of the same name, before finally being renamed as the Klobb, in reference to Ken Lobb, Rare's Nintendo-side producer and contact at the time. That notwithstanding, the weapon still appears in the game's instruction manual as the "Spyder".

The Klobb has been retrospectively described by critics as a memorable aspect of the gameplay of GoldenEye 007, albeit for its negative traits; despite its high rate of fire, it deals a low amount of damage and is extremely inaccurate. In a contemporaneous review, Edge remarked that the ability to dual-wield the Klobb is one of the most satisfying moments, and argued that it is likely to be remembered by players unlike the vast majority of video game weapons. In their view, imperfection adds both realism and unpredictability to a game, and that the moments created by this were something that designers were beginning to realize were just as valuable as creating a "perfect" weapon. Simon Parkin of Eurogamer noted the naming of the Klobb as one of the first times that issues arose over using real-life gun names for in-game weapons, as GoldenEye 007 was one of the first console games to feature 3D firearms. Parkin noted that while the invented gun names were "acceptable in the fictional universe of James Bond", he emphasized that "for those games based around real armed forces, the inclusion of brand names was necessary to remain faithful to the source material." The gun was included in the video game Too Human as "KLOBB", due to Ken Lobb's association with the game's developers, Silicon Knights.

The weapon has also been referenced in other games as well. In Perfect Dark, the KL01313 is one of the "Classic Weapons" featured as a duplicate of the Klobb with its numbers "01313" spelling the name "KLOBB". In the HD remaster GoldenEye 007: Reloaded and the later release 007 Legends, the Kl-033 Mk2 is a submachine gun classified under the Special category. The name is an obvious reference to the original Klobb. The weapon's name also follows a similar naming convention to the one in Perfect Dark with the 0 as an O and the 3 as a B with it being identified as Mark 2, supposedly as in improvement over the original GoldenEye version. It is also referenced in State of Decay, where the description for the Skorpion gives "Klobb" as a nickname for the weapon amongst Network operatives, who favor the gun. In Syphon Filter 3, a Skorpion appears as the "Spyder Skorpion", as a nod to the Klobb's early pseudonym. It is depicted as firing high-impact rounds that deal heavy damage to targets, as opposed to the weak and underpowered Klobb.

=== Rerelease ===
An Xbox Live Arcade (XBLA) remaster was in development at Rare and 4J Studios for several months in 2008. The remaster was set to add several new features, including online multiplayer and the ability to toggle between the original and updated graphics. Though it reportedly needed only two more months of development before it was finished, the remaster was cancelled because Nintendo, MGM, and Microsoft, which acquired Rare in 2002, were unable to come to a licensing agreement. According to Rare's Ross Bury, Mark Edmonds, and Chris Tilston, Rare began developing the remaster in late 2006, shortly after the Stamper brothers had left Rare and after the company had completed Perfect Dark Zero and Kameo. Microsoft had suggested that GoldenEye 007 would be appropriate for XBLA, leading Rare to start on the remaster prior to getting Nintendo's permission, believing it would not have been a problem because GoldenEye 007 was one of the most popular Nintendo 64 games. Rare had completed the conversion and removed most of the bugs before they learned that Nintendo had not cleared it. This halted development until negotiation on rights could be discussed, which ultimately fell through. In January 2021, a full playthrough of a prototype of the XBLA version was streamed to YouTube, showcasing improved graphics running at 60 frames per second. Later, a near-final playable ROM image of the XBLA game was leaked online from an unknown source.

A second attempt at a re-release happened during the development of Rare Replay. Meant to resume the development of the remastered version for XBLA and going as far as having a pair of documentary videos getting produced for their inclusion on the collection, as well as an additional "5 things you didn't know about GoldenEye 007" video for a release on Rare's YouTube channel. However, licensing issues between Microsoft, Nintendo and EON Productions prolonged its inclusion until the game had to be left out of the collection to avoid missing its intended release window of 2015.

In January 2022, achievements for an Xbox One version of GoldenEye 007 were leaked. In June 2022, the same leaked achievements were seen on Xbox servers. VGC and Eurogamer reported that the leaked achievements suggested an official release was imminent. In September 2022, Microsoft, Nintendo and Rare announced the Nintendo 64 version would be rereleased on Xbox One and Xbox Series X/S through Xbox Game Pass, and on Nintendo Switch through the Nintendo Classics service. The Xbox version was remastered by Code Mystics and supports 4K resolution displays, but does not include any of the enhancements from the canceled XBLA remaster. The Switch release is playable in both the original 4:3 aspect ratio as well as widescreen (the same goes with the Xbox version), and is the only one to feature online multiplayer, via the Nintendo Classics emulator's built-in online multiplayer functionality. The Xbox version was published by Xbox Game Studios and both versions were released on 27 January 2023. Players who digitally purchased Rare's 2015 Xbox One compilation Rare Replay received the Xbox version for free. The standalone digital version of GoldenEye 007 will be removed from Xbox Game Pass on 15 November 2026.

=== Related games ===
After GoldenEye 007 was released, Rare began development of a spiritual successor, Perfect Dark. Using an upgraded version of the GoldenEye 007 game engine, Perfect Dark was released for the Nintendo 64 in 2000. Although the game features a setting and storyline unrelated to James Bond, it shares many gameplay features, including a similar control scheme, mission objectives that vary with difficulty settings, and cheat options unlockable through quick level completions. While Perfect Dark was still in development, Martin Hollis left Rare to work as a consultant on the development of the GameCube at Nintendo of America. Other members of the GoldenEye 007 team also left the studio to form Free Radical Design. The company developed the TimeSplitters series of first-person shooters. These games contain several references to GoldenEye 007, including the design of the health-HUD, the nature of the aiming system, and the Russian dam setting of the opening level of TimeSplitters 2.

After forming a partnership with MGM in late 1998, Electronic Arts published games based on then-recent James Bond films, Tomorrow Never Dies and The World Is Not Enough, as well as entirely original ones, including Agent Under Fire, Nightfire, Everything or Nothing and GoldenEye: Rogue Agent. Although Nintendo considered the possibility of bringing GoldenEye 007 to the Wii's Virtual Console in 2006, the game was never released for the platform due to legal issues involving the numerous licence holders with rights to the game and to the James Bond intellectual property. In 2006, the James Bond game licence was acquired by Activision. Activision published more games, including Quantum of Solace, Blood Stone and a 2010 remake of GoldenEye 007. The remake features Daniel Craig as the playable character, contemporary first-person shooter conventions, new level layouts, and online multiplayer. Activision lost the James Bond game licence in 2014.

In 2010, an independent development team released GoldenEye: Source, a multiplayer-only total conversion mod that runs on the Source engine. GoldenEye 007 had initially been intended for inclusion in Rare Replay; a behind-the-scenes featurette for the compilation was produced, but was not released until being leaked in 2019.

A fan remake powered by Unreal Engine 4, GoldenEye 25, was in development and originally scheduled for a 2022 release in honour of the game's 25th anniversary, but it was retooled into an original property called S.P.I.E.S. after MGM sent a cease and desist letter to the developers. This retooled effort was renamed and released as Agent 64: Spies Never Die on 11 August 2026 to positive reviews.

=== Speedrunning ===
As of 2025, the game continues to have a strong speedrunning presence, a following it has maintained since at least as far back as 1999, which was when GoldenEye 007 and Perfect Dark speedrunner and gaming documentarian Karl Jobst first discovered the community.

=== GoldenEra ===
On GoldenEye 007's 25th anniversary in 2022, a full-length documentary film titled GoldenEra was released. GoldenEra details the chaotic and intense development process as well as GoldenEye 007's effect on popular culture and modern first-person shooters.
