= Ai =

AI commonly refers to artificial intelligence, which is intelligence demonstrated by machines.

Ai, ai, a.i, A.I or AI may also refer to:

== Animals ==
- Ai (chimpanzee), an individual experimental subject in Japan
- Ai (sloth) or the pale-throated sloth, a northern Amazonian mammal species

== Art, entertainment and media ==
=== Works ===
- Ai (album), a 2004 release by Seraphim
- "A.I." (song), by OneRepublic, 2016
- A.I. Artificial Intelligence, a 2001 American film
- A.I. Rising, a 2018 Serbian film
- AI: The Somnium Files, a 2019 video game
- American Idol, a televised singing contest
- The American Interest, a bimonthly magazine (2005–2020)
- Asian Idol, a televised singing contest
- Australian Idol, a televised singing contest
- I (2015 film), an Indian Tamil film (initial title: Ai)
- The Spirits of Love, a 2006 Taiwanese television drama

=== Other uses in art, entertainment, and media ===
- Ai FM, a Malaysian Chinese-language radio station
- A.i. (band), a Californian rock-electroclash group
- All in (poker), wagering one's entire stake
- Appreciation Index, a British measure of broadcast programme approval
- Non-player character, in gaming (colloquially, an AI)

== Business ==
- Ad interim (a.i.), a phrase in job titles
- Appreciative inquiry, an organizational development method
- All-inclusive, a full service at a vacation resort, including meals and drinks

== Businesses and organizations ==
=== Art businesses and organizations ===
- Adventure International, a video game publisher
- The Art Institutes, a former chain of American art schools

=== Transport businesses ===
- Air India, the flag carrier airline of India
- Alitalia, the former flag carrier airline of Italy
- Astra International, an Indonesian automotive company

=== Other businesses and organizations ===
- Accuracy International, a firearms manufacturer
- Alexis I. duPont High School, Delaware, US
- Amnesty International, a human rights organisation
- Appraisal Institute, an association of real estate appraisers
- Autistici/Inventati, an Italian left-wing hacktivist collective

== People ==
- Ai (surname), a Chinese surname
- Ai (given name), including a list of people and characters with the name
- King Ai of Zhou (died 441 BC)
- Emperor Ai of Han (27–1 BC)
- Emperor Ai of Jin (341–365)
- Emperor Ai of Tang (892–908)
- Ai (poet) (1947–2010), an American poet
- Ai (singer) (born 1981), a Japanese-American singer and songwriter
- Allen Iverson (born 1975), an American retired professional basketball player ("A.I.")
- Andre Iguodala (born 1984), an American professional basketball player ("A.I. 2.0")

== Places ==
=== Areas ===
- Anguilla, a Caribbean territory (by ISO 3166-1 code)
- Appenzell Innerrhoden, a Swiss canton
- Armenia (by LOC MARC code)

=== Cities ===
==== United States ====
- Ai, Alabama
- Ai, Georgia
- Ai, North Carolina
- Ai, Ohio

==== Other uses in cities ====
- Ai (Canaan), Biblical city

=== Waterways ===
- Love River (Chinese: 愛河; pinyin: Ài Hé), a Taiwanese canal
- Ai River (Gifu), Japan
- Ai River (Dandong), China

== Religion, philosophy, and mythology ==
- Ái, a Norse god
- Ai (Canaan), Biblical city
- Ai (Chinese: 愛; pinyin: ài), Sinic concepts of love from Confucianism and Buddhism
- Agios, colloquially Ai, a Greek word for 'saint'
- Ai Toyon, the Yakut god of light

== Science and technology ==
=== Agricultural science ===
- Active ingredient, part of a pesticide
- Artificial insemination of livestock and pets, in animal breeding

=== Air force and aviation ===
- Airborne Internet, a proposed air-to-air data network
- Airborne Interception radar, a Royal Air Force air-to-air system
- Air interdiction, an aerial military capability
- Attitude indicator, a flight instrument on an aircraft

=== The Internet ===
- .ai, a top-level domain

=== Medical conditions ===
- Accommodative insufficiency, of the eye
- Amelogenesis imperfecta, of teeth
- Aortic insufficiency, of the heart

=== Medicines and healthcare ===
- Active ingredient, part of a drug
- Adequate intake, a Dietary Reference Intake nutritional parameter
- Aromatase inhibitor, a class of breast-cancer drug
- Articulation Index, a method of measuring hearing loss
- Artificial insemination, a method of fertilisation
- Automated immunoassay, automated clinical analyses of blood

=== Visual arts technologies ===
- Adobe Illustrator, a vector graphics editor
  - .ai, the Adobe Illustrator Artwork filename extension
- Automatic Maximum-Aperture Indexing, the aperture coupling on Nikon camera lenses

== See also ==
- Artificial intelligence (disambiguation)
- Art Institute (disambiguation)
- All In (disambiguation)
- A1 (disambiguation)
- AL (disambiguation)
- AY (disambiguation)
- Aye (disambiguation)
- Eye (disambiguation)
