= Ai (given name) =

- Pronunciation: Similar to the English word "eye"
- Gender: Female

Origin
- Origin: Chinese, Japanese, and Vietnamese
- Meaning: In Japanese love 愛 or indigo 藍, in Chinese/Vietnamese love, affection (愛), or mugwort (艾).
- Region of origin: China, Japan, Vietnam

Ai is a Japanese, Chinese and Vietnamese given name.

In Japanese, it is almost always used as a feminine Japanese given name, written as あい in hiragana, アイ in katakana, 愛, 藍 or 亜衣 in kanji. It could mean love, affection (愛), or indigo (藍). The kanji 亜衣 is only associated as a proper noun; it could mean Asian clothes.

In Chinese, it is commonly used as a feminine given name, but it also is given as a male name, written as "爱/愛", "艾" or other characters. It could mean love, affection (愛), or mugwort (艾).

In Vietnamese, it is commonly used as a feminine given name, but it also is given as a male name, written as "Ái" it could mean love, sentimental love, affection.

== Notable people from Japan with the name ==
=== Athletes ===
- Ai Fujinuma (藤沼 亜衣; born 1982), Japanese table tennis player
- Ai Fukuhara (福原 愛), Japanese professional table tennis player
- Ai Miyazato (宮里藍, born 1985), Japanese professional golf player
- Ai Otomo (大友 愛), Japanese volleyball player
- Ai Sugiyama (杉山愛, born 1975), retired Japanese professional tennis player
- Ai Shibata, (柴田 亜衣), Japanese professional swimmer
- Ai Shishime, (志々目愛), Japanese professional judoka
- Ai Ogura, (小椋 藍, born 2001), Japanese male motorcycle racer

=== Singers ===
- Ai (singer) (植村 愛 カリーナ; born 1981), Japanese-American singer and songwriter
- Ai Kago (加護 亜依, born 1988), Japanese singer and actress
- Ai Kawashima (川嶋 あい), Japanese pop singer, songwriter and pianist
- Ai Otsuka (大塚 愛; born 1982), Japanese singer-songwriter and actress
- Ai Takahashi (高橋 愛; born 1986), Japanese singer and actress
- Ai Takaoka (高岡 亜衣; born 1982), Japanese singer-songwriter
- Ai Tomioka (冨岡 愛; born 2002), Japanese singer-songwriter

=== Voice actresses ===
- Ai Furihata (降幡 愛), born 1994
- Ai Kakuma (加隈 亜衣), born 1988
- Ai Kayano (茅野 愛衣) born 1987
- Ai Kobayashi (小林 愛), born 1973
- Ai Maeda (前田 愛), born 1975
- Ai Nagano (永野 愛), born 1974
- Ai Nonaka (野中 藍), born 1981
- Ai Orikasa (折笠 愛), born 1963
- Ai Shimizu (清水 愛), born 1981, also a singer and professional wrestler
- Fairouz Ai (ファイルーズあい), born 1993

=== Other ===
- Ai Iijima (飯島 愛, 1972 – 2008), Japanese media personality, writer, and actress
- Ai Iino (飯野 愛; born 1986), Japanese shogi player
- Ai Haruna (はるな 愛), Japanese TV personality and singer
- Ai Hashimoto (橋本 愛), Japanese actress and model
- Ai Iwamura (岩村愛), Japanese actress
- Ai Kato (加藤 あい), Japanese actress and model
- Ai Kidosaki (城戸崎 愛, 1925–2020), Japanese chef
- Ai Kume (久米 愛; 1911–1976), Japanese lawyer
- Ai Kuwabara, Japanese jazz pianist
- Ai Maeda (actress) (前田 愛), Japanese model, actress, and singer
- Ai Morinaga (森永あい), Japanese manga artist
- Ai Moritaka (森高 愛; born 1990), Japanese model and actress
- Ai Ogawa (愛小川, 1947–2010) American poet
- Ai Sayama (佐山 愛, born 1989), Japanese AV actress
- Ai Shinozaki (gravure idol) (篠崎 愛), Japanese singer, gravure idol, and actress
- Ai Takabe (高部 あい), Japanese actress and voice actress
- Ai Tominaga (冨永 愛), Japanese fashion model and actress
- Ai Yazawa (矢沢あい), Japanese manga author

== Notable people from China with the name ==
=== Philosophy ===
- Xu Ai, Chinese philosopher during the mid-late Ming Dynasty

=== Sports ===
- Zhang Ai, female Chinese softball player

== Notable people from Vietnam with the name ==
Võ Văn Ái, Human Rights Activist, Poet

== Mythical and fictional ==
- Ai (Aria), a character in the anime series Aria
- Ai, a character in Darling In The FranXX
- Ai (Digimon Tamers), a character in the anime series Digimon Tamers
- Ai, the main character in Dōbutsu no Mori (film)
- Ai (DokiDoki! PreCure), a character in the anime series DokiDoki! PreCure
- Ai ( Just Roll With It), an African American character in the book series Just Roll With It
- Ai, the female protagonist of the SNK Playmore fighting game Neo Geo Battle Coliseum
- Ai, one of the main characters in the anime and eroge game Popotan
- Ai, a non-playable Mii opponent in the Wii series
- Ai (Tick! Tack!), a character in the visual novel Tick! Tack!
- Ai, a character in Tawawa on Monday
- Ai, a character in InuYasha the Movie 4: Fire on the Mystic Island
- Ai Amano, the main character in the manga and anime series Video Girl Ai
- Ai Doruyashi, a rival in the video game Yandere Simulator
- Ai Ebihara, a character in Persona 4
- Ai Enma, the main character of the anime and manga Hell Girl
- Ai Fuyuumi, a character in Oreshura
- Ai Haibara a.k.a. Shiho Miyano, a character in Detective Conan
- Ai Hayasaka, a character in the anime and manga series Kaguya-sama wa Kokurasetai
- Ai Hoshino, one of main characters in manga and anime series Oshi no Ko
- Ai Kaga, a character in the manga/anime series Sayonara Zetsubō Sensei
- Ai Mikami, a character in the manga and anime series Future Diary
- Ai Mikaze, a character in Uta no Prince-sama
- Ai Miyashita (宮下 愛), a character in the media project Nijigasaki High School Idol Club
- Ai Mizuno, a character from the MAPPA idol anime series Zombie Land Saga
- Ai Mori, a character in The Law of Ueki
- Ai Myoujin, the Fighter of the Breathless team in the anime Loveless
- Ai Nakashima, a sister is Makoto Nakashima and character in Haikyū!!
- Ai Nanasaki, a character in the game Amagami and the anime Amagami SS
- Ai Natsuki, a character in Yes! Pretty Cure 5
- Ai Omori, a character in Happiness Charge PreCure!
- Ai Shindou, a character in the anime and light novel series Beyond the Boundary
- Ai Sorakado, a character in the visual novel series Summer Pockets
- Ai Tanabe, a character in Planetes
- Ai Yazawa, a character in Battle Royale II: Requiem
- Ai Uozumi, a character in the tokusatsu series Chouseishin Gransazer
- T-AI or Ai-chan, a character in Transformers: Robots in Disguise
- Wang Ai Ling, a character in the Chinese Lilo & Stitch spin-off series Stitch & Ai.
- Ai Coleman, a character from Dorohedoro
- Kizuna Ai, Japanese Virtual YouTuber and channel host
