= Qian Dehong =

Chinese philosopher

Qian Dehong (simplified Chinese: 钱德洪; traditional Chinese: 錢德洪; pinyin: Qián Déhóng; Wade–Giles: Ch'ien Te-hung) was a notable Chinese philosopher, writer, and educator during the mid-late Ming Dynasty.

== Biography ==
Qian was born in Yuyao, Shaoxing Fu (紹興府/绍兴府; current Ningbo), Zhejiang Province. His original name was Kuan (宽), and courtesy name was Hongfu (洪甫). Because his recent ancestry also had the same name, to avoid the taboo, his name was changed from Kuan to Dehong.

When Qian was young, he settled in Lingxu Hill (霛緒山/灵绪山; aka Lingxushan) and systematically studied the I Ching, so people also call him Mr. Xushan (緒山先生/绪山先生).

In the 11th Year of Jiajing Era (嘉靖十一年; 1532), Qian joined the imperial examination together with Wang Ji, who was his classmate and also an important Confucian philosopher during his time. Qian was qualified and ranked as Jinshi (進士/进士).

He was later matriculated as a local governmental official. Qian spent most of his life as a secretary for Wang Yangming, and a lecturer in several schools.

== Philosophy ==
Qian was an early student (or disciple) of the philosopher Wang Yangming, together with his classmate Wang Ji. Qian spent most of his life studying Confucian classics and developing the philosophy of the Yangming School of Mind (陽明心學/阳明心学; Japanese: 陽明学; Japanese romanization: Ōyōmei-gaku, Ō stands for the surname "Wang", yōmei stands for "Yangming", gaku means "school of learning").

Qian collected and emended Wang's philosophical works. When Wang died, he also edited Wang's full biography. Qian demonstrated and further developed Wang Yangming's philosophy, especially the explanation of Wang Yangming's influential Four-Sentence Doctrine (四句教), however his interpretation was quite different from his classmate and colleague Wang Ji's.

Qian wrote the preface and postscript for Wang Yangming's most important philosophical work – The Record of Teaching and Practising (《傳習錄》/《传习录》)

== Other works ==
- Contributed to The Record of Teaching and Practising (《傳習錄》/《传习录》)
- Contributed to the Questioning to the Great Learning (《大學問》/《大学问》)
- Edited the A History of Horse and Posthouse Policies (《歷代馬政志》/《历代马政志》), 1 Volume

== Main references ==
Historic records & books:

- The Record of Teaching and Practising (《傳習錄》/《传习录》), Ming Dynasty
- The Collection of Xu Ai, Qian Dehong, and Dong Yuan (《徐愛錢德洪董澐集》/《徐爱钱德洪董沄集》), Ming Dynasty (Full collections of these three philosophers' works, plus their biographies)
- The History of Ming (《明史》): Biography of Qian Dehong

Modern materials:

- Ethics in the Confucian Tradition: The Thought of Mengzi and Wang Yangming, by P. J. Ivanhoe, 2002
- Questions on the Great Learning Introduction by Qian Dehong
