= Joshua Lisec =

American ghostwriter

Joshua Lisec is an American ghostwriter and author. He began working as a freelance writer while studying at Wright State University and later specialized in ghostwriting nonfiction books and memoirs. In 2025, The Observer reported Lisec had worked on more than 100 books, many whose identities are protected by nondisclosure agreements.

Lisec has also published books under his own name. Works by Lisec include So Good They Call You a Fake (2023) and the political books Unhumans (2024) and Bulletproof: The Truth about the Assassination Attempts on Donald Trump (2024), both co-authored with Jack Posobiec. Lisec has an author page on Simon and Schuster. Lisec is the author of four New York TImes bestsellers: Unhumans, Lies I taught in Medical School, Stay Off my Kitchen Table, and Unelected.

== Early life ==
Lisec was raised in Englewood, Ohio, and was homeschooled. He attended Sinclair Community College before studying communications at Wright State University.

While attending Wright State, Lisec began taking freelance writing assignments. His early work included editing, copywriting and blog writing. He later published the thriller novel The Phoenix Reich in 2013. According to the Dayton Daily News, conversations with readers contributed to his decision to pursue ghostwriting.

== Career ==
Lisec began by working in various forms of commercial writing before focusing on writing books. His ghostwriting work has included memoirs and books written for business owners, executives and other clients. Because much of ghostwriting is conducted anonymously, many of his collaborations have not been publicly identified.

By 2018, Lisec had begun promoting his work publicly rather than operating primarily as an anonymous ghostwriter. The Observer reported this partly reflected his expectation that artificial intelligence and changes in the publishing industry would affect conventional ghostwriting work.

Lisec has also studied hypnosis and received certification from the National Guild of Hypnotists. He has said that techniques involving visualization and conversational interviewing inform the way he interviews clients and develops material for books.

In 2023, Lisec published So Good They Call You a Fake, a book about writing, marketing and establishing professional credibility. The Dayton Daily News described the book as combining elements of memoir with instructional material.

== Political books ==
In 2024, Lisec co-authored Unhumans: The Secret History of Communist Revolutions (and How to Crush Them) with conservative political commentator Jack Posobiec. The book discusses left-wing political movements through historical examples. Unhumans argues similar political tendencies remain present in contemporary American politics.

Unhumans received a plethora of media attention after JD Vance, then the Republican nominee for vice president in the 2024 United States presidential election, provided an endorsement for the book.

The book was criticized by several political writers. Katha Pollitt of The Nation criticized its characterization of left-wing political movements and its treatment of historical anti-communist governments. In response to Robinson's article, Lisec disputed the interpretation that the book categorizes contemporary progressive Americans themselves as "unhuman". Later in 2024, Lisec and Posobiec co-authored Bulletproof: The Truth About the Assassination Attempts on Donald Trump, about the assassination attempts against Donald Trump during the 2024 presidential campaign. In 2026, Lisec was credited as a co-author, with political activist Cliff Maloney, of Run Right: A Complete Election Playbook to Win.

== Selected works ==
- The Phoenix Reich (2013)
- So Good They Call You a Fake (2023)
- Unhumans: The Secret History of Communist Revolutions (and How to Crush Them), with Jack Posobiec (2024)
- Bulletproof: The Truth About the Assassination Attempts on Donald Trump, with Jack Posobiec (2024)
- Run Right: A Complete Election Playbook to Win, with Cliff Maloney (2026)
