= Jennica Pounds =

American right-wing activist and former software engineer

- Profile picture utilized by Pounds across social media platforms as DataRepublican
- Born: Jennica Jane Humphrey
- Education: Gardner–Webb University; Rochester Institute of Technology
- Spouse: Brent Justin Pounds (m. 2008)
- Children: 2

Substack information
- Newsletter: DataRepublican’s Substack
- Notes: @datarepublican
- Topic: Politics
- Subscribers: 28 thousand

X information
- Handle: @DataRepubican
- Years active: 2020–Present
- Topic: Politics
- Followers: 1 million
- Last updated: November 9, 2026
- Website: datarepublican.com

Jennica Jane Pounds (née Humphrey), also known online as DataRepublican, is an American right-wing political commentator, activist, influencer, special government employee for the United States Department of Defense, and former software engineer. She is known for posting political content on X, frequently expressing support for right-wing policies and reduced government spending.

Pounds held a lengthy software engineering career where she reached senior positions in big tech companies, during which she began anonymously developing tools and visualizations to track government spending and left-wing groups. After her identity was revealed in 2025, Pounds began working closer with the US government and the Department of Government Efficiency. She was a member of the Pentagon Press Corps from April to June 2026, and was secretly hired the following month as a special government employee for the Pentagon. Her employment was exposed the following August, but the scope of her employment remains unclear. According to The Intercept, Pounds published information throughout 2026 regarding hacks targeting left-wing organizations while claiming to have insider knowledge on their operations.

== Personal life and software career ==
Jennica Jane Humphrey was born to parents from Mills River, North Carolina. Her father was a captain in the United States Navy. She has been deaf since childhood and has stated she is nonverbal and autistic, the latter making communication via sign language difficult for her. Humphrey stated she was drawn to programming after feeling cut off from other career paths due to being deaf. She graduated from Gardner–Webb University and completed a graduate degree in computer science at the Rochester Institute of Technology. While living in Seattle and working for Amazon in 2007, Humphrey became engaged to Brent Justin Pounds, at the time an ocean engineer and lieutenant for the NOAA Commissioned Officer Corps stationed in the city. The two married in 2008. The couple moved to Utah in 2019 looking for a better environment to raise their family, where they opened the Spirits of the Wasatch Distillery.

In addition to Amazon, Pounds also was employed by eBay and was at one point the director of software engineering for Snap. While holding this position at Snap in 2022, she was based in Florida. In 2025, Pounds was employed in a senior position by Upstart, a lending company known for its use of aritificial intelligence and connection to Peter Thiel. During her career, Pounds specialized in big data and machine learning optimization. She would resign from Upstart in February 2025 to assist the Department of Government Efficiency.

== Activism ==
Pounds built a substantial online following by developing data-analysis tools focused on federal spending and nonprofit organizations. She frequently posts reports, visualizations, and data leaks targeting left-leaning groups involved in protests and activism. Pounds started out in 2020 making election analysis breakdowns before transitioning to these tools, which are made using AI. After learning that the Department of Government Efficiency required ID numbers of NGOs in order to cancel their funding, she created DataRepublican.com as a tool to track the funding of organizations by the federal government in addition to donations from political action committees, salaries of officers, and connections to policymakers. The website went viral.

Pounds's content has been viewed by multiple right-wing political figures, including Elon Musk, Vice President JD Vance, and Utah Senator Mike Lee. Musk in particular has encouraged people to follow her X account and made decisions as part of the Department of Government Efficiency based on her posts. In particular, he cut $229 million worth of federal payments to Global Refuge, a faith-based non-profit which helps immigrants and refugees settle in the US which was 95% funded by taxpayers. Lee has also regularly shared Pound's posts and called her "a gift to America".

Pounds remained anonymous under the DataRepublican username until February 25, 2025, when she revealed herself after a user on Facebook identified her through the deaf community. Rolling Stone published an article about her revealed identity the next day. Following the Rolling Stone article, Pounds's distillery was targeted with negative reviews and the family removed her sons from their elementary school to stay in Florida until the resulting effects of the article subsided. That same month, she announced she resigned from her job to pursue DOGE-adjacent efforts full-time, hinting to Deseret News at a potential government job pending a background check.

In August 2026, she released DSA Explorer, a database tracking people affiliated with the Democratic Socialists of America.

== Government affiliation and employment ==
Pounds stated she had received a press pass for the Pentagon in April 2026. She was a member of the Pentagon press corps for two months, her credentials expiring in June. After letting her press credentials expire, Pounds was secretly hired by the Department of Defense in July 2026 as a temporary special government employee. Neither Pounds nor the Pentagon have clarified the scope in which she works. In a state department planning proposal for an initiative to counter Chinese propaganda in southeast Asia reviewed by The Guardian, Pounds was cited as a model for foreign recruits.

In August 2026, she accused Under Secretary of State for Public Diplomacy and Public Affairs Sarah B. Rogers of attempting to entrap her into publishing government secrets after Rogers sent her documents on allegations of censorship under the presidency of Joe Biden. Rogers denied the claim and Pounds later said that she regretted "making a public spectacle". After Pounds's accusation, right-wing news aggregator AF Post summarized the online argument between Pounds and Rogers while also writing that Pounds was employed by the Pentagon. A Pentagon employee confirmed her employment soon after, followed by Pounds revealing her employment to her followers.

== Activity involving cyberattacks ==
According to The Intercept, Pounds is part of a wider network of far-right X accounts that share posts between each other about hacks targeting left-wing organizations, particularly noting the link between Pounds and the X account AstraRCE. Pounds and the other accounts do not claim responsibility for such hacks, but they often make posts claiming to have insider information regarding hacks against left-wing targets and, at times, access to compromised systems. Pounds has claimed alongside AstraRCE in multiple hacks that the federal government had received leaked data from these hacks, including immigrant rights organization Siembra NC and StopIce.net. Pounds was credited among other accounts in a June 2026 Fox News report in the infiltration of a group of organizers protesting the Delaney Hall prison. In July 2026, she claimed credit for a honeypot operation against a Nigerian hacker, who she claimed had targeted right-wing media personality Hugh Hewitt.

Pounds was one of the first to post leaked data from a hack on NoBlogs in August 2026 after the hacktivist collective running NoBlogs, Autistici/Inventati, was sanctioned by the US government as a specially designated global terrorist organization the day prior. The hack resulted in the website's banner being altered to display the site's name as "TRUMPBLOGS". Pounds posted a visualization following the hack, also titled TrumpBlogs, mapping the leaked data on her website. She later backed up AstraRCE in confirming that the US government possessed the leaked internal data from NoBlogs.

== Bibliography ==
- Pounds, Jennica; Lisec, Joshua (2026). Unelected. Foreword by Edward Coristine. Los Angeles: Passage Press. ISBN 979-8901160626.
