= Voice confrontation =

Psychological phenomenon of not liking one's own voice

In psychology, voice confrontation, which is related to self-confrontation, is the phenomenon of a person not liking the sound of their own voice. The phenomenon is generally caused by disappointment due to differences between what a person expects their voice to sound like to other people and what they actually hear in recordings. These differences arise both in audio quality, including factors such as audio frequency, and in extra-linguistic cues about their personality.

== Causes ==
The auditory perception of a person's own voice is different when the person hears their own voice live and through recordings. Upon hearing a recording of their own voice, a person may experience disappointment due to cognitive dissonance between their perception and expectation for the sound of their voice.

=== Audio differences ===
The perception of hearing in humans is performed by the auditory system receiving mechanical sound waves in the eardrum. When the source of sound is another person, the sound waves are only received through the air (an external stimulus). However, when the source of sound is the observer's own vocal cords, sound waves also travel through the person's body to their ears (an internal stimulus).

Laryngologist Martin Birchall described hearing one's own voice while talking as "hearing it through a cave complex inside our own heads" due to the sound traveling through sinuses and various parts of the cranial cavity. As a result, a combination of internal and external stimuli has a different sound quality and different frequencies than external stimuli alone.

However, audio quality differences are not the sole factors in voice confrontation, as participants of a 2013 study gave significantly higher ratings to their voice when they did not recognise it as their own.

=== Extra-linguistic cues ===
In 1966, Philip Holzman and Clyde Rousey concluded from their studies that voice confrontation also arises from differences in "extra-linguistic cues" that reveal aspects of personality which are only perceivable through recordings, such as anxiety levels, indecision, sadness, and anger. People are accustomed to the sound of their voice from the combination of internal and external stimuli, so people "build our self-image and vocal self image around what we hear, rather than the reality" according to Birchall. In a 1967 study, only 38% of people were able to identify recordings of their own voice within 5 seconds.

The disappointment from extra-linguistic cues can be especially problematic for people with body dysmorphia and gender dysphoria since they may perceive their voice as sounding like someone of the opposite gender.

== In specific populations ==
In 1967, Holzman, Andrew Berger, and Rousey published a follow-up study on voice confrontation in bilingual people who had learned a second language after age 16. The study showed that the bilingual subjects experienced greater discomfort when hearing their own recorded voices in their first language.

Another study in 1970 found that people with speech disorders experienced greater voice confrontation than those without such issues. The results of the same study also found that females show a "significantly greater semantic differential reaction to hearing their own voices".

== See also ==
- Self-confrontation method
