= Heuristic (disambiguation) =

A heuristic is a kind of method for solving a problem.

Heuristic may also refer to:

- Heuristic (computer science), a problem-solving technique that produces approximately correct solutions
- Heuristic (engineering), an experience-based method reducing use of calculations
- Heuristic (psychology), a mental shortcut used to make decisions efficiently
- Heuristic argument, a non-rigorous argument that relies on an analogy or intuition
