= Autistici/Inventati =

Italian hacktivist collective

- Logo of Autistici/Inventati
- Abbreviation: A/I
- Established: 2001
- Dissolved: 6 September 2026
- Type: Nonprofit collective
- Services: Email; Mailing lists; Online chat; Web hosting; Video conferencing
- Methods: Hacktivism
- Website: www.inventati.org; www.autistici.org (defunct)

Autistici/Inventati (A/I) was an Italian hacktivist group that provided Internet communication services for groups opposed to fascism, militarism, racism, sexism, homophobia and transphobia. It was founded in 2001 by members of the anti-globalisation movement and supported Indymedia Italy in reporting on the 27th G8 summit in Genoa that year. The collective's communication services were available to non-commercial users who shared its left-wing positions. A/I also operated the online publishing platform NoBlogs.

A/I faced several instances of government surveillance and censorship. In August 2026, the United States Department of State added the group to its specially designated global terrorist (SDGT) list and alleged that its services were designed to facilitate violent attacks. Its autistici.org domain name was detained, its financial accounts were frozen, and NoBlogs was compromised and defaced. The collective shut down in early September, citing legal and financial risks.

== History ==
=== Origins and support for Indymedia (2001) ===
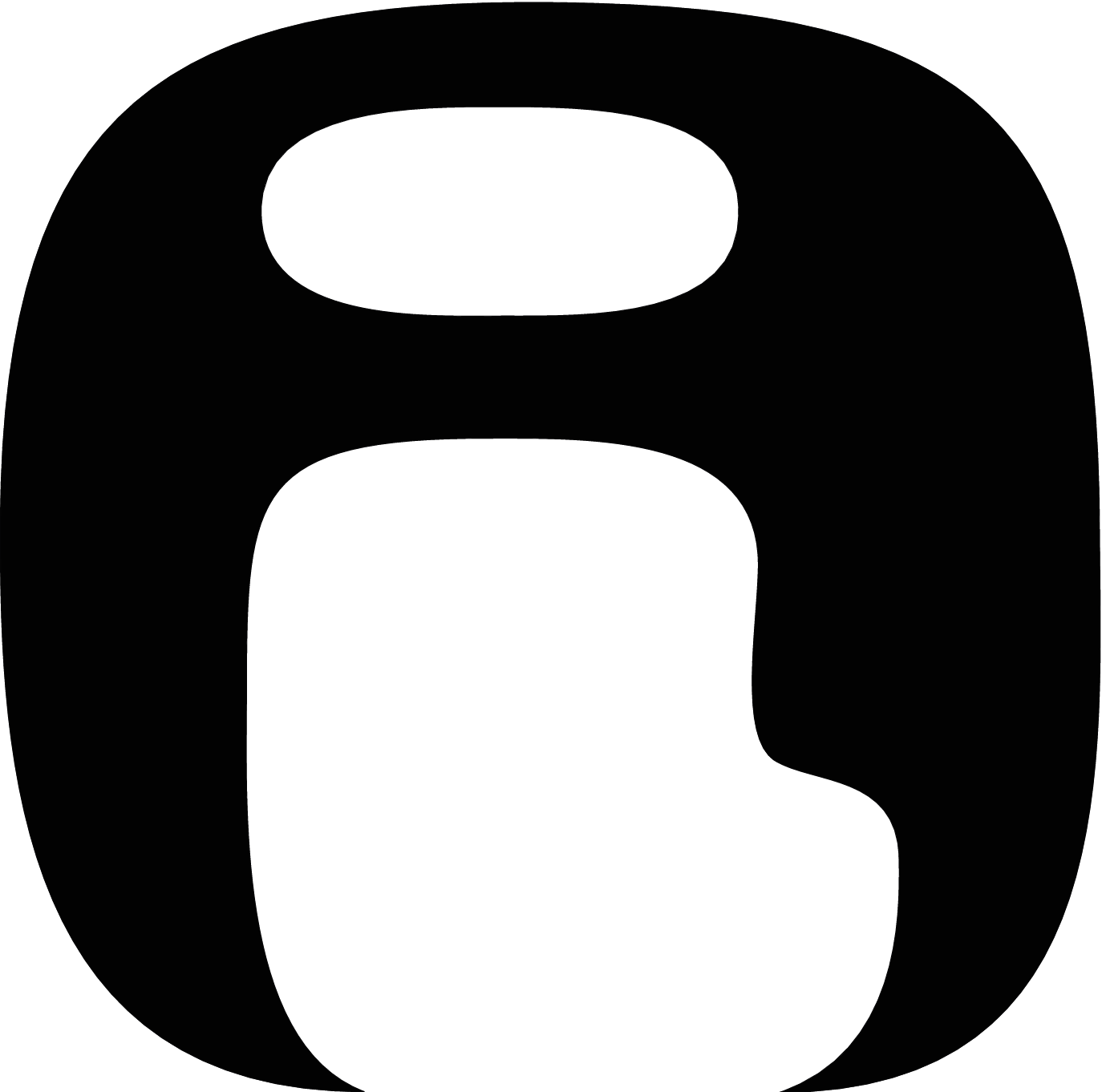
Logo of Inventati

By its own account, Autistici/Inventati arose from two communities of the late 1990s. In Milan, hackers formed the LOA collective, which hosted workshops to teach computing skills. The LOAs were called autistici (autistics) because they mediated interactions through technology rather than face-to-face. In Florence, citizen journalists called sgamati documented local protest actions in rebuttal to a hostile press. They later called themselves invèntati (invent yourself) or inventàti (the invented). After working together on protest events, the two communities explored the idea of setting up a permanent server that they and other activists could use. The server went online in March 2001.

A/I was part of the Indymedia journalist network: it provided information technology services to Indymedia and its members contributed content to the network. In the 2001 raid on the Armando Diaz School during the 27th G8 summit in Genoa, police stormed Indymedia's newsroom at the location and confiscated the network's documents and computers. Indymedia published photos of violence that occurred during the raid, after which A/I became a prominent web host for groups in the anti-globalisation movement.

=== Italian Postal Police wiretapping (2004–2005) ===
In June 2004, the Italian Postal Police, acting under the direction of prosecutors in Bologna, compromised A/I's main server. The collective discovered the intrusion a year later while examining documents from an investigation that had led to the seizure of the website of the anarchist group Crocenera Anarchica, which had been hosted by A/I. According to A/I, the police obtained the encryption keys for A/I's email service from its hosting provider, Aruba, gaining access to the private communications of A/I's 30,000 users; neither the police nor Aruba notified A/I of the wiretapping, which became public only in June 2005 and was described by internet lawyers as likely abusive and overreaching.

After A/I publicised the incident, Communist Refoundation Party parliamentarians Elettra Deiana and Titti De Simone called for the Ministry of the Interior to improve privacy safeguards for civil society, while Federation of the Greens parliamentarians Paolo Cento and Mauro Bulgarelli formally questioned the Ministry of Communications concerning Aruba's conduct. A/I stated that it would file a complaint with the Italian Data Protection Authority and urged the adoption of encryption tools such as GNU Privacy Guard. A/I was already overhauling its technical systems when the wiretapping came to light, and later adopted "Plan R", which implemented a redundant, distributed server architecture to improve data security.

=== Trenitalia parody website lawsuit (2004) ===
Italian railway company Trenitalia sued A/I for copyright infringement in 2004 in response to A/I hosting a parody website that criticised Trenitalia's transport of military equipment for use in the Iraq War. The parody website mimicked Trenitalia's website, but linked to Indymedia coverage of railway blockades and used slogans such as "Where do you want to move your tanks today?" in place of the original site's "Where do you want to go today?"

In August 2004, A/I was ordered to take down the website, refrain from mentioning Trenitalia or its domains, and publish notices of the removal in two national newspapers; European Digital Rights reported that the notices cost an estimated €20,000. The takedown order led Internet users to create and share numerous mirrors of the parody website. A Milan court overturned the takedown order in September 2004, ruling that the website constituted satire connected to current events and was therefore protected as free expression under Article 21 of the Constitution of Italy. Trenitalia was ordered to pay the legal costs of the proceedings.

=== Norwegian server data seizure (2010) ===
After two bloggers criticised a far-right Italian organisation on a website hosted by A/I, Italian police asked their Norwegian counterparts to obtain the bloggers' personal details from an A/I server based in Oslo. In November 2010, according to A/I, the Oslo Police District seized the server and copied its hard drive in full, including the data of about 7,000 A/I users. An Oslo police attorney said that the entire drive had been copied for convenience and that only the requested information would be transferred to the Italian police. A/I responded with a statement comparing the seizure to privacy violations in China and Iran. The seizure was also condemned by a director at IT industry group IKT-Norge, who equated it to seizing every safe deposit box in a bank when only two of them were of interest.

=== Other censorship events (2000s) ===
In July 2007, the entire NoBlogs.org was taken down in one of the first uses of law 38/2006, as one of its 150 websites hosted a mirror of a website by Molleindustria critical of the Catholic church (Pretofilia).

=== Consolidation (2010s) ===
In the 2010s, and particularly after the Snowden disclosures, Autistici/Inventati was noted as a provider of free software tools for authors and became a staple of surveillance self defence and privacy-conscious guides, together with other hosting collectives like Riseup and May First/People Link.

Autistici/Inventati was studied for its role in the history of the hacker movement and on the subject of digital identities and social media.

In 2012, it self-published a book on its first decade of history, KAOS (republished in English in 2017).

=== United States government sanctions (2026) ===
Under the second Trump administration, the United States government classified A/I as a specially designated global terrorist (SDGT) on 26 August 2026, alleging that A/I services were "specifically designed to support the operations" of what the US government considers "terrorist organizations" such as American antifa groups, Iran's Islamic Revolutionary Guard Corps and the Informal Anarchist Federation. The designation barred US citizens and corporations from transacting with A/I, subject to a one-month wind-down period. Non-US financial institutions that carry out such dealings also risk secondary sanctions. As a result of the designation, A/I lost access to its PayPal account and its domain name autistici.org was disabled within two days.

A/I rejected the allegations and stated it was planning a legal appeal. The Minister of the Interior stated that there was no obligation to implement USA sanctions in Italy. Speaking with la Repubblica, an A/I member likened the designation to incriminating Google for the actions of its email users. Reason compared the designation to the US government's ban on TikTok, arguing that banning A/I would push users to platforms more susceptible to US government surveillance. Brando Benifei of the Italian Democratic Party announced that he would present the issue to the European Commission to petition for A/I to receive protection under the Digital Services Act.

In a statement on 1 September, Banca Etica said that it had been forced to temporarily suspend A/I's bank account due to the risk of US secondary sanctions, and that it had asked the Ministry of Economy and Finance and the banking associations Associazione Bancaria Italiana and Assopopolari for a viable way to keep the account open. The bank accused the Trump administration of misusing the Office of Foreign Assets Control (OFAC) sanctions regime to designate entities whose political views differed from the administration's own as terrorists, and called on European governments to protect organisations and citizens from such misuse.

=== Shutdown (2026) ===
On 6 September, following the disconnection of the autistici.org in the Domain Name System (DNS) and seizing of the funds in the group's bank account, Autistici/Inventati announced closure and discontinuation of the services. In its shutdown announcement, A/I explained, "The possibility that our work may cause legal and financial consequences to those who are close to us – or even only have something to do with us – leaves us no choice."On 8 September, Italian media reported that A/I lawyers stated they filed a lawsuit against Banca Etica to restore access to their bank account,which they won in November 2026. Despite the judge's decision to reinstate A/I's access to its bank account, the collective announced it would not resume its activities and would only use the funds to pay any outstanding expenses.

== Organisation ==
The group does not have a coordinator, leader or permanent spokesperson. Decision making in the group takes places collectively instead of through majority voting. The group is supported by donations, fundraising events and volunteer labour. It does not accept cryptocurrencies, viewing them as financial speculation.

== Services ==
A/I services included email boxes, mailing lists, messaging, web hosting and video conferencing. Users were required to share the collective's stance against fascism, militarism, racism, sexism, homophobia and transphobia. To shield user privacy, the collective used encryption and minimal data retention. Aside from its services over the public Internet, A/I has assisted Associazione di Cooperazione e Solidarietà's GazaWeb project, which builds improvised wireless access points in the demolished Gaza Strip.

In an interview conducted between 2010 and 2011, a member of the A/I collective articulated a goal of "starting to imagine how to create [a digital identity] infrastructure, similar to the new corporate models, but that is free from corporate power and challenges them". Researchers Veronica Barassi and Emiliano Treré, writing in New Media & Society, framed this goal within the context of activists "trying to find ways to resist technological structures" and an aim "to develop Web tactics that challenge ideas of uncritical 'collaboration' promoted by business models and that are informed by critical questions on users' practices". Communications professor Alessandra Renzi stated in 2020 that "tech collectives like A/I have been performing the work of caring for the political, cultural, and affective networks of communication of movements for decades", which Renzi considered vital to movement-building despite its lower visibility compared to other types of activism.

=== NoBlogs ===
Logo of NoBlogs

A/I provided the NoBlogs (noblogs.org) Wordpress-based online publishing platform, which was used by researchers, radio shows, book fairs and other cultural projects. Jane's Revenge used the platform to announce attacks on crisis pregnancy centers. In 2025, American conservative publication Washington Examiner criticised several sites hosted on NoBlogs for detailing campaigns to disable surveillance cameras operated by Flock Safety in the United States.

On 28 August 2026, two days after the United States government placed A/I on its SDGT list, attackers compromised the NoBlogs website and altered the home page banner to display "TrumpBlogs". United States Department of Defense employee Jennica Pounds, under the handle DataRepublican, announced the security breach on X in conjunction with far-right hacker group AstraRCE. A/I disclosed that the incident exposed the email addresses and hashed passwords of NoBlogs users. Pounds subsequently published a map on her website depicting blogs hosted on NoBlogs.
