= Airborne Internet Consortium =

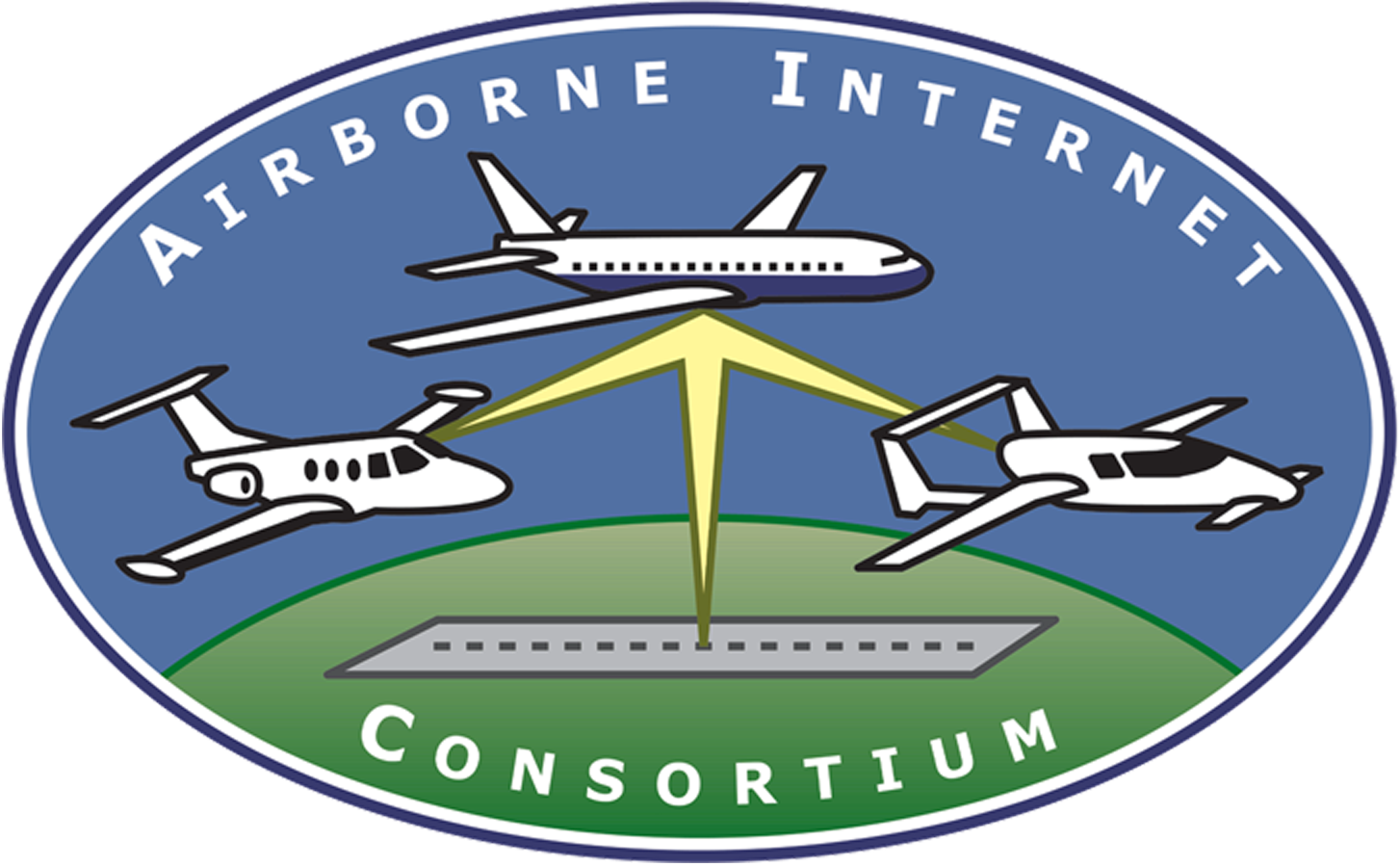
- Airborne Internet Consortium logo
- Formation: December 2004
- Dissolved: December 2018
- Type: Research and Development Consortium, Advocacy
- Purpose: Define, develop and promote IP-network enabled aviation communications
- Headquarters: San Francisco, CA
- Members: Six (6) commercial organizations
- Key people: William McNary, Chairman Paul A. Masson, Co-Executive Director James K. Meer, Co-Executive Director

The Airborne Internet Consortium (AIC) was a working group of small companies that formed a non-profit corporation in 2004 to foster research and development and advocacy of IP networked enabled communications for aviation. The AIC's purpose was to define, develop and promote common systems elements necessary to deploy comprehensive aviation based digital datalink capabilities throughout the United States using evolving internet capabilities. The adoption of commercially available, common internet based systems is discussed as an enabling concept within the US Department of Transportation's Next Generation (NextGen) Aviation Operations Concept of Operations. Expansion of internet based providers is called for in the US Department of Transportation's 2022 update of the National Airspace System (NAS)".

== History ==
The idea of an Airborne Internet began as a supporting technology for NASA's Small Aircraft Transportation System (SATS). Program planners identified the need to establish robust communications between aircraft, operations centers and ground facilities. Based on this recognized need, Ralph Yost proposed the idea of networking aircraft, in the same way we network computers - and thus the Airborne Internet was born.

A working team within the NASA SATS program was formed to compile the initial definitions and concepts for an Airborne Internet. The team was funded by NASA and the FAA to undertake preliminary steps. The working team continued as an information exchange group called the Airborne Internet Collaboration Group (AICG). The private sector members of the team formed the Airborne Internet Consortium (AIC) to further develop the concepts of operations and operational implementation guidelines as a basis for commercial adoption.

== Charter ==
The members of the Airborne Internet Collaboration Group held a series of meetings in late 2003 and early 2004 to establish a charter. The AIC adopted the same charter for their Mission statement:

1. facilitate collaborative research and development in the field of aviation communications
2. develop open systems architecture and standards for aviation digital communications
3. foster and promote general purpose, multi-application, scalable data channel protocols in aviation
4. develop intellectual content to guide public and private investment in aviation digital communications
5. promote international adoption of open systems architecture, standards, and protocols for aviation digital communications
6. foster use of advanced aviation digital communications technology for public security

== Outputs and services ==
The Consortium intended to generate reports and ongoing services including:

- Research Studies- Research reports to be copyrighted and treated as shared datarights among Principal members
- Standards and Guidelines Reports- Technical reports to offer as standards and certification guidelines for release into the public domain
- Ongoing Adoption Services- Ongoing standards liaison services provided to members as long as necessary to achieve the targeted goals for influencing and/or creating standards

== Membership and participation ==
The AIC was organized into four levels of membership:

- Principal- Organizations that funded and undertook research, and composed the voting representatives on the Board of Directors
  - Aerosat Avionics, LLC
  - Project Management Enterprises Inc.
  - Computer Networks and Software, Inc.
- Supporting- Organizations that did not fund but undertook research, and composed observing members of the Board of Directors
  - United Airlines/Flight Standards and Technology
  - c3daero, Inc.
  - Mulkerin and Associates, Inc.
- Governmental- Federal and state aviation transportation organizations
  - Federal Aviation Administration
- Individuals- Private citizens

== Launch, operation and transition ==
The Principal members of the AIC launched the entity in late 2004 after developing a business plan and preliminary technology development roadmap. The organization was led by William McNary of Aerosat LLC as president, and had co-Executive Directors: Paul A. Masson (StarNet, LLC), a professional in multi-party, R&D alliances responsible for overall management-administration, and James K. Meer (Microflight), a professional in aviation, information systems and digital communications responsible for funding and membership development.

The Consortium held working meetings in the spring and summer of 2005 to revise the technology development roadmap. The workplan and membership offering was distributed to the Joint Planning and Development Office, Boeing and Airbus, but did not result in growth of participation or offers to finance research and development.

The Board decided in the summer of 2005 to put further technology roadmap development on hold until either membership or project funding could be secured. The technology roadmap was released into the public domain as part of the membership recruitment. The AIC continued as a concept advocacy group until closure in 2018.

== Concept and architecture adoption ==
The network enabling concept advocated by the Airborne Internet Consortium was incorporated into the Concept of Operations for the Next Generation Aviation Transportation System (NGATS) national plan.

== Roadmap usage ==
The technology roadmap was used as a reference input by CISCO corporation during an evaluation of the feasibility and value of forming an aviation internet air cargo alliance in 2013.

== See also ==
- Aviation communication
- Airborne Internet
- Small Aircraft Transportation System
