= Artificial intelligence (disambiguation) =

Artificial intelligence is the simulation of intelligence as exhibited by software systems.

Artificial intelligence may also refer to:

== Music ==
=== Albums and EPs ===
- Artificial Intelligence (EP), or the title track, by Tom Cardy, 2021
- Artificial Intelligence (John Cale album), 1985
- Artificial Intelligence (series), a series of electronic music albums by Warp Records
  - Artificial Intelligence (compilation album), the first in the series
- Artificial Intelligence, a 1997 album by the Wynona Riders

=== Songs ===
- "Artificial Intelligence", a song by Detroit Grand Pubahs from the 2002 album Funk All Y'all

== Other uses ==
- Artificial Intelligence (book), by Patrick Winston originally published in 1977
- A.I. Artificial Intelligence, a 2001 film directed by Steven Spielberg
- Artificial Intelligence (journal), a scientific journal
- Artificial intelligence in video games
- Artificial intelligence in fiction, an intelligent self-aware artifact
- Artificial Intelligence: A Guide for Thinking Humans, a 2019 book by Melanie Mitchell
- Artificial Intelligence: A Modern Approach, a 1995 book by Stuart J. Russell and Peter Norvig

== See also ==
- Artificial intelligence in fiction
- Autonomic computing
- Expert system
- Fuzzy logic
- Heuristic (disambiguation)
- Intelligent agent
- Synthetic intelligence (SI)
- Virtual intelligence (VI)
