= List of Sayonara, Zetsubou-Sensei characters =

This is a list of characters from the manga/anime series Sayonara, Zetsubou-Sensei.

== Class 2-He ==
An image of most of the female members of the class. From left to right: Rin, Kiri, Nami, Matoi, Maria, Harumi, Kaere, Chiri, Abiru, Ai, Mayo, Meru, Manami, and Kafuka.

Nozomu Itoshiki is the homeroom teacher for class 2-へ (2-He; the hiragana character へ is the sixth in iroha order, indicating that there are at least five other classes in the same year) at a high school in Tokyo. The class is said to include 32 students, but only some of these students are introduced over the course of the manga. The story takes place over the years of the manga's publication (2005–2012), but the characters do not age despite attending high school for seven years.

Nozomu in the anime.

Nozomu Itoshiki (糸色 望, Itoshiki Nozomu)
Voiced by: Hiroshi Kamiya
Nozomu is a young man of unspecified age, who, despite living and working in modern day Tokyo, almost always dresses in old-fashioned hakamas rather than contemporary clothes. His name, written across in kanji, can be corrupted into zetsubō (絶望, "hopeless" or "despair"), reflecting his fatalist and defeatist attitude and causing his students to call him "Zetsubou-sensei". In many chapters, he observes negative, unwelcome, or dismaying incidents, which inspires him to list and point to many other examples of the same topic. This is often used as an excuse to criticize society, complain, or seek pity, often underscored by his catchphrase, "zetsubō shita" (絶望した), which has been variously translated as "I've lost all hope", "it's hopeless", and "I'm in despair".
Zetsubou-sensei often overreacts to his grievances by attempting suicide, whether or not any misfortune has befallen him. He keeps a suitcase packed with redundant suicide implements, including a noose, charcoal briquettes, masking tape, cleaning solutions, Enya albums, and a calligraphy kit (for penning a will), though he always resorts to hanging as his death of choice. These attempts never succeed, as any suicidal intent is far outweighed by his overactive, even preternatural self-preservation instincts, which often surface when others call his bluff. Eventually, his suicide attempts are all reduced to insincere attention-seeking, and are no longer taken seriously.
Zetsubou-sensei is habitually irresponsible and lazy, finding many excuses to be absent from class and also having no domestic ability. He is also ashamed of his ingrained cowardice, but cannot keep himself from instinctively cowering or running away when faced with danger. However, he also obliges menial requests and extends small kindnesses. While his ambition is to be recognized for literary talent, his writings are never well-received. He is often shown teaching the works of Edward Gorey to the class.
The series also makes light of Zetsubou-sensei's effeminate mannerisms and failure to be aroused by most women, and facetiously places him in accidental gay liaisons. However, he finds himself attracted to Kafuka's various alter egos, always failing to see through her disguises.
Despite understanding many human foibles, weaknesses, and hypocrisies, Zetsubou-sensei is far from immune to them. He is often enticed by Kafuka, whether by flattery, appeal to emotion, or opportunism, to embrace the very practices he himself condemned. However, in doing so, he is often set up to take a fall or receive comeuppance.
Zetsubou-sensei sometimes acts as an author surrogate, appearing to be overly familiar with the grievances of manga artists, and being highly defensive about the series's popularity or lack thereof.

=== Female students ===
Kafuka Fuura (風浦 可符香, Fu'ura Kafuka)
Voiced by: Ai Nonaka
Kafuka is, at first, presented as an overly credulous girl who confronts all misfortunes, dangers, and malefactors with denial, trusting in providence even in the face of imminent death. However, throughout most of the series, Kafuka's demeanor conceals a shrewd, sophisticated, and cynical nature, as she engineers many dark machinations beyond the ken of the rest of the cast.
Kafuka is rarely perturbed or caught off-guard, and smoothly reacts to even the most outlandish predicaments with a positive spin. In many cases, Kafuka's positive interpretations are actually damning with faint praise, and she often backhandedly compliments various victims and chumps as "kind" people. Other times, she frames a blatantly self-sabotaging or reprehensible course of action as sensible or commendable, leading others astray to harm or debase themselves. Yet other times, she interprets a human weakness as a "positive" opportunity to fleece people for profit.
Kafuka also exploits the credulity of others, preaching unaccountably optimistic promises that convert unsuspecting bystanders into faithful believers. Several times, she is seen ministering stereotypical religious cults. She also espouses numerous esoteric, paranormal, and conspiratorial beliefs, always hyperbolic and unbelievable. Her claims are often backed up by the arrival of eccentric people, many of whom claim to be notorious figures or supernatural entities, and who are always familiar with Kafuka on a first-name basis.
Zetsubou-sensei is particularly susceptible to Kafuka's suggestions even as he protests them, often reversing his own stances with little resistance, despite putting his own hypocrisy on full display. He often falls for Kafuka's efforts to match him with his students in illicit romance. Under various disguises, Kafuka also feeds him contaminated home cooking, delivers compromising love letters to him, and entices him to buy her own overpriced idol memorabilia.
The series concludes with the revelation that "Kafuka Fuura" is not one person, but rather the paranormal manifestation of An Akagi (赤木 杏, Akagi An), a deceased girl, through the other girls of 2-He. By chance, the other girls had all received donated tissues from An after her death, causing each one to assimilate "Kafuka"'s personality and memories. Due to donor anonymity, only Zetsubou-sensei, who witnessed An's death in a hit-and-run, knew "Kafuka"'s true identity all along. For the sake of devoting himself to An in marriage, he marries all the girls who are manifesting "Kafuka", even as they themselves have forgotten who she was.
Chiri Kitsu (木津 千里, Kitsu Chiri)
Voiced by: Marina Inoue
Chiri is a meddlesome and dictatorial girl who imposes her will on not just the class, but, on occasions, the entire world. She demands all people and things to be overliterally categorical, and forces anything that is variable, irregular, or open-ended to pick a lane, whether or not these lanes are good, feasible, or physically possible. Her name derives from the Japanese word kitchiri (きっちり, "precisely"), often used to describe her exhaustively fastidious and consistent lifestyle—which is laudable in some respects, but counterproductive in many others, such as her preference for worse, but matching, grades over better but mismatching ones. She scrupulously parts her hair exactly down the middle, but struggles to achieve sub-micron precision. In later chapters, she wears a hairband.
Chiri resorts to violence in many situations, often wielding a common household shovel as both a blunt and cutting weapon. She is prone to rampages and murder, and is a wanted fugitive and the target of manhunts. She is also versed in violent revolutions and purges throughout history, and has designs to conquer the country, and the world, through bloody insurrection. She also practices occultism and witchcraft, especially the ushi no toki mairi (丑の時参り) curse ritual; has a third eye as a pun on senrigan (千里眼, "clairvoyance"); finds inexplicable uses for raw meat; and performs uncanny feats of automatism.
Since childhood, Chiri has suffered from hallucinations and paranoia, and is accustomed to seeing frightening visions and imaginary enemies. Due to her disturbing delusions, Chiri had no childhood friends other than Harumi. She developed an unrequited desire for endearment, and became a third wheel or uninvited guest on many occasions. Lacking awareness of social cues, she is often oblivious to being snubbed, but is highly sensitive once made aware.
Chiri's many dangerous proclivities inspire deference and fear from her peers. Despite this, she is usually cordial and friendly with the class until provoked, and her dangerous impulses are sometimes restrained or foiled by others.
After accidentally sharing an infirmary cot with Zetsubou-sensei, Chiri became at once bent on marrying him, persisting despite being appalled by his behavior. Chiri's pursuit of Zetsubou-sensei is inevitably commandeering and heavy-handed (to the extent of single-handedly wiping out the rest of the human race), and, upon being rejected by him or sensing competition from others, she is swift to deliver vengeance.
Starting in the second season of the anime, Chiri's spoken punctuation became visible on-screen as a running joke.
Abiru Kobushi (小節 あびる, Kobushi Abiru)
Voiced by: Yuko Goto
Abiru is a habitually bandaged girl who is always impassive and deadpan, except when gleefully interacting with or discussing animals. Her name derives from "to bathe in fists" (拳[を]浴びる; kobushi [o] abiru), describing the extent of her injuries. After the class at first believed her to be a domestic violence victim, they learned that she engages in dangerous horseplay with animals to satisfy her fetish for tails. Later, it is shown that she also suffers injuries from being absentminded and accident-prone, and she is a poor athlete despite being advantageously tall. As a child, Abiru failed to heed stranger danger, and was unperturbed by many encounters with strange men. Abiru's left eye, which is always bandaged, is differently-colored due to a cornea transplant.
Abiru often delivers blunt, scathing comments that cut through oblique statements and pretenses. Despite clumsiness, she can nimbly sling bandages to ensnare objects and people.
Abiru's infatuation with Zetsubou-sensei stems from wishing to put a tail on him, and she is disappointed that he never spontaenously grows a tail. Nevertheless, she aggressively competes with the other students for his affection.
In the anime, Abiru is often juxtaposed with images of giraffes as a running joke.
Kiri Komori (小森 霧, Komori Kiri)
Voiced by: Asuka Tanii
Kiri is an extreme hikikomori (ひきこもり) who never ventures outdoors, indulging exclusively in indoor and domestic activity. Her name derives from komorikiri (籠もりきり, "recluse"), describing her lifestyle. Having no need for dressing up, Kiri always wears ungroomed long hair (eventually resorting to a front ponytail for practicality), casual clothes or undergarments, and a blanket. Despite relocating from home to live at school, she never attends class. The rest of the class, however, is sympathetic when she is in need.
Kiri is usually preoccupied watching TV or going online while barricading her room. After Zetsubou-sensei's house is destroyed, and he and Majiru also move into the school, Kiri becomes their domestic caretaker, handling all housework unconditionally. She and Majiru soon bond in a sibling-like fashion. Normally reserved, Kiri can be ill-tempered when provoked.
Because Zetsubou-sensei passively acquiesces to rooming with Kiri, she becomes possessive of him in a wifelike manner, and tampers in his affairs to have him to herself. Kiri's territoriality is particularly threatened by Matoi's frequent intrusion into their "home", and the vendetta between the two girls often escalates into outright brawls.
Early on, Kafuka baselessly declares Kiri to be a zashiki-warashi (座敷童子), who mystically guards homes against ruin. Though nobody takes this seriously, later, the school building indeed collapses as soon as Kiri exits the grounds.
Matoi Tsunetsuki (常月 まとい, Tsunetsuki Matoi)
Voiced by: Asami Sanada
Matoi is a zealous stalker devoted to hounding her love interests at every opportunity. Her name derives from tsune [ni] tsukimatoi (常[に]付き纏い, "always following around"). After latching on to Zetsubou-sensei, she dresses exclusively in hakamas to match his old-fashioned image, and follows him at all hours to all places. In class, rather than take a seat, she hides inside the lectern. Despite Matoi's flagrant invasion of his personal space and private affairs, Zetsubou-sensei is immediately resigned to this outcome and does little to discourage it.
Matoi usually appears near Zetsubou-sensei without warning, inevitably surprising him every time. She often backs up his topical discussions with her own knowledge, and leads the class to various hidden destinations, which are always allegorical conceits where many examples of a topic can be found. Habitually hiding behind telephone poles, Matoi is even able to uproot an entire pole to wield as a club. Due to her clandestine activities, she can also operate spy equipment, such as decoders and surveillance devices, as well as speak many languages, including extinct ones.
Nami Hitō (日塔 奈美, Hitō Nami)
Voiced by: Ryoko Shintani
Nami is a girl distinguished by being mundane, typical, and run-of-the-mill in every respect. Her name derives from hitonami (人並み), and characters often label her as futsū (普通), both of which can be translated as "normal", "ordinary", "average", and the like. Even though Nami's kneejerk protest against being called "normal" becomes her catchphrase, and she pulls various attention-seeking stunts, Nami almost always fails to behave in any exceptional or surprising way, causing her to become the butt of predictable jokes. Eventually, others misremember "Normal" as being her actual name.
Examples of Nami's normalcy include following trendy movies, products, and activities; having common knowledge and making common mistakes; visiting popular venues; being a sentimental romantic; and enjoying ramen. She also often misunderstands difficult words, and tells dull, aimless anecdotes. The rest of the class sometimes struggles to conceal their ennui when Nami tries to impress them with trite clichés and platitudes.
Partway through the series, Nami takes over a ramen shop and fastidiously develops a new recipe to rave reviews. From there on, Nami's gluttony and yo-yo dieting become a running joke, and she routinely relies on food metaphors to understand new concepts.
Later on, Nami is recruited into Miko and Shoko's idol group, AKaBane 84, and basks in the newfound adulation while failing to notice that she is coasting off the popularity of other members.
In the planning stages of Sayonara, Zetsubou-Sensei, Nami was originally planned to be the main heroine.
Tarō Maria Sekiutsu (関内・マリア・太郎, Sekiutsu Maria Tarō)
Voiced by: Miyuki Sawashiro
Maria is a small, foreign girl who illegally immigrated to Japan to escape war and poverty in her unspecified home country. She secretly shares overcrowded housing with many other refugees, but attends school officially, having purchased the name and enrollment of a male student named Sekiutsu Tarō, which derives from seki-uttarou (籍売ったろう), meaning "I'll sell my name". Despite her non-native Japanese skills, and being habitually barefoot, Maria passes herself off as a Japanese citizen using rehearsed and fabricated personal information. The rest of the class is won over by Maria's humble means and ingénue character, and provides her with acceptance and support.
Maria is both childishly impressionable and well-informed about Japan at the same time. She praises many aspects of Japanese society, though many of her compliments are backhanded, or outright critical, from a citizen's perspective. On other occasions, she points out the comforts that the Japanese people take for granted. Many chapters end with Maria delivering a moral, or an ironic comment on the story.
Being agile and animalistic, Maria can pounce and attack on a whim. After falling victim many times, Zetsubou-sensei becomes conditioned to fear her and do her bidding, and starts carrying an emergency whistle.
Maria is sometimes seen with an unnamed friend of similar stature and descent, who never speaks but repeatedly takes kill shots at Zetsubou-sensei with a sniper rifle.
The former Tarou Sekiutsu, who has sold all his worldly entitlements, sometimes appears as a homeless vagrant.
Meru Otonashi (音無 芽留, Otonashi Meru)
Meru is a girl who never speaks, solely using her phone to communicate, whether by texting or by simply holding up the screen. Meru's family name, Otonashi, means "soundless", and her given name derives from the loan word "mail" (メール, mēru). Despite being visibly timid, she brazenly flames others in hostile and profanity-laden messages. Early on, Meru becomes baselessly convinced that Zetsubou-sensei is secretly bald, and repeatedly insults him for this. As a result of past school bullying, Meru experimented with voice confrontation, reacting so extremely as to repress her voice to the present day.
As the manga debuted in the mid-2000s, Meru uses flip phones, although her phone models were ironically outdated even then. Later, she also uses smartphones.
Meru's father is a wealthy and powerful business magnate, who lavishes her with extravagant indulgences while disregarding her own wishes and preferences. As a result, he is not exempt from her insults. He often lurks nearby to personally inflict punishment for any and all transgressions upon Meru.
As a non-speaking character, Meru has no voice casting in the anime, denoted by a string of nonsense symbols in her voice credit slot. In episode 6 of the second season, Chiwa Saito voices Meru in a dream sequence.
Harumi Fujiyoshi (藤吉 晴美, Fujiyoshi Harumi)
Voiced by: Miyu Matsuki
Harumi is a stereotypical fujoshi (腐女子) (from which her last name derives), who is preoccupied with reading or drawing boys' love doujinshi at all times, whether in class, out and about, or even in the wilderness. Her annual summer and winter schedules revolve around preparing doujin publications for Comiket (her first name deriving from Harumi (晴海), the convention's previous venue).
Sharing these interests with only one (unnamed) friend, and apparently having no interests outside of anime and manga, Harumi is frequently out of touch with social conventions, and becomes used, at her expense, as an unflattering example in many of the class's topical discussions. While often giddily oblivious, Harumi is sufficiently self-conscious to sometimes hide her hobbies, and to be mortified when called out. She is also embarrassed by her three older brothers all being otakus and aspiring animators.
Harumi is a natural-born athletic prodigy, excelling in all sports effortlessly, though these talents largely go unused.
Harumi's interest in yaoi extends into real life, and her attraction to Zetsubou-sensei, far from romantic, is solely for the purpose of slash pairing him with fictional or real men.
From childhood, Harumi became Chiri's only friend, being the only one curious about Chiri's alarming behavior. In the present day, their familiarity sometimes breeds contempt, as Chiri finds Harumi's hobbies repellent, and Harumi has retroactively understood Chiri's antisocial and dangerous actions.
Kaere Kimura (木村 カエレ, Kimura Kaere)
Voiced by: Yu Kobayashi
Kaere is a tall, blonde girl who has returned to Japan after studying in an unspecified overseas country. Her given name derives from Japanese kaere (帰れ), the imperative form of the verb kaeru (帰る, "to return; to go back"), and also from Kaela Kimura, a Japanese idol. Belligerent and assertive, Kaere nitpicks many aspects of Japanese culture, making comparisons to the (always outlandish and apocryphal) culture and rituals she picked up overseas. She wears private school uniforms, in contrast to the rest of the class. She is enthusiastically litigious, threatening to sue so often that it becomes her catchphrase.
Despite Kaere's culturally clashing behavior, her overseas experience turns out to be far exaggerated, as she spent only two months away and her spoken English, despite self-confidence, is shown to be incomprehensible. The finale of the series finally reveals that Kaere never left Japan at all, having merely returned from a remote island.
At first, Kaere is established as having a second personality called "Kaede", who is demure and obedient to Japanese tradition, and who falls in love with Zetsubou-sensei even when Kaere does not. However, Kaede only rarely resurfaces.
Over time, many of Kaere's appearances are reduced to panty shots, often in the background. Kaere eventually is seen so rarely that she appears on several occasions solely to protest being omitted.
Ai Kaga (加賀 愛, Kaga Ai)
Voiced by: Saori Gotō
Ai is a constantly compunctious, anxious girl, who assumes that her presence troubles others (with her name deriving from kagai (加害, "to harm")), and apologizes profusely whenever she attracts attention, regardless of context. She avoids being seen as much as possible, habitually ducking and dodging to avoid even the audience's view through the fourth wall. She is so high-strung as to faint when put on the spot, suffers from mood swings, and is often late for school.
Despite her deference, Ai possesses great tenacity, being able to bow in apology with incapacitating force, and possessing the will to master any art, science, or sport. She is shown to be versed in classical arts and literature, and works as a shrine maiden. She practices bowing based on inanimate objects, such as drinking birds and Slinkys.
Ai develops heartfelt love for Zetsubou-sensei after he shows her kindness and compassion on several occasions. However, she is usually unwilling to stake any claim to him.
Manami Ōkusa (大草 麻菜実, Ōkusa Manami)
Voiced by: Kikuko Inoue
Manami is a housewife and experienced homemaker, despite still being high-school age. Her name derives from okusama-nami (奥様な身, "a married person"). Having married into extenuating debt, Manami works many side hustles to prop up household finances, and always cooks frugal meals and wears mended clothes. However, she falls for many get-rich-quick schemes, such as payday loans, gambling, multi-level marketing, and day trading, inevitably compounding her debts. Manami's down-to-earth troubles, including marital dissatisfaction (resulting in mutual infidelity), debt evasion, and economic anxiety, are usually presented for their sobering contrast to other petty concerns.
Manami treats others with motherly protectiveness, causing even older boys or men to become submissive and childlike.
Mayo Mitama (三珠 真夜, Mitama Mayo)
Mayo is an outright malicious girl who wilfully commits acts of common cruelty. Her name derives from mita mama yo (見たままよ, "exactly what it looks like"). Since she never speaks (aside from one line of narration, voiced by Asuka Tanii), little is known about her motivations except that she abuses Zetsubou-sensei to express affection. Mayo has subjected Zetsubou-sensei to stabbings, beatings, immolation, and anal penetration, and also destroyed his house. She seemingly does not understand human reproduction, and tries to reproduce Zetsubou-sensei by horticulture.
Mayo wields a steel baseball bat as a weapon, and she is shown to be drawn to urban exploration.
Kanako Ōra (大浦 可奈子, Ōra Kanako)
Voiced by: Ayahi Takagaki
Kanako is always placid and serene, to the point of being vacant most of the time; she can sit in the same position for hours or even a week, unperturbed by discomfort. Kanako is also heedless of danger or being taken advantage of, and her name derives from the phrase ōraka na ko (大らかな子, "big-hearted girl"). She is carefree to the point that her clothes are never fully put on.
Miko Nezu (根津 美子, Nezu Miko) and Shōko Maruuchi (丸内 翔子, Maruuchi Shōko)
Voiced by: Michiko Neya and Voiced by: Yui Horie
Miko and Shoko are two mercantile girls who seize upon every business opportunity in sight, conjuring articles for sale immediately. Miko's name derives from nezumi-kō (ネズミ講, "pyramid scheme"), while Shoko's name derives from maruchi-shōhō (マルチ商法, "multi-level marketing"). In their first appearance, they notice Zetsubou-sensei's popularity among the girls of the class, and begin selling subscriptions for a kit to assemble a lifesize Zetsubou-sensei automaton. Later, they launch the highly lucrative idol group "AKaBane 84", in which twelve members collectively perform as 84 different roles.
Kotonon (ことのん)
Kotonon is a net idol who has fabricated a popular, cute image through extensive photo-editing to compensate for her obesity in reality. She usually appears as the target of stereotypical fat jokes, and is depicted as self-delusional about her attractiveness.
Madoka Marui (丸井 円, Marui Madoka)
Voiced by: Asami Sanada
Madoka is a minor character who fills the role of an additional girl in class. Her surname is a pun on marui (丸い, "round-shaped") and her first name means "circle", referencing her double bun hairstyle.

=== Male students ===
Kagerō Usui (臼井 影郎, Usui Kagerō)
Voiced by: Youji Ueda
Kagerou is a prematurely balding student, who is so unassertive as to become literally invisible and inaudible to others, despite his vocal protests. His name derives from kage ga usui (影が薄い, "overshadowed"), while usui (薄い) also refers to his thinning hairline. Though he was elected class president by default, the class remained unaware, while assuming that Chiri had the role. Highly insecure about his balding, Kagerou often seeks ineffectual hair growth treatments and styling techniques which inevitably fail to improve his appearance. Thanks to Chie-sensei's verbal and physical abuse, he discovers that he is a masochist. He also becomes infatuated with Abiru, but always fails to get her attention.
Kagerou repeatedly shows himself to be a poor comedian who relies on bad puns.
Jun Kudō (久藤 准, Kudō Jun)
Voiced by: Takahiro Mizushima
Jun is a voracious reader and masterful storyteller, able to improvise a heart-wrenching story on the spot from any topic. His name derives from the bookstore Junkudo-Shoten (ジュンク堂書店, Junkudō Shoten) and Jun Kudō (工藤 淳, Kudō Jun).
Kuniya Kino (木野 国也, Kino Kuniya)
Voiced by: Takuma Terashima
At first said to be a rival who competes with Jun at every opportunity, Kuniya (named after the Books Kinokuniya chain) is far more often shown as a fashion victim, who always sports garish, avant-garde outfits outside school. His clothes have featured clashing colors, superfluous openings and extreme cropping, excessive graphics and patterns, oversized pieces, frills, puffiness, plumage, hair, and non-clothing ornamentation. It is later revealed that his clothes, chosen by his stylist mother, reflect her deteriorating mental state after losing her job, though Kuniya himself is entirely oblivious to this. He also becomes smitten with Ai, and only becomes more encouraged each time she rejects him.
Kuniya was initially a student in another class, along with his friends Aoyama (青山) and Haga (芳賀). Gradually, all three became fixtures of class 2-He.
Luckless trio
Chapter 80 introduced Satoshi, Kazunori, and Mikio, three homely male students who are always seen together, bemoaning their lucklessness in love.

== School staff ==
Chie Arai (新井 智惠, Arai Chie)
Voiced by: Akiko Yajima
Chie-sensei, the school counselor, is at first a strict, no-nonsense foil to Zetsubou-sensei's antics, but, later, mainly appears to explain various psychological concepts for the class and readers' benefit. Her name can be read as "Niichie", a reference to Friedrich Nietzsche. Due to her seriousness and well-endowed figure, she is shown dominating masochistic men—both inadvertently and as a full-fledged dominatrix. As an adult woman living alone, the series also makes light of her status as a "Christmas cake".
Jinroku (甚六)
Voiced by: Yōji Ueda
Jinroku-sensei is an older male teacher. While mild-mannered, he exhibits brutal combat prowess, hinting at a violent past.

== Itoshiki family ==
The Itoshikis are a prestigious family in Kuraizawa (蔵井沢), Shinshū Prefecture (信州県, Shinshū ken), a parody of Karuizawa, Nagano. They reside in a 70 hectare mansion, wield political influence, and are trusted to endorse quality products with their family seal. The family heads, Hiroshi Itoshiki (糸色 大, Itoshiki Hiroshi) and Tae Itoshiki (糸色 妙, Itoshiki Tae), are never seen, though Hiroshi is said to take great amusement when his children are placed in awkward predicaments.

The characters for "Itoshiki" (糸色, which are not a real-life surname) can be written as radicals of the lone kanji zetsu (絶, "beyond"), which, when preceding another character, often reverses its meaning. Thus writing Itoshiki-ke (糸色家, "Itoshiki house") resembles zekke (絶家, "extinct family"). As a result, the family's children curse their own lineage for rendering all auspicious names ill-fated instead.

Later, it is revealed that the family's wealth and influence are not its own; rather, the Itoshikis have been standing in for over 100 years for the family of a feudal lord, who collectively went into hiding and never returned.

Rin Itoshiki (糸色 倫, Itoshiki Rin)
Voiced by: Akiko Yajima
Rin, the youngest Itoshiki child, is a seventeen-year-old ikebana master and trained in sword fighting. Her name can be corrupted to mean zetsurin (絶倫, "unequaled"), which nominally describes exceptional talent, but is also a euphemism for sexual prowess. Living in luxury with unfettered access to family wealth, Rin often visits town to indulge her curiosity about "commoners" in a patronizing and sheltered fashion, even enrolling as a student in Nozomu's class.
Rin often plays pranks to tease or humiliate Nozomu in the manner of close siblings; however, her pranks are so vast in scope as to entail founding viable businesses or construction projects.
In chapter 155, Rin meets with an acquaintance, a similarly affluent girl. Despite appearing in the opening sequence of the third season, this unidentified girl has no further appearances.
Mikoto Itoshiki (糸色 命, Itoshiki Mikoto)
Voiced by: Hiroshi Kamiya
Mikoto, the family's third son, is a doctor who runs a local clinic. While his given name providentially means "life", his name can be corrupted to mean, inopportunely, zetsumei (絶命, "end of life"). Though this has torpedoed the popularity of his eponymous clinic (except with patients seeking assisted suicide), Mikoto is the go-to doctor for everyone in class throughout the series, and also conducts checkups and screenings at the school. Though he is more adult than Nozomu, Mikoto likewise suffers ill temperament, and is, unbefittingly, squeamish.
Kei Itoshiki (糸色 景, Itoshiki Kei)
Voiced by: Takehito Koyasu
Kei, the family's second son, is an avant-garde artist guided by personal prerogative. His name can be corrupted to mean zekkei (絶景, "superb scenery"). He embraces many quixotic and unfathomable beliefs and rituals, often refusing to explain himself. After declaring his lucky color to be black one day, he begins carrying an unidentified, bulbous black object. As a child, Kei wilfully leapt from a dangerously high window, and to this day performs feats of inhuman vigor.
Enishi Itoshiki (糸色 縁, Itoshiki Enishi)
Enishi, the family's first son and father to Majiru, is never seen for most of the series. His name can be corrupted to mean zetsuen (絶縁, "disinherited"), and he is, indeed, formally disowned for unspecified reasons. After Majiru is left in Nozomu's care, Enishi is hinted to be watching over his son and trying, but being unable to, make contact.
In chapter 297, Enishi finally appears; just as he has split from his own family and son, he works as a lawyer mediating divorces and separations. He reveals that, throughout the series, he could only appear incognito by donning a helmet, imbued with spiritual warding, as Nozomu's kagemusha decoy.
Majiru Itoshiki (糸色 交, Itoshiki Majiru)
Voiced by: Akiko Yajima
Majiru, Nozomu's nephew and son of Enishi, is left in Nozomu's care when his own parents cut ties with him for reasons never specified; thus, his name can be corrupted to mean zekkō (絶交, "cut ties"). Due to Zetsubou-sensei's domestic ineptitude, the girls of the class voluntarily care for Majiru, even adding this to the classroom duty rotation. After Zetsubou-sensei moves into the school, Kiri becomes Majiru's caretaker for the rest of the series.
Majiru is a typical preschool boy, spending much idle time reading manga or watching TV, and also discovering his own prepubescent attraction to adult women. He aspires to be treated like an adult, but overestimates his own readiness. Like everyone in class, Majiru too looks down on his uncle as a hopeless case.
Tokita (時田)
Voiced by: Yōji Ueda
Tokita is the family's aged, many-talented butler, capable of bringing to fruition any whim, no matter how capricious or hare-brained. He is often seen chaperoning Rin and orchestrating her grand plans, sparing no expense. Although Tokita and the family alike know that the Itoshiki family wealth actually belongs to the Tokita bloodline, Tokita declines his rightful place as master of the house, preferring a life of service.

== Others ==
Wataru Manseibashi (万世橋 わたる, Manseibashi Wataru)
Voiced by: Yōji Ueda
Wataru is a stereotypical otaku who prioritizes anime and manga over real-life concerns. His name comes from Manseibashi o wataru (万世橋を渡る, "to cross over Mansei Bridge"); Mansei Bridge is a bridge that connects Chiyoda and Akihabara. He is enrolled in the neighboring class 2-ほ (2-Ho, the fifth class of second year). Early on, he often appeared to discuss topics from the otaku's perspective, filling in for the rest of the cast's unfamiliarity. Despite being self-aware that he is a sucker for exploitative marketing, Wataru nevertheless cynically rationalizes wilfully being exploited. He sometimes dresses as a superhero, righteously putting other otaku in their places.
Ikkyū (一旧)
Voiced by: Tomokazu Sugita
Ikkyu is a young man who, like Nozomu, indulges in old-fashioned dress and taste. The two know each other as "old friends" (旧友, kyūyū) of only one day (1日友, ichinichitomo) in elementary school. His name is a reference to the anime series Ikkyū-san. Although he has no connection to the school or the class, he becomes a fixture of many of the class's discussions.
Despite his preferences for the old, Ikkyu ironically adopts cutting-edge and future technology.
Kōji Kumeta (久米田康治, Kumeta Kōji)
Voiced by: Hiroshi Kamiya
Kumeta depicts his authorial self-insert as unkempt, embittered, defensive, and procrastinating. He is shown as cavalierly failing to heed deadlines, working with no lead time (even brazenly suggesting that he should be given ten days per week) and causing his editors to hound him. He is usually seen hunched over a drawing desk, talking over his shoulder. Over a number of chapters, he repeatedly dredges up old grudges over the cancellation of Katteni Kaizō by Shogakukan. He also begrudges former assistant Kenjiro Hata's greater success and fame, claiming this as accomplished at his own expense.
Maeda-kun (前田君)
Voiced by: Himself (first season's stage name is MAEDAX and second season's is MAEDAX G and third season is MAEDAX Roman or MAEDAX R)
Kumeta's assistant, identified only as "Maeda", not only makes many appearances in the manga, but also has his real-life face inserted into many incongruous scenes of the anime as a visual gag. He provides his own voice, as well as various vocal sound effects, and receives special thanks in the credits of each episode. Maeda is often depicted as a deplorable lecher and sexual deviant, coming to a head in the final bonus episode, where the cast openly admits to having motive to murder him.
Negative Club
The "Negative Club" were four high-school students who scouted a young Nozomu, bringing out his latent negative outlook on life by gaslighting him into becoming a pariah. The four only appeared in a flashback, teased in volume 16 of the manga and only shown in full in the anime.
Taku Gojiki (護敷 卓, Gojiki Taku) and Hajime Kuji (久慈 一, Kuji Hajime)
Gojiki and Kuji are two local government bureaucrats. Only appearing a few times after their introduction, they are used to satirize various Japanese civil service initiatives.
Tane Kitsu (木津 多祢, Kitsu Tane)
Voiced by: Ryōko Shiraishi
Tane is Chiri's older sister and a university student. Her name derives from the Japanese word kittane (汚ったね, "dirty"; in broken Tokyo dialect form). In stark contrast to Chiri, Tane is an unhygenic, easygoing slob, who, far from being merely untidy, causes even tidied rooms to spontaneously fall into disarray, and magnetically attracts trash of every conceivable kind.
In the sisters' childhood, seeing Chiri's compulsive cleaning habits about to cause harm, Tane dirtied herself to divert Chiri's efforts away. Since then, Tane remained a slob in self-sacrifice for Chiri's sake. As a result, every summer break, Tane's homecoming devotes Chiri to a constant cycle of tidying and organizing.
Zetsubou-sensei and Tane become mutually enamored upon their first meeting, though ultimately nothing comes of this.
Woman working odd jobs
Chapter 196 introduces an unnamed young woman as its perspective character. Initially working at Tokyu Hands, she is shown filling various other retail and miscellaneous jobs, as well as one of the AKaBane 84 roster slots. Although she has few distinguishing characteristics, in her debut, she becomes Jigsaw and inflicts hazardous traps upon Zetsubou-sensei. Her name is not given until the epilogue of the final manga volume.
