= Airborne Internet =

Airborne Internet is a system that overlays network theory and principles into the transportation realm. Its goal is to establish seamless information connectivity between ground based infrastructure and airborne entities. To reach that goal, the system aims to create a scalable, general purpose, multi-application data channel for people in transit.

Airborne Internet is a technology that has the potential to integrate and support a myriad of activities, in both the cockpit and cabin environments. The original concept proposed in 1999 suggested an open system with a scalable architecture: one that is a general purpose, multi-application data channel, for all communications, navigation and surveillance exchanges. Airborne Internet sees all the participating aircraft acting as air-to-air relays, each operating in a peer-to-peer relationship with other aircraft, and supporting the network, even if an aircraft is not consuming bandwidth for its own purposes. Every aircraft is a node on the network.

Airborne Internet for the cockpit offers many possibilities: digital air traffic communications that enables the pilot to have better access to digital information sources, air transport operations and administration, enhanced weather information, 4-dimensional trajectory flight plan management from the air traffic control system, safety and security. Safety will be enhanced when the flight crew is better able to access information sources faster than before. Digital verification techniques can be employed to ensure the security of the information. Airborne Internet also provides the potential to be used by the Federal Air Marshals, airline operations, and flight crew for security information purposes. Aircraft maintenance functionality can use the network to provide important status information to the air carrier.

Airborne Internet for the cabin offers communications for passengers, in-flight entertainment, and other non-critical information sources.

The end-state Airborne Internet system is envisioned as a network of ground stations, specially equipped aircraft, satellites and unmanned aircraft systems to carry two-way broadband communications traffic to aircraft for use by passengers, operators and air traffic control centers. It has the potential to change how aircraft are monitored and tracked by air traffic control systems, and how they exchange information with and about other aircraft (peer-to-peer). Critical information such as weather, turbulence, and landing conditions can be exchanged, as well as the distance between aircraft and the ground. This information becomes even more critical for aircraft that are beyond line of sight range. There would also be the capability to allow aircraft passengers to go online to check their e-mails, pay bills and surf the web without interference with radio and aircraft control signals.

== Background ==
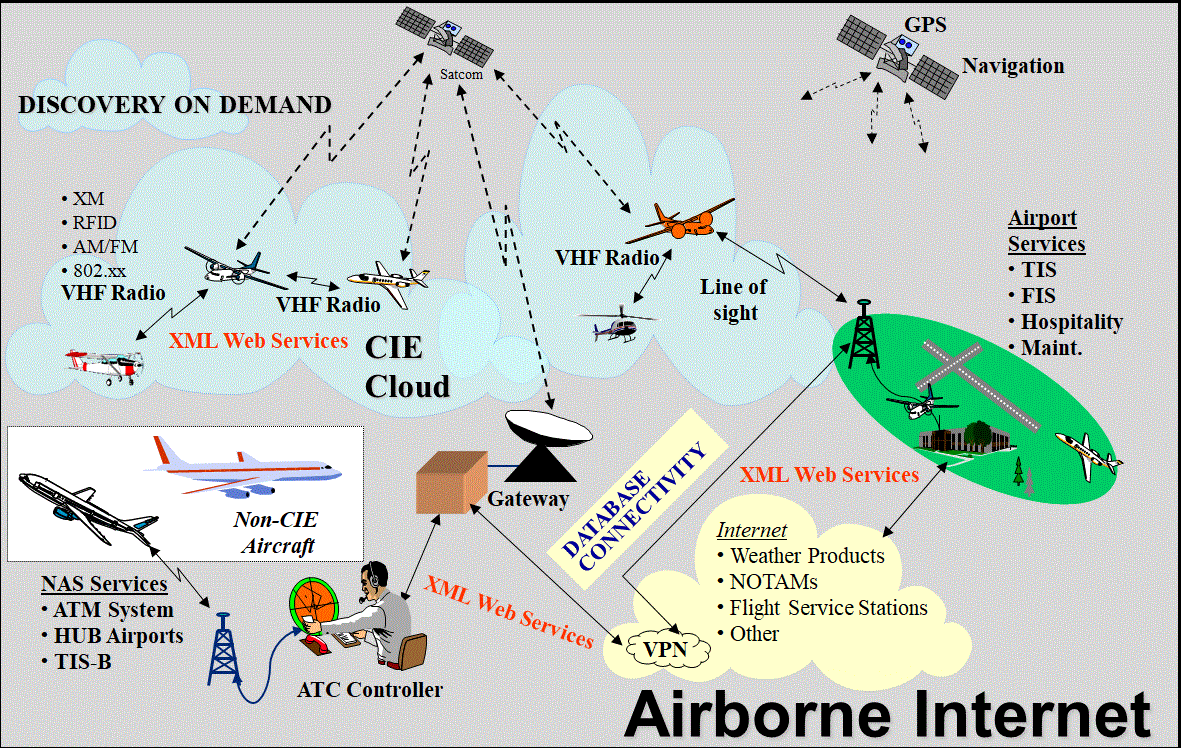
The Airborne Internet Collaborative Information Environment

The fundamental premise of Airborne Internet is that network capability to aircraft will improve the way operators of aircraft and the National Air Space will handle information, as well as non-air traffic functionality. Various commercial solutions have emerged, but these solutions are all satellite-based and only work with a single aircraft. None of these existing satellite solutions provide aircraft-to-aircraft connectivity. An early implementable network connectivity solution was needed that would allow all aircraft types to participate in, and join the network: transport, regional, biz jet, GA, and even helicopters. Aircraft information flow will remain stove-piped (in each unique system) unless a ubiquitous network solution for aircraft is determined. The assumptions made for ground networks do not apply to Airborne networking links.

== History ==
Multiple sources had been working on the general concept of network connectivity for aircraft in the 1990’s, including the U.S. military and its contractors. One of the earliest suggestions of what came to be known as “Airborne Internet,” took place in July 1999 at a NASA Small Aircraft Transportation System (SATS) Planning Conference. The Federal Aviation Administration’s Ralph Yost suggested a civil system for airborne network connectivity that started as a supporting technology for SATS. The name “Airborne Internet” was actually coined by NASA’s Dr. Bruce Holmes, then the Program Manager for SATS, who conveyed it to Yost. Although it was ultimately used by SATS in their multi-aircraft, high volume operations flight demonstration at Danville VA, NASA chose not to invest further in the development of Airborne Internet. Because NASA declined to pursue Airborne Internet further, and based on his originally proposed concept, Yost then cultivated his original Airborne Internet idea and subsequently started the Federal Aviation Administration’s own Airborne Internet research project at the FAA William J Hughes Technical Center in Atlantic City N.J. (The Airborne Internet capability that supported SATS was subsequently the winner of NASA's "Turning Goals Into Reality" Mobility Award for revolutionizing aviation).

Yost started (and still owns) the web site www.AirborneInternet.com. Yost then went on to form the Airborne Internet Collaboration Group (AICG), which matured into the Airborne Internet Consortium (AIC). Once the AIC was formed, it was handed over to interested corporate entities to manage, and government participation was withdrawn.

Originally called “Airborne Internet,” the “Internet” moniker was not received well internally by FAA management. The name of the FAA R&D Airborne Internet program was subsequently changed by Yost to “Airborne Networking.” The name changed appeased the FAA management and added synchronization to similar efforts by the U.S. military. All mentions and publications about “Airborne Internet” or “Airborne Networking” most likely refer to the same research program initiated and conducted by Yost.

Yost worked with two early developers of Airborne Internet capabilities, each with completely different approaches and different operational capabilities. Each company had similar ideas about air-to-air networking, but implemented them in completely different ways.

The first system in the FAA’s Airborne Internet R&D program was developed by Project Management Enterprises Inc. (PMEI), of Bethesda, Md., headed by Prasad Nair. It was used by all aircraft in NASA’s SATS multi-aircraft flight demonstration conducted at Danville VA.

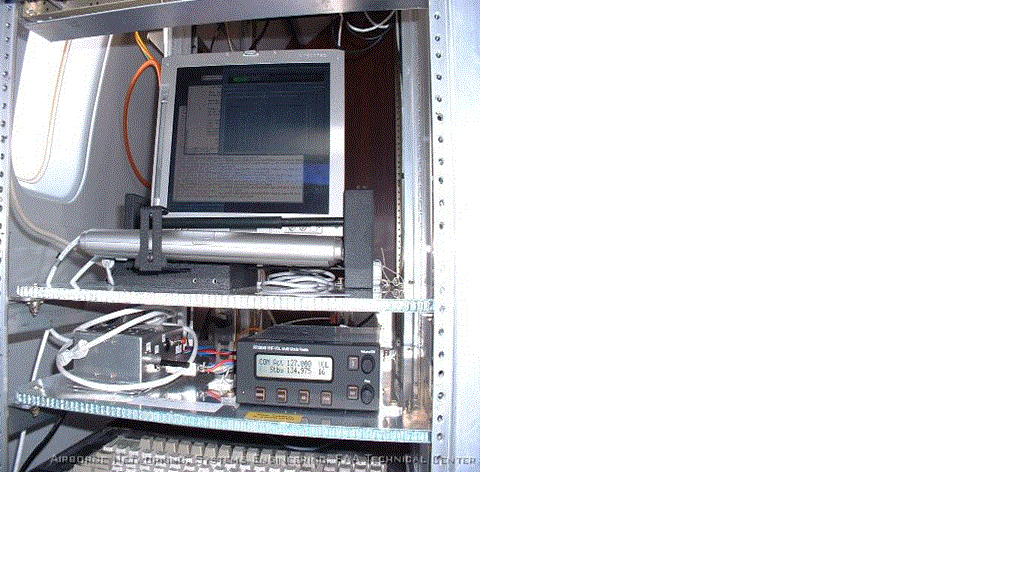
PMEI VHF Airborne Internet radio system

The PMEI system utilized a standard aviation VHF radio channel, and therefore was a low bandwidth system. But PMEI had smartly developed their networking capability to uniquely work in the low bandwidth radio, including the ability to report aircraft position to every other aircraft on the network. They further refined network capability and applications that allowed weather, and other useful information, to very effectively function in the low bandwidth VHF radios. The PMEI system, supporting a narrowband 25Khz channel and a 19 kbit/sec link, combined a standard aircraft omnidirectional VHF antenna with a small multichannel data radio using network protocols, and offered an additional voice channel that could be used simultaneously. Internal GPS could optionally be used to provide own-ship position data, which could then be shared (as a simple application) with other network users to enhance situational awareness. The system connected with a standard local area network (LAN) on the aircraft.

In contrast to the PMEI low bandwidth approach, the second system in the FAA’s Airborne Internet R&D program was developed by AeroSat (now Astronics Aerosat) of Manchester, New Hampshire, and provided very high bandwidth. It included a single, high-gain directional antenna, for long-range connectivity, and two omnidirectional units, for use over ranges of about 100 nm. This combination supported two TCP/IP data communications options: 90 Mbit/sec – that is, 45 Mbit/sec in each direction in the Ka and Ku-bands - for aircraft in the network “backbone,” and a 1-2 Mbit/sec L-band link that allowed secondary aircraft to access the backbone. The concept of operations brought by Aerosat was to establish a very high backbone network between aircraft, then have lower bandwidth aircraft connect (directly or relay) into the backbone. Based upon the early flight tests conducted, Aerosat estimated that only 8 aircraft would be needed to extend the network over the Atlantic from shore-to-shore.

== Airborne Internet Flight Tests ==
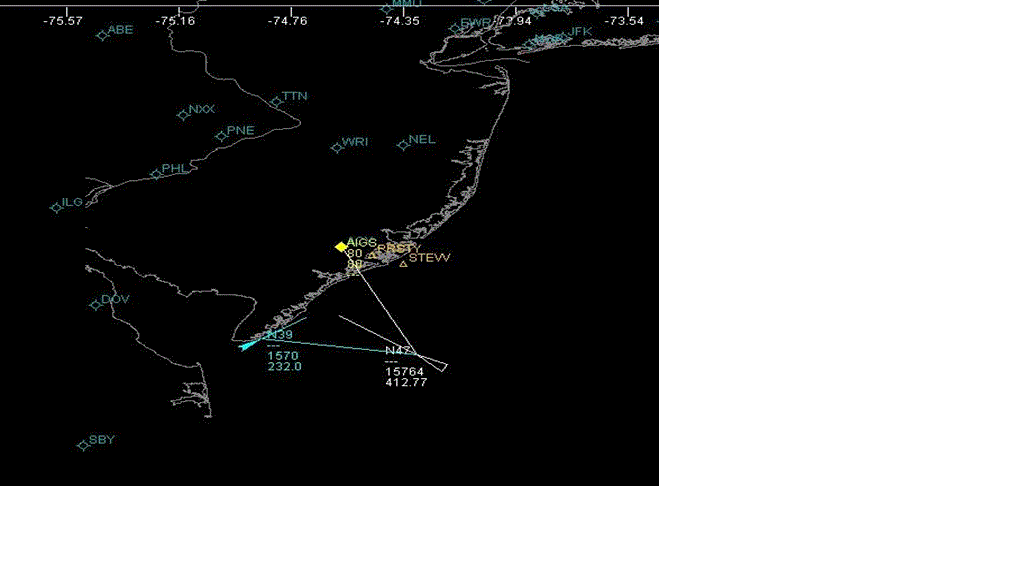
Two aircraft network relay to/from ground station

Important proof-of-concept flight tests were conducted at the FAA William J. Hughes Technical Center, in late July 2006, using the system developed by PMEI. These critical tests successfully demonstrated a “beyond line-of-sight” relay capability, where data communications took place at a distance greater than the curvature of the Earth normally allows for direct line-of-sight radio communications. This capability was achieved by establishing network connectivity between a distant aircraft, an intermediate-placed aircraft, and a ground station.

The Airborne Internet project was the first to conduct flight tests in the FAA Technical Center’s Bombardier Global 5000 Business Jet. The “flying laboratory” was equipped with multiple Airborne Internet capabilities. Two aircraft, a ground station and ground-based communication support networks were used in the flight tests. The project engineers successfully relayed messages and simulated 4-dimensional flight planning information from one aircraft to another, and then to the ground station, over an extended airborne network. In fact, an e-mail message was successfully sent to 172 people during one of the flight tests, from 140 miles out over the ocean.

As of Jul 2006, this was the first-ever civil aviation (non-military) successful proof-of-concept flight test of this kind, conducted in the world.

Airborne Internet technology offered potential solid support for the FAA’s NexGen air traffic management system, which required implementation of 4-dimensional trajectory flight planning. The Airborne Internet technology has strong potential to enhance future oceanic communications, resolving communications and location problems currently faced in the oceanic environment.

Next, the FAA Airborne Internet program conducted flight testing of its early Airborne Internet systems by testing both system capabilities simultaneously. The flight tests increased with complexity, and utilized multiple aircraft as network nodes and multiple ground stations. Ground stations were located in Bethesda MD and the FAA William J Hughes Technical Center in Atlantic City N.J. The FAA collected data for each system during these flights which proved that both the low bandwidth PMEI and high bandwidth Aerosat systems were viable and ready for operational commercialization.

== Capabilities Proven by the FAA’s Airborne Internet R&D Program ==
· “Shared Situational Awareness”, Net-Centric Operations

· Position Reporting, Broad-area broadband, Data & Voice, Security, Responsiveness, and User-tailored information

· Real-time free-flow of info from private, commercial, & government sources

· Push/pull processes, secured according to needs and priorities

· Common awareness of day-to-day ops, events, crises

· Aircraft are additional “nodes” in network

· Integrated surveillance system across government

· Complete interoperability for ALL classes of aircraft

· Beyond Line of Sight (BLOS) relay

· Voice Over Internet Protocol (VoIP)

· Fully supported the operational needs of the FAA’s NexGen program for Network Enabled Access (NexGen Con Ops 2.0, Jun 2007, Joint Program Development Office (JPDO).

== See also ==
- Air traffic control radar beacon system
- GPS, a system using satellites for communication to Earth
