= Self-confrontation method =

Psychological technique

In psychology, the self-confrontation method (SCM), developed by Hubert Hermans, is a technique for examining people's behavior modification. It relies on people's inconsistent knowledge and dissatisfaction with their own values, motivation, behaviors, or with their personal meaning systems and those of significant others. Self-confrontation psychology is based on two theories which are valuation theory and dialogical-self theory.

== Background ==
The self-confrontation method is a specific evaluation and intervention tool guided which focuses on the individual's feelings and motivation. SCM is influenced by James's work (1890) and Merleau-Ponty (1945,1962), as well as Bruner(1986) and Sarbin(1986). SCM is organized into a narrative structure when Hermans developed the Valuation Theory as a framework for research of personal experience over time (1987-1989). Self-Confrontation is not limited to one field of practice it can be used in different purposes such as psychotherapy and psychology.

== Process ==
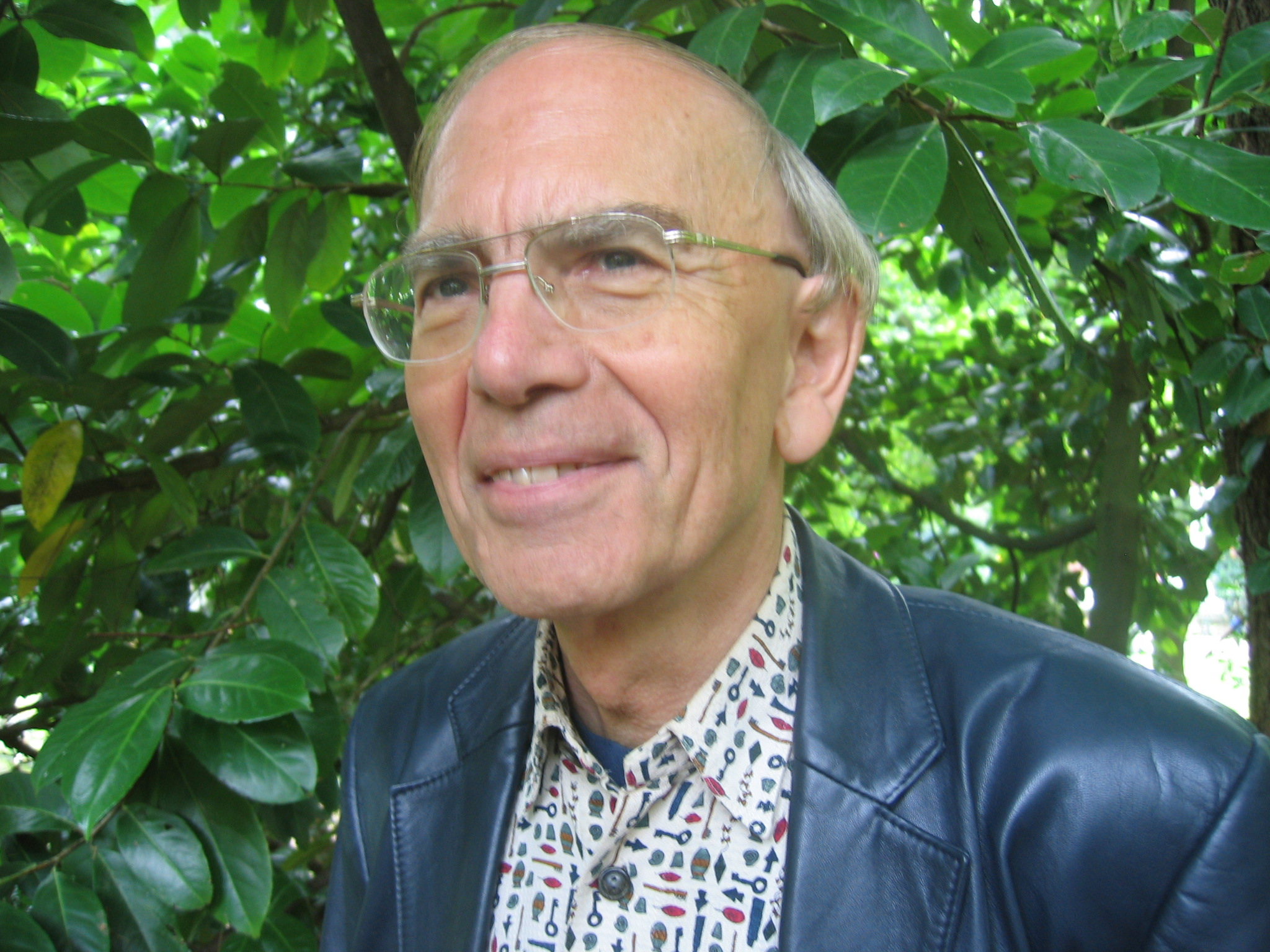
Hubert Hermans

The self-confrontation method is a relational process that involves researching and organising the client or subject's valuations, including the ways in which these valuations are reorganized over time. The process has been separated into three parts: 1) valuation elicitation; 2) affective rating; 3) discussion of the results. Firstly, the construction of the client's valuation system is happening in the consultation between the client and psychologist. The consultation starts with open questions which refer to the client's past, present and future. In the second phase of the SCM, a list of affect items about the basic motives (Self and Other) is provided to the client who is invited to evaluate the emotional quality of the different valuations. The S-motive is expressed in self-esteem, strength, self-confidence, and pride, whereas the O-motive is expressed in tenderness, caring, love, and intimacy. In the last phase, there is a deep discussion about the content and organization of the valuation system including its affective properties. In this discussion, the client may realize that she has never listened to herself and may decide to pay attention to those situations in which she conforms with other people. She is encouraged to experiment with new behavior in problematic situations.

The self-confrontation method enables the client to see the relationships between the several valuations referring to their past, present and future. When clients see their own valuational system as influenced by basic motives, they can get a deep insight into their selfsystem. Therefore, it is very useful to help clients to explore the quality of their valuation system when they are in a time of intensive change. In particular, it is relevant to them to discover the ways in which they get more control over their own lives.

== Theories ==
=== Valuation theory ===
Valuation theory was developed by Hubert J. Hermans, it is based on the hypothesis that people are positive meaning constructors and constantly organizing and re-organizing their lives. A central feature of this theory is that any valuation has an affective component and that in this component the basic motives are expressed. It comprises three components: story, motivation and sharing which provide an adequate basis for understanding the client's self-narrative and the nature of their emotions. Sarbin is one of the main advocates of the narrative method. He believes that story or narrative is a method for organizing one's plot and action. In addition, he explains that narratives organize people's silent stories, fantasies and daydreams, plans, memories, and even love and hates. The central factors of the narrative are real or fictional events that can only be understood in the context of time and space. Multiple and spatially oriented agents, as conscious beings, engage in a variety of actions, filling in the story. In those stories the actors are purposeful and motivated.

Within valuation theory, the valuation is viewed as a relevant meaning unit when people telling about their own life, such as a cherished memory, an interesting dream, a difficult problem or a good consultation with friends. These valuations will be structured as a system and re-organized over time. The main idea of this theory is that every valuation has an affective component which expresses the basic motives. The theory assumes that self-reflection and narration can be deepened by exploring the characteristics of emotions and motivation. The interpretation of these basic themes in self-narration is one of the main purposes of self- examination. On the other hand, the ‘self’ in valuation theory is viewed as an ‘Organized process’. The theory emphasizes that each person's unique experience of life's arrangement can be expressed in a meaningful self-narrative. The theory draws attention to the individual's experiences and historical qualities, which means that people live in the present, but from there they are oriented to their past or future.

==== Dialogical-Self Theory ====
Dialogical-self theory(DST) brings two concepts 'self' and 'dialogue' together to gain a deeper understanding of the interrelation between self and society. Normally, the key point of the ‘self’ is something ‘internal’ and occurs within the individual, while the dialogue is usually associated with what is ‘external’, which is the process that takes place between people engaged in communication. In Dialogical Self Theory, the self is ‘extended’ which means that individuals and groups in the society are incorporated into the micro-society of the self. As the result of this extension, the ego includes not only internal positions but also external positions. Not only actual others who exists outside the self, but also imaginary others are interiorized as others in the self. DST postulates that the self as a psychosocial entity is composed of internal and external self-positions. When some positions are dominating and silence other positions, monological relationships prevail. On the contrary, when positions are recognized and accepted in their differences and otherness, it is possible for dialogical relationship to further develop and renew the self and its role in society.

Moreover, DST is inspired by Mikhail Bakhtin who proposed the metaphor of the ‘polyphonic novel’. The emphasis in the polyphonic novel is not on the author, is on the characters. In Bahktin's argument, the characters are not ‘obedient slaves’ serving Dostoyevsky's intentions, but relatively autonomous and they may even disagree with the author's ideas. It is as if Dostoyevsky entered his novel and identified with different characters, who participated in the process of agreeing and disagreeing. The polyphonic novel expresses the different and opposing world views of the ‘same’ Dostoyevsky. This view has stimulated the development of DST as a theory that is sensitive to the far reaching decentralization of the self in a globalizing world.

== Research ==
Over the several years, SCM has gained the support for its value as a research tool (Hermans, 1987, 1992; Hermans & Oles, 1994, 1999; Van Geel & De Mey, 2004; Van Geel, De Mey, Thissen-Pennings, & Benermacher, 2000). The researchers use the method as a strategy to study a series of topics and problems of the SCM. A preliminary study of self-confrontation is related to psychological attributes. This research focused on data about the internal consistencies and intercorrelations of the S (self-enhancement), O (contact and union with others), P (positive affect), and N (negative affect) indices, and the discriminant validity of the method.

Hermans and Hermans-Jansen used case studies to describe the role of the SCM is a useful way to assess the client's change over the course of counseling. As an example, a client did three successive self-investigations interspersed over the course of counseling. In the first investigation, the valuation system showed more negative (N) than positive (P) valuations together with low self-enhancement (S) and contact with the other(O). The second investigation was completed after twelve months, it showed valuations associated with a rising level of S and dominance of N over P, which suggests an attitude of opposition or protest. The third investigation was performed 5 months following the second investigation. It included valuations associated with a high level of S and P and low level of N. As the research from Hermans-Jansen shows, these cases provide an understanding of the client's change as a continuous process of organization and reorganization.

Hermans illustrated a case of a 40-year-old woman who faced some troubles at school where she taught. She often found that she was a ‘in-between’ person involved in conflicts with school administrators (who happened to be her friends) and with her colleagues. She did two investigations in 9 months. Her first set of valuations generally had low levels of self-enhancement for most of her valuations. Based on the first set of valuations, her counselor designed homework to help her focus on activities to improve herself and her situation. The second case reported a 18 years old girl who was a genius in art but always struggled with identity issues and focused on death. Her first set of valuations included thoughts of her dead grandmother, valuations with low self-enhancement, high contact with others and high negative impact. This structure is typical of loving tendencies towards someone of something that is not attainable. The second SCM was implemented two years later. Her valuation changed towards increasing self-enhancement and positive contact and union with others. Altogether, these cases have shown that SCM is a useful procedure for promoting clients' insight and help them incorporate and respond to conflicting emotions in their self-statements.

In order to understand more about the unconscious aspects of valuations, Hubert Hermans and psychotherapist Els Hermans-Jansen decided to include dreams as part of self-investigation. Clients are invited to talk about a dream that they consider as important. The dream is then expressed as a successive series of ‘pictorial valuations’, which refers to Foulkes' (1978) dream studies. In this procedure the dream is treated as a series of image sentences. Dreams as private myths and myths as collective dreams are unconscious levels of human experience. The investigators derived a motivational profile from the clients' emotional rating of a myth and introduced it into the analysis matrix of 100 individual clients. The analysis of the highest relevant valuation revealed the theme of unrealized love which can be also found in the analysis of Rodin's Fugit Amor.
