= Ai Kuwabara =

Japanese jazz pianist

Ai Kuwabara (born September 21, 1991) is a modern jazz pianist from Chiba, Japan. She produces music in collaboration with bassist Yusuke Morita in a band called the ai kuwabara trio project. Her first album, from here to there debuted nationally in Japan via EWE Records in November 2012, and their second album THE SIXTH SENSE, was released in April 2013. The trio performed in the Sapporo City Jazz Festival 2013 in July and the 12th Tokyo Jazz Festival in September.

== Biography ==
Kuwabara was born on 21 September 1991 (age 34), the youngest of three girls. Older sisters Yu and Mako are also musical, and it was Mako who introduced Ai to her current musical partner Yusuke Morita, who was her classmate at the Tokyo College of Music.

Kuwabara graduated from the Music Department at Senzoku Gakuen High School as a jazz piano major in 2010 (16 years ago). She studied piano under Yuki Arimasa, Yoko Yamashita, and Kazune Zaima.

Kuwabara has won many awards, including gold medals at the All-Japan Yamaha Electone Contest, for both the lower elementary division and the upper elementary division.

Kuwabara has performed at the UNICEF Charity Concert and International Junior Original Concert. She was featured in AERA magazine as a “genius Electone girl (天才エレクトーン少女, tensai erekutōn shōjo)" (i.e., a child prodigy with respect to the Yamaha Electone).

In the middle of junior high school, Kuwabara switched to playing the piano.

Kuwabara is 1.70 metres (5 ft 7 in) tall.

== Genre ==
The ai kuwabara trio project's jazz genre is notably hard to pin down. Sean Smith, writer for the Japan Times and jazz blogger, writes that her second album blends "contemporary jazz with elements of rock and fusion sounds," though he later states that some tracks are clearly modern or contemporary jazz, "with some almost prog-rock like synths in place." Kuwabara herself states that, "I don't feel that I'm consciously playing jazz as such. Without wanting to be disrespectful to the tradition of the genre, that's not really what I'm aiming for, but that's just how my music gets categorized."

== Discography ==
The ai kuwabara trio project's first album from here to there was initially self-produced, and only later picked up by East Works Entertainment to be re-released in November 2012.

THE SIXTH SENSE, their second album (2013), was inspired by Kuwabara's interest in and study of psychology and cognitive science. "A few times I've been asked whether I've used my sixth sense to create this music," said Kuwabara in an interview with Japan Times writer Sean Smith. "But it wasn't about that, the album was more of a desire to make some music that reflected the world of the sixth sense and intuition."
