= Titti De Simone =

Italian politician (born 1970)

- Caterina De Simone

Member of the Chamber of Deputies
- In office 30 May 2001 – 28 April 2008
- Parliamentary group: PRC

Personal details
- Born: February 15, 1970 (age 56) Palermo, Italy
- Party: Communist Refoundation Party
- Occupation: Politician; journalist

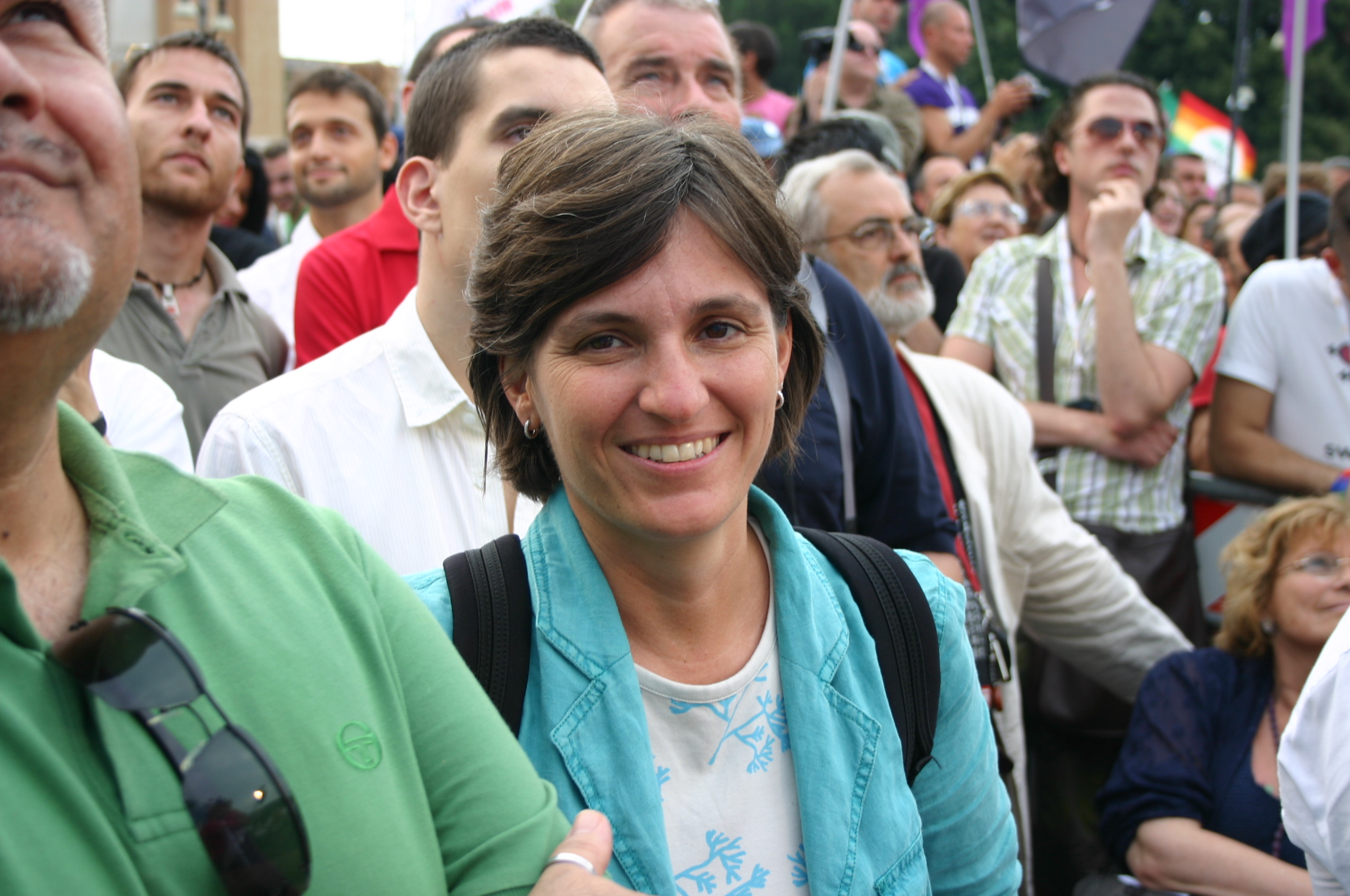
De Simone in 2007 at the Pride march in Rome

Caterina De Simone, known as Titti De Simone (born 15 February 1970) is an Italian politician and was a member of the Chamber of Deputies in the 14th and 15th parliaments from 2001 to 2008 for the Communist Refoundation Party (Rifondazione Comunista). When elected in 2001 she was the first openly lesbian member of the Chamber of Deputies.

She was born in Palermo, Sicily. She has a diploma from an istituto tecnico per il turismo and is a journalist. In July 2019, she entered into a civil union with Francesca (Chicca) Vitucci.

== Biography ==
A professional journalist since 1991, she was a young editor at the Palermo daily newspaper L'Ora, which closed in 1992. She subsequently became an activist in civil rights and LGBTQ+ movements: in 1994, she moved to Bologna, where she became vice president of the provincial Arcigay chapter and later founded Arcilesbica, serving as its president from 1996 to 2002.

In 2001, she was elected to the Chamber of Deputies (Italy) under the proportional representation system in Constituency XX (Campania 2) and joined the Communist Refoundation Party caucus. During the 14th legislature, she served on the 7th Committee (Culture, Science, and Education).

In the 2006 general election, she ran for the Chamber of Deputies as a candidate for the PRC in the Campania 1 and Emilia-Romagna districts and was re-elected to Parliament. On May 4, 2006, she was appointed Secretary to the Presidency of the Chamber of Deputies. She remained at Montecitorio until 2008.

In 2012, she served as president of the Sicilia Queer Filmfest (which takes place in Palermo in June) and edited the series I racconti di Nzocchè for the Navarra publishing house in Palermo. For the same publisher, she is editing a book dedicated to the Palermo-based director and playwright Emma Dante: an interview-based book that explores the reasons behind the cultural—as well as moral—decline afflicting Palermo, a metaphor for the country’s overall condition. With this publication, she won the 2011 Enriquez Prize for best text on socially engaged theater.

In 2013, she served as spokesperson for the National Pride event in Palermo. That same year, she joined the Democratic Party (PD) for the first time (she would later resign her membership in 2017). In 2014, she was appointed councilor for Heritage and Demographic Services for the city of Bari in Michele Emiliano administration. During the 2015 regional elections in Puglia, she was part of the staff of center-left candidate Emiliano, coordinating the platform, which was developed through a participatory process called “Le Sagre del Programma”; following the electoral victory, she was appointed the President’s Political Advisor for the implementation of the platform.

In 2022, she rejoined the Democratic Party (Italy) to support Elly Schlein’s candidacy at the party convention, during which she served as regional coordinator for the motion in Puglia. In 2023, following the conclusion of the convention, she joined the party’s national executive committee and was elected president of the PD in Bari.
