= Art Institute =

Art Institute or The Art Institute may refer to:

- The Art Institutes, a defunct franchise of for-profit art colleges with many branches in North America
- The Art Institute of Boston, part of Lesley University
- Art Institute of Chicago, a noted museum and higher education School in Chicago, Illinois
- Kansas City Art Institute, Kansas City, Missouri
- Miami International University of Art & Design, an Art Institute school in Miami, Florida
- San Francisco Art Institute, a school of higher education in contemporary art in San Francisco, California
