= Heuristic (engineering) =

In engineering, heuristics are experience-based methods used to reduce the need for calculations pertaining to equipment size, performance, or operating conditions. Heuristics are fallible and do not guarantee a correct solution. It is important to understand their limitations when applying them to different equipment and processes. Though heuristics are limited, they may be of value. This is because they offer time-saving approximations in preliminary process design.

Problem solving methods are intrinsic to forensic engineering methods, where failures are analysed for the root cause or causes. Only when failures have been investigated with conclusive results can remedial action be taken with confidence.

== Examples ==
=== Storage Vessels ===
These heuristics were taken from Turton's "Analysis, Synthesis, and Design of Chemical Processes".

- Use vertical tanks on legs when the tank is less than 3.8 m^{3}.
- Use horizontal tanks on concrete supports when the tank is between 3.8 and 38 m^{3},
- Use vertical tanks on concrete pads when the tank is beyond 38 m^{3},
- Liquids subject to breathing losses may be stored in tanks with floating or expansion roofs for conservation.
- Freeboard is 15% below 1.9 m^{3} and 10% above 1.9 m^{3}.
- Thirty-day capacity often is specified for raw materials and products, but depends on connecting transportation equipment schedules.

=== Pumps ===
These heuristics were taken from Turton's "Analysis, Synthesis, and Design of Chemical Processes".

- Centrifugal pumps: Single Stage: for of 0.057-18.9 m^{3}/min, 152 m maximum head. Multistage: for 0.076-41.6 m^{3}/min, 1675 m maximum head. Efficiency is 45% at 0.378 m^{3}/min, 70% at 1.89 m^{3}/min, 80% at 37.8 m^{3}/min.
- Axial pumps: for 0.076–378 m^{3}/min, 12 m head, 65-85% efficiency.
- Rotary pumps: for 0.00378-18.9 m^{3}/min, 15,200 m head, 50-80% efficiency.
- Reciprocating pumps: for 0.0378-37.8 m^{3}/min, 300 km head maximum. Efficiency is 70% at 7.46 kW, 85% at 37.3 kW, and 90% at 373 kW.
