= Xu Ai =

Chinese philosopher

Xu Ai (simplified Chinese: 徐爱; traditional Chinese: 徐愛; pinyin: Xú Ài; Wade–Giles: Hsü Ai; 1487–1517) was an important Chinese philosopher during the mid-late Ming Dynasty. He was also a magistrate and writer.

== Biography ==
Xu was born in Maoyan (馬堰/马堰), Yuyao, Shaoxing Fu (紹興府/绍兴府; current Yuyao, Ningbo), Zhejiang Province in 1487. His courtesy name was Yueren (曰仁), and artist's pseudonym was Hengshan (横山).

In the third year of Zhengde Era (正德三年; 1508), Xu joined the imperial examination and was qualified and matriculated as a governmental official. He was the mayor of Qizhou (祁州; current Anguo, Hebei Province). Later he was transferred to Nanjing, the sub-capital of the Ming China. In Nanjing, he chronologically served in the Ministry of Military (兵部) as a Yuanwailang (員外郎/员外郎) and in Ministry of Construction (工部) as a Langzhong (郎中) there.

In the 11th year of Zhengde Era (1516), Xu went back to hometown for mothering; and in 1517 died of illness at the age of 31.

== Philosophy ==
Xu was one of the earliest student of the philosopher Wang Yangming. He was considered as a royal, important member and the second generation of the Yangming School of Mind (陽明心學/阳明心学).

Wang Yangming proposed his thought of conscience and intuitive knowledge, but most people and Confucians during his time didn't accept it. Xu mainly contributed to the further expatiation and the consummation of Wang's philosophy in this domain, and also further developed Wang's school of philosophy.

Xu recorded most of Wang's words (from both his daily living and teaching) and works, collected and recensing them, also printed and published these philosophical monographies. So Xu also played an important role in publicizing the philosophy in a popular style.
