= A1 =

A1, A 001, A-One, or similar may refer to:

== Arts and entertainment ==
=== Film ===
- A1 Film Company, a Burmese cinema company
- A-1 Headline, a 2004 Hong Kong film
- A-1 Pictures, a Japanese animation studio
- A 001, operazione Giamaica (English title: Our Man in Jamaica), a 1965 Italian film
- A1, a 1999 Syrian film; see List of Syrian films
- A1 (2019 film), Indian Tamil film

=== Games ===
- A1 Games, an American video game publisher for the PlayStation; see List of PlayStation games (A–L)
- A-1 Supply, a former name of American gaming machine manufacturer International Game Technology
- A1 – Slave Pits of the Undercity, a component of Scourge of the Slave Lords adventure module for Dungeons & Dragons
- Larsen's Opening (ECO code: A01), a chess move
- A1, a square on a chessboard

=== Music and dance ===
==== Albums ====
- A1, by Ertuğ Ergin
- A1, by Tony Cetinski
- A One, by Ayumi Hamasaki
- A1 (album), 2002, by the British–Norwegian band A1

==== Musical artists ====
- Aone Beats or Aone, music producer
- A-1, an American rap group behind the album Mash Confusion
- A-One (band), a Mandopop group
- A1 (group), a British–Norwegian boy band
- A1 x J1, a British hip hop duo
- Floyd Bentley (born 1987), record producer and reality TV star also known as A1

==== Other uses in music and dance ====
- A1, a part in contra dance choreography
- A-1 Sound Studios, a recording studio owned by Herb Abramson

=== Radio ===
- CHIN (AM) (promotional name: A1), a station in Canada
- A1, a Slovenian radio network owned by Radiotelevizija Slovenija
- A-1 Detective Agency, a fictional detective agency in the radio series I Love a Mystery

=== Publications ===
- A1 (comics), a comics anthology
- A-1 Comics, a 1944–1955 Golden Age comics publication
- A1—The Great North Road, a book by Paul Graham

=== Television ===
- A-One (TV channel), a Russian music channel
- A-1 Pictures, a Japanese animation studio
- A1 Report, a television station in Albania
- A1 Televizija, a former channel in the Republic of North Macedonia
- America One, an American television network

=== Other uses in arts and entertainment ===
- Front of house engineer or A1, a type of sound operator
- Floyd Bentley (born 1987), record producer and reality TV star also known as A1
- A-One (graffiti artist) (born 1964) American graffiti artist

== Education ==
=== Certifications ===
- A1, the Basic Language Certificate of the Common European Framework of Reference for Languages
- A1, a baccalauréat series in the education system of some parts of France
- A1, a baccalaureate in the Gabonese education system; see Education in Gabon
- A1, the highest category of Qualified Flying Instructor in the Central Flying School of the UK Royal Air Force

=== Grades ===
- A1, a grade for the Leaving Certificate, Ireland
- A1, a grade for the Sijil Pelajaran Malaysia examination, Malaysia
- A1, a grade for the Senior Secondary Certificate Examination; see Education in Nigeria
- A1, a grade for the Singapore-Cambridge GCE Ordinary Level, Singapore
- A-1, an academic grade in Pakistan

=== Other uses in education ===
- Language A1, the former name for "Language A: literature", one of the IB Group 1 subjects
- A1, a secondary school subdivision in the Congolese education system

== Military ==
- List of A1 weapons
- A-1 Skyraider, a US military attack aircraft
- A-1 flying jacket, the predecessor of the A-2 flying jacket
- Company A-1, an outfit in the Texas A&M Corps of Cadets
- Svea Artillery Regiment, a Swedish Army regiment
- A-1 (code), the designation for a code used by the US Navy during World War I
- A1, a designation of military staff in the continental staff system
- A-1, a grade of Republic of China; see Orders, decorations, and medals of the Republic of China
- Forces A1, a naval force in the Battle of Crete; see Crete order of battle
- AMX International AMX (Brazilian Air Forces designation: A-1), an aircraft
- Kampfgeschwader 53 (identification symbol: A1), a Luftwaffe bomber wing during World War II

== Politics and government ==
- A-1 visa, a non-immigrant US visa for governmental officials
- A1, an electoral alliance in Suriname; see List of political parties in Suriname
- A1, a class of South Korean visa
- A-1, a classification in the status of Indian cities
- A1, a rank in the European Civil Service
- A1, one of the planning use classes in Wales
- A1, a classification of race by law enforcement in England and Wales

== Places ==
- A1 Mine Settlement, Victoria, Australia
- Zone A1, a zone in the Alonissos Marine Park, North Aegean Sea, Greece

== Science and technology ==
=== Astronomy ===
- A1, a stellar classification
- A1, a subobject designation; for example NGC 3603-A1

=== Biology ===
- List of A1 genes, proteins or receptors
- A1 broth, a substance used to detect fecal coliforms
- ATC code A01 Stomatological preparations, a subgroup of the Anatomical Therapeutic Chemical Classification System
- Combretastatin A1, a potent cytotoxic agent
- HLA-A1, a human leukocyte antigen serotype
- Proanthocyanidin A1, an A type proanthocyanidin
- Primary auditory cortex, the region of the cerebral cortex where sound is processed
- Vitamin A1, the animal form of vitamin A
- A1, a segment of the anterior cerebral artery
- A1, the first anal vein in the Comstock-Needham system of insect wing vein naming
- Noradrenergic cell group A1
- A1, a mating type of Phytophthora infestans, the cause of potato blight

=== Computing ===
- Acer Aspire One, a netbook computer
- A1 Superlink, an Australian Internet service provider merged in 2000 into the ISP Froggy
- A1 Telekom Austria, an Austrian mobile network operator, and its subsidiaries
  - A1 Slovenija, the second largest telecommunications company in Slovenia
  - A1 Bulgaria, mobile network operator in Bulgaria
  - A1 Hrvatska, mobile network operator in Croatia
  - A1 Belarus, mobile network operator in Belarus
  - A1 Srbija, mobile network operator in Serbia
  - A1 Macedonia, mobile network operator in North Macedonia
- A-1, a 1950s programming language successor to the A-0 System
- Windows Live OneCare (codename: A1), former computer security software
- A1, a class of computer security specified in the Trusted Computer System Evaluation Criteria
- A1 VSTi, a 2002 synthesizer software program produced by Waldorf Music

=== Earth sciences ===
- A1, a landslide classification factor
- A-1, a class in the AASHTO Soil Classification System

=== Electronics ===
- Canon A-1, a 35 mm SLR camera manufactured from 1978 to 1985
- Canon XH-A1, a handheld prosumer HDV camcorder released in 2007
- Minolta DiMAGE A1, a digital camera introduced in 2003
- Sony HVR-A1, the prosumer version of the Sony HDR-HC1 camcorder, which was introduced in 2005
- AVM A1-Card, an ISDN card produced by German company AVM GmbH
- Xiaomi Mi A1, a smartphone released in 2017, part of series Mi and Android One
- Samsung Galaxy A01, a smartphone released in 2020

=== Mathematics ===
- A¹ homotopy theory, a concept related to algebraic topology
- A1, an 1844 paper by mathematician Hermann Grassmann
- A_{1}, the alternating group on a set with one only element

=== Nuclear physics ===
- A.1 scale, an atomic time scale in the International Atomic Time standard
- A-1 (nuclear reactor), the second Soviet reactor
- KS 150 or A-1, a nuclear reactor in Czechoslovakia, decommissioned in 1979

=== Robotics ===
- A-1, the first series of Disney's Audio-Animatronics figures
- Lely Astronaut A1, the first version of the Astronaut robot manufactured by Lely

== Sports ==
- A-1 (wrestler) (born 1977), Canadian professional wrestler
- A1 Ring, the former name for the Red Bull Ring, a motorsport circuit in Spielberg, Austria
- A1 sport league (disambiguation)
- A1, a climbing grade
- A1, a ranking in Keirin track cycling
- Class A1 (baseball), a defunct classification within Minor League Baseball
- A1 (classification), an amputee sport classification
- A1 Grand Prix, a motorsport racing series
- A-1 Liga, the top basketball league in Croatia
- HEBA A1, the top basketball league in Greece
- Phase A1, a phase in a combined driving equestrian competition

== Transportation ==
=== Land transportation ===
==== Cars ====
- A1 Grand Prix car
- Anadol A1, a 1966 Turkish car
- Arrows A1, a 1978 British racing car
- Audi A1, a supermini automobile produced from 2010
- Audi Quattro A1, a 1983 rally car
- Chery A1
- Scania A1, 1901
- Toyota A1, 1935, prototype
- A1, a Volkswagen Group A platform
- A-1, a 1939 Buick Roadmaster Series 81C used by Norwegian royalty

==== Motorcycles ====
- A1, a Haden frame
- A1, a Motosacoche motorcycle
- A-1, a 1976 Alligator
- Automatic A1, a Tomos motorcycle
- A1 Samurai, in the list of Kawasaki motorcycles

==== Other uses in land transportation ====
- Ayrshire Bus Owners (A1 Service), a bus operator in Scotland
- A1, a tyre code
- A1 registration plate, a UK vehicle registration plate

==== Rail ====
===== Trains =====
- A1-class Melbourne tram
- Bavarian A I, an 1844 German steam locomotive model
- Ceylon Government Railway A1, steam locomotive class
- LB&SCR A1 class, a class of locomotives designed by Stroudley and known as the Terriers
- LNER Gresley Classes A1 and A3, a locomotive class designed by Sir Nigel Gresley, including the Flying Scotsman
- LNER Thompson Class A1/1, the rebuild of 4470 Great Northern by Edward Thompson
- LNER Peppercorn Class A1, a class of Pacific locomotives designed by Arthur Peppercorn
- NCC Class A1, 1901 Irish 4-4-0 passenger steam locomotives
- Pennsylvania Railroad class A1, an American PRR steam locomotive
- Prussian A 1, a 1907 German Prussian railbus
- SP&S Class A1, a 1907 steam locomotives class
- Type A1, a type of electric tram in Adelaide, Australia
- A1 (Guangzhou Metro car), model used on Guangzhou Metro Line 1

===== Other uses in rail =====
- A1 Steam Locomotive Trust, a charitable trust
- Nishi-magome Station (station number: A-01), a Japanese subway station
- RER A1, a branch of the RER A rapid transit line in France, to Saint-Germain-en-Laye station
- Tel Aviv–Jerusalem railway, built on the "A1 Route"
- 0-2-2 (UIC classification: A1), locomotive wheel arrangements

=== Air and space transportation ===
==== Aircraft ====
- Jet A-1, a type of aviation fuel
- List of A1 aircraft
- A-1 (airship)
- Douglas A-1 Skyraider, an American single-seat attack aircraft
- Albastar A1, a glider
- Model 3 A-1, an Aeronautical Products rotorcraft; see List of rotorcraft
- Antigravity A1, a Chinese teleoperated quadcopter drone produced by Antigravity, a subsidiary of Insta360
- AMX International AMX (Brazilian Air Forces designation: A-1)

==== Spacecraft ====
===== Rockets and launches =====
- A1, a model of German Aggregate series rocket from World War II
- Hermes A-1, a rocket in the Hermes project
- Saturn A-1, a 1959 American rocket
- Scout A-1, a 1965 American rocket
- A-001, the second abort test of the Apollo spacecraft

===== Satellites =====
- Anik A1, a Canadian satellite
- Aussat (Optus) A1, a 1985 Australian telecommunications satellite
- Orbcomm A1, a 1997 American low Earth orbit communications satellite
- Palapa A1, the first 1976 Indonesian Palapa satellite
- Superbird A1, put into orbit by an Ariane launch in 1992
- Astérix (satellite) or A1, the first French satellite

=== Water transportation ===
==== Surface vessels ====
- A-1 lifeboat
- USS A-1, several US Navy ships
- ARA Comandante General Irigoyen (A-1), an Argentine Navy auxiliary ship

==== Submarines ====
- HMS A1, a British A-class submarine of the Royal Navy
- Type A1 submarine, a type of Japanese Navy submarine
- HNoMS Kobben (A-1), a Royal Norwegian Navy submarine

==== Other uses in water transportation ====
- A1 (shipping), a symbol indicating shipbuilding quality
- Sea Area A1, a designation in the Global Maritime Distress Safety System

== Other uses ==
- A1 paper size (59.4×84.1 centimetres or 23.4×33.1 inches)
- A1 or A-1, two investment grades for bonds
- A1, a country risk rating assigned by Compagnie Française d'Assurance pour le Commerce Extérieur
- A.1. Sauce, a brand of brown sauce
- A1, a colour grade used in shrimp marketing

== See also ==
- 1A (disambiguation)
- A-1 Yola (disambiguation)
- AL (disambiguation)
- Alpha 1 (disambiguation)
- Aleph One (disambiguation)
- A10 (disambiguation)
