= AL =

AL, Al, Ål or al may refer to:

== Arts and entertainment ==
=== Fictional characters ===
- Al (Aladdin) or Aladdin, the main character in Disney's Aladdin media
- Al (EastEnders), a minor character in the British soap opera
- Al (Fullmetal Alchemist) or Alphonse Elric, a character in the manga/anime
- Al Borland, a character in the Home Improvement universe
- Al Bundy, a character in the television series Married... with Children
- Al Calavicci, a character in the television series Quantum Leap
- Al McWhiggin, a supporting villain of Toy Story 2
- Al, or Aldebaran, a character in Re:Zero − Starting Life in Another World media

=== Music ===
- A L, an EP by French singer Amanda Lear

== Mythology and religion ==
- Al (folklore), a spirit in Persian and Armenian mythology
- Al Basty, a tormenting female night demon in Turkish folklore
- Liber AL, the central sacred text of Thelema

== Organisations ==
=== Government, military and political ===
- Arab League, a regional organisation of 22 Arab states
- Alternative List, a Swiss political party
- Armia Ludowa (People's Army), the Soviet-backed Polish army in World War II
- Assembleia Legislativa (disambiguation)
- Awami League, a political party in Bangladesh
- Angkatan Laut (Indonesian for "Naval Force"), common initialism associated with the Indonesian Navy

=== Sports ===
- A Lyga, top division association football league in Lithuania
- American League, part of Major League Baseball
- Asia League Ice Hockey
- Airtricity League, the official name of the League of Ireland

== People and anthroponymy ==
- Al (given name), list of people named Al
- Amelia Lehmann (pseudonym A. L., 1838–1903), British composer
- Al (Arabic: آل) (meaning "family of"), used in some family names by important dynasties in Arabic; see Arabic names

== Places ==
=== Americas ===
- Alabama (postal abbreviation: AL), a US state
- Alagoas, a state of Brazil
- Allen County, Kansas (county code: AL), US

=== Europe ===
- Albania (ISO 3166 code)
- Province of Alessandria (ISO 3166-2:IT code), a province of Italy
- AL postcode area, St Albans, UK
- Ål, a municipality in Norway

=== Elsewhere ===
- Algeria (WMO country code)
- Al, Iran, a village
- Al, Yenişehir, a neighbourhood in Turkey

== Science and technology ==
=== Computing ===
- .al, Internet top-level domain name for Albania
- AL register, the low byte of an X86 16-bit AX register
- AL language, a proprietary programming language to customize the software Microsoft Dynamics 365 Business Central

=== Other uses in science and technology ===
- -al, a suffix used in organic chemistry
- Aluminium (symbol Al), a chemical element
- Allylescaline, a psychedelic drug
- A_{L}, a measure of inductance in a magnetic core

== Transport ==
- AL (automobile), a French hybrid car in 1907
- Almanor Railroad (reporting mark: AL), California, US
- Malta Air (IATA code: AL), a Maltese airline subsidiary of Ryanair Holdings
- TransAVIAexport Airlines (former IATA code: AL), Minsk, Belarus (since 1992)
- Allegheny Airlines (former IATA code: AL), Virginia, US (1953-1979)
- Skyway Airlines (former IATA code: AL), Wisconsin, US (1994-2008)

== Education ==
- A-level (A/L), in UK education
- Hong Kong Advanced Level Examination, a standardized examination from 1980 to 2011
- Singapore-Cambridge GCE Advanced Level，a standardized examination in Singapore

== Other uses ==
- Al- (Arabic: ال), the Arabic definite article
- Anno Lucis, a dating system used in Freemasonry

== See also ==
- Artificial life (ALife or A-Life)
- A1 (disambiguation)
- Ai (disambiguation)
- El (disambiguation)
- L (disambiguation)
- AAL (disambiguation)
- All (disambiguation)
