= Shipwrecking =

Event causing a ship to wreck

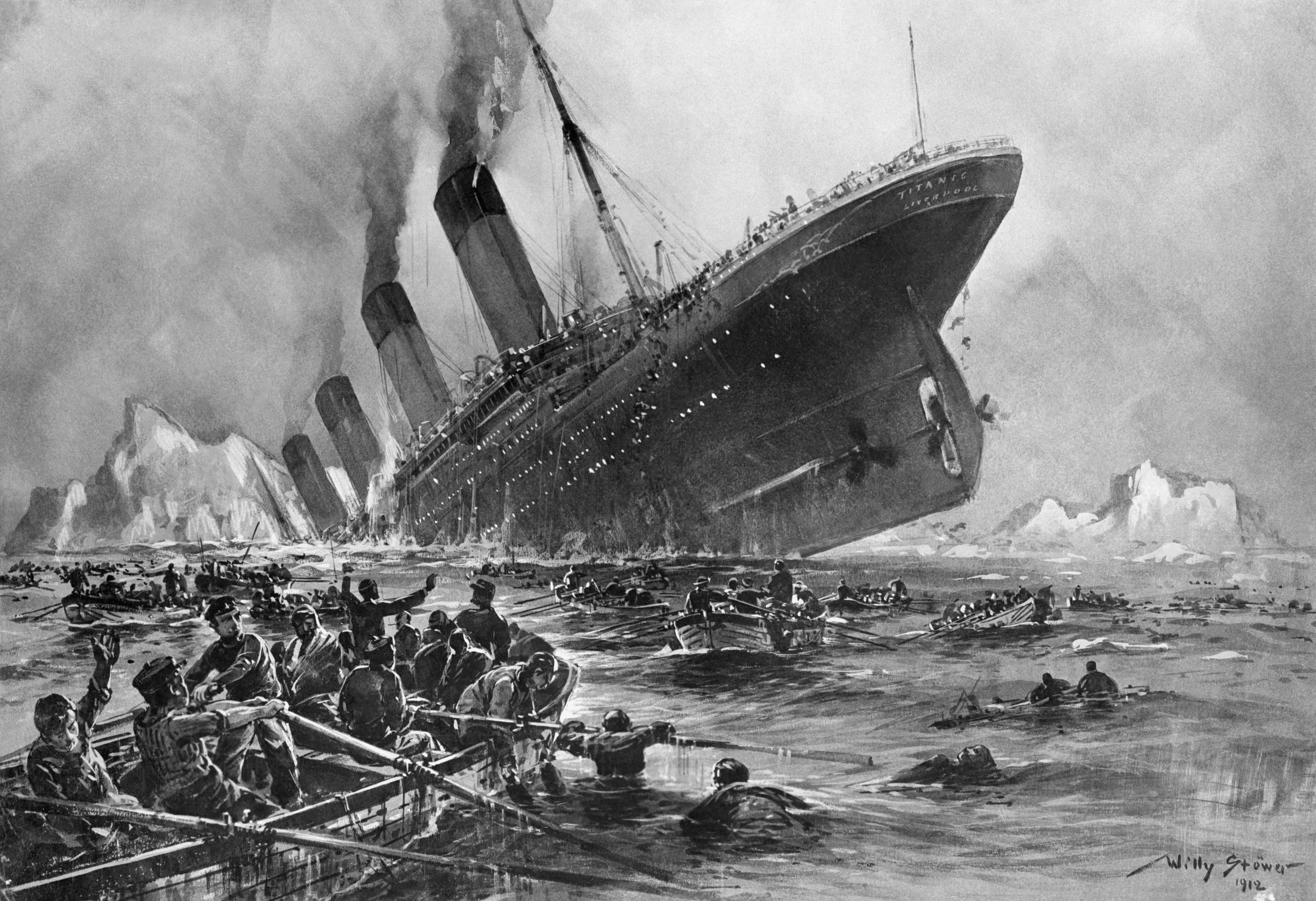
The sinking of the Titanic, illustrated by Willy Stöwer in 1912

Shipwrecking is an event in which a ship is wrecked by running aground or sinking. The resulting physical remains of a wrecked ship are called a shipwreck or wreckage.

== Causes ==
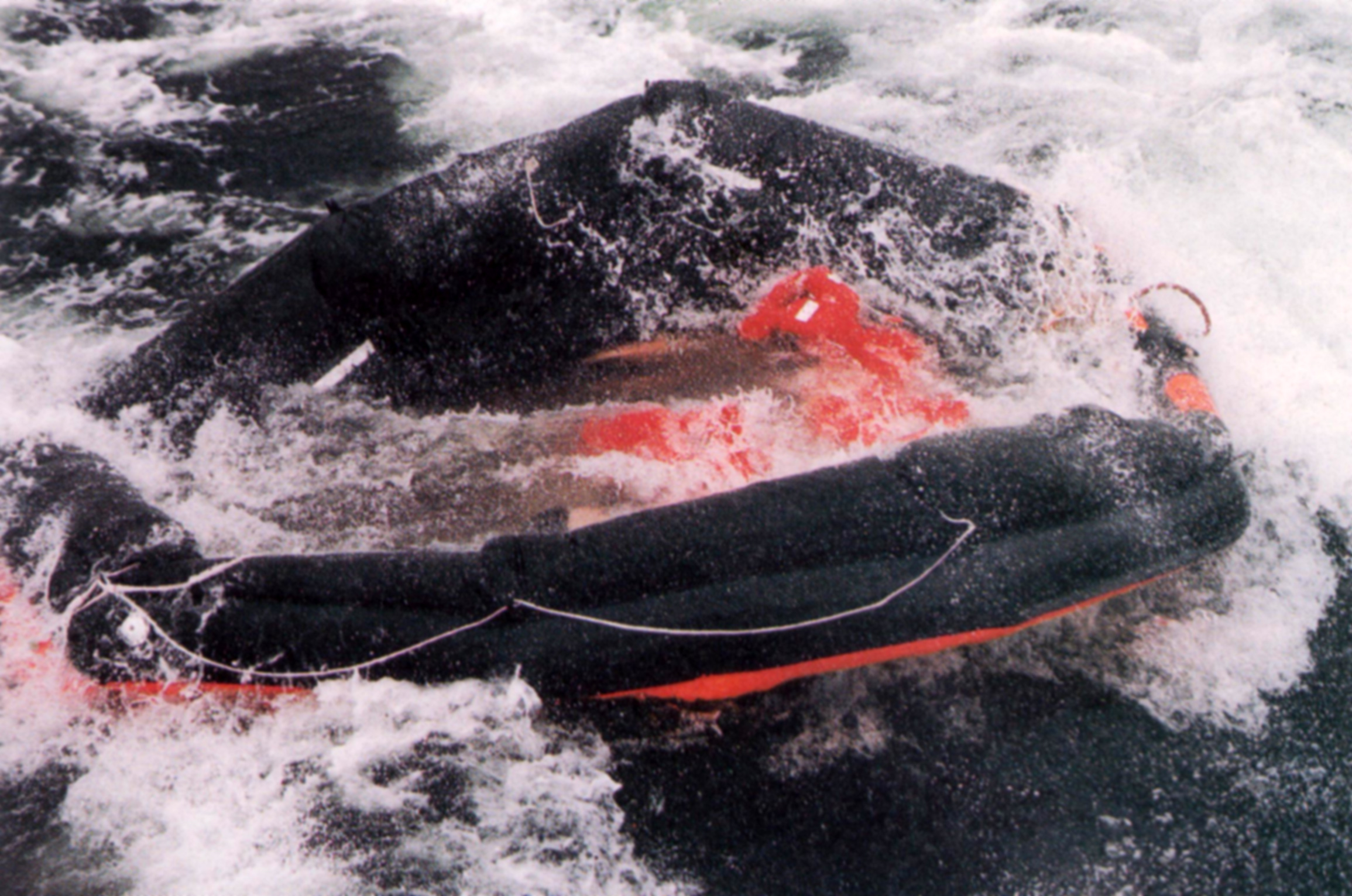
Life raft from MS Estonia, which sank in the Baltic Sea in 1994

Shipwrecks can occur due to several factors, including collisions that cause a ship to flood and sink, stranding on rocks, land, or shoals, poor maintenance resulting in a lack of seaworthiness, or destruction of a ship either intentionally or by severe weather. Factors in the loss of a ship may include:

- Poor design or failure of the ship's equipment or hull (including the pressure hull)
- Instability due to poor design, improperly stowed cargo, shifting cargo, or the free surface effect
- Navigation errors and other human errors, leading to collisions (with another ship, rocks, or an iceberg, as with RMS Titanic) or running aground (as with Costa Concordia)
- Bad weather, including large waves or gale winds, leading to a vessel being swamped, holed on rocks or reefs, or capsizing (also referred to as foundering)
- Warfare, piracy, mutiny, or sabotage, including guns, torpedoes, depth charges, mines, bombs, and missiles
- Fire damage
- Biofouling, such as the accumulation of polychaetes and other tube worms on wooden hulls
- Overloading (either cargo or ice accumulation), with displacement exceeding the Plimsoll line
- Intentional sinking (scuttling)
  - To form artificial reefs
  - For wreck diving
  - Use as a target ship for training or weapons testing
  - As a blockship to create an obstacle to close a harbor or river against enemy ships
  - To prevent a ship from falling into enemy hands (e.g. Admiral Graf Spee)
  - To destroy a derelict ship that poses a hazard to navigation
  - As part of insurance fraud

=== Design and equipment failure ===
One of the best-known examples of a shipwreck due to poor design is the capsizing of the Swedish warship Vasa in Stockholm harbour in 1628. She was unstable due to insufficient beam for her weight distribution, and her lower gun deck had too little freeboard for seaworthiness.

Poor design allowed the ferry Herald of Free Enterprise to put to sea with open roll-on/roll-off bow doors, with tragic consequences. Failure or leaking of the hull is a serious problem that can lead to the loss of buoyancy or stability due to the free surface effect and the subsequent sinking or capsizing of the vessel. The hulls of large modern ships have even cracked in severe storms.

Equipment failure caused the shipwreck of the cruiseferry Estonia in 1994. The stress of stormy seas on the hull and especially the bow caused the bow visor to break off, in turn tearing the watertight bow door open and letting seawater flow onto the car deck. She capsized with tragic consequences. Failure of pumps can lead to the loss of a potentially salvageable ship with only a minor leak or fire.

Failure of propulsion systems, such as engines, sails, or rigging, can lead to the loss of a ship. When the ship's movement is determined only by currents or the wind and particularly by storms, a common result is that the ship is unable to avoid natural hazards like rocks, shallow water or tidal races. Loss of propulsion or steering can inhibit a ship's ability to safely position itself in a storm, even far from land. Waves repeatedly attacking a ship's side can also overwhelm and sink it.

=== Instability and foundering ===
Instability is caused by the center of mass of the ship rising above the metacenter, resulting in the ship tipping on its side or capsizing. To remain buoyant, the hull of a vessel must prevent water from entering the large air spaces of the vessel (known as downflooding). For the ship to float, the normally submerged parts of the hull must be watertight, but the upper parts of the hull must have openings to allow ventilation of compartments, including the engine room, for crew access, and to load and unload cargo. During swamping by waves or capsize, water can enter these openings if they are not watertight. If a ship sinks after capsizing, or as a consequence of being overwhelmed by waves, a leak in the hull, or other water ingress, it may be described as having foundered. Large ships are designed with compartments to help preserve buoyancy.

=== Bad weather ===
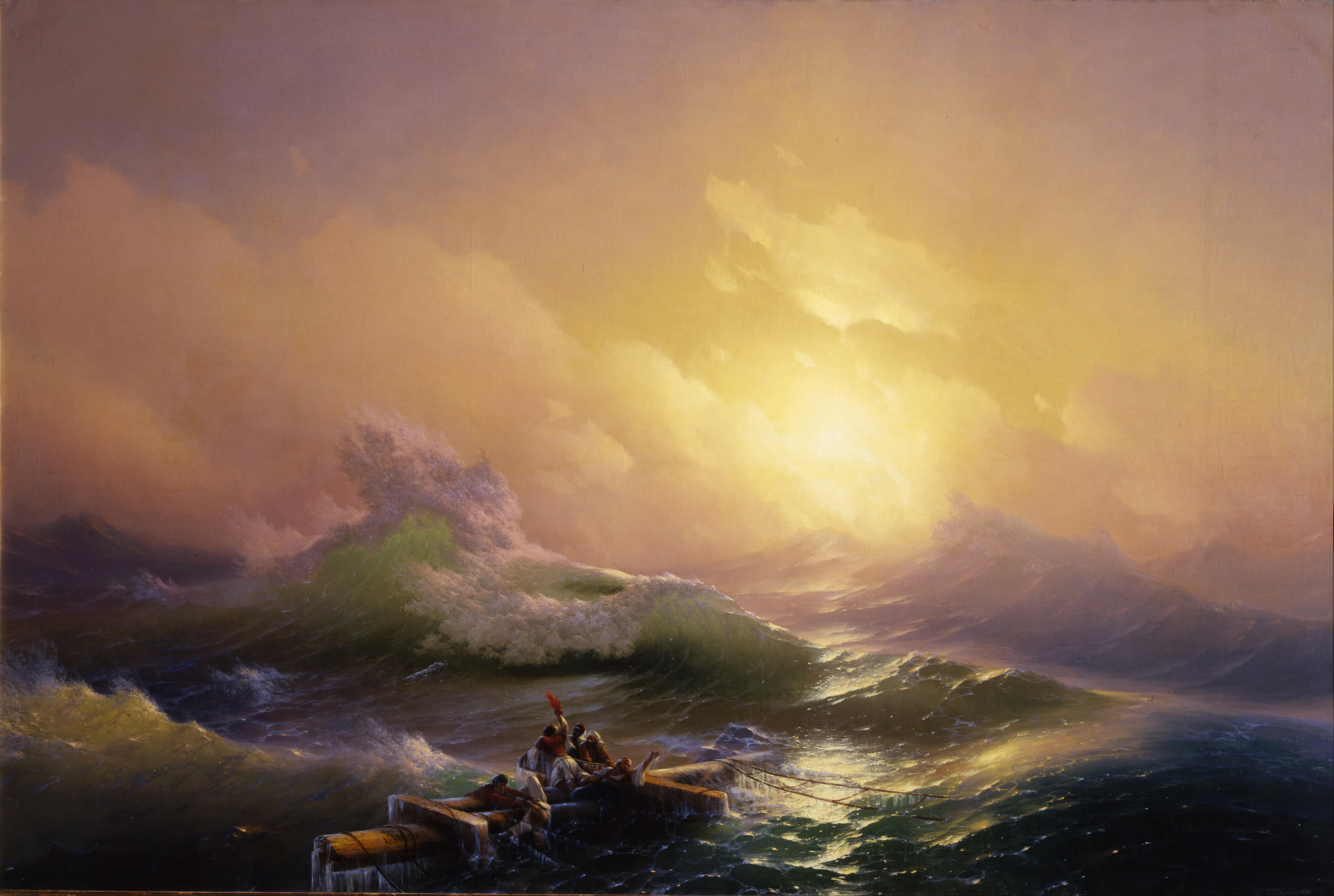
Ivan Aivazovsky's The Ninth Wave painting (1850) shows a handful of survivors clinging to the mast of a sunken ship.

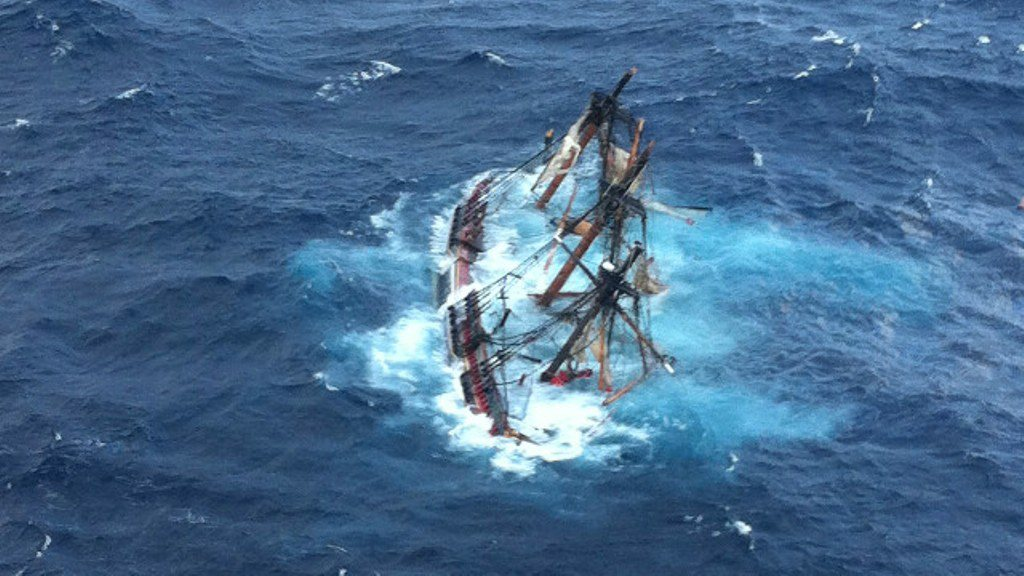
Bounty awash in the Atlantic Ocean during Hurricane Sandy approximately 90 miles southeast of Hatteras, N.C., 29 October 2012

On 25 October 2012, the tall ship Bounty (a replica of HMS Bounty) sank in a hurricane. The vessel left New London, Connecticut, heading for St. Petersburg, Florida, initially taking an easterly course to avoid Hurricane Sandy. On 29 October 2012 at 03:54 EDT, the ship's owner called the United States Coast Guard for help after losing contact with the ship's master during the hurricane. He reported that the vessel was taking on water off the coast of North Carolina, about 160 miles (260 km) from the storm, and that the crew were preparing to abandon ship. There were sixteen people aboard, two of whom did not survive the sinking. An inquiry into the sinking was held by the United States Coast Guard in Portsmouth, Virginia, from 12 to 21 February 2013, at which it was concluded that Captain Walbridge's decision to sail the ship into the path of Hurricane Sandy was the cause, and the inquiry found this to have been a "reckless decision".

Poor weather can cause several problems:

- High winds
- Low visibility
- Cold weather
- High waves

Wind generates waves, which create additional hazards. Waves make navigation difficult and dangerous in shallow water. Waves also create buoyancy stresses on the structure of a hull. The weight of breaking waves on the structure of the ship forces the crew to reduce speed or even travel in the same direction as the waves to prevent damage. Wind also stresses the rigging of sailing ships.

The force of the wind pushes ships in its direction of flow. Vessels with large windage are most affected. Although powered ships are able to resist the force of the wind, sailing vessels have few defenses against strong winds. When strong winds are imminent, sailing vessels typically have several choices:

- Position themselves to avoid being blown into danger
- Shelter in a harbor
- Anchor, preferably on the leeward side of a landform

Many losses of sailing ships were caused by sailing with a following wind so far into a bay that the ship became trapped upwind of a lee shore, unable to sail into the wind to leave the bay. Low visibility caused by fog, mist, and heavy rain increases the navigator's problems. Cold can cause metal to become brittle and fail more easily. A build-up of ice can cause instability by accumulating high on the ship or, in severe cases, can crush the hull if the ship becomes trapped in a freezing sea.

=== Rogue waves ===
According to one scientist who studies rogue waves, "Two large ships sink every week on average, but the cause is never studied to the same detail as an air crash. It simply gets put down to 'bad weather'." Once considered mythical and lacking hard evidence for their existence, rogue waves are now known to exist and are recognized as a natural ocean phenomenon. Eyewitness accounts from mariners and damage inflicted on ships have long suggested that they occur; however, their existence was only scientifically confirmed following measurements of the "Draupner wave", a rogue wave at the Draupner platform in the North Sea on 1 January 1995, with a maximum wave height of 25.6 meters (84 ft) (peak elevation of 18.5 meters (61 ft)). During that event, minor damage was also inflicted on the platform, far above sea level, confirming that the reading was valid. Their existence has since also been confirmed by satellite imagery of the ocean surface.

=== Fire ===
Fire can cause the loss of ships in many ways. The most obvious way would be the loss of a wooden ship which is burned until watertight integrity is compromised (e.g. Cospatrick). The detonation of cargo or ammunition can breach a steel hull. Extreme temperatures may compromise the structural properties of steel, causing the hull to break on its own weight. A large fire may cause a ship to be abandoned and left to drift (e.g. MS Achille Lauro). If it runs aground beyond economic salvage, it becomes a wreck.

In extreme cases, where the ship's cargo is either highly combustible (such as oil, natural gas or gasoline) or explosive (nitrates, fertilizers, ammunition) a fire on board may result in a catastrophic conflagration or explosion. Such events may have catastrophic results, especially if they occur in a harbor, such as the Halifax Explosion.

=== Navigation errors ===
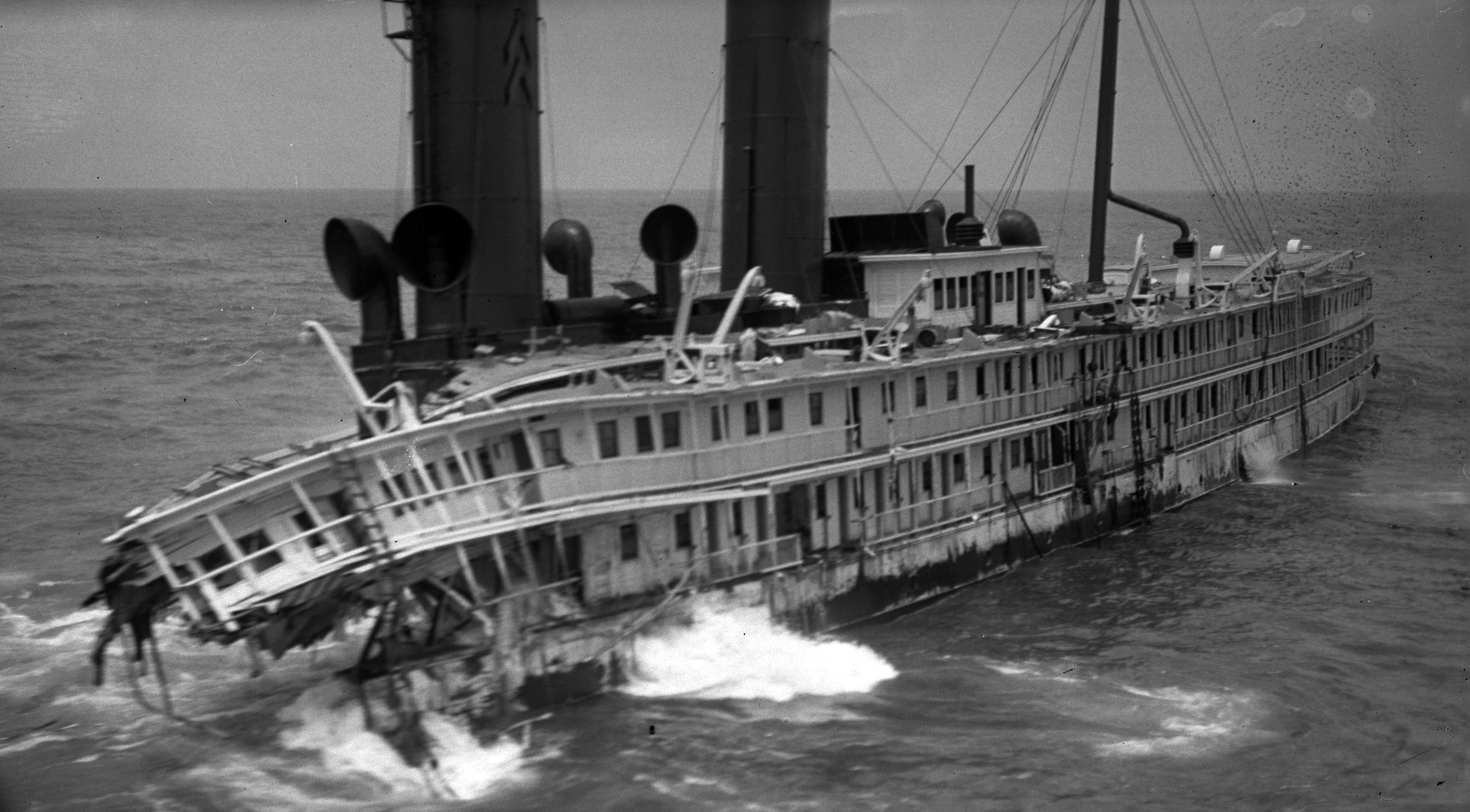
Shipwreck of SS Harvard on Point Arguello, California, 1931

Many shipwrecks occur when a ship's crew allows the vessel to collide with rocks, reefs, icebergs, or other ships. Collisions have been one of the major causes of shipwrecks. Accurate navigation is made more difficult by poor visibility in adverse weather conditions. Many losses occurred before modern navigation aids such as GPS, radar, and sonar were available. Until the 20th century, the most sophisticated navigational tools and techniques available—dead reckoning using the magnetic compass, the marine chronometer (to calculate longitude), a ship's logbook (which recorded the vessel's heading and speed measured by chip log), and celestial navigation using marine chronometer and sextant—were sufficiently accurate for ocean voyages, but these techniques (and, in many cases, the charts) lacked the precision to avoid reefs close to shore.

The Scilly naval disaster of 1707, which claimed nearly 2,000 lives and was one of the greatest maritime disasters in the history of the British Isles, has been attributed to the mariners' inability to determine their longitude. This led to the Longitude Act to improve the aids available for navigation. Marine chronometers were as revolutionary in the 19th century as GPS is today. However, the cost of these instruments could be prohibitive, sometimes resulting in tragic consequences for ships that were still unable to determine their longitude, as in the case of the Arniston.

Even today, when highly accurate navigational equipment is readily available and widely used, there is still scope for error. Using an incorrect horizontal datum for a chart may mislead the navigator, especially as many charts have not been updated to modern data standards. It is also important for navigators to recognize that charts may be significantly in error, especially on less frequented coasts. For example, a recent revision of the map of South Georgia in the South Atlantic showed that previous maps were, in some places, inaccurate by several kilometers.

Over the centuries, many technological and organizational developments have been used to reduce accidents at sea, including:

- International Regulations for Preventing Collisions at Sea
- Pilotage aids, including lighthouses and sea marks
- Basic navigation tools such as the magnetic compass, nautical chart, marine chronometer, sextant, log, and sounding line
- Advanced navigation tools such as radio communication, radar navigation, the gyrocompass, sonar, hyperbolic radio navigation, and satellite navigation
- Inspection of shipbuilding quality and maintenance of seaworthiness, such as "A1 at Lloyd's"
- Intelligence and better defenses to protect ships from acts of violence, war, and piracy
- Use of fireproof or nonflammable materials to prevent fires from spreading rapidly, and modern firefighting agents such as gases and foams that do not compromise the buoyancy and stability of the vessel as quickly as water
- Built-in devices to delay flooding long enough for rescue ships to retrieve survivors or tow the ship to the nearest shipyard for repairs, such as watertight compartments and pumps

== See also ==
- Flotsam and jetsam
- List of shipwrecks
- List of disasters
- List of maritime disasters
- Beaching (nautical)
