= List of A1 weapons =

This is a list of weapons or firearms designated A1 or A-1 :

- M121/A1 155mm Cartridge, a U.S. army chemical artillery shell
- Arsenal SLR-105 A1, a semi-automatic US import version of AK-74 and its airsoft gun model, the SLR105 A1

== Grenade launchers ==
- Heckler & Koch HK69A1, a German 40 mm grenade launcher
- L1 A1 (grenade thrower), a simply developed military weapon for firing shells

== Machine guns ==
- HK21A1 and HK11A1, two variants of the German Heckler & Koch HK21 machine gun
- M1917A1, a variant of the American M1917 Browning machine gun

== Submachine guns ==
- M-10A1, a variant of the 1970 United States MAC-10 submachine gun
- M1921A1, M1928A1 and M1A1, three variants of the American Thompson submachine gun
- M3A1, a variant of the American M3 submachine gun
- MP5KA1, a variant of the 1964 German Heckler & Koch MP5 submachine gun
- MP7A1, a variant of the German Heckler & Koch MP7 submachine gun

== Mines ==
- DM-39A1 and DM-68A1, two variants of the German anti-personnel DM-39 mine
- M18A1 Claymore Antipersonnel Mine, an American directional anti-personnel mine
- MBV-78-A1 mine, a Vietnamese variant of Russian POMZ anti-personnel mine

== Missiles ==
- A1, a German rocket design in the Aggregate series from the 1930s
- a1 Husayn, an Iraqi indigenously produced Scud-type missile
- a1 Samoud, an Iraqi short-range ballistic missile
- Polaris A1, a 1932 German missile
- AGM-154A-1 (JSOW-A1), a variant of the American AGM-154 Joint Standoff Weapon missile
- SS.11A1 XAGM-22A, a variant of the 1953 French Nord SS.11 surface-to-surface wire-guided anti-tank missile

== Pistols ==
- M-A1 series, an Austrian Steyr M pistol series
- M1911A1, a version of the American M1911 pistol
- M9A1, a version of the Italian M9 pistol
- SIG Sauer P225-A1 revision of the original P225, also designated the P6, as used by German law enforcement.
- SIG Sauer M11-A1 upgraded variant of P229

== Rifles ==
- C8A1, a variant of the C8 Rifle
- FN A1, a variant of the Belgian FN Special Police rifle
- L1 A1, a British self load rifle
- L96A1, a variant of the 1982 British Accuracy International Arctic Warfare sniper rifle
- M82A1, a variant of the 1989 American Barrett M82 rifle
- L85A1, L86A1 LSW, L22A1, L98A1 CGP, variants of the British SA80 rifle
- M16A1, a version of the American M16 rifle
- M1903A1, a variant of the American M1903 Springfield rifle
- M4A1, a variant of the M4 Carbine
- M82A1, M82A1A and M82A1M, three variants of the American Barrett M82 rifle
- M96-A1, a variant of the American Robinson Armaments M96 Expeditionary rifle
- PSG1A1, a variant of the German Heckler & Koch PSG1 sniper rifle
- Steyr AUG A1, a variant of the Austrian 5.56 mm assault rifle

== Robots ==
- Samsung SGR-A1, a South Korean military robot sentry

== Shotguns ==
- Parker Reproduction A1 Special, a shotgun engraver by Master Engraver Geoffroy Gournet
- Mossberg 590 A1, a shot gun intended for military use
