= Karl Suleman =

- Born: 16 April 1961; Baghdad, Iraq
- Died: 20 June 2013 (aged 52); Sydney, Australia
- Occupation: Froggy Chief Executive Officer
- Children: 2

Karl Suleman was the director of KSE (Karl Suleman Enterprises) and all the companies within the Froggy Group. He was part of the largest Ponzi scheme in Australian history which was associated with budget internet company Froggy, fronted by Suleman and funded with the help of $300 million raised from 20,000 investors.

== Early life ==
Born in Iraq on 16 April 1961 to an Assyrian family, Suleman, was only two years old when his father Emanuel, an air force captain, died in a plane crash. His mother Najiba, widowed at the age of 19, brought him to Australia in 1976 to live with his uncle. After leaving school Suleman worked as a storeman and packer. In 1989 he bought a 7-Eleven store and a second one in the early 1990s. It was also about that time that he saw there was money to be made in the retrieval of shopping trolleys, in early 2000s suleman launched his internet company Froggy.

== KSE scheme ==
On 30 July 2002, Suleman the co-founder of froggy internet was declared bankrupt, the Australian Securities & Investments Commission (ASIC) alleging that around 11 December 2000, Suleman used a false bank statement, which he gave to a finance broker, with the intention of obtaining finance in the amount of $355,000 to purchase a Ferrari F355.

between 1 March 2001 and 16 October 2001, on three separate occasions, Suleman made false statements to finance brokers with the intention of obtaining finance to purchase a $3.3 million Princess Motor yacht and a $360,000 Ferrari Modena.

Suleman enterprises were placed into voluntary administration on 12 November 2001, soon after ASIC commenced proceedings before the Supreme Court of New South Wales to close down an unregistered managed investment scheme operated by the company. KSE and several related companies within the Froggy Group were placed into liquidation.

On 22 July 2002, Suleman was ordered to pay $17.4 million in damages to KSE.

Suleman had tapped into Sydney's Assyrian community, many of whom had remortgaged their homes.

In April 2004, Suleman was jailed for 21 months, with a 12-month non-parole period, for four fraud offences.

== Trolley business ==
Two days shy of being released from a 21-month jail term in 2005 the corporate regulator struck again, laying 26 new charges.

Karl Suleman Enterprizes fleeced 2,062 investors who committed $130.7 million between them – by inviting them to invest in a trolley collection business that promised investors returns of 100 percent a year.

But instead of their money going into that business, the money was used to fund Suleman's extravagant lifestyle.

Suleman and his wife Vivienne bought properties, luxury cars, boats, and planes, sponsored charity events, and gave lavish gifts as well as dinners for former United States presidents George Bush and Bill Clinton.

Some of the money was used to service a $13 million loan taken out to finance a range of IT and mobile phone ventures under the Froggy Group banner.

Documents filed with the court by the ASIC showed that investors, mostly from Sydney's Assyrian community, were induced to put between $50,000 and $150,000 into the trolley business on the promise that they would receive fortnightly returns of between $4000 and $25,000.

While investors received some fortnightly payments as promised, the money earned by the trolley collection business fell well short of being sufficient to sustain the promised payments.

The company's liquidators said in their report that between July 2000 and November 2001 the business made a net profit of $275,096 but was paying out $2 million a week to investors seeking high returns.

Suleman started the trolley business in 1993, providing trolley collections from supermarkets stretching from Cairns to Adelaide. Supermarkets paid Suleman an agreed fee out of which he paid subcontractors to do the work.

The District Court heard 15 people invested more than $3 million in Suleman's supermarket trolley collection business in 2000 and 2001.

Thirteen of them lost a total of more than $800,000.

The founder of the Froggy Group – was sentenced to seven and a half years in jail after pleading guilty to 26 charges.

The judge found Suleman knew the income from his business was not enough to repay the investors.

He said it was a serious white-collar crime, and that Suleman had breached the trust of naive investors so he could live a lifestyle far beyond his legitimate income.

== Death ==
Two years after being released from jail on 20 June 2013, 52-year-old Suleiman died after suffering a heart attack at his home in Horningsea Park Sydney.
