= A1 broth =

An A1 broth is a liquid culture medium used in microbiology for the detection of fecal coliforms in foods, treated wastewater and seawater bays using the most probable number (MPN) method. It is prepared according to the formulation of Andrews and Presnell given below. It is used with a Durham tube, a positive tube being one that exhibits a trapped bubble of gas.

== Typical formula (g/L) ==
Tryptone	20.0
Lactose	5.0
Sodium chloride	5.0
Triton X-100	1.0
Salicin	0.5

== Directions ==
Suspend the dry ingredients in one liter of cold distilled water. Gently heat until completely dissolved and distribute 9 mL into test tubes with an inverted Durham tube. Sterilize in an autoclave at 121°C for 15 minutes. If needed, prepare multi-strength broth weighing the appropriate quantity of the dry medium. The final pH is 6.9 ± 0.1.

== Widespread usage ==
Variants of this test has been used for potable water across the globe, for example by the Cree community of Split Lake, Manitoba, by the Mapuche people of Maquehue, Chile and in Singapore, Malaysia and Thailand
