= Alpha 1 =

Alpha 1 or Alpha-1 may refer to:

- Alpha-1 adrenergic receptor, a G protein-coupled receptor
- Alpha-1 antitrypsin, a protein
  - Alpha-1 antitrypsin deficiency, a genetic disorder
- Alpha-1-fetoprotein or Alpha-fetoprotein, a protein
- Alpha-One, a fictional spacecraft in Buzz Lightyear of Star Command: The Adventure Begins
- Alpha 1 (Robert Silverberg anthology), a 1970 book
- Alpha-1 Wrestling, a professional wrestling promotion

== See also ==
- A1 (disambiguation)
- Alpha (disambiguation)
- AMY1A or Alpha-1A or, an enzyme found in humans and other mammals
- List of A1 genes, proteins or receptors
