= USS A-1 =

The name USS A-1 may refer to the following ships of the United States Navy:

- USS Plunger (SS-2), the lead vessel of Plunger-class submarines
- USS A-1 (SP-1370), a houseboat taken over by the United States Navy in 1917

== See also ==
- A1 (disambiguation), for other ships named A1
