= List of A1 aircraft =

This is a list of aircraft designated A1, A.1, A.I, A 1 or A-1:

== Civilian aircraft ==
- Albastar A1, Slovenian glider
- Andrews A1, an unsuccessful New Zealand agricultural aircraft
- Aviat A1 Husky, a 1987 American two seat, high wing, utility light aircraft
- CallAir A-1, a version of the 1940 American CallAir Model A utility aircraft
- Curtiss A-1, a 1911 American aircraft
- Eagle Model A-1, a three-place biplane open-cockpit aircraft made by American Eagle Aircraft Corporation
- Gotha A.I, a 1910 German Rumpler Taube model
- Pfalz A.I, a World War I German Idflieg A-class designation aircraft

== Military aircraft ==
- A-1 Skyraider, a United States Air Force/Navy single engine propeller driven attack aircraft
- Alcock Scout also known as Alcock A.1, a one-off 1917 British fighter biplane assembled from elements of other fighter aircraft
- Alter A.1, a 1917 German single-seat biplane fighter aircraft
- Ansaldo A.1 Balilla, a 1917 Italian fighter aircraft
- Arpin A-1, a 1938 unorthodox monoplane aircraft submitted to the British Army
- Fokker A.I, a 1910s German two-seat observation aircraft
- Morane-Saulnier AI, a 1917 French parasol-wing fighter aircraft
- SPAD A-1, a French Société Pour L'Aviation et ses Dérivés airplane, prototype for the 1915 SPAD A.2 fighter-reconnaissance aircraft
- A-1, a designation in the Brazilian Air Force for the AMX International AMX fighter aircraft

== Gliders ==
- Antonov A-1, a 1930s Soviet Union family of single-seat training gliders
- Levasseur-Abrial A-1, a 1922 French glider
