= DM-39 mine =

DM-39
- Type: Blast mine, antipersonel
- Place of origin: Germany

Service history
- Used by: German Army

Production history
- Variants: DM-39A1, DM-68, DM-68A1 (training only)

Specifications
- Mass: 480 g
- Height: 40 mm
- Diameter: 10 cm
- Effective firing range: 30 m
- Filling: RDX
- Filling weight: 300 g
- Detonation mechanism: Pressure pad

The DM-39 is a German anti-personnel, cylindrical-shaped and plastic-made blast mine intended for emplacement under an anti-tank mine. It is pressure initiated and has a clockwork delayed arming mechanism, making it suitable for its anti-lift role. A secondary fuze well is located on the lower side of the mine, allowing for use of a secondary anti-disturbance fuze. The mine measures 100 by 40 mm with a 300-gram TNT/RDX explosive charge, with three variants of the same dimensions, the DM-39A1, the DM-68 and the DM-68A1.

The DM-39A1 is the metal-case version of the DM-68, a plastic-case training mine with a smoke charge device instead of an explosive one.
