= Assembleia Legislativa =

Assembleia Legislativa may refer to:

Brazil

- Legislative Assembly of Amazonas (Assembleia Legislativa do Estado do Amazonas)
- Legislative Assembly of São Paulo (Assembleia Legislativa do Estado de São Paulo)

China

- Legislative Assembly of Macau (Assembleia Legislativa de Macau)

Portugal

- Legislative Assembly of the Azores (Assembleia Legislativa dos Açores)
- Legislative Assembly of Madeira (Assembleia Legislativa da Madeira)
