= Pennsylvania Railroad class A1 =

PRR A1
Type and origin
- Power type: Steam
- Builder: Juniata Shops
- Build date: 1886–1892
- Total produced: 8
Specifications
- Configuration
  - Whyte: 0-4-0ST
- Gauge: 1,435 mm (4 ft 8 1/2 in)
- Driver dia.: 44 in (1,100 mm)
- Fuel type: Coal
- Cylinders: Two
Career
- First run: 1886
- Last run: 1957
- Retired: 1957
- Withdrawn: 1957
- Disposition: All scrapped

The Pennsylvania Railroad (PRR) class A1 was a class of 0-4-0 type steam locomotives.

== History ==
The class A1 was built from 1886 to 1892, when 0-4-0s were being used by other railroads. In time, larger 0-6-0 locomotives were introduced and superseded them on other railroads. However, the Pennsylvania Railroad had many tightly-curving track ways, as well as lines running through suburban areas. The PRR thus elected to use the small locomotives to operate these tight and confined tracks.

By the 1920s, class A1 was greatly replaced by the even larger class A5s, the largest 0-4-0s on the PRR at the time. By the 1950s, as the diesel switchers became available for easier and more efficient switching duties, the PRR started to replace the 0-4-0s and 0-6-0s (such as the class B6sb switchers) with diesel switchers. The last of the A1s were withdrawn in 1957, and all were ultimately scrapped.
