= Froggy (ISP) =

Froggy was an Australian business, that primarily operated an ISP amongst other things, established and owned by entrepreneur Karl Suleman. At the time of its collapse the company had around 30,000 customers.

Froggy was originally two separate ISPs, A1 Superlink and another smaller one based in Melbourne. In early 2000, Suleman purchased these companies and created the brand name Froggy. Froggy became notable for its use of skywriting in the Australian capital cities. In addition, former Wheel of Fortune hostess Adriana Xenides endorsed the business.

Froggy, mainly as a result of transferring debts from Karl Suleman Enterprises to Froggy, was in financial trouble from the start. In November 2001 the Australian Securities & Investments Commission raided Suleman's home, due to questionable accounting practices and allegations of fraud, mainly involving the misappropriation of funds invested by the Assyrian community in Australia, of which Suleman was a prominent member.

Suleman was sentenced to 5½ years' jail on 26 fraud charges in 2007.
