= Academic grading in Pakistan =

Academic grading in Pakistan is based on a percentage system.

== Lower secondary education ==
Lower secondary education contains the Grade 6 to Grade 10 classes.

Grading Formula 45 Grading of Division

WES – World Education Services

== Upper secondary education ==
Upper secondary education includes the grades 11 and 12th classes. The exam are held by Boards of Intermediate and Secondary Education (BISE).

Percentile	WES Equivalency
80–100	A+
70–79	A
60–69	B
50–59	C
40–49	D
33–39	E
0–32	F

== Higher education ==
Higher education includes Bachelor degrees, Master degrees and Doctoral degrees.
