= Spokane, Portland and Seattle class A1 =

SP&S class A-1
Type and origin
- Power type: Steam
- Builder: Manchester Locomotive Works
- Build date: July 1907
Specifications
- Configuration
  - Whyte: 0-6-0
- Gauge: 4 ft 8 1/2 in (1,435 mm)
- Driver dia.: 51 in (1.30 m)
- Loco weight: 150,000 lbs (68 metric tonnes)
- Fuel type: Oil
- Boiler pressure: 180 lbf/in² (1,723 kPa)
- Cylinders: 2
- Cylinder size: 20x26 inches
Performance figures
- Tractive effort: 31,200 lbf
Career
- Operators: Spokane, Portland and Seattle Railway
- Class: A-1
- Locale: United States
- Retired: 1946 - 1952

The SP&S Class A-1 steam locomotives were a group of five identical locomotives. They were used in the rail yards at Portland, Oregon, and Vancouver, Washington, from 1907 to 1952. They were replaced with diesel-electric switch locomotives.

== Background ==
In 1907, the new SP&S needed equipment for regular operations. Company officials wanted 25 freight locomotives and two switch locomotives to start with. The president of the Great Northern Railway advised SP&S officials that his railroad could contribute excess engines. Because of this, only five switch locomotives were purchased for use in the terminal yards in Portland and Vancouver.

== Construction history ==
All five locomotives in Class A-1 were built by the Manchester plant of American Locomotive Company. Because of the availability of spare parts from the Northern Pacific Railway in Portland, OR, and Pasco and Vancouver, WA, these locomotives were identical to Northern Pacific class L-9 switch locomotives.

== Operational history ==
All five locomotives were delivered to the SP&S in February 1908. They were initially used in work service completing the North Bank line from Portland to Spokane. Upon completion of the main line, these locomotives were transferred to the terminals for switching service. In late 1942 and early 1943 all 5 locomotives were assigned to the Portland Terminal yards as switch locomotives. In 1946 locomotive number 2 was sold to the City of Prineville Railway. With the arrival of SW9 switch engines 43-45 in 1951, the remaining A-1 class steamers were retired in 1952.

== Numbering ==
These locomotives were numbered 1 to 5

== Disposition ==
Locomotive number 1 was scrapped April 25, 1952. Locomotive number 2 was sold to the City of Prineville Railway and renumbered as their number 7 on July 31, 1946. Locomotive number 3 was scrapped January 24, 1952. Locomotive number 4 was scrapped April 25, 1951. Locomotive number 5 was scrapped January 24, 1952.
