= CIA transnational activities in counterproliferation =

This article deals with activities of the U.S. Central Intelligence Agency, specifically dealing with arms control, weapons of mass destruction (WMD) and weapons proliferation. It attempts to look at the process of tasking and analyzing, rather than the problem itself, other than whether the CIA's efforts match its legal mandate or assists in treaty compliance. In some cases, the details of a country's programs are introduced because they present a problem in analysis. For example, if Country X's policymakers truly believe in certain history that may not actually be factual, an analyst trying to understand Country X's policymakers needs to be able to understand their approach to an issue.

CIA organizations have had involvement in strategic weapons intelligence since the U-2 program in the late 1950s, and that the relationships and names of organizations frequently change. Some of the assignments and reports have been, or may still be, classified. Note, for example, that the full Rumsfeld Committee or Iraq Intelligence Commission reports are available only in executive summaries or in heavily redacted documents.

Counterproliferation covers a variety of disciplines, some in the current CIA, some previously in the CIA and now in the DNI, and others in other Federal organizations with mission statements or enabling legislation that give them responsibilities. In US military doctrine, counterproliferation is defined as "Those actions (e.g., detect and monitor, prepare to conduct counterproliferation operations, offensive operations, weapons of mass destruction, active defense, and passive defense) taken to defeat the threat and/or use of weapons of mass destruction against the United States, our military forces, friends, and allies."

The National Counterproliferation Center, now in the DNI but formerly a part of CIA, and having CIA personnel detailed to it, "will coordinate strategic planning within the Intelligence Community (IC) to enhance intelligence support to United States efforts to stem the proliferation of weapons of mass destruction and related delivery systems. It will work with the IC to identify critical intelligence gaps or shortfalls in collection, exploitation, or analysis, and develop solutions to ameliorate or close these gaps. It will also work with the IC to identify long-term proliferation threats and requirements and develop strategies to ensure the IC is positioned to address these threats and issues. NCPC will reach out to elements both inside the Intelligence Community and outside the IC and the U.S. Government to identify new methods or technologies that can enhance the capabilities of the IC to detect and defeat future proliferation threats.". Its authorization comes from several sources:

- The Intelligence Reform and Terrorism Prevention Act of 2004 (IRTPA) of 2004 provided for the establishment of the NCPC to enhance coordination, planning and information sharing amongst the IC on proliferation issues.
- The Iraq Intelligence Commission, also known as the Commission on the Intelligence Capabilities of the United States Regarding Weapons of Mass Destruction's Report of March 31, 2005 also recommended the establishment of an NCPC. The President accepted the Commission's recommendation on June 30, 2005.

Particularly for nuclear weapons and long-range missiles, there is a category of national means of technical verification that uses technical sensors that are operated by organizations other than the CIA. Satellites launched and operated by the National Reconnaissance Office and whose output is evaluated by the National Geospatial-Intelligence Agency, which absorbed the former CIA Office of Imagery Analysis and the joint CIA-military National Photointerpretation Center. The CIA, however, has a significant role in HUMINT collection and in analytic disciplines that help recognize the early parts of a weapons development program.

== Organizational responsibility ==
Before the Office of the Director of National Intelligence was created in 2004, the CIA was both the lead agency and part of the Counterproliferation Center. Under the DNI, November 2005 Mission Managers for counterterrorism, counterproliferation, Iran, and North Korea were established. The CIA is a member of the Center, who contributes both HUMINT and analysis, but the Center is now part of the DNI. CIA reports before the formation of the DNI reflect a lead role as opposed to a member role.

On December 21, 2005, the DNI announced the formal establishment of the NCPC. Consistent with the Senate Report of Pre-war Intelligence on Iraq Recommendation, the NCPC is small (with less than 75 officers) and, rather than conduct analysis, is meant to provide strategic direction for the entire counterproliferation (CP) community. In part, the NCPC is intended to direct the correction seen in the WMD Commission's Iraq case study, which, among others, demonstrated the need for increased interagency HUMINT coordination, better and more uniform tradecraft standards, and increased joint training for operators.

=== International representation ===
The Office of Counterproliferation Initiatives works with the (DNI) National Counterproliferation Center, the CIA's Suppliers and Interdiction Group, and other intelligence organizations. Its purpose is to coordinate and guide, and also to be the formal representative of the United States (as opposed to that role going to the CIA) in arms control issues.

The US is a signatory to a number of multilateral arms control agreements, such as the Nuclear Nonproliferation Treaty (NPT), the Chemical Weapons Convention (CWC), Biological Weapons Convention (BWC), Missile Technology Control Regime (MCTR), the International Code of Conduct against Ballistic Missile Proliferation (ICOC), and the United Nations Convention on Certain Conventional Weapons (CCW). The WINACC provides CIA expertise in support of compliance with these missions, as well as with a number of bilateral treaties with the Russia or the former Soviet Union. These began with the Strategic Arms Limitation Talks (SALT), go through the various Strategic Arms Reduction Treaties (START I and START II), the Treaty on Conventional Armed Forces in Europe (CFE and follow-ons) and the Intermediate-Range Nuclear Forces Treaty (INF). These means include SIGINT (especially TELINT and FISINT), IMINT, and MASINT, where CIA scientific groups have had, or continue to have, responsibilities. Certain of these assignments were classified when first made, and the current responsibilities come from both public statements and declassified documents on earlier assignments.

== Other interagency roles ==
The United States Department of State's Office of Counterproliferation Initiatives (ISN/CPI) is responsible for the treaty-level implementation of arms control, but specifically works with military and CIA agencies. It with the (DNI) National Counterproliferation Center, the CIA's Suppliers and Interdiction Group, and other intelligence organizations as appropriate. Note that the precise nomenclature of the various groups will change over time, but there has been a continuing CIA analytic and technical collection role in these areas.

The office receives support from, coordinates efforts of, and provides guidance to, other offices (including the missile, chemical and biological interdiction groups) for these meetings. It leads policy development to attack the trade in nuclear materials (nuclear smuggling), and coordinate closely with CTR as the lead ISN office for securing facilities and materials worldwide.

To this end, ISN/CPI will receive support from, coordinate efforts of, and provide guidance to, other offices as necessary (including the missile, chemical and biological interdiction groups) for these meetings. It will lead policy development to attack the trade in nuclear materials (nuclear smuggling), and coordinate closely with CTR as the lead ISN office for securing facilities and materials worldwide. It also will work closely with White House offices and other agencies, including the Departments of Defense, Treasury, Commerce, Homeland Security, and Justice, and with the Intelligence Community, to develop and implement appropriate diplomatic, defense, law enforcement, and rapid response options, and other international measures designed to combat the proliferation of weapons of mass destruction.

Again remembering that the arms control mission involves a large amount of interagency coordination, the Defense Threat Reduction Agency has, as its mission, "Our mission is to safeguard America and its allies from Weapons of Mass Destruction (chemical, biological, radiological, nuclear, and high-yield explosives) by providing capabilities to reduce, eliminate, and counter the threat, and mitigate its effects. " Note this includes conventional explosives as well as the chemical, biological, radiological and nuclear weapons commonly associated with WMD." The CIA unit assigned to work most closely with DTRA is the Weapons, Intelligence, Nonproliferation, and Arms Control Center (WINACC), which provides [counterproliferation] intelligence support to deal with national and non-national threats, as well as supporting threat reduction/arms control.

CIA units in the Directorate of Intelligence and the Directorate for Science & Technology work in the verification for all of these functions, starting in 1962, when the Central Intelligence Agency, Deputy Directorate for Research (now the Deputy Directorate for Science and Technology), formally took on ELINT and COMINT responsibilities. "The consolidation of the ELINT program was one of the major goals of the reorganization ... it is responsible for:

- Research, development, testing, and production of ELINT and COMINT collection equipment for all Agency operations.
- Technical operation and maintenance of CIA deployed non-agent ELINT systems.
- Training and maintenance of agent ELINT equipment
- Technical support to the Third Party Agreements.
- Data reduction of Agency-collected ELINT signals.
- ELINT support peculiar to the penetration problems associated with the Agent's reconnaissance program under NRO.
- Maintain a quick reaction capability for ELINT and COMINT equipment."

"CIA's Office of Research and Development was formed to stimulate research and innovation testing leading to the exploitation of non-agent intelligence collection methods ... All non-agent technical collection systems will be considered by this office and those appropriate for field deployment will be so deployed. The Agency's missile detection system, Project [deleted] based on backscatter radar is an example. This office will also provide integrated systems analysis of all possible collection methods against the Soviet antiballistic missile program is an example." It is not clear where ELINT would end and MASINT would begin for some of these projects, but the role of both is potentially present. MASINT, in any event, was not formalized as a US-defined intelligence discipline until 1986.

CIA took on a more distinct MASINT responsibility in 1987. The National Security Archive commented, "In 1987, Deputy Director for Science and Technology Evan Hineman established ... a new Office for Special Projects. concerned not with satellites, but with emplaced sensors—sensors that could be placed in a fixed location to collect signals intelligence or measurement and signature intelligence (MASINT) about a specific target. Such sensors had been used to monitor Chinese missile tests, Soviet laser activity, military movements, and foreign nuclear programs. The office was established to bring together scientists from the DS&T's Office of SIGINT Operations, who designed such systems, with operators from the Directorate of Operations, who were responsible for transporting the devices to their clandestine locations and installing them.

=== Issues in improving counterproliferation intelligence ===
Ashton B. Carter, co-director of the Preventive Defense Project, Harvard & Stanford Universities commented, "since 9/11 we have overhauled counterterrorism, and intelligence has focused in response, but we have not overhauled counterproliferation. We have a war on terrorism, but we are not yet at war on WMD." In his testimony to the Iraq Intelligence Commission, Carter that an intelligence agency attempting to work in counterproliferation needs to understand and learn from past failures in detecting programs that do not assist in preserving the peace. Carter cited three major issues:

1. Framing the work of this Commission in the context of our overall effort to counter WMD ( ... mostly nuclear and biological weapons, the others being less threatening).
2. Recommendations for improving WMD intelligence. These recommendations are drawn in part from discussions the Preventive Defense Project has hosted with senior intelligence community leaders and other knowledgeable people over the past year on a not-for-attribution basis.
3. the relationship between the specific problem of WMD intelligence and the overall issue of intelligence community reform.

Further, he recommended overhauling of counterproliferation intelligence into a set of missions that need intelligence support, and the roster of customers that demand that intelligence. There is a constant conflict between the perceptions of policymakers and analysts, in all areas analysis, applies here. Carter recommends organizing counterproliferation according to the "8 D's" first introduced in DOD as part of the Counterproliferation Initiative:

1. dissuasion
2. diplomacy
3. disarmament
4. denial
5. defusing
6. deterrence
7. defense
8. destruction.

The ideas counterproliferation intelligence, across all the 8 D's is a key frame for the work of this Commission. There is no such thing as an "intelligence failure"; all intelligence failures are coupled to policy failures}. Conversely, the Commission's efforts to improve WMD intelligence cannot be fully realized unless and until the U.S. government creates a clear and comprehensive counterproliferation policy and program. Intelligence cannot supply the policy customer unless the customer articulates its demand; see tasking and directing the intelligence cycle. The principles expressed here are realized in the interagency NCPC, its CIA component (the WINACC), the DTRA, and the ISN/CPI.

=== WMD transfer ===
A second frame for the Commission's work involves the risk calculus associated with WMD. This is referred to in a Foreign Affairs article as the "Rumsfeld Challenge". United States Secretary of Defense Donald Rumsfeld became convinced in the course of his work on ballistic missile proliferation before he took office that adequate intelligence on WMD programs is simply unlikely to be present in many cases Given the stakes, he concluded, the U.S. must assume the worst in formulating its policy responses. This logic, stated originally as "Rather than measuring how far a program had progressed from a known starting point, the Commission sought to measure how close a program might be to demonstrating the first flight of a long range ballistic missile. This approach requires that analysts extrapolate a program's scope, scale, pace and direction beyond what the hard evidence at hand unequivocally supports." and encapsulated by Belfer in the maxim "absence of evidence [of WMD] is not evidence of absence", was the main intellectual argument in the Rumsfeld Commission report leading to the deployment of a National Missile Defense. The maxim was phrased in yet another way by Senator Jon Kyl: "So instead of being surprised at surprises, the Rumsfeld Commission report says we need to get into a new mode of thinking to understand that we should not be surprised by surprises, and that we should base our policy on that understanding."

According to this maxim, intelligence regarding the timetable for the development of an intercontinental ballistic missile (ICBM) threat originating in Iran or North Korea was uncertain enough that it was deemed imprudent for the United States merely to be prepared to deploy a missile defense within a few years (the Clinton administration policy), but instead necessary to undertake deployment immediately.

=== Conventional arms distribution ===
Al Qaeda already had long-standing ties to the gemstone trade. Documents and testimony presented during 2000 the trials of Wadih el Hage and Mohammed Sadeek Odeh show that al Qaeda, even before the U.S. embassy bombings, was dealing extensively in diamonds, tanzanite, amethyst, rubies and sapphires, mostly as money-making ventures. According to the trial transcripts, senior al Qaeda leaders were deeply concerned about the possibility that an al Qaeda operative was carrying a large quantity of stones when he drowned while crossing a lake.

... Victor Bout, one of the world's largest illicit weapons dealers, registered his fleet of aircraft in Liberia because he could do so with no questions asked and no inspections required. With those aircraft, he shipped tons of weapons-including combat helicopters, surface-to-air missiles and anti-aircraft guns—to Taylor and the RUF through Burkina Faso. At the same time, Bout was supplying UNITA rebels in Angola and several sides of the civil war that was shattering the Democratic Republic of Congo. He often accepted diamonds as payment for his weapons.

There is an intriguing link between Bout and al Qaeda. U.S. and U.N. investigators found that, while supplying African wars with weapons, Bout was also providing goods and services to the Taliban and al Qaeda. From his base in the United Arab Emirates, Bout and a partner, a member of the royal family, flew weapons, medicines and other commodities to the outlaw regime and its supporters.

=== Proliferation of conventional weapons ===
The Convention on Certain Conventional Weapons covers:

1. Non-detectable Fragments – Protocol I prohibits the use of "any weapons the primary effect of which is to injure by fragments which in the human body escape detection by X-rays."
2. Landmines and Booby-traps – Protocol II (Amended) regulates the use of landmines, booby-traps and other devices. In 1996, an amended Protocol II was adopted to significantly strengthen the restrictions on mines, booby-traps and other devices
3. Incendiary Weapons – Protocol III regulates the use of "any weapon or munition which is primarily designed to set fire to objects or to cause burn injury to persons ..."
4. Blinding Lasers – Protocol IV prohibits use of "laser weapons specifically designed, as their sole combat function or as one of their combat functions, to cause permanent blindness to unenhanced vision ..."
5. Explosive Remnants of War – Protocol V addresses the threat posed by explosive remnants of war to civilians and civilian economies after conflicts end.

The United States has ratified only articles 1 and 2.

Under Section 721 of the FY 97 Intelligence Authorization Act, the CIA is required,

(a) Not later than 6 months after the date of the enactment of this Act, and every 6 months thereafter, the Director of Central Intelligence shall submit to Congress a report on

(1) the acquisition by foreign countries during the preceding 6 months of dual-use and other technology useful for the development or production of weapons of mass destruction (including nuclear weapons, chemical weapons, and biological weapons) and advanced conventional munitions; and
(2) trends in the acquisition of such technology by such countries." It is required to be unclassified, so "As such, the report does not present the details of the Intelligence Community's assessments of weapons of mass destruction and advanced conventional munitions programs that are available in other classified reports and briefings for the Congress." It is reasonable to assume that "advanced conventional munitions" include precision guided munitions mentioned below, as a potential alternative for certain nuclear weapons. It is unclear, however, if the weapons types identified in the CCW are covered by the supplemental reports provided to Congress; the statutory report cited does not cite any.

The role of precision guided munitions, which, while they are an alternative to some nuclear weapons, especially tactical nuclear weapons, are not yet part of treaties but may fall under the Congressional reporting requirements.

== Long-range delivery systems ==
While long-range delivery systems can be useful with precision guidance and conventional warheads, or even specialized payloads to damage electrical systems, missile systems are a practical necessity to deliver WMD in any conventional combat situation. Intelligence for compliance with the Missile Technology Control Regime (MTCR) and the International Code of Conduct against Ballistic Missile Proliferation (ICOC) is significant in counterproliferation here.

=== Cruise missiles ===
Baghdad was continuing to develop UAVs which probably were intended as delivery platforms for biological weapons (BW). The UAVs posed a threat to Iraq's neighbors and US. forces in the Persian Gulf (2000, 2002).

According to the 2001 forecast, several countries could develop a mechanism to launch SRBMs, MRBMs, or land-attack cruise missiles from forward-based ships or other platforms; a few are likely to do so—more likely for cruise missiles—before 2015.

There was also a need to assess the Iraqi delivery systems. In addition to the October 2002 National Intelligence Estimate (NIE) on "Iraq's Continuing Programs for Weapons of Mass Destruction", the Intelligence Community (IC) produced several intelligence assessments which addressed Iraq's weapons of mass destruction (WMD) programs and, more specifically, Iraq's delivery systems, including missiles and unmanned aerial vehicles (UAVs). In December 2000, the National Intelligence Council (NIC) produced an Intelligence Community Assessment (ICA), "Iraq: Steadily Pursuing WMD Capabilities". The assessment was prepared at the request of the National Security Council (NSC) for a broad update on Iraqi efforts to rebuild WMD and delivery programs in the absence of weapons inspectors, as well as a review of what remained of the WMD arsenal and outstanding disarmament issues that were the focus of the United Nations Special Commission (UNSCOM). In July 1998, the NIC produced an ICA, The Foreign Biological and Chemical Weapons Threat to the United States, which discussed Iraq's development of unmanned aerial vehicles (UAV) for possible biological weapons (BW) delivery.

=== Nonmissile WMD threats to the United States ===
Nonmissile means of delivering weapons of mass destruction do not provide the same prestige or degree of deterrence and coercive diplomacy associated with ICBMs. Nevertheless, concern remains about options for delivering WMD to the United States without missiles by state and nonstate actors. Ships, trucks, airplanes, and other means may be used. In fact, the Intelligence Community judges that US territory is more likely to be attacked with WMD using nonmissile means, primarily because such means:

- Are less expensive than developing and producing ICBMs.
- Can be covertly developed and employed; the source of the weapon could be masked in an attempt to evade retaliation.
- Probably would be more reliable than ICBMs that have not completed rigorous testing and validation programs.
- Probably would be much more accurate than emerging ICBMs over the next 15 years.
  - Probably would be more effective for disseminating biological warfare agent than a ballistic missile.
- Would avoid missile defenses.

Foreign nonstate actors—including terrorist, insurgent, or extremist groups—have used, possessed, or expressed an interest in CBRN materials. Most of these groups have threatened the United States, and all of them have the ability to attack the United States or its interests. The events of September 11 and its aftermath have caused the Intelligence Community to focus significantly more resources on the threat from terrorism, and we are obtaining more information on potential terrorist actions.

=== Unmanned aerial vehicles ===
Unmanned aerial vehicles have similar flight characteristics to cruise missiles, but are under active human guidance and thus are more flexible. They would be especially attractive for biological weapons delivery.

The IC assessed since at least 2000 that Baghdad was developing UAVs which were probably intended to deliver biological warfare agents, and that the UAVs posed a threat to Iraq's neighbors and U.S. forces in the Persian Gulf. In the 2002 NIE, the IC assessed that Iraq was developing a UAV, "probably intended to deliver biological warfare agents", which could threaten the US. homeland if brought close to or into the U.S. The statement that the UAV was probably intended to deliver biological agents was made in the key judgments, and not in the main body of the delivery section of the NIE. The USAF disagreed with this assessment and added a footnote to the NIE which noted that it "does not agree that Iraq is developing UAVs primarily intended to be delivery platforms for chemical and biological warfare (CBW) agents. The small size of Iraq's new UAV strongly suggests a primary role of reconnaissance, although CBW delivery is an inherent capability." Of note, the text of the biological warfare section of the NIE was similar to the USAF footnote in stating that "although we have no information linking the current UAV development with BW delivery, this new airframe may represent another future method of BW delivery."

The NIE assessment that Iraq was developing UAVs probably intended for BW delivery was based in part on information from UN inspections and Iraqi declarations.

- showed that in 1995 Iraq declared that it had a pre-Gulf War project to convert MIG-21 aircraft to pilotless aircraft with a drop tank that would deliver biological agent. Iraq conducted one experiment with this aircraft in 1991, but Iraq said it dropped the project because of the war.
- prior to the Gulf War, Iraq had been working on a program to modify drop tanks for use on an F-1 Mirage fighter for chemical and biological weapons (CBW) dispersal, and had tested the aircraft using an anthrax simulant.

Although this was a manned aircraft, IC analysts assessed that the drop tank work could have had applications for use with UAVs. It was also noted that Iraq had modified commercial crop sprayers for BW delivery at the Salman Pak facility that were assessed to be suitable for the dissemination of BW agents from helicopters or slow-moving fixed-wing aircraft.

IC analysts told Committee staff that when Iraq began to convert 1960s Czech-built L-29 jet trainers into UAVs in 1995, they assessed that Iraq may have intended to use the L-29s for CBW delivery instead of the MIG-21s they had worked on prior to the Gulf War. The IC provided the Committee with the five reports to support the assessment that the L-29s were intended for CBW delivery, only one of which said explicitly that the L-29 UAVs were intended to deliver unconventional weapons.

The IC provided the Committee with HUMINT which said that in February 1999, Iraq was working to increase the L-29s' payload and arm them with "special bombs". The report said the L-29s would be flown at low altitudes to targets outside Iraq, but provided no additional information.

The IC also provided the Committee with three CIA HUMINT reports, all from the same source, x8 The three reports all describe an 1;-29 deployment to Tallil, Iraq airbase in November 1997. When the L-29 unit arrived at the base, the commander of the air defense command informed the unit that their mission was to lure US. aircraft into a surface-to-air missile (SAM) trap. The unit's detachment commander later told the team that their "real" mission was to penetrate Kuwait and use the L-29s to "hit and scare" the

=== Ballistic missiles ===
In the scope of this article, it is worth mentioning intelligence analysis, both on futures and past forecasts.

==== China ====
To understand China's strategic positions, analysts must understand the Second Artillery; its doctrine, organization, and hardware; the implications for international security. concerned analysts are compelled to understand and analyze the Second Artillery more precisely, including its evolving doctrine, organization, and hardware, and their implications for international security.

Work over ten years old, trues to weave several of these strands together in the context of a "cultural" explanation. Taking such an approach, [the National Intelligence Council consultants] reached four key findings" on the perspectives of Chinese ... [missile arms] posture:

1. From a theoretical perspective, traditional approaches such as neo-Realist and organization theory do not adequately predict and explain key aspects of Chinese nuclear doctrine,: conventional missile doctrine, :and force structure. Rather, an understanding of such variables as domestic political, technological, historical, and cultural factors provide far greater insight and predictive capacity about the drivers that shape China's doctrinal and force structure decisions.
2. From a technical perspective, although we agree with analysts who highlight the role of technology in shaping Chinese doctrine, we go beyond the somewhat simplistic understanding that technology drives doctrine. Rather, we see patterns of rational strategic choice made for China's nuclear posture, though technology limited the realm of the possible for Chinese leaders. Perhaps it could be said that the Chinese made a virtue out of necessity in the construction of their nuclear deterrent, accepting the technological constraints of the system and making rational choices under those constraints.
3. Examining "evolution" is telling the story of "trying to close the gap between real capability, on the one hand, and what one might call aspirational doctrine; on the other. In the United States, the appropriate analog would be a comparison of current operational doctrine, as outlined in the Joint Doctrine publications series, with an aspirational doctrine, such as Joint Vision 2010. In the Chinese case, the discontinuity between reality and aspiration is of times referred to as the capabilities-doctrine gap. At the present stage in the Second Artillery's modernization, China is nearing an historic convergence between doctrine and capability, allowing it to increasingly achieve a degree of credible minimal deterrence vis-à-vis the continental United States—a convergence of its doctrine and capability it has not confidently possessed since the weaponization of China's nuclear program in the mid-1960s.
4. For the future, "the doctrine and force structure of China's Second Artillery should be analyzed at three distinct levels, reflecting a multifaceted force with very different missions: a posture of credible minimal deterrence with regard to the continental United States and Russia; a more offensive-oriented posture of "limited deterrence" with regard to China's theater nuclear forces; and an offensively configured, preemptive, counterforce warfighting posture of active defense or offensive defense for the Second Artillery's conventional missile forces."

==== India ====
The IC estimated that New Delhi believes that a nuclear-capable missile delivery option is necessary to deter Pakistani first use of nuclear weapons and thereby preserve the option to wage limited conventional war in response to Pakistani provocations in Kashmir or elsewhere. Nuclear weapons also serve as a hedge against a confrontation with China. New Delhi views the development, not just the possession, of nuclear-capable ballistic missiles as the symbols of a world power and an important component of self-reliance.

==== Iran ====
The IC is tracking the work of Iran in pursuing short- and long-range missile capabilities. Tehran has 1,300-km-range Shahab-3 medium-range ballistic missiles (MRBMs) that could be launched in a conflict.

Iran is pursuing an ICBM/space launch vehicle (SLV) system. All agencies agree that Iran could attempt a launch in mid-decade, but Tehran is likely to take until the last half of the decade to flight test an ICBM/SLV; one agency further believes that Iran is unlikely to conduct a successful test until after 2015.

==== Iraq ====
Iraq's Scud short-range ballistic missiles and derivatives are essentially World War II technology. "The IC assessed that gaps in Iraqi declarations and Baghdad's failure to fully account for destruction of prohibited missiles strongly suggested that Iraq retained a small force of Scud-type ballistic missiles. The NIE said that the covert force may contain "up to a few dozen" Scud-variant short range ballistic missiles (SRBMs). UNSCOM data and reports provided to the Committee showed that the UN had been unable to account for two of 819 Scud missiles Iraq acquired from the Soviet Union, seven indigenously produced a1 Husayn Scud-type missiles, 50 conventional Scud warheads and over 500 tons of proscribed Scud propellants Iraq claimed to have destroyed unilaterally."

In its 2000, 2001, and 2002 intelligence products (i.e., before the 2003 invasion), the IC updated its assessments and asserted that Iraq had made steady progress in developing its missile programs and was continuing to develop UAVs. The IC assessed that: Iraq was in the final stages of development of the a1 Samoud missile (2000), may be preparing to deploy the a1 Samoud (2001), and was deploying the a1 Samoud and Ababil-100 short-range ballistic missiles (SRBMs), both which exceed the 150-h UN range limit (2002).

==== North Korea ====
The IC estimated that North Korea's multiple-stage Taepodong-2, which is capable of reaching parts of the United States with a nuclear weapon-sized (several hundred kg) payload, may be ready for flight-testing. North Korea in May 2001, however, extended its voluntary moratorium on long-range missile flight-testing until 2003, provided that negotiations with the United States proceed. A Taepo Dong-2 test probably would be conducted in a space launch configuration, like the Taepo Dong-1 test in 1998. The North continues to develop missiles.

==== Pakistan ====
According to the SNIE, Pakistan sees missile-delivered nuclear weapons as a vital deterrent to India's much larger conventional forces, and as a necessary counter to India's nuclear program. Pakistan pursued a nuclear capability more for strategic reasons than for international prestige.

==== Russia ====
Russia's long-range delivery systems are the subject of other articles on their characteristics and arms control agreements affecting them. Briefly, the intelligence community forecasts that "nless Moscow significantly increases funding for its strategic forces, the Russian arsenal will decline to less than 2,000 warheads by 2015—with or without arms control.

Russia currently has about 700 ICBMs with 3,000 warheads and a dozen SSBNs[2] equipped with 200 launchers for SLBMs that can carry 900 warheads. In the current day-to-day operational environment—with all procedural and technical safeguards in place—an unauthorized or accidental launch of a Russian strategic missile is highly unlikely.

Concerns over the US Missile Defense (MD) program have led several high-ranking Russian political, military, and industry officials to openly discuss military countermeasures to the system. The SS-27—developed in the 1980s as a response to the Strategic Defense Initiative—probably is the basis for Russia's most credible responses to missile defense.

"The disintegration of the Soviet Union, developmental problems, and resource constraints have resulted in significant SSBN/SLBM program delays and the requirement to simultaneously extend the service lives of older systems while maintaining newer, more capable systems." Having a workable SLBM does little good if the submarines or crews are not ready.

"The Intelligence Community has various projections of Russia's strategic forces for 2015, all less than 2,000 deployed nuclear weapons. The availability of resources, inclusion of missiles with multiple independently targetable reentry vehicles (MIRVs), and the success of development programs are the key factors in determining the ultimate force size.

== Biological ==
Biological and nuclear weapons fall into the highest level of WMD threat, because their effect, for a given low weight, is far greater than for chemical and radiological weapons. As a consequence, they were given a priority, comparable to that given nuclear weapons, in the analysis of Iraq's potential WMD programs. Also, see CIA transnational health and economic activities regarding naturally occurring disease and public health issues in selected countries including Russia and India.

Although the FBI, CIA and ODNI all have bioweapons-related programs and activities, very little information can be found regarding such activities and their funding.

One of the challenges of the Biological Weapons Convention (BWC) is, in order to test permissible defenses, can a signatory develop hypothetical offensive weapons. The Biological Weapons Convention (BWC) of 1972 is a disarmament treaty, not an arms control treaty. When it was negotiated, the Geneva Protocol of 1925, which prohibits the use of biological weapons (BW), was already in force and considered a part of international law. But the negotiators of the BWC wanted to "exclude completely the possibility" of biological agents and toxins being used as weapons by abolishing the weapons themselves.

"In the past, the United States has understood the need for transparency and limits in its biodefence programme. A Programmatic Environmental Impact Statement (PEIS) covering biological research, development, testing and evaluation conducted by the Department of Defense (DoD), finalised in 1989, stated that the programme "does not include the development of any weapons, even defensive ones, nor does it attempt to develop new pathogenic organisms for any use. All work conducted under the BDRP is unclassified. However, results may be classified if they impinge on national security by specifying US military deficiencies, vulnerabilities or significant breakthroughs in technology ... Sometime during the 1990s, the situation in the United States changed from a policy of relative openness to secrecy, precipitated perhaps by the Gulf War and the findings of the United Nations Special Commission (UNSCOM) in Iraq, the disclosures of Soviet defectors, and the attempted biological attacks by Aum Shinrikyo in Japan.

Donald Mahley, who had been Chief Negotiator on BW for the US, told the House Subcommittee on National Security, Veterans Affairs and International Relations that a number of US government agencies conduct biological activities that raise "ambiguities" regarding their purpose; therefore, to protect their interests, the agencies refused to accept many of the monitoring measures proposed for the Protocol. "The kinds of agency activities that prompted Mahley's testimony and the hardline US opposition to a Protocol were illuminated by a New York Times article on September 4, 2001, exposing three secret biodefence projects that push up against the permissible limits of the BWC. Government officials knew about the article as early as May, but it was not published until after the United States had rejected the Protocol. US allies have privately said that their consternation would have been overt, had their anger not been overshadowed by sympathy on September 11.

"The secret projects detailed in the Times report were: construction from off-the-shelf materials of a plant for production of microbial anthrax simulants, known as Project Bacchus and conducted by the Defense Threat Reduction Agency (DTRA); a Defense Intelligence Agency (DIA) plan to genetically engineer a vaccine-resistant strain of anthrax developed by the Russians; and a Central Intelligence Agency (CIA) project, called Clear Vision, to construct and test a Soviet-model biological bomblet.

"There is no record of concerns about the legality of the DOE aerosol project or the Edgewood bomblets, but questions about the CIA's Clear Vision bomblet programme arose from different sources on three occasions between mid-1999 and early 2001, the duration of the project. The questions were never fully resolved, but the work went ahead after CIA lawyers held that the project was legal under the BWC. CIA officials appeared to be covering all eventualities, however, by saying that the bomblets lacked explosive fuses and therefore were not functional arms.

"None of these questionable US activities has been declared in the US annual CBM reports. It appears to have been conveniently assumed that only activities conducted under the official DoD biodefence programme need be declared, although other DOD units—DIA, DTRA—and other agencies—CIA, DOE—have increasingly taken on biodefence functions.

=== Iran ===
Iran has biological and chemical weapons programs.

=== Russia ===
The IC has documented that the fUSSR, and possibly Russia, have done extensive BW work. One of the most dramatic events was an accidental anthrax attack on the Sverdlovsk area. DIA did more of the reporting than CIA, probably due to its having oversight over DoD biological programs.

The first CIA report cites HUMINT about a possible accidental release, but not committing to unlawful storage of BW materials. A subsequent CIA report does assume it was an accident in a BW facility.

Soviet BW analysis was not limited to the Sverdlovsk incident, but also studied possible Soviet use during the Vietnam War and in Afghanistan.

== Nuclear/fissionable ==
The work of the Senate Select Committee on Intelligence, again, gives context for judging the effectiveness of the IC, which, at the time, was led by CIA. This section looks first at multinational analysis of nuclear capabilities, with focus on countries other than the first five (US, USSR, UK, France, China). Nuclear use by non-national states was not considered in 1966, but appeared in the 1975 study.

=== 1966 Nuclear potential of nations ===
CIA declassified more information from this 1966 NIE, including a country analysis, including some unusual details on Israel: it had "imported and stockpiled sufficient unsafeguarded uranium for a few weapons." The excised analysis probably indicates how U.S. intelligence assessed Israel's production capabilities from the Dimona reactor as well as the source(s) of imports. The excised analysis probably indicates how U.S. intelligence assessed Israel's production capabilities from the Dimona reactor as well as the source(s) of imports. In any event, the analysts concluded that Israel had not yet produced any weapons but that it would be hard for the international community to check such a decision if Israel believed that "the threat from the Arab states could no longer be contained by conventional means." According to Avner Cohen's major study, by May 1967, Israel had an operational nuclear weapon.

Besides Israel, the analysts saw India as the only other "serious [contender] for nuclear status", with the latter "likely to undertake a nuclear weapons program in the next several years."

In keeping with the 1965 INR contributions, Pakistan was on the list of potential nuclear states; so were the Australia, Canada, Switzerland, Taiwan, Indonesia, and the UAR [now Egypt]. The CIA partly declassified an interesting analysis of the "Snowball Effect" suggesting the larger impact of decisions on a nuclear capability by one or two countries.

- If India develops weapons, Pakistan will feel pressure to do so. The status of Chinese development also affects India.
- If Israel develops weapons, the UAR will feel pressure to do so

One factor was whether a nation had domestic supplies of uranium. Countries with a domestic supply, and an appropriate level of technology, include India, Sweden, Australia and South Africa. Indian and Canadian reactors, at the time of the NIE, were the only ones that could easily produce weapons-grade plutonium. While Japan and West Germany have the technology base, their public opinion would be strongly against development.

=== 1975 nuclear potential of nations ===
Eight years later, the assessments had grown more complex. "The requisite materials and technology are already too widely available for technical safeguards and international regulation to be effective." While the author believed that there was "no hope of preventing nuclear proliferation", the study argued that it might be possible to influence the choices made by would-be nuclear states, e.g., to not go too far down the road to weaponization. Nuclear terrorism had come under discussion by the mid-1970s: "the same increasing availability of nuclear materials and technology which has made nuclear explosives accessible to developing states can also be expected sooner or later to bring them within the reach of terrorist groups."

This paper examines two kinds of proliferation: horizontal, or the spread of weapons to new actors, and vertical, or the development of additional capabilities (e.g., thermonuclear, miniaturized) for existing actors. There are two fundamental assumptions:

1. Proliferation is first and foremost a political issue, spawned by the confrontation between developed and less-developed actors
2. While proliferation is never good, some kinds of proliferation are worse than others.

It is the analyst's opinions that competition among suppliers of special nuclear material is sufficiently widespread that diverting national programs will still not deprive a national actor of bomb-grade material. The price of a usable nuclear weapon, when delivery systems, as well as economics, security, and technological investment are considered, is far greater than a nuclear demonstration alone. States divide into several groups, perhaps further divided by their having, or not having, domestic nuclear material production:

1. Nuclear superpowers, which at the time of the report, were the five declared states,
2. Nuclear explosive states (e.g., India)
3. Nuclear abstainers, having the technology but choosing not to develop it (e.g., Canada, Japan, Sweden)
4. Nuclear threshold states, which could develop basic capability in a reasonable time (e.g., Taiwan, Iran, Brazil)
5. States that maintain deliberate ambiguity about status (e.g., Israel)

The IC questions the value of the Nuclear Non-Proliferation Treaty (NPT) as a means of preventing proliferation. Only major power arms reduction will encourage marginal states to sign. Long-range missile development may actually be a harder problem for a would-be proliferator to solve, than the construction of a basic nuclear weapon demonstration, so missile technology transfer may be as important as nuclear technology. Yet another variable is that precision guided munitions are, for some military applications, reasonable alternatives, with easier manufacturing and much less political downside, than nuclear weapons.

=== 2002 intelligence on Iraq ===
Prior to the October 2002 National Intelligence Estimate (NIE) on Iraq's Continuing Programs for Weapons of Mass Destruction, the Intelligence Community (IC) prepared several Community papers on Iraq's weapons of mass destruction (WMD) programs, and, more specifically, Iraq's nuclear weapons program. In October 1998, the IC published a National Intelligence Council PIC) Memorandum, Current Iraqi WMD Capabilities. In December 2000, the IC published an Intelligence Community Assessment (ICA), Iraq: Steadily Pursuing WMD Capabilities (ICA 2000-007HCX). The assessment was prepared at the request of the National Security Council (NSC) for a broad update on Iraqi efforts to rebuild WMD and delivery system programs in the absence of weapons inspectors, as well as a review of what remains of the WMD arsenal and outstanding disarmament issues that were the focus of the United Nations Special Commission (UNSCOM).

On Iraq's nuclear program, the IC also produced a Joint Atomic Energy Intelligence Committee (JAEIC) report in October 1997, Reconstitution of Iraq's Nuclear Weapons Program: An Update (JAEIC 97-004) and a JAEIC report in June 1999, Reconstitution of Iraq s Nuclear Weapons Program: Post Desert Fox (JAEIC 99-003).

All of the assessments in these Community papers on Iraq's nuclear program were consistent in assessing that: The International Atomic Energy Agency (IAEA) and UNSCOM had destroyed portions of, and neutralized the remainder of Iraq's nuclear infrastructure but that Iraq retained the foundation for future nuclear reconstitution. Iraq continued low-level clandestine theoretical research and training of personnel, and was attempting to procure dual-use technologies and materials that could be used to reconstitute its nuclear program. If Iraq acquired a significant quantity of fissile material through foreign assistance, it could have a crude nuclear weapon within a year.

=== Annual Russian nuclear facilities safety review ===
Congress has directed the Director of Central Intelligence (DCI) to submit to the Congressional leadership and intelligence committees an annual, unclassified report assessing the safety and security of the nuclear facilities and military forces in Russia. Congress has requested that each report include a discussion of the following:

- The ability of the Russian Government to maintain its nuclear military forces.
- The security arrangements at Russia's civilian and military nuclear facilities.
- The reliability of controls and safety systems at Russia's civilian nuclear facilities.
- The reliability of command and control systems and procedures of the nuclear military forces in Russia.

== Chemical ==
As part of the Intelligence Community's report to the Senate Select Committee, it examined Iraq's pursuit of chemical weapons.

=== China ===
"Statements by PLA officers on CW and its historical development are often derivative of Western and Russian-language sources. The same sources charge that the US military used chemical weapons against Sino-Korean forces, including mustard, cyanide, and chloropicrin. The PRC also alleges the extensive use of BZ (an incapacitating agent) by the United States in the Vietnam war.

Two PLA officers who are also CBW experts are skeptical that arms inspections can stop the proliferation of chemical weapons technology in toto. The PRC is under the impression that coalition forces moved some 2,700 tons of weaponized CW agent near the Persian Gulf during the Gulf War (1991). With regard to the Chemical Weapons Convention (CWC), the PRC probably believes that for a country to clandestinely produce large amounts of chemical weapons and not be discovered is impossible.

China was able to indigenously mass-produce CW defense equipment only by the mid-1970s. A nuclear, biological, and chemical (NBC) defense reconnaissance vehicle recently was modified by the PLA using a chassis from the Beijing-Jeep line of SUVs. See Materials MASINT. After 1979, a new series of CW defense materiel was designed, and, by 1987, a total of 50 different standardized models were used by the PLA.

During the 1960s and 1970s, China provided instruction in chemical defense medicine to students from Vietnam, North Korea, and Albania. The official history of military medicine in the PRC indicates China finally deduced the chemical formula and composition of VX only by the 1970s.

China's large oil reserves and petrochemical industry probably were adequate to manufacture blister (Lewisite, sulfur, and nitrogen mustards) in large quantities, perhaps by the mid-1950s. Since the founding of the PRC, production of elemental phosphorus for fine chemicals probably was a very difficult procedure for Chinese chemists to accomplish. If China has in fact given up an offensive CW capability, the PRC does so now when it is most able to produce a wide range of toxic nerve agents, and in large quantities. A pessimistic view is that, in the event of a major crisis, the PRC would have little trouble reconstituting a large chemical weapons arsenal within a relatively short period of time.

=== USSR ===
During the Clinton Administration, concerns were raised about Russian compliance with the Chemical Weapons Convention.

==== Verification questions ====
In 1994, then-CIA Director R. James Woolsey told senators that "the chemical-weapons problem is so difficult from an intelligence perspective that I cannot state that we have high confidence in our ability to detect noncompliance, especially on a small scale." A May 1995 National Intelligence Estimate stated that production of new classes of chemical weapons "would be difficult to detect and confirm as a CWC-sponsored activity."

==== Clandestine production ====
The Pentagon report says the chemical formulas are not defined in the CWC lists [i.e., their "Schedules". Schedule I contains a listing of substances assumed to be for chemical warfare]. Therefore, Novichok weapons technically are not banned under the treaty. The administration counters that they are banned "in spirit", but as with all its arms control agreements, Moscow has been banking on the technicality and the camouflage.

In September 1992, Vil Mirzayanov, a dissident Russian scientist who worked for 26 years on the clandestine programs, wrote an article in Moscow News describing the existence and nature of Novichok, and the specific intent to circumvent the CWC. More details emerged over the next two years as authorities persecuted—but never disputed—Mr. Mirzayanov. One of Russia's top binary weapons scientists, Vladimir Uglev, revealed the existence of A-232—which he personally developed—in an interview with the magazine Novoye Vremya in early 1994. And in May 1994 Mr. Mirzayanov wrote about A-232 and other substances in an article for this page.
