= Durham tube =

Tubes used in microbiology

- Uses: Visual detection of gas produced by a microorganism
- Related items: Test tube

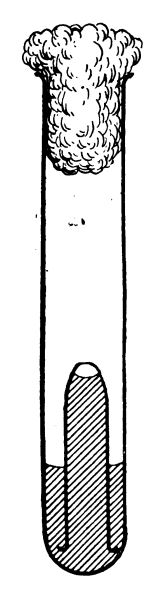
Diagram of a Durham Tube

Durham tubes are used in microbiology to detect production of gas by microorganisms. They are simply smaller test tubes inserted upside down in another test tube so they are freely movable. The culture media to be tested is then added to the larger tube and sterilized, which also eliminates the initial air gap produced when the tube is inserted upside down. The culture media typically contains a single substance to be tested with the organism, such as to determine whether an organism can ferment a particular carbohydrate. After inoculation and incubation, any gas that is produced will form a visible gas bubble inside the small tube. Litmus solution can also be added to the culture media to give a visual representation of pH changes that occur during the production of gas. The method was first reported in 1898 by British microbiologist Herbert Durham.

One limitation of the Durham tube is that it does not allow for precise determination of the type of gas that is produced within the inner tube, or measurements of the quantity of gas produced. However, Durham argued that quantitive measurements are of limited value because of the culture solution will absorb some of the gas in unknown, variable proportions. Additionally, using Durham tubes to provide evidence of fermentation may not be able to detect slow- or weakly-fermenting organisms when the resultant carbon dioxide diffuses back into the solution as quickly as it is formed, so a negative test using Durham tubes does not indicate decisive physiological significance.
