= A1 sport league =

This is a list of sport leagues designated A1. The entries are sorted by sport and by countries.

== Baseball ==
- A1 baseball league (Italy)
- Class A1 (baseball), a defunct classification within Minor League Baseball

== Basketball ==
- A1 basketball league (Albania), the first professional league
- A1 basketball league (Bosnia and Herzegovina)
- A1 basketball league (Bulgaria), the second professional league
- A1 basketball league (Croatia)
- A1 basketball league (Greece)

== Inline hockey ==
- A1 inline hockey league (Italy), a league composed of eleven professional teams

== Volleyball ==
- A1 volleyball league (Greece)
- A1 volleyball league (Italy)
- A1 volleyball league (Portugal)
- A1 women's volleyball league (Portugal)

== Water polo ==
- A1 water polo league (Greece)
