= Aleph One (disambiguation) =

Aleph One ($\aleph_1$) is the second aleph number.

Aleph One may also refer to:

- Aleph One (game engine), an enhanced version of the Marathon 2 game engine
- Elias Levy, computer security professional, former moderator of Bugtraq
- Aleph-1 (album), a 2007 album by Alva Noto
- Aleph-1 may also refer to a Threnodian character in the game Wuthering Waves
