= -al =

Suffix used in organic chemistry

In chemistry, the suffix -al is the IUPAC nomenclature used in organic chemistry to form names of aldehydes containing the -(CO)H group in the systematic form. It was extracted from the word "aldehyde". With the exception of chemical compounds having a higher priority than it, all aldehydes are named using -al, such as 'propanal'. Some aldehydes also have common names, such as formaldehyde for methanal, acetaldehyde for ethanal. Benzaldehyde does not have a systematic form with -al.
