= A1 (classification) =

Amputee sports classification

A1 is an amputee sport classification used by the International Sports Organization for the Disabled (ISOD) for people with acquired or congenital amputations. This class is for sportspeople who have both legs amputated above the knee. Their amputations impact their sport performance, including having balance issues, increased energy costs, higher rates of oxygen consumption, and issues with their gait. Sports people in this class are eligible to participate in include athletics, swimming, sitting volleyball, archery, weightlifting, badminton, lawn bowls, sitzball and wheelchair basketball.

== Definition ==
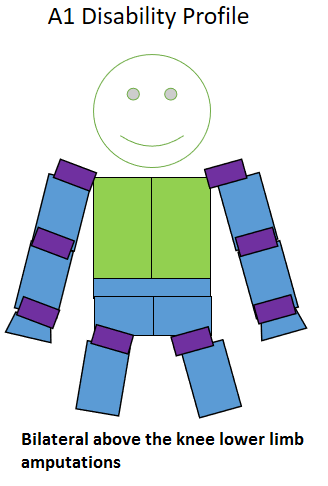
Type of amputation for an A1 classified sportsperson.

This class is for people who have both legs amputated above the knee. This classification is sometimes abbreviated as A/K. In competing in other sports, this class may have a different name:

Class	Abbr	Athletics	Cycling	Skiing	Swimming	Comparable classifications in other sports	Ref
A1	A/K	T54, F56, F57, F58	LC4	LW1, LW12.2	S4, S5, S6	Badminton: W3. Lawn bowls: LB1. Sitting volleyball: Open. Sitzball: Open. Ten-pin bowling: TPB8. Wheelchair basketball: 3 point player, 3.5 point player Wheelchair fencing: 3	

== Performance and physiology ==
The nature of a person's amputations in this class can effect their physiology and sports performance. Lower limb amputations effect a person's energy cost for being mobile. To keep their oxygen consumption rate similar to people without lower limb amputations, they need to walk slower. People in this class use around 120% more oxygen to walk or run the same distance as someone without a lower limb amputation.

People in this class can have a number of problems with their gait. There are a number of different causes for these issues, and suggested ways to modify them. For a gait that involves the knee buckling, there are a number of causes including the heel being too firm, excessive heel leverage, incorrect alignment of the prosthetic knee or weak hip extensions. All but the last can be fixed by making adjustments to the prosthetic. The last is fixed by doing more gait training. If the prosthetic foot is rotating at heel strike, the cause is likely a poor socket fit or rotation. This is fixed by adjusting the socket.

Prosthetic fitting and functionality in this class can differ depending on where, between the knee and hip, the amputation exists. The lower the amputation, the greater the lever the prosthetic user has using prosthesis and the more control they have in its usage. The higher the amputation, the less control they have. This can result in problems with balance.

Because of the potential for balance issues related to having an amputation, during weight training, amputees are encouraged to use a spotter when lifting more than 15 pounds (6.8 kg).

== Governance ==
This classification was set up by ISOD, with the current version adopted in 1992 and then modified in 1993. IWAS was created following the merger of ISOD and International Stoke Mandeville Games Federation (ISMGF) in 2005. Subsequently, IWAS became the classification governing body for some amputee sports. In a few cases for wheelchair events run by IWAS, CP-ISRA parallel classes may be used to allow wheelchair using amputees to compete in these events. In the case of A2, this means that CP3 sportspeople from CP-ISRA may be in their class.

== Sports ==
People in this class are more likely to participate in wheelchair sports than other amputee classes.

=== Athletics ===
For athletics competitions that use the IPC athletics classification system, this class competes in T54, F56, F57 and F58.

People in this class use a prosthetic limb when competing in athletics. It has four parts: a socket, a knee, a shank and a foot. Above the knee amputees have difficulty using standard able-bodied sprint actions because of the differences in their functional muscle mass. As a result, they often use a specialized sprinting technique called “Leg-Over-Leg”. This technique involves using hip extensions to avoid deceleration caused by the prosthetic leg hitting the ground. Use of a specially made carbon fibre running prosthetic leg assists runners in this class in lowering their heart rate compared to using a prosthetic not designed for running. Runners in this class can have lower metabolic costs compared to elite runners over middle and long distances. In shot put, people in this class often plant their left leg against the toe board when they begin the glide stage of their throw. Double amputees have difficulty using a starting block in track events because they cannot align their legs with the block in the standard way. They often use different starting positions as a result.

A study comparing the performance of athletics competitors at the 1984 Summer Paralympics found there was no significant difference in performance in times between women in A1, A2 and A3 in the discus, women in A1 and A2 in the javelin, women in A1 and A2 in the 100 meter race, men in A1, A2 and A3 in the discus, men in A1, A2, A3, A4, A5, A6, A7, A8 and A9 in the javelin, men in A1, A2 and A3 in the shot put, men in A1 and A2 in the 100 meter race, and men in A1, A2, A3 and A4 in the 400 meter race. Double below the knee amputees also have a competitive advantage when compared to double above the knee amputees. From the 2004 Summer Paralympics to the 2012 Summer Paralympics, there was no significant changes in performance times put up by male sprinters in 100 meter, 200 meter and 400 meter events.

In general, track athletes with amputations should be considerate of the surface they are running on, and avoid asphalt and cinder tracks.

=== Basketball ===
The wheelchair basketball classification system used by the IWBF is open to people from this class. Those with hip articulations are generally classified as 3 point players, while those with slightly longer leg stumps in this class are 3.5 point players. Despite wheelchair basketball having been around since the first Paralympic Games, amputee players from this class were first allowed to be classified and participate internationally in 1983 following the creation of a functional classification system in Cologne, Germany by Horst Strokhkendl. Players from this class first competed at the 1983 Gold Cup Championships. In the United States under the old classification system used by the NWBA, members of this class who had hip articulations would compete in class 2.

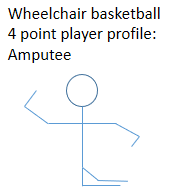
Potential amputation profile of a person in this class and their related wheelchair basketball classification

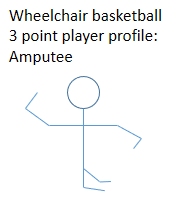
Potential amputation profile of a person in this class and their related wheelchair basketball classification

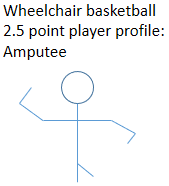
Potential amputation profile of a person in this class and their related wheelchair basketball classification

=== Cycling ===
People in this class tend to be classified in cycling events as LC4. The class is for cyclists with an impairment in both legs.

=== Skiing ===
People in this class tend to be classified as LW skiers. The International Paralympic Committee defined that class as "Competitors with severe disabilities in both lower limbs ... The typical disability profile of the class is double above-knee amputation." While skiing, they may use a prosthesis. In the Biathlon, skiers in this class can use a rifle support while shooting.

=== Swimming ===
People with amputations are eligible to compete in swimming at the Paralympic Games. A1 swimmers may be found in several classes. These include S4, S5 and S6. Swimmers in this class have a similar stroke length and stroke rate comparable to able bodied swimmers. Prior to the 1990s, this class was often grouped with other amputee classes in swimming competitions, including the Paralympic Games.

=== Other sports ===
Other sports people in this class are eligible to compete in include sitting volleyball, archery, and weightlifting. In both archery and sitting volleyball, different classes of amputees have historically competed against each other as one class for people with amputations or people who have a minimal disability level. In the case of weightlifting, amputees have also traditionally been grouped together, with divisions being based on weight instead. In powerlifting, only A1 and A3 are eligible as classes but they are categorized by weight, not classification type. They can also participate in badminton. When playing in a wheelchair, they compete as W3. Another sport open to people in this class is lawn bowls. A1 competitors can be classified as LB1. This is a sitting class. Ten pin bowling is also open to people in this class. They compete in the TPB8 class. In wheelchair fencing, they are often classified as 3s, assuming they have enough stumps to assist in maintaining their balance.

Sitzball, the precursor to sitting volleyball, is another option. It is open to A1 to A9 classified players along with anyone who might be classified as "les autres" or who have lesser amputations that would not qualify them for ISOD classification. It is not open to people with spinal cord injuries. Play is open, with no requirements as to which types of disabilities are on the court at any time.

Rowing is another sport open to people with amputations. In 1991, the first internationally accepted adaptive rowing classification system was established and put into use. People from this class were initially classified as A2 for people with double amputations.

== Becoming classified ==
Classification is often based on the anatomical nature of the amputation. The classification system takes several things into account when putting people into this class. These include which limbs are effected, how many limbs are effected, and how much of a limb is missing.

For this class, classification generally has four phases. The first stage of classification is a health examination. For amputees, this is often done on site at a sports training facility or competition. The second stage is observation in practice, the third stage is observation in competition and the last stage is assigning the sportsperson to a relevant class. Sometimes the health examination may not be done on site because the nature of the amputation could cause not physically visible alterations to the body. This is especially true for lower limb amputees as it relates to how their limbs align with their hips and the impact this has on their spine and how their skull sits on their spine.

For wheelchair basketball, part of the classification process involves observing a player during practice or training. This often includes observing them go one on one against someone who is likely to be in the same class the player would be classified into.
