= Shrimp marketing =

Marketing of shrimp as food

Shrimp are marketed and commercialised with several issues in mind. Most shrimp are sold frozen and marketed based on their categorisation of presentation, grading, colour, and uniformity.

== Presentation ==
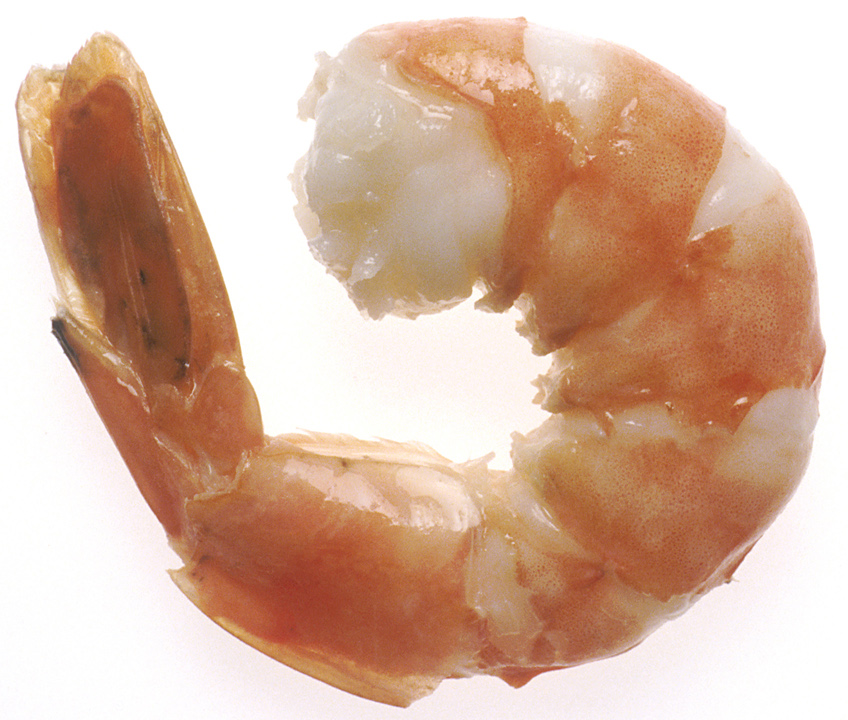
A steamed tail-on shrimp

The main forms of presentation are head-on shell on (HOSO), shell-on (SO or "green headless shrimp"), peeled tail on (PTO), peeled undeveined (PUD), peeled and deveined (P&D), peeled deveined and tail on deveined (PDTO) and butterfly tail on (BTTY-TO). Sometimes a letter 'F' is placed in front of these abbreviations for the presentation in order to state that the shrimp comes from a farm (example: FSO – farmed, shell on). European and Asian markets prefer the HOSO presentation (which is a whole shrimp), while the American shrimp market prefers the remaining presentations.

== Grading ==
Shrimp are graded according to their count per weight. HOSO shrimps are graded in units per kilogram (30/40, 40/50, 50/60, etc. pcs/kg). The standard pack is in a 2 kg box, 10 boxes into a master carton. The remaining presentations are graded in units per pound (U15, 16/20, 21/25, 26/30, 31/35, 36/40, 41/50, etc. pcs/lb). The standard pack is in a 5 lb box, 10 boxes into a master carton.

The numbers in the grading code indicate maximum and minimum quantity of pieces per unit weight, with U standing for "under".

== Color ==
HOSO shrimp are also graded according to their colour, with A1 being the lightest colour and A5 the darkest colour. Shrimp tend to take on the colour of their habitat, so sandy ponds tend to yield an A1 colour shrimp, and shrimp ponds with plastic black liners tend to yield A5 colour shrimp. A2–A3 colour shrimp are preferred for fresh commercialisation, and A4–A5 colour shrimp are preferred for cooked commercialisation. The other presentations are not usually graded by colour.

== Uniformity ==
Another concept to grade is the uniformity. This is measured by visually selecting the ten largest and the ten smallest pieces from 1 kg of product. The two groups are then weighed separately and the weight of the large pieces group is divided by the weight of the small pieces group. The result is the uniformity factor. Normally the maximum accepted value for the uniformity factor is 1.5.

== See also ==
- List of harvested aquatic animals by weight
