= A-1 (code) =

A-1 was the designation for a code used by the United States Navy during World War I that replaced the Secret Code of 1887, SIGCODE and another system designed for radio communication. The cryptographic system was developed by Lt. W.W. Smith in the Office of Naval Operations by randomly associating key words with 5 letter patterns.
