= Alter A.1 =

A.I

General information
- Type: Scout
- National origin: Germany
- Manufacturer: Alter
- Designer: Kallweit and Ketterer
- Number built: 1

History
- First flight: February 1917

The Alter A.1 was a single-seat biplane fighter aircraft first flown in February 1917. Built by Ludwig Alter-Werke of Darmstadt to a design by Kallweit and Ketterer, the A.1 was very similar in concept to the Nieuport 11, but not an exact copy.

== Design and development ==
Powered by a 110 hp Goebel Goe II 7-cylinder rotary engine, the A.1 had I-type inter-plane struts and a wood-framed, fabric and plywood covered fuselage, armed with twin, synchronised 7.92 mm LMG 08/15 machine guns.

Development was halted following demonstration to the Idflieg (Inspektion der Fliegertruppe), who judged its performance inadequate and its construction overly flimsy.

== Specifications (Alter A.I) ==
Data from Alter A.Ifr:Alter A.I

General characteristics

- Crew: 1
- Gross weight: 510 kg (1,124 lb)
- Powerplant: × Goebel Goe II 7-cylinder air-cooled rotary piston engine, 82 kW (110 hp)

Performance

- Maximum speed: 117 km/h (73 mph, 63 kn)
- Rate of climb: 3.91 m/s (770 ft/min)
- Time to altitude: 3,000m in 12.8min

Armament

== See also ==
Aircraft of comparable role, configuration, and era

- Nieuport 11
