= AAL =

AAL or Aal may refer to:

== Arts and entertainment ==
- Aal (film), a 2014 Tamil thriller
- Against All Logic, pseudonym of musician Nicolas Jaar (born 1990)
- Animals as Leaders, a progressive metal band (formed 2007)
- Arjen Anthony Lucassen (born 1960), Dutch musician
- Johannes Aal (c. 1500 – 1553), Swiss Roman Catholic composer and dramaturg

== Businesses and organizations ==
=== Businesses ===
- Aid Association for Lutherans, one of the companies that formed Thrivent Financial for Lutherans in 2002
- American Airlines, ICAO airline designator AAL
- American Airlines Group, parent company of American Airlines (NASDAQ symbol AAL)
- Anglo American plc, a British multinational mining corporation (London Stock Exchange symbol AAL)
- Adelaide Airport Limited, owners of the Adelaide Airport

=== Political ===
- Aborigines Advancement League, an Aboriginal organisation in Melbourne
- Aborigines' Advancement League of South Australia, usually AALSA but often referred to as AAL within the state
- Australian Aborigines' League, a precursor to the Victorian Aborigines Advancement League (now Aborigines Advancement League; see above)

=== Other businesses and organizations ===
- Ambient Assisted Living programme, of the European Commission
- American Arena League, an indoor football league
- Australian Academy of Law
- Australian Air League, Australian Air Cadet Organisation

== Places ==
- Aal (Kocher), a river in Aalen, Germany
- Ål, Buskerud, Norway
- Aalborg Airport in North Jutland Region, Denmark, IATA airport code AAL

== Science, technology and mathematics ==
- Abstract algebraic logic, in mathematics
- Anterior Axillary Line, vertical line along the anterior axillary (underarm) fold
- ATM Adaptation Layers, to compute information transfer
- Authenticator § NIST authenticator assurance levels
- Automated Anatomical Labeling, a digital atlas of the human brain

== Other uses ==
- Aal, a reddish dye from the roots of the East Indian mulberry shrubs Morinda citrifolia and Morinda tinctoria
- Above aerodrome level, an altitude relative to the nearest aerodrome
- Afade language, spoken in Cameroon and Nigeria (ISO 639-3:aal)
- Attorney at law
