= A-1 Yola =

A-1 Yola may refer to:

- A-1 Yola (11/5 album)
- A-1 Yola (Esham album)
