= A1 (shipping) =

Symbol used to denote quality

In shipping, the designation A1 is a symbol used to denote quality of construction and material. In the various shipping registers ships are classed and given a rating after an official examination, and assigned a classification mark, which appears in addition to other particulars in those shipping registers after the name of the ship. In Lloyd's Register the letter represents the quality of the hull, the number the quality of the fitting out.

== See also ==
- Shipbuilding
- A1 at Lloyd's, the top classification in Lloyd's Register
